= Sommerfeldt (Norwegian family) =

Sommerfeldt or Sommerfelt is a Norwegian family.

The name, meaning "Summerfield", can be traced back to Finnmark in the sixteenth century. The oldest ancestor of the current family line was Jørgen Sommerfeldt (1544–1618), burgomaster of Århus in Denmark. After a few of the later generations were based in Toten, Norway, part of the family returned to Denmark, dividing it into a Danish and Norwegian branch.

== Family tree ==
David (1717–1773)
Ole G. (1785–1858) | Christian (1746–1811) | Ole Hannibal (1753–1821) | Maria (1754–1823)
Alette G. (1833–1891) | Halfdan (1830–1901) | Søren Christian (1794–1838) | Sophie (1800–1848) | Olaus S. (1784–1851) | Fredrik (1785–1856) | Hans (1783–1822) | Olava (1790–1867) | Joachim W. (1793–1829) | Lauritz W. (1775–1856)
Adam H. (1816–1871) | Sofie (1824–1898) | Christian (1819–1903) | Gustav Adolf (1836–1910) | Karl (1834–1908) | Harald Wilhelm (1819–1863) | Hakon (1811–1888) | Hans Sverre (1820–1907) | Thora W. (1826–1883) | Frederik S. W. (1803–1875)
son (–) | Jørgine H. (1852–) | Søren Kristian (1851–1934) | Søren Christian (1877–1965) | Harald Vilhelm (1848–1920) | Axel (1860–1938) | Hakon (1843–1915) | Einar (1855–) | Thorolf (1849–1909) | Sophus W. (1836–1894)
(–) | Søren Christian (1916–2003) | Aimée (1892–1975) | Alf (1892–1965) | Wilhelm (1881–1957) | Haakon (1874–) | Thormod (1883–1959) | Harald (1886–1966)
Christian (1916–) | Øistein (1919–1994) | Axel (1926–)
