= Søren Christian Sommerfelt =

Søren Christian Sommerfelt may refer to:

- Søren Christian Sommerfelt (botanist) (1794–1838), Norwegian priest and botanist
- Søren Christian Sommerfelt (diplomat) (1916–2003), Norwegian diplomat

== See also ==
- Søren Kristian Sommerfelt (1851–1934), Norwegian priest
