= MGP Nordic 2008 =

Song competition

Date and venue
- Final: 29 November 2008
- Venue: Musikhuset Store Sal; Aarhus, Denmark

Organisation
- Broadcaster: Danmarks Radio (DR)
- Presenters: Jakob Riising; Signe Lindkvist

Participants
- Number of entries: 8 entries, 2 from each Scandinavian country

Vote
- Voting system: Points are given depending on the percentage of the vote received by each country e.g. 21% equals 21 points
- Winning song: Norway "Oro jaska beana"

Melodi Grand Prix Nordic 2008 was the fourth Nordic Melodi Grand Prix, a Scandinavian song contest for children aged 8 to 15. The contest was held on November 29, 2008 in Aarhus, Denmark and the participating countries were Norway, Sweden, Denmark and Finland. Each country submitted two songs to participate in the first round with the top placing entry from each country proceeding to the super-final. The winner of the MGP Nordic 2008 was Norway's The BlackSheeps with "Oro jaska beana".

== Format ==
Each country partakes in a national selection for MGP Nordic. The top two songs from each country proceed to MGP Nordic. Eight songs participate in the contest to make it more substantial. All eight songs in the Final are performed. After the eight songs have been performed the Scandinavian countries vote for their favourite. After the voting has closed, the top song from each participating country is announced. The top four songs then sing again in the Super Final. The Scandinavian countries then vote again for their favourites. The winner is announced after the second round of voting has taken place. The voting system is different from the Eurovision and the Junior Eurovision Song Contest. It is also different from the Eurovision Dance Contest, making it unique in European contests. The percentage of votes given by a country is translated directly into points, e.g. 21% equals 21 points. No country can get nil points as each country gives points to every country. A country cannot vote for themselves, like in the Eurovision contests. The winning contestant then sings again as the credits roll.

== National selections ==
- Norway decided: 5 September 2008
- Denmark decided: 20 September 2008
- Sweden decided: 4 October 2008
- Finland decided: 31 October 2008

== Participating countries ==
Participants of MGP Nordic 2008
Country	Broadcaster	Artist	Song	Language	Songwriter(s)
Denmark	DR	The Johanssons	"En for alle, alle for en"	Danish (Note: "Hola chica" contains a repeated phrase in Spanish.)	Marcus Johansson; Mattias Johansson
Denmark	DR	Sandra Monique	"Hola chica"	Danish	Sandra Monique
Finland	Yle Fem	Footboys	"Fotboll"	Swedish	Anton Wikström; Ivar Arvidsson
Finland	Yle Fem	Big Bang!	"Här är vi"	Swedish	Edward Isaksson; Emma Rehn; Märta Westerlund; Mathias Broman; Rafael Berglund; Robin Granqvist
Norway	NRK	The Battery	"Tenke nå"	Norwegian	Brage Kristian Einum Jr.; Hans Olav Settem; Oddbjørn Sponås; Stein Boge
Norway	NRK	The BlackSheeps	"Oro jaska beana"	Norwegian, Sami	Agnete Johnsen; Alexander Tourygun; Emelie Nilsen; Viktoria Eriksen
Sweden	SVT	Linn	"En sång från hjärtat"	Swedish	Linn Eriksson
Sweden	SVT	Jonna	"Kommer jag våga"	Swedish	Jonna Torstensson

=== Denmark ===
- The Johanssons consist of brothers Mattias and Marcus. Their song "En for alle, alle for en", which means One for all, all for one, is a pop-rock song about the need to care for each other.
- Sandra Monique's song "Hola chica" which means "Hey Girl", is about friendship at a distance. Sandra, aged 12 at the time, is a big fan of Lil Mama and Chris Brown. In her spare time she practices gymnastics, singing and dancing. In the future she hopes to become a singer or a photographer.

=== Finland ===
- Footboys is a singing duo from Finland, consisting of friends Anton and Ivar. Like the duo's name suggests, the members are very interested in football and the song "Fotboll" is about their love for said sport.
- No fewer than six band members are in the group Big Bang. The six friends competed with a contribution entitled "Här är vi", which means "Here We Are" and the song is about their love for music. The band's name is not to be confused with the South Korean boy band of the same name.

=== Norway ===
- "Oro jaska beana" is the song sung by The BlackSheeps. The song title roughly means Be quiet/shut up dog and is about a dog that is fat and unhealthy and eventually dies from high blood pressure. The group consists of three girls and a boy, between the ages of 14 and 15 at the time of the contest. Lead singer Agnete Johnsen later represented Norway in the Eurovision Song Contest 2016 with the song "Icebreaker".
- All four members of The Battery were born in 1994. The boys have performed together since December 2006 and have written over 10 songs as a band. One of them is the song "Tenke nå", which means "Think Now", and deals with climate issues. The song invites us to reflect on what actually is happening to the environment and nature and that it is time to do something about global warming. In October 2008, the band gained a new member to play the bass guitar.

=== Sweden ===
- Linn, aged 15 at the time, was raised in Falun and plays both violin and piano. She usually writes her songs on the piano. In her spare time she watches films and listens to Evanescence.
- When fourteen-year-old Jonna from Färgelanda listens to music, it is often Avril Lavigne songs. Jonna describes herself as a positive girl who likes to be with her friends and also likes to sing. A rare talent she has is that she can "tremble" with her eyes.

== Results ==
Each of the Scandinavian countries were represented by two artists.

=== First round ===
The artist with the most votes from each country proceeded to the Super Final. The qualifiers were the Johanssons from Denmark, Footboys from Finland, The BlackSheeps from Norway, and Jonna from Sweden.

_{Running order from YLE}

Draw	Country	Artist	Song	Result
1	Denmark	The Johanssons	"En for alle, alle for en"	Super-final
2	Norway	The Battery	"Tenke nå"	Out
3	Sweden	Linn	"En sång från hjärtat"	Out
4	Finland	Footboys	"Fotboll"	Super-final
5	Denmark	Sandra Monique	"Hola chica"	Out
6	Norway	The BlackSheeps	"Oro jaska beana	Super-final
7	Sweden	Jonna	"Kommer jag våga"	Super-final
8	Finland	Big Bang!	"Här är vi"	Out

=== Super-final ===
Each super finalist sang their songs again for the Scandinavian public. The viewers then voted for the second time whilst the second interval act took place. This included the participants singing a medley containing excerpts from songs about music. The results were announced by puppets for each country. Each song gained points depending on the percentage of votes they won from each country. Norway won by a landslide with 74 points more than second-placed host country Denmark.

Draw	Country	Artist	Song	Points	Place
1	Denmark	The Johanssons	"En for alle, alle for en"	90	2
2	Finland	Footboys	"Fotboll"	70	4
3	Norway	The BlackSheeps	"Oro jaska beana"	164	1
4	Sweden	Jonna	"Kommer jag våga"	76	3

== Scoreboard ==
=== Voting ===
		Televoting Results				
		Total Score	Denmark	Finland	Norway	Sweden
Contestants	(Denmark) The Johanssons	90		19	52	19
Contestants	(Finland) Footboys	70	17		23	30
Contestants	(Norway) The BlackSheeps	164	53	60		51
Contestants	(Sweden) Jonna	76	30	21	25	
