= Freddy Kalas =

Norwegian singer

- Also known as: Freddy Kalas; Freddy Genius
- Born: Fredrik Auke; 12 February 1990 (age 36); Drammen, Norway
- Genres: Eurodance; electro house; EDM; progressive house; pop; dance-pop; reggae fusion
- Occupation: Singer
- Instrument: Vocal
- Years active: 2009–present
- Labels: Alter Ego Music; Universal Music Norway
- Website: freddykalas.no

Fredrik Auke (born 12 February 1990), also known as Freddy Kalas and previously as Freddy Genius, is a Norwegian singer signed to Alter Ego Music. His debut hit "Pinne for landet" topped VG lista, the official Norwegian Singles Chart. The follow-up "Hey Ho" made it to number 2 on the same chart. He is the brother of Simen Auke from the DJ duo Broiler.

In 2016, he took part in the preselection for Norwegian Melodi Grand Prix in a bid to represent Norway in Eurovision Song Contest 2016 with "Feel Da Rush". He reached the final four in the preselection process finishing runner-up to the winning song "Icebreaker" by Agnete. Kalas' song proved popular with the public making it to number 2 on the Norwegian Singles Chart.

== Discography ==
=== Singles ===
As main artist

Song	Year	Peak positions	
Song	Year	NOR	SWE
Credited as Freddy Kalas
"Pinne for landet"	2014	1	78
"Fest hos Kalas"	2015	26	—
"Reidar"	2015	—	—
"Hey Ho"	2015	2	4
"God sommer"	2015	23	—
"Pinne for Sverige"	2015	—	59
"Feel Da Rush"	2016	2	72
"Jovial"	2016	1	79
"Sunshine Hits My Face"	2016	31	—
"Gjøre ingenting"	2017	15	—
"Vibber"	2017	—	—
"Blime!"	2018	14	—
"Et sommertegn"	2021	32	—
"Bare en mann"	2022	16	—
"Dans"	2023	25	—
"Olav Olav"	2023	32	—
"Hallo" (with Timbuktu)	2023	39	—
"—" denotes a recording that did not chart or was not released in that territory.

As featuring artist

Song	Year	Peak positions	
Song	Year	NOR	SWE
Credited as Freddy Genius
"Cannabus 2011" (SimenA featuring Freddy Genius)	2011	2	—
"Perfect Strangers" (Mikkel Christiansen featuring Freddy Genius)	2011	—	—
"Bongo Drum" (Robin og Bugge featuring Freddy Genius)	2013	—	—
"Gaiastova" (Henrik Sæter and Ole Pedersen featuring Freddy Genius)	2014	—	—
"—" denotes a recording that did not chart or was not released in that territory.

== Awards and nominations ==
Year	Organization	Award	Work	Result
2017	Spellemannprisen	Årets Låt (Song of the Year)	"Jovial"	Nominated
