= Agnete Saba =

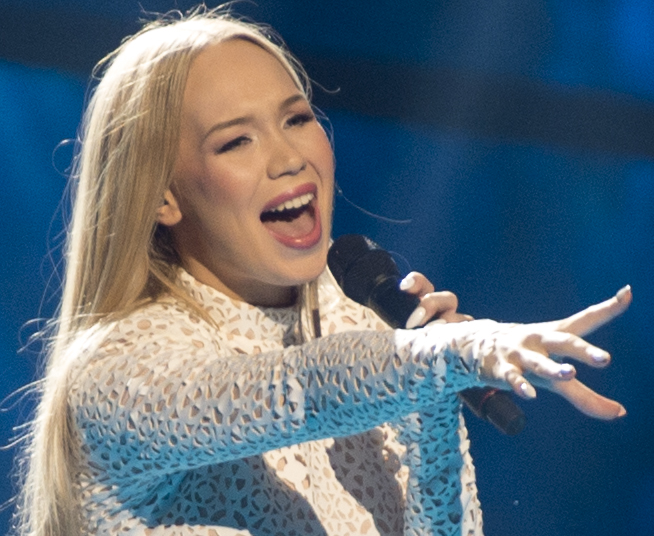
- Agnete in 2016

Background information
- Also known as: Agnete; Agnete Saba
- Born: Agnete Kristin Johnsen; 4 July 1994 (age 32); Nesseby, Norway
- Genres: Pop; electropop
- Occupations: Singer; songwriter
- Instrument: Vocals
- Years active: 2008–present
- Member of: The BlackSheeps

Agnete Kristin Johnsen Saba (born 4 July 1994), also known as Agnete Saba, Agnete Johnsen or simply Agnete, is a Sami-Norwegian singer and songwriter. Saba is best known for being the lead singer of the Norwegian teen punk band the BlackSheeps. She represented Norway in the Eurovision Song Contest 2016 as a solo artist with the song "Icebreaker".

== Life and career ==
=== Early life and career ===
Saba was born as Agnete Kristin Johnsen on 4 July 1994 in Varangerbotn in Nesseby Municipality in Finnmark county, Norway. She is an ethnic Sami and the daughter of Sami children's author Signe Iversen. In 2020, she changed her surname to include her grandmother's maiden name Saba.

The BlackSheeps were formed in 2008 while its members were attending school in their hometown of Nesseby. They later won Melodi Grand Prix Junior 2008 with their song "Oro jaska, beana" ("Be quiet, dog") which was performed in both Norwegian and Northern Sami. The band later performed at MGP Nordic 2008 and won the competition. "Oro jaska, beana" went on to win Song of the Year at the Spellemannprisen Awards and peaked at number-one on the Norwegian singles chart.

In 2011, the band were announced as one of the competing acts in Melodi Grand Prix 2011 with the song "Dance Tonight", where they placed second. They later split up the same year.

In 2013, Agnete competed in the second season of the Norwegian music TV-competition Stjernekamp, where she placed second in the finale against Silya Nymoen. The same year she also performed as an interval act during Melodi Grand Prix Junior 2013.

=== 2014–present: Skal vi danse? ===
In 2014, Johnsen was announced as one of the competing celebrities in the tenth season of the Norwegian version of Dancing with the Stars, called Skal vi danse? (Shall we dance?). She went on to win the competition. In 2015, she participated in the Norwegian reality television series 71° nord, but withdrew early in the season because of mental health problems.

=== Eurovision Song Contest 2016 ===
On 19 January 2016, Johnsen was announced as one of the ten competing acts in Melodi Grand Prix 2016 with the song "Icebreaker". In the final, held on 27 February, she was declared the winner after receiving 166,728 votes from the Norwegian public. She represented Norway in the Eurovision Song Contest 2016 performing on 12 May 2016, during the second semi-final held in Stockholm, but failed to qualify to the 14 May final.

== Discography ==
=== Extended plays ===
Title	Details
Tundra	Released: 26 March 2021; Label: Aiko; Format: Digital download

=== Singles ===
==== As lead artist ====
Title	Year	Peak chart positions	Certifications	Album
Title	Year	NOR	Certifications	Album
"Goin' Insane"	2013	—		Nature
"Mama"	2014	—		Nature
"Icebreaker"	2016	11	IFPI NOR: Gold	Nature
"Beginning of the End"	2020	—		Tundra
"Boo"	2021	—		Tundra
"Solid"	2021	—		Tundra
"Barely Breathing" (with Jowst featuring Azzip)	2021	—		Non-album single
"—" denotes a recording that did not chart or was not released

==== As featured artist ====
Title	Year	Album
"Hurricane Lover" (Carina Dahl featuring Agnete)	2015	Non-single album

Awards and achievements
Preceded by Mørland & Debrah Scarlett with "A Monster Like Me"	Norway in the Eurovision Song Contest; 2016	Succeeded by JOWST (with Aleksander Walmann) with "Grab the Moment"
