= Norway in the Eurovision Song Contest 2016 =

- Eurovision Song Contest 2016
- Participating broadcaster: Norsk rikskringkasting (NRK)
- Country: Norway
- Selection process: Melodi Grand Prix 2016
- Selection date: 27 February 2016

Competing entry
- Song: "Icebreaker"
- Artist: Agnete
- Songwriters: Agnete Johnsen; Gabriel Alares; Ian Curnow

Placement
- Semi-final result: Failed to qualify (13th)

Participation chronology

Norway was represented at the Eurovision Song Contest 2016 with the song "Icebreaker" written by Agnete Johnsen, Gabriel Alares and Ian Curnow. The song was performed by Agnete. The Norwegian broadcaster Norsk rikskringkasting (NRK) organised the national final Melodi Grand Prix 2016 in order to select the Norwegian entry for the 2016 contest in Stockholm, Sweden. Ten entries competed in a show that took place on 27 February 2016 and the winner was determined over two rounds of public televoting. The top four entries in the first round of voting advanced to the competition's second round—the Gold Final. In the second round of public televoting, "Icebreaker" performed by Agnete was selected as the winner with 166,728 votes.

Norway was drawn to compete in the second semi-final of the Eurovision Song Contest which took place on 12 May 2016. Performing during the show in position 15, "Icebreaker" was not announced among the top 10 entries of the second semi-final and therefore did not qualify to compete in the final. It was later revealed that Norway placed thirteenth out of the 18 participating countries in the semi-final with 63 points.

== Background ==
Prior to the 2016 contest, Norway had participated in the Eurovision Song Contest 54 times since its first entry in 1960. Norway had won the contest on three occasions: in 1985 with the song "La det swinge" performed by Bobbysocks!, in 1995 with the song "Nocturne" performed by Secret Garden, and in 2009 with the song "Fairytale" performed by Alexander Rybak. Norway also had the two dubious distinctions of having finished last in the Eurovision final more than any other country and for having the most "nul points" (zero points) in the contest, the latter being a record the nation shared together with Austria. The country had finished last eleven times and had failed to score a point during four contests. Following the introduction of semi-finals for the 2004, Norway has finished in the top ten six times, including their 2015 entry "A Monster Like Me" performed by Mørland and Debrah Scarlett.

The Norwegian national broadcaster, Norsk rikskringkasting (NRK), broadcasts the event within Norway and organises the selection process for the nation's entry. NRK confirmed their intentions to participate at the 2016 Eurovision Song Contest on 27 May 2015. The broadcaster has traditionally organised the national final Melodi Grand Prix, which has selected the Norwegian entry for the Eurovision Song Contest in all but one of their participation. On 22 June 2015, the broadcaster revealed details regarding their selection procedure and announced the organization of Melodi Grand Prix 2016 in order to select the 2016 Norwegian entry.

== Before Eurovision ==
=== Melodi Grand Prix 2016 ===
Melodi Grand Prix 2016 was the 54th edition of the Norwegian national final Melodi Grand Prix and selected Norway's entry for the Eurovision Song Contest 2016. The show took place on 27 February 2016 at the Oslo Spektrum in Oslo, hosted by Silya Nymoen and Kåre Magnus Bergh. Jan Fredrik Karlsen was assigned as the new music producer for the competition, replacing Vivi Stenberg who held the position since 2013. The show was televised on NRK1, broadcast via radio with commentary by Hanne Hoftun on NRK P1 as well as streamed online at NRK's official website nrk.no and the official Eurovision Song Contest website eurovision.tv. The national final was watched by 1.313 million viewers in Norway with a market share of 71.1%, making it the most watched Melodi Grand Prix final since 2010.

==== Competing entries ====
A submission period was opened by NRK between 22 June 2015 and 11 September 2015. Songwriters of any nationality were allowed to submit entries, while performers of the selected songs would be chosen by NRK in consultation with the songwriters. In addition to the public call for submissions, NRK reserved the right to directly invite certain artists and composers to compete. At the close of the deadline, approximately 1,000 submissions were received. Ten songs were selected for the competition by a jury panel consisting of Jan Fredrik Karlsen (Melodi Grand Prix music producer), Marie Komissar (NRK P3 radio host and music producer), Pia Skevik (NRK P1 radio host and producer) and Stig Karlsen (NRK producer and Melodi Grand Prix project manager). The competing acts and songs were revealed on 19 January 2016 during a press conference at NRK studios, presented by Kåre Magnus Bergh, Silya Nymoen and Jan Fredrik Karlsen and broadcast via NRK1 and online at mgp.no. 15-second clips of the competing entries were released during the press conference, while the songs in their entirety were premiered on 2 February.

On 21 January 2016, NRK held a meeting with Freddy Kalas to discuss accusations of self-plagiarism in regards to his entry, "Happy Rush", written by Fredrik Auke (Freddy Kalas), Simen Auke, Mikkel Christiansen, Trond Opsahl and Christoffer Huse. "Happy Rush" was compared to a song the performer had released in 2011 under a different artistic name and in collaboration with the same authors: "Cannabus" by SimenA featuring Freddy Genius. On 22 January, NRK confirmed that the chorus of the song was re-written and that the song received a new title: "Feel Da Rush".

==== Final ====
Ten songs competed during the final on 27 February 2016. The winner was selected over two rounds of public televoting. In the first round, the top four entries were selected to proceed to the second round, the Gold Final. In the Gold Final, the results of the public televote were revealed by Norway's five regions and led to the victory of "Icebreaker" performed by Agnete with 166,728 votes. In addition to the performances of the competing entries, the interval acts featured performances of several past Norwegian Eurovision entries: Kate Gulbrandsen performed the 1987 entry "Mitt liv", Mørland and Debrah Scarlett performed the 2015 entry "A Monster Like Me", host Silya Nymoen covered Nora Brockstedt's 1960 entry "Voi Voi" and Åse Kleveland performed the 1966 entry "Intet er nytt under solen". Also, 2004 Norwegian entrant Knut Anders Sørum and Reidun Sæther covered Jahn Teigen and Anita Skorgan's 1982 Eurovision entry "Adieu", Teigen's 1978 Eurovision entry "Mil etter mil" and Teigen's 1989 Melodi Grand Prix entry "Optimist", while Teigen himself performed his 1976 Melodi Grand Prix entry "Voodoo".

Final – 27 February 2016
R/O	Artist	Song	Songwriter(s)	Result
1	The Hungry Hearts feat. Lisa Dillan	"Laika"	Tonje Gjevjon	—N/a
2	Stage Dolls	"Into the Fire"	Torstein Flakne, Anne Judith Wik, Mark Spiro, Hallgeir Rustan	—N/a
3	Stine Hole Ulla	"Traces"	Stine Hole Ulla, Ingrid Skretting, Trude Kristin Klæboe	—N/a
4	Makeda	"Stand Up"	Danne Attlerud, Michael Clauss, Thomas Thörnholm	—N/a
5	Pegasus	"Anyway"	Tommy Nilsen, Ronny Nilsen	—N/a
6	Freddy Kalas	"Feel Da Rush"	Fredrik Auke, Simen Auke, Mikkel Christiansen, Trond Opsahl, Christoffer Huse	Advanced
7	Laila Samuels	"Afterglow"	Laila Samuelsen, The Beatgees, Jan Weigel	Advanced
8	Elouiz	"History"	André Lindahl, Jeanette Olsson, Michael Jay	—N/a
9	Suite 16	"Anna Lee"	David Bjoerk, Andreas Moe, David Eriksen, Alexander Austheim	Advanced
10	Agnete	"Icebreaker"	Agnete Johnsen, Gabriel Alares, Ian Curnow	Advanced

Gold Final – 27 February 2016
R/O	Artist	Song	Eastern Norway	Northern Norway	Central Norway	Southern Norway	Western Norway	Total	Place
1	Laila Samuels	"Afterglow"	25,374	4,851	6,479	5,937	6,224	48,865	4
2	Suite 16	"Anna Lee"	31,003	5,548	6,667	4,881	8,572	56,671	3
3	Agnete	"Icebreaker"	67,334	51,097	14,898	14,825	18,574	166,728	1
4	Freddy Kalas	"Feel Da Rush"	48,154	11,616	8,562	8,998	10,798	88,128	2

=== Preparation ===
In late March 2016, Agnete filmed a music video for "Icebreaker" on the sea ice in Varangerbotn and at the Sorrisniva Igloo Hotel in Alta. The video, which was directed by Elle Marja Eira and produced by Davás Film, was released to the public on 22 April.

=== Promotion ===
Agnete announced in mid-March 2016 that she planned to complete a 13 nation promo tour ahead of the Eurovision Song Contest, which included stops in Sweden, Denmark, Finland, the Netherlands, United Kingdom, Russia, Hungary, Germany, Spain, Romania, Poland, Greece and France. The promo tour was to be sponsored by the municipality where Agnete comes from, Nesseby Municipality, which agreed to fund her campaign with NOK 75,000. However, Agnete contracted a viral infection prior to the start of her promotional tour and ended up cancelling all appearance dates in the interest of recovering in time for the Eurovision Song Contest.

== At Eurovision ==
According to Eurovision rules, all nations with the exceptions of the host country and the "Big Five" (France, Germany, Italy, Spain and the United Kingdom) are required to qualify from one of two semi-finals in order to compete for the final; the top ten countries from each semi-final progress to the final. The European Broadcasting Union (EBU) split up the competing countries into six different pots based on voting patterns from previous contests, with countries with favourable voting histories put into the same pot. On 25 January 2016, a special allocation draw was held which placed each country into one of the two semi-finals, as well as which half of the show they would perform in. Norway was placed into the second semi-final, to be held on 12 May 2016, and was scheduled to perform in the second half of the show.

Once all the competing songs for the 2016 contest had been released, the running order for the semi-finals was decided by the shows' producers rather than through another draw, so that similar songs were not placed next to each other. Norway was set to perform in position 16, following the entry from Ukraine and before the entry from Georgia. However, following Romania's disqualification from the contest on 22 April and subsequent removal from the running order of the second semi-final, Norway's performing position shifted to 15.

In Norway, the two semi-finals and the final were broadcast on NRK1 with commentary by Olav Viksmo-Slettan. An alternative broadcast of the final was also televised on NRK3 with commentary by the hosts of the NRK P3 radio show P3morgen Ronny Brede Aase, Silje Reiten Nordnes and Markus Ekrem Neby. The second semi-final and final were also broadcast via radio on NRK P1 with commentary by Ole Christian Øen. NRK1 Tegnspråk broadcast the three shows interpreted in International Sign for the deaf and sign language users. The Norwegian spokesperson, who announced the top 12-point score awarded by the Norwegian jury during the final, was Elisabeth Andreassen, who represented Sweden in 1982 and Norway in 1985, 1994 and 1996; Andreassen formed half of the duo Bobbysocks!, which won the competition for Norway in 1985.

=== Semi-final ===
Agnete during a rehearsal before the second semi-final

Agnete took part in technical rehearsals on 5 and 7 May, followed by dress rehearsals on 11 and 12 May. This included the jury show on 11 May where the professional juries of each country watched and voted on the competing entries.

The Norwegian performance featured Agnete performing on stage in a white crop top with long sleeves and a long skirt together with one dancer. Agnete and the dancer began the performance on raised platforms; Agnete descended off the platform while the dancer remained on their platform to perform a choreographed routine. The stage colours were predominantly blue and the LED screens displayed icy Arctic landscapes. The dancer on stage with Agnete was Sara Christine Einbu. Agnete was also joined by four off-stage backing vocalists: Gabriel Alares, Ingunn Dalland, Nicoline Berg Kaasin and Charlotte Bredesen.

At the end of the show, Norway was not announced among the top 10 entries in the second semi-final and therefore failed to qualify to compete in the final. It was later revealed that Norway placed thirteenth in the semi-final, receiving a total of 63 points: 34 points from the televoting and 29 points from the juries.

=== Voting ===
Voting during the three shows was conducted under a new system that involved each country now awarding two sets of points from 1–8, 10 and 12: one from their professional jury and the other from televoting. Each nation's jury consisted of five music industry professionals who are citizens of the country they represent, with their names published before the contest to ensure transparency. This jury judged each entry based on: vocal capacity; the stage performance; the song's composition and originality; and the overall impression by the act. In addition, no member of a national jury was permitted to be related in any way to any of the competing acts in such a way that they cannot vote impartially and independently. The individual rankings of each jury member as well as the nation's televoting results were released shortly after the grand final.

Below is a breakdown of points awarded to Norway and awarded by Norway in the second semi-final and grand final of the contest, and the breakdown of the jury voting and televoting conducted during the two shows:

==== Points awarded to Norway ====
Points awarded to Norway (Semi-final 2)
Score	Televote	Jury
12 points		
10 points	Albania; Denmark	
8 points		
7 points		
6 points		Belarus; Denmark
5 points		Australia
4 points		Belgium; Lithuania
3 points	Belarus; Serbia	
2 points	Lithuania; Macedonia; Slovenia	Switzerland
1 point	Bulgaria; Ukraine	Georgia; United Kingdom

==== Points awarded by Norway ====
Points awarded by Norway (Semi-final 2)
Score	Televote	Jury
12 points	Lithuania	Australia
10 points	Poland	Bulgaria
8 points	Australia	Lithuania
7 points	Belgium	Belgium
6 points	Bulgaria	Ukraine
5 points	Denmark	Israel
4 points	Ukraine	Poland
3 points	Latvia	Ireland
2 points	Ireland	Latvia
1 point	Israel	Georgia

Points awarded by Norway (Final)
Score	Televote	Jury
12 points	Lithuania	Italy
10 points	Poland	Australia
8 points	Australia	Bulgaria
7 points	Sweden	Spain
6 points	Russia	Netherlands
5 points	Bulgaria	Belgium
4 points	Ukraine	Ukraine
3 points	Latvia	Israel
2 points	Belgium	Lithuania
1 point	France	Poland

==== Detailed voting results ====
The following members comprised the Norwegian jury:

- Pernille Torp-Holte (jury chairperson) – general manager
- Thomas Anholt (Tom Stereo) – artist
- Nicholas Emmanuel Carlie – vocalist, music journalist, television and radio host
- Christian Ingebrigtsen – artist, songwriter
- Mia Gundersen – artist, singer

Detailed voting results from Norway (Semi-final 2)
R/O	Country	Jury							Televote	
R/O	Country	P. Torp-Holte	T. Stereo	N.E. Carlie	C. Ingebrigtsen	M. Gundersen	Rank	Points	Rank	Points
01	Latvia	10	11	9	12	7	9	2	8	3
02	Poland	1	5	10	15	4	7	4	2	10
03	Switzerland	12	6	11	11	17	14		17	
04	Israel	16	1	3	3	10	6	5	10	1
05	Belarus	9	9	14	10	13	13		12	
06	Serbia	15	17	13	16	8	15		13	
07	Ireland	6	4	12	6	11	8	3	9	2
08	Macedonia	17	16	17	17	15	17		14	
09	Lithuania	3	10	2	2	5	3	8	1	12
10	Australia	5	3	5	1	3	1	12	3	8
11	Slovenia	13	13	8	8	9	11		15	
12	Bulgaria	2	2	4	9	2	2	10	5	6
13	Denmark	11	7	16	7	14	12		6	5
14	Ukraine	8	12	6	4	1	5	6	7	4
15	Norway									
16	Georgia	7	15	7	14	6	10	1	11	
17	Albania	14	14	15	13	16	16		16	
18	Belgium	4	8	1	5	12	4	7	4	7

Detailed voting results from Norway (Final)
R/O	Country	Jury							Televote	
R/O	Country	P. Torp-Holte	T. Stereo	N.E. Carlie	C. Ingebrigtsen	M. Gundersen	Rank	Points	Rank	Points
01	Belgium	8	9	1	8	12	6	5	9	2
02	Czech Republic	12	11	13	14	5	11		26	
03	Netherlands	4	7	5	2	10	5	6	11	
04	Azerbaijan	14	8	16	18	20	17		22	
05	Hungary	26	25	26	26	17	25		17	
06	Italy	2	3	2	1	6	1	12	14	
07	Israel	15	5	6	11	15	8	3	18	
08	Bulgaria	1	2	7	15	1	3	8	6	5
09	Sweden	13	6	11	12	14	12		4	7
10	Germany	23	20	23	23	22	23		19	
11	France	11	12	21	6	19	14		10	1
12	Poland	3	13	15	17	7	10	1	2	10
13	Australia	5	10	3	3	4	2	10	3	8
14	Cyprus	22	23	24	25	25	24		15	
15	Serbia	24	19	20	24	18	22		23	
16	Lithuania	6	17	4	4	24	9	2	1	12
17	Croatia	18	18	18	13	8	16		25	
18	Russia	19	1	17	10	11	13		5	6
19	Spain	7	4	9	5	3	4	7	13	
20	Latvia	17	15	19	19	16	19		8	3
21	Ukraine	9	21	10	9	2	7	4	7	4
22	Malta	16	16	14	21	23	21		24	
23	Georgia	20	24	12	22	9	20		20	
24	Austria	21	14	22	7	21	18		12	
25	United Kingdom	10	22	8	16	13	15		16	
26	Armenia	25	26	25	20	26	26		21	
