= Varanger Sami Museum =

Sami History & Culture Museum

Coordinates: 70.1724°N 28.5603°E

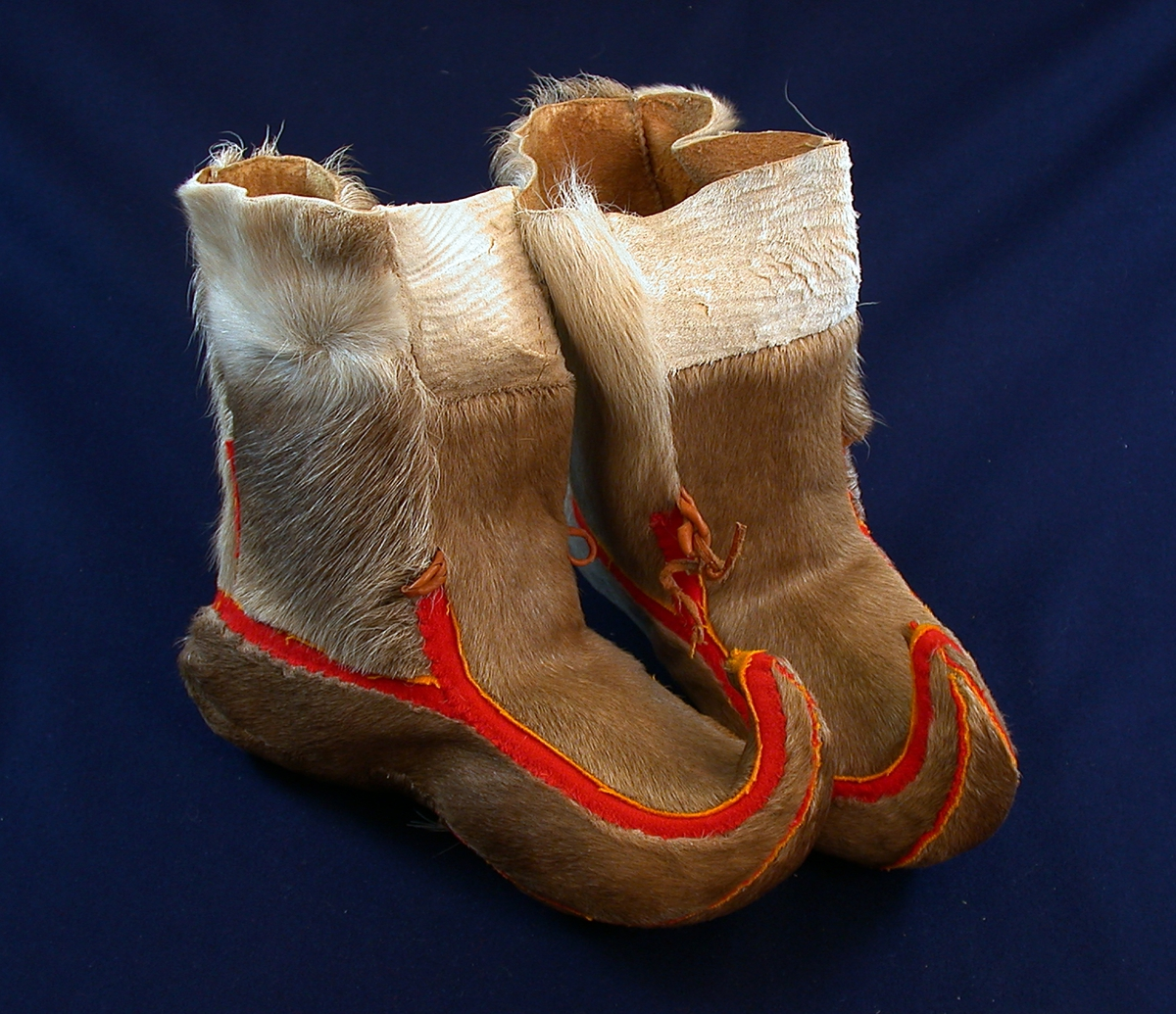
Sami boots (Northern Sami: Seahkohat), made from brown and white hide from a reindeer leg, exhibited at the Varanger Sami Museum.

The Varanger Sami Museum (Northern Sami: Várjjat Sámi Musea, Norwegian: Varanger Samiske Museum, VSM) is a museum for Sami culture and history in Varangerbotn in Unjárga Municipality in Finnmark county, Norway.

The museum is working with the Sea Sami history along Varangerfjord, Sami prehistory, and contemporary Sami culture. The museum was established in 1983, and has since 2012 been a part of the joint museum Deanu ja Várjjat Museasiida.

The main building was erected in 1994, inspired by traditional Sami architecture. The main building contains a basis exhibition, the children's room Stállobiedju (the Stallo's den) and temporary exhibitions. VSM is also maintaining the cultural landscape and the excavations at Mortensnes (Ceavccageađge).
