= Polmak Municipality =

Former municipality in Finnmark, Norway

Polmak Municipality Polmak herred Buolbmát (Northern Sami)
- Former municipality
- Finnmark within Norway

- Polmak within Finnmark
- Coordinates: 70°04′11″N 28°00′40″E
- Country: Norway
- County: Finnmark
- District: Øst-Finnmark
- Established: 1 Jan 1903
  - Preceded by: Nesseby Municipality
- Disestablished: 1 Jan 1964
  - Succeeded by: Tana Municipality
- Administrative centre: Polmak

Government
  - Mayor (1962-1963): Reidar Dybvik

Area (upon dissolution)
  - Total: 2,257.5 km^{2} (871.6 sq mi)
  - Rank: #16 in Norway
- Highest elevation: 1,067 m (3,501 ft)

Population (1963)
  - Total: 1,040
  - Rank: #605 in Norway
  - Density: 0.5/km^{2} (1.3/sq mi)
- Demonym: Polmak-folk

Official language
  - Norwegian form: Bokmål
- Time zone: UTC+01:00 (CET)
  - Summer (DST): UTC+02:00 (CEST)
- ISO 3166 code: NO-2026

Polmak is a former municipality in Finnmark county, Norway. The 2,257.5-square-kilometre (871.6 sq mi) municipality existed from 1903 until its dissolution in 1964. The area is now part of Tana Municipality. The administrative centre was the village of Polmak where Polmak Church is located.

Prior to its dissolution in 1964, the 2,257.5-square-kilometre (871.6 sq mi) municipality was the 16th largest by area out of the 689 municipalities in Norway. Polmak Municipality was the 605th most populous municipality in Norway with a population of about 1,040 (in 1963). The municipality's population density was 0.5 inhabitants per square kilometre (1.3/sq mi).

== History ==
The municipality of Polmak was established on 1 January 1903 when the large Nesseby Municipality was divided in two: Polmak (population: 450) in the west and Nesseby (population: 1,058) in the east. During the 1960s, there were many municipal mergers across Norway due to the work of the Schei Committee. On 1 January 1964, the neighboring municipalities of Polmak (population: 1,072) and Tana (population: 2,237) were merged to form a new, larger Tana Municipality.

=== Name ===
The municipality (originally the parish) is named "Polmak". It is possibly a Norwegianization of the Northern Sámi name for the area, Buolbmát. The meaning of the name is uncertain.

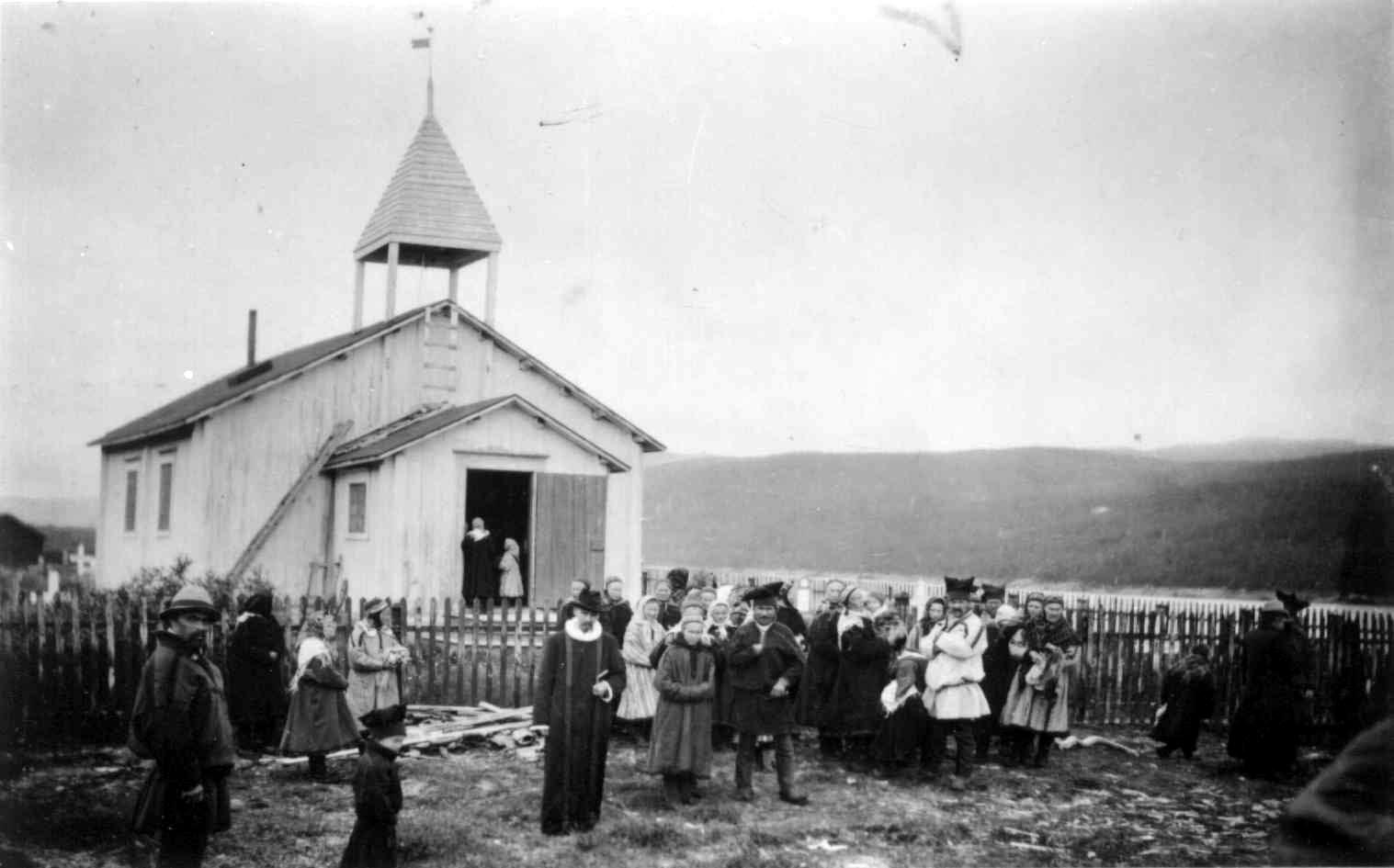
Historic photo of Polmak Church and parishioners

=== Churches ===
The Church of Norway had one parish (sokn) within Polmak Municipality. It was part of the Nesseby prestegjeld and the Varanger prosti (deanery) in the Diocese of Nord-Hålogaland.

Churches in Polmak Municipality
Parish (sokn)	Church name	Location of the church	Year built
Polmak	Polmak Church	Polmak	1853

== Geography ==
Polmak Municipality stretched along the northern shore of the Tana River (which also forms the border with Finland) from the little village of Leavvajohka in the west to the village of Polmak in the east and then it continues on both sides of the Tana River northwards to the Tana Bridge. The municipality included the upper Tana River valley, along the border with Finland. The highest point in the municipality was the 1,067-metre (3,501 ft) tall mountain Rásttigáisá, on the border with neighboring Lebesby Municipality.

== Government ==
While it existed, Polmak Municipality was responsible for primary education (through 10th grade), outpatient health services, senior citizen services, welfare and other social services, zoning, economic development, and municipal roads and utilities. The municipality was governed by a municipal council of directly elected representatives. The mayor was indirectly elected by a vote of the municipal council. The municipality was under the jurisdiction of the Hålogaland Court of Appeal.

=== Municipal council ===
The municipal council (Herredsstyre) of Polmak Municipality was made up of representatives that were elected to four year terms. The tables below show the historical composition of the council by political party.

Polmak herredsstyre 1960–1963
Party name (in Norwegian)	Number of representatives
Labour Party (Arbeiderpartiet)	5
Conservative Party (Høyre)	5
Communist Party (Kommunistiske Parti)	1
Local List(s) (Lokale lister)	4
Total number of members:	15
Note: On 1 January 1964, Polmak Municipality became part of Tana Municipality.

Polmak herredsstyre 1956–1959
Party name (in Norwegian)	Number of representatives
Labour Party (Arbeiderpartiet)	9
Conservative Party (Høyre)	4
Communist Party (Kommunistiske Parti)	1
Local List(s) (Lokale lister)	1
Total number of members:	15

Polmak herredsstyre 1952–1955
Party name (in Norwegian)	Number of representatives
Labour Party (Arbeiderpartiet)	5
Conservative Party (Høyre)	4
List of workers, fishermen, and small farmholders (Arbeidere, fiskere, småbrukere liste)	2
Local List(s) (Lokale lister)	1
Total number of members:	12

Polmak herredsstyre 1948–1951
Party name (in Norwegian)	Number of representatives
Labour Party (Arbeiderpartiet)	3
List of workers, fishermen, and small farmholders (Arbeidere, fiskere, småbrukere liste)	1
Local List(s) (Lokale lister)	8
Total number of members:	12

Polmak herredsstyre 1945–1947
Party name (in Norwegian)	Number of representatives
Labour Party (Arbeiderpartiet)	4
List of workers, fishermen, and small farmholders (Arbeidere, fiskere, småbrukere liste)	4
Local List(s) (Lokale lister)	4
Total number of members:	12

Polmak herredsstyre 1938–1941*
Party name (in Norwegian)	Number of representatives
Labour Party (Arbeiderpartiet)	3
Local List(s) (Lokale lister)	9
Total number of members:	12
Note: Due to the German occupation of Norway during World War II, no elections were held for new municipal councils until after the war ended in 1945.

=== Mayors ===
The mayor (Norwegian: ordfører) of Polmak Municipality was the political leader of the municipality and the chairperson of the municipal council. The following people have held this position:

- 1903–1913: Aamund Nodland
- 1914–1916: Gustav Adolf Lilleng
- 1917–1931: Ole Erik Tapio
- 1923–1934: Jens Eriksen
- 1935–1944: Jacob Tapio
- 1944–1945: Ole Torberg Nodland
- 1945–1945: Jens Eriksen
- 1946–1948: Johannes Ballovara
- 1948–1951: John Solbakk
- 1951–1952: Birger Pedersen
- 1952–1959: Arne Isaksen
- 1959–1959: John Solbakk
- 1960–1961: Jann Olsen
- 1962–1963: Reidar Dybvik

== See also ==
- List of former municipalities of Norway
