= Søren Kristian Sommerfelt =

Norwegian priest

Søren Kristian Sommerfelt (23 May 1851 – 13 June 1934) was a Norwegian priest.

He was born in Nesseby Municipality as a son of vicar Christian Sommerfelt (1819–1904) and Ida Fougner. He was a nephew of Karl Linné Sommerfeldt, grandson of Søren Christian Sommerfeldt, great-grandson of Christian Sommerfeldt and great-grandnephew of Ole Hannibal Sommerfeldt.

In 1877 he married Jørgine Marie Hiorth, a daughter of merchant Adam Hiorth and Sofie Sommerfelt. She was his first cousin, and Adam Hiorth thus his uncle.

He finished his secondary education in 1869, and graduated from the Royal Frederick University with the cand.theol. in 1874. He worked at the school Kristiania Borger- og Realskole for four years. He was a curate at Østre Aker Church from 1878 and Gamlebyen Church from 1880, then vicar in Gamlebyen from 1899 to 1919, succeeding Thorvald Klaveness.
