= Unmack =

Unmack is a surname. Notable people with the surname include:

- Martin Andreas Unmack (c. 1753–1806), Norwegian civil servant
- Theodore Unmack (1835–1919), Australian politician
- Svend Unmack Larsen (1893–1965), Danish politician
