= Karlebotn =

Karlebotn (Norwegian); Stuorravuonna (Northern Sami); Isovuono (Kven)
- Village
- Interactive map of: Karlebotn (Norwegian); Stuorravuonna (Northern Sami); Isovuono (Kven)
- Location within Finnmark Location within Norway
- Coordinates: 70°07′21″N 28°34′31″E
- Country: Norway
- Region: Northern Norway
- County: Finnmark
- District: Øst-Finnmark
- Municipality: Nesseby
- Elevation: 11 m (36 ft)
- Time zone: UTC+01:00 (CET)
  - Summer (DST): UTC+02:00 (CEST)
- Post Code: 9840 Varangerbotn

Karlebotn (Norwegian), Stuorravuonna (Northern Sami), or Isovuono (Kven) is a village in Nesseby Municipality in Finnmark county, Norway. The village lies on the southern shore of the inner part of the Varangerfjorden, about 8 kilometres (5.0 mi) southeast of the municipal centre of Varangerbotn. The statistical area of Karlebotn, which also includes the peripheral parts of the village, as well as the surrounding countryside, has a population of 93.

== Archaeology ==
Excavation in the 2020s, have shown structure of [at least one] dwelling [or part of a settlement,] that seems to be from the later Stone Age.

['the Karlebotn man'] Karlebotnmannen is a figure that has been "cut out of horn" from reindeer; it has been dated to around 2000 years before common era; the figure was found in Karlebotn.

== Media gallery ==
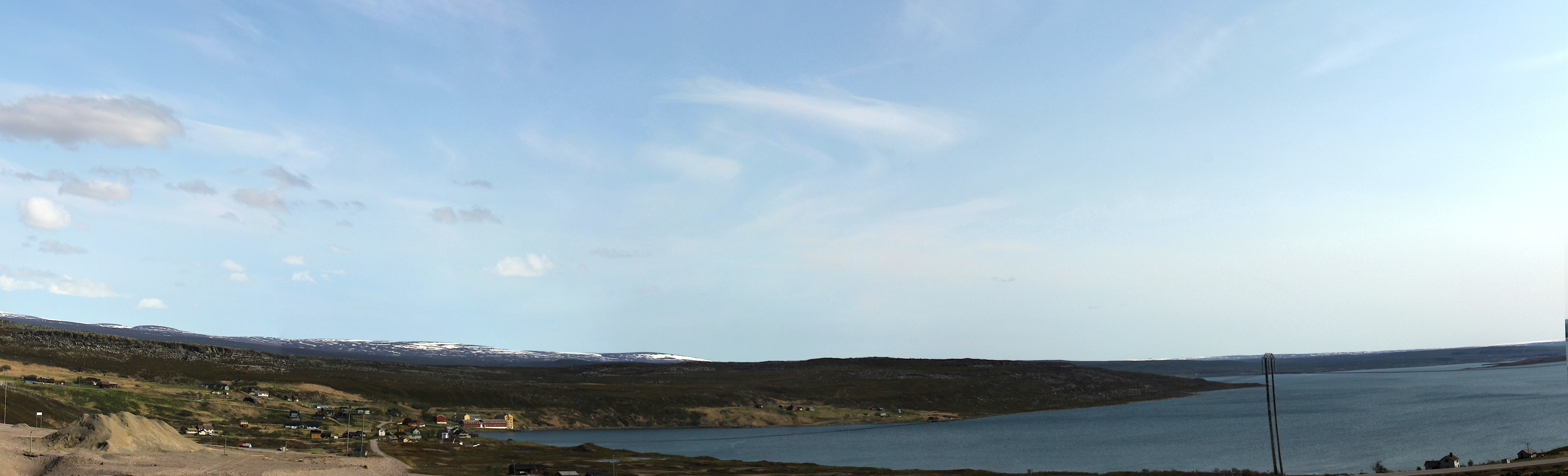
View of Karlebotn
