= Hilmar Meincke Krohg =

Norwegian politician (1776–1851)

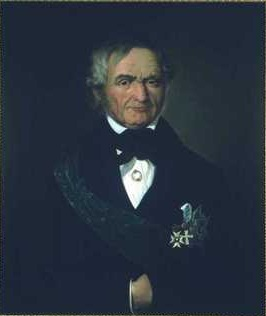
Hilmar Meincke Krohg.

Hilmar Meincke Krohg (1 January 1776 – 13 August 1851) was a Norwegian politician and elected official. He served as a representative at the Norwegian Constitutional Assembly.

== Biography ==
Hilmar Meincke Krohg was born in Trondheim, Norway. He attended the Trondheim Cathedral School and later earned his law degree in 1799 at the University of Copenhagen. He was appointed district governor in Finnmark in 1811. He was subsequently transferred to Nordre Bergenhus Amt (now Sogn og Fjordane), but before he could take office, he was appointed to be the County Governor of Romsdals Amt (now Møre og Romsdal), a position he held until 1840.

He was a member of the Norwegian Constitutional Assembly at Eidsvoll in 1814, where he joined the independence party (Selvstendighetspartiet). He was also elected to the first session of the Norwegian Parliament in 1814. He was later elected in 1824 and 1830, representing the constituency of Romsdals Amt.

== Personal life ==
In 1803, he married Cecilia Edel Sophie Stub (1786–1864). They were the parents of nine children.

== Honors ==
Krogh was awarded the Order of the Dannebrog, Order of the Polar Star and Order of Vasa

== Related Reading ==
- Holme Jørn (2014) De kom fra alle kanter - Eidsvollsmennene og deres hus (Oslo: Cappelen Damm) ISBN 978-82-02-44564-5

Government offices
Preceded by Martin Andreas Unmack	County Governor of Finnmarkens amt 1806–1811	Succeeded by Fredrik Wilhelm; Wedel-Jarlsberg
Preceded by Niels Andreas Vibe	County Governor of Nordre Bergenhus amt 1811; He was appointed by didn't take office.	Succeeded by Herman Gerhard Treschow
Preceded by Ole Hannibal Sommerfeldt	County Governor of Romsdals amt 1811–1840	Succeeded by Gudbrand Thesen
