= Pinne for landet =

Single by Freddy Kalas
- Released: 25 December 2014
- Genre: Pop
- Label: Alter Ego Music

Freddy Kalas singles chronology
"Pinne for landet" (2014)	"Fest hos Kalas" (2015)

"Pinne for landet" is a debut single by Norwegian singer Freddy Kalas, which was released on 25 December 2014 by Alter Ego Music. The song has peaked at number 1 on the Norwegian singles chart. One year later "Pinne for Sverige" was released.

== Track listing ==
Digital download
No.	Title	Length
1.	"Pinne for landet"	3:17

== Music video ==
The music video was uploaded to YouTube on 26 December 2014.

== Charts ==
Chart (2015–16)	Peak position
Norway (VG-lista)	1
Sweden (Sverigetopplistan)	78

=== Pinne for Sverige ===
Chart (2016)	Peak position
Sweden (Sverigetopplistan)	59

== Release history ==
Region	Date	Format	Label
Norway	25 December 2014	Digital Download	Alter Ego Music
