= Christen Heiberg (civil servant) =

Norwegian civil servant (1737–1801)

- Born: 21 February 1737; Vinje, Norway
- Died: 21 April 1801 (aged 64)
- Occupation: civil servant

Christen Heiberg (21 February 1737 – 21 April 1801) was a Norwegian civil servant.

He was born in Vinje. He served as County Governor of Finnmark from 1778 to 1787. He died in Neksø, Denmark, in 1801.

Government offices
| Preceded by Thorkild Fjeldsted | County Governor of Finnmarkens amt 1778–1787 | Succeeded by Ole Hannibal Sommerfelt |
