= Melodi Grand Prix Junior 2008 =

Norwegian television song competition

Date and venue
- Final: 5 September 2008
- Venue: Oslo Spektrum; Oslo, Norway

Organisation
- Broadcaster: Norsk rikskringkasting (NRK)
- Presenter: Stian Barsnes-Simonsen

Participants
- Number of entries: 10

Vote
- Voting system: Televoting, the winner is the one with most votes
- Winning song: "Oro jaska, beana" by The BlackSheeps

The Melodi Grand Prix Junior 2008 was Norway's seventh national Melodi Grand Prix Junior for young singers aged 8 to 15. It was held on September 5, 2008 at the Oslo Spektrum, courtesy of NRK.

Over 500 submitted proposals for participation to NRK. The BlackSheeps won with their song "Oro jaska, beana" and went on to represent Norway in MGP Nordic 2008 which they also won.

== Results ==
=== First round ===
No.	Artist	Song	Result
01	The Battery	"Tenke nå"	Super finalist
02	Amalie Grani	"Min familie"	Super finalist
03	Erlend Arnesen	"Hun ga drømmen en sjanse"	Eliminated
04	Vy-Vy Tran	"På et annet sted"	Eliminated
05	Martinius Espeland	"Bling Bling"	Eliminated
06	Road to Rock	"Veien tilbake hjem"	Eliminated
07	Margrete Skretting "Maggie" Bergset	"Du er bra nok"	Eliminated
08	CaroMilie	"Vi liker å danse"	Super finalist
09	Kristian Møller Krystad	"Feber"	Eliminated
10	The BlackSheeps	"Oro jaska, beana"	Super finalist

=== Super Final ===
Here's the results from the superfinal. Highlighted contestants went to MGP Nordic 2008.

No.	Artist	Song	Position	Votes
01	The Battery	"Tenke nå"	2	35,057
02	Amalie Grani	"Min familie"	4	14,544
03	CaroMilie	"Vi liker å danse"	3	25,670
04	The BlackSheeps	"Oro jaska, beana"	1	74,486
