= Nesseby Church =

- Nesseby kirke
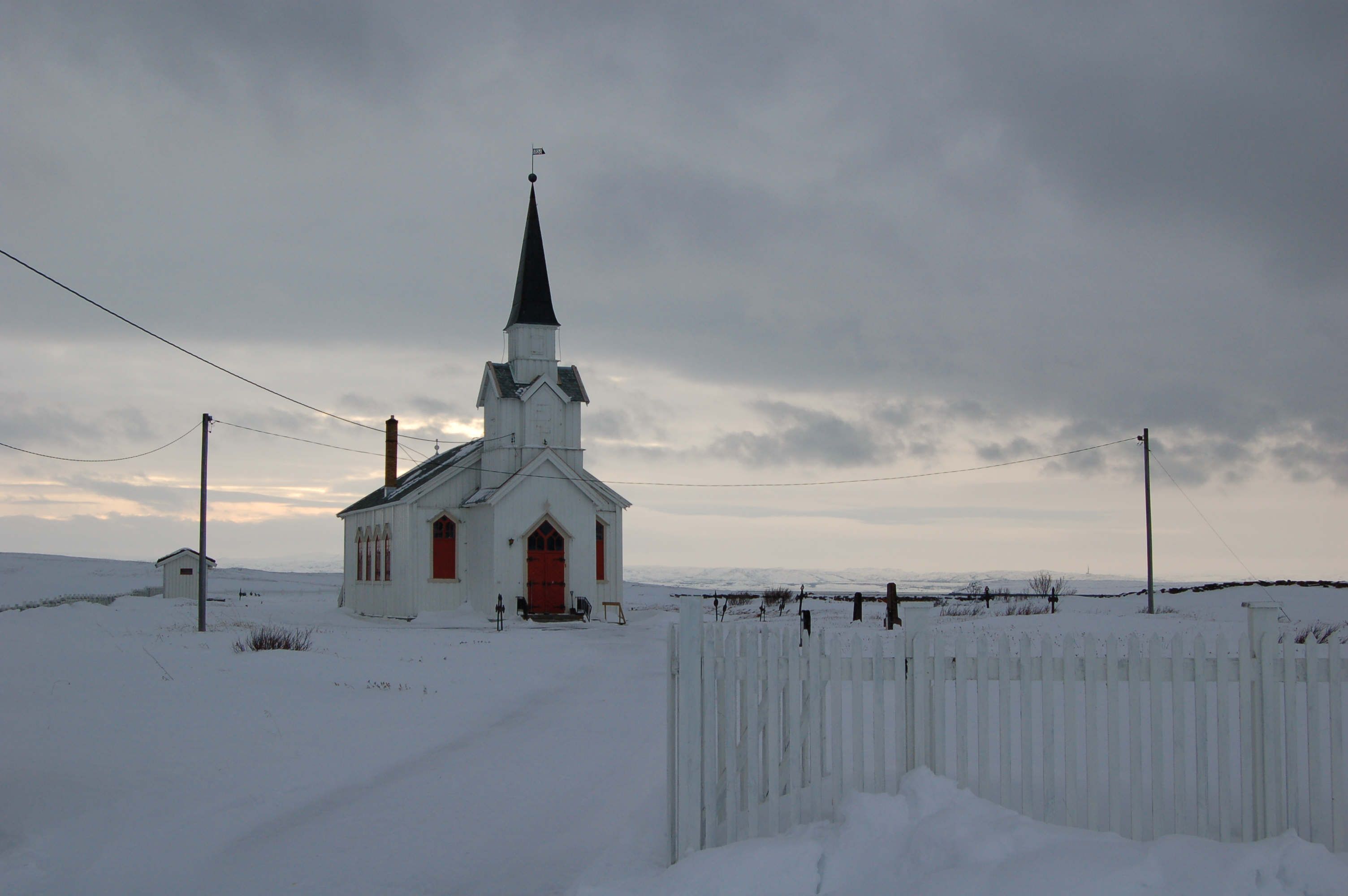
- View of the church
- Nesseby Church
- 70.1449425°N 28.8602498°E
- Location: Nesseby Municipality, Finnmark
- Country: Norway
- Denomination: Church of Norway
- Churchmanship: Evangelical Lutheran

History
- Status: Parish church
- Founded: 1719
- Consecrated: 17 Aug 1858

Architecture
- Functional status: Active
- Architect: Christian Heinrich Grosch
- Architectural type: Long church
- Completed: 1858 (168 years ago)

Specifications
- Capacity: 250
- Materials: Wood

Administration
- Diocese: Nord-Hålogaland
- Deanery: Indre Finnmark prosti
- Parish: Nesseby
- Norwegian Cultural Heritage Site
- Type: Church
- Status: Listed
- ID: 85124

Nesseby Church (Norwegian: Nesseby kirke) is a parish church of the Church of Norway in Nesseby Municipality in Finnmark county, Norway. It is located in the village of Nesseby, overlooking the Varangerfjorden. It is the church for the Nesseby parish which is part of the Indre Finnmark prosti (deanery) in the Diocese of Nord-Hålogaland. The prayer books in this church are in the Northern Sami language, since that is the predominant language for the people of the area. The church is one of the few old buildings left in Finnmark (the retreating German army burned most at the end of World War II). Adjacent to the church is a small storage building that is regarded by some as the oldest building in the Varanger area, dating from the 18th century.

== History ==
The first church in Nesseby was located in Angsnes and it was built in 1719 by Thomas von Westen. It was consecrated on 11 November 1719. The church was poorly maintained and it had been built on the south side of the fjord, while most development was occurring on the north side of the fjord. That church was torn down in 1746. Soon after, a new church was built at the present church site, about 4 kilometres (2.5 mi) east of Angsnes on the north side of the fjord. The new church was consecrated in 1747. Some of the materials in the church such as the altar and pulpit were reused from the old chapel in Kiberg. In 1854, the old church was torn down and construction immediately began on a new church on the same site. The new wooden building was designed by Christian Heinrich Grosch and it had seats for 250 people. It was consecrated on 17 August 1858. The new church has a nave that measures 12 by 9.1 metres (39 ft × 30 ft) and a choir that measures 5.1 by 5.1 metres (17 ft × 17 ft). The church has a 22-metre (72 ft) tall tower above the main entrance. The church was fully restored in 1983.

== Design ==
The church has a narrow choir whose floor is higher than that of the nave. There are sacristies beside the choir, which has a lower ceiling, of a type called a "saddle ceiling", than that of the nave. The roof is supported by wooden columns which separate the central nave from two side-naves. This style was used in churches designed by Grosch in the 1850s. The nave is also distinguished from the two side-naves by the fact that the latter have lower ceilings, a feature which, apparently, Grosch derived from German church design.

== Media gallery ==
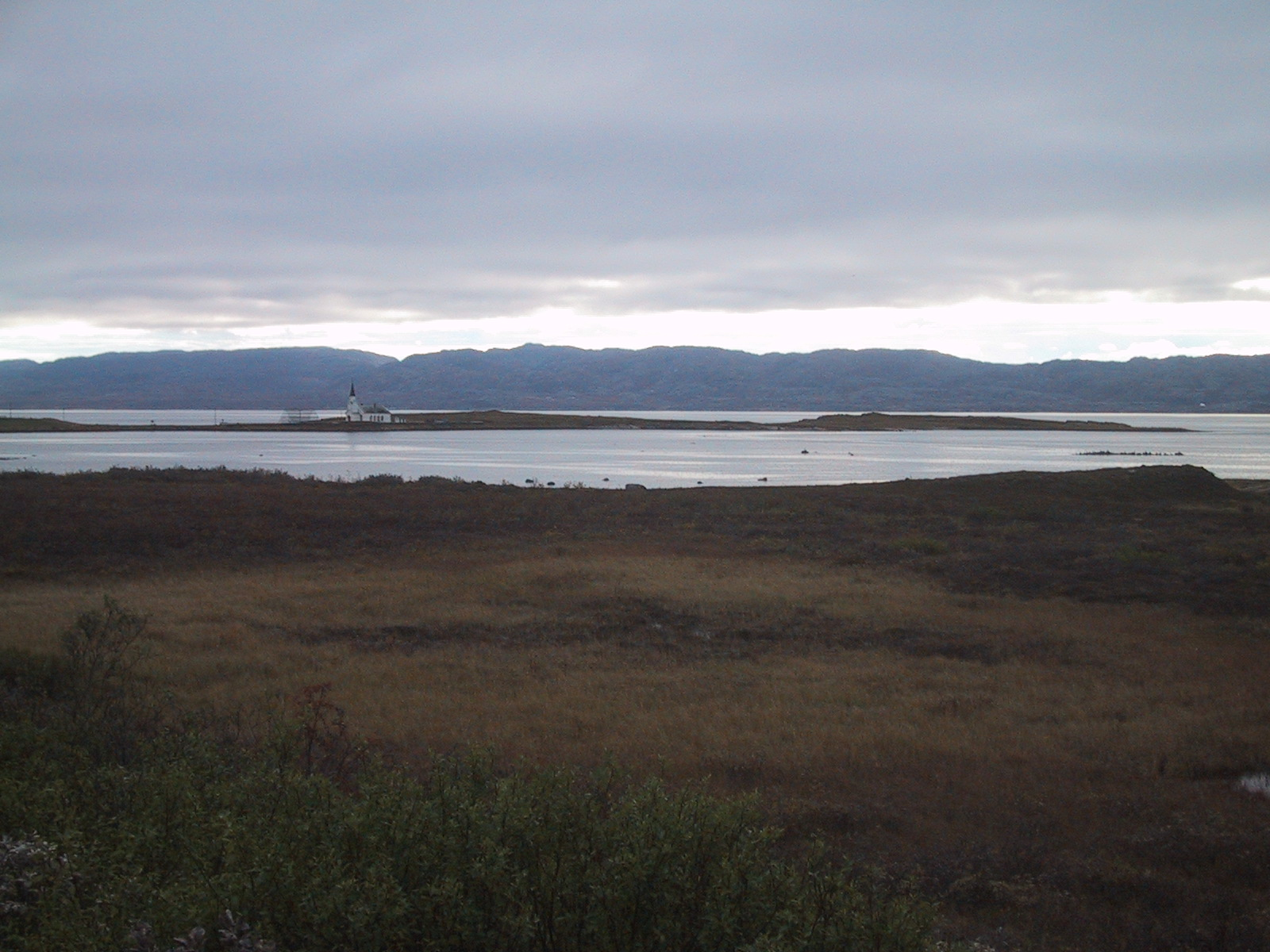
View of the church on the little peninsula

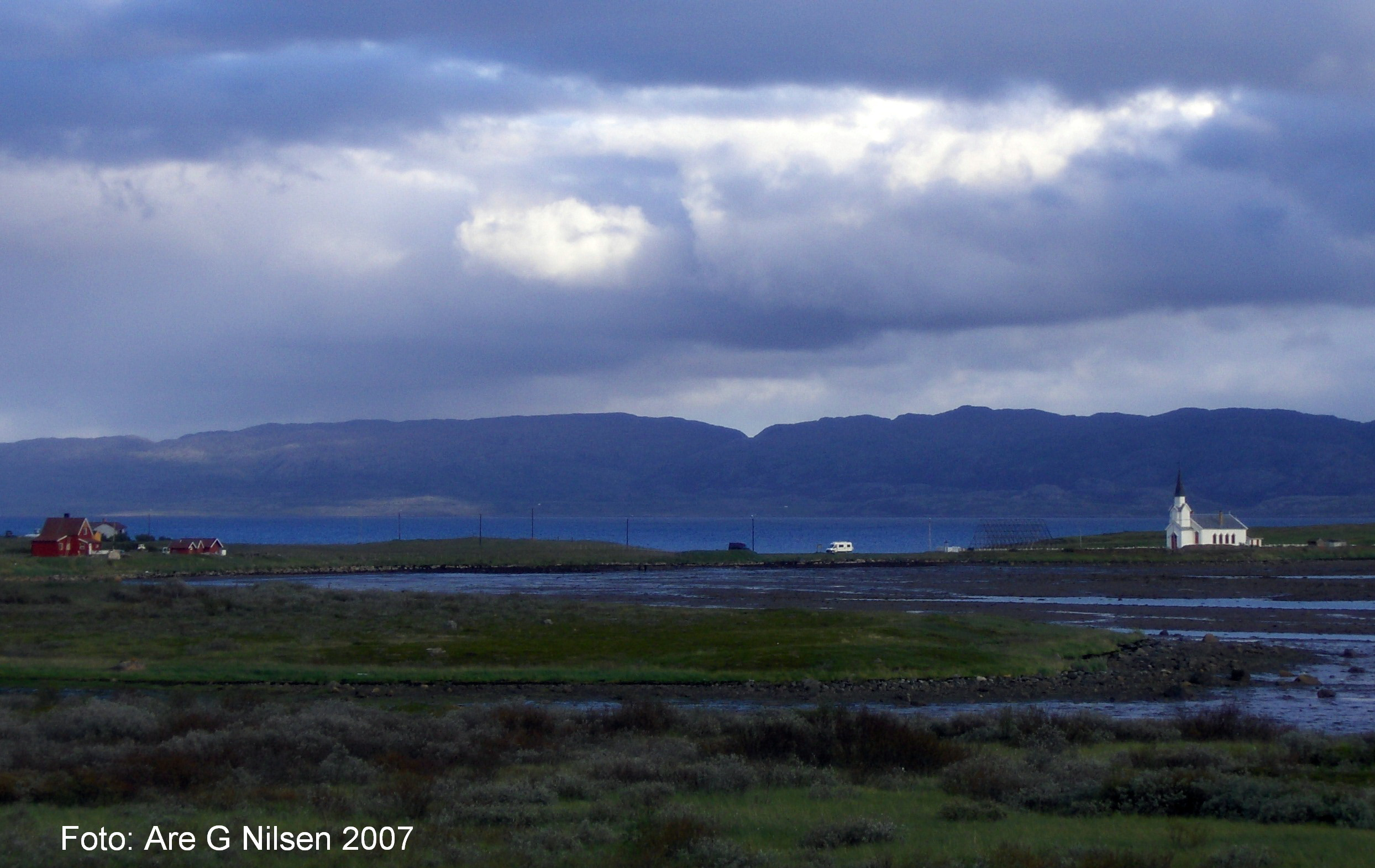
View of the church from a distance

== See also ==
- List of churches in Nord-Hålogaland
