= Polmak Church =

- Polmak kirke
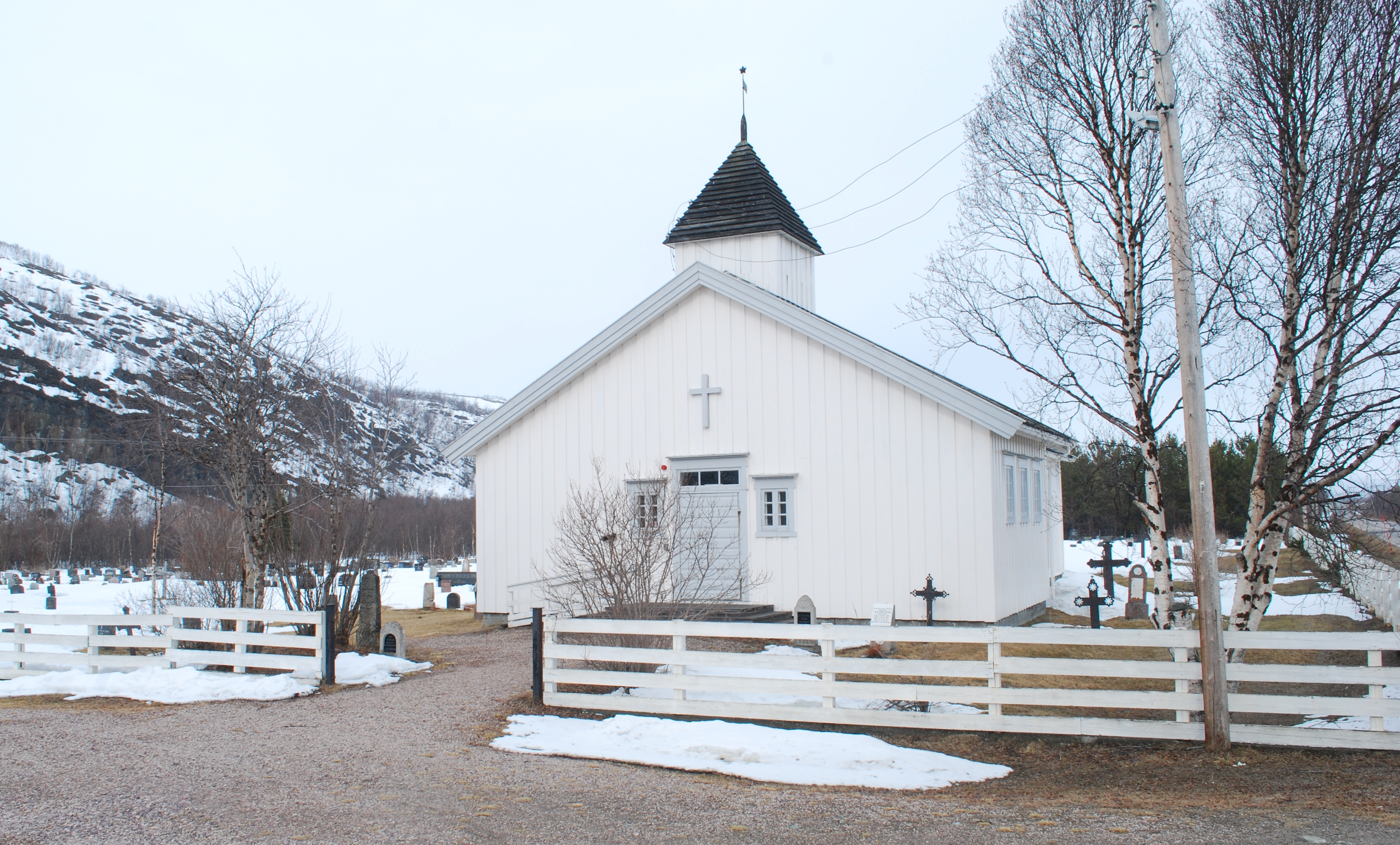
- View of the church
- Polmak Church
- 70.0751096°N 27.995556°E
- Location: Deatnu-Tana Municipality, Finnmark
- Country: Norway
- Denomination: Church of Norway
- Churchmanship: Evangelical Lutheran

History
- Status: Parish church
- Founded: 1853
- Consecrated: 27 March 1853

Architecture
- Functional status: Active
- Architect: J.H. Nebelong
- Architectural type: Long church
- Completed: 1853 (173 years ago)

Specifications
- Capacity: 120
- Materials: Wood

Administration
- Diocese: Nord-Hålogaland
- Deanery: Indre Finnmark prosti
- Parish: Tana
- Norwegian Cultural Heritage Site
- Type: Church
- Status: Listed
- ID: 85262

Polmak Church (Norwegian: Polmak kirke) is a parish church of the Church of Norway in Deatnu-Tana Municipality in Finnmark county, Norway. It is located in the village of Polmak, just east of the border with Finland. It is one of the churches for the Tana parish which is part of the Indre Finnmark prosti (deanery) in the Diocese of Nord-Hålogaland. The white, wooden church was built in a long church style in 1853 using plans drawn up by the architect J.H. Nebelong. The church seats about 120 people.

== History ==
In 1847, the King authorized the construction of a new church in Polmak. The church was consecrated on 27 March 1853 by the local Provost Søren Christian Sommerfelt. The church is one of the few in Finnmark that were not burned by the retreating German army near the end of World War II. By the end of the war, the church was in need of repairs, so the Riksantikvaren commissioned Trond Dancke to renovate and improve the building in 1959. The entryway was rebuilt and the nave expanded during this renovation.

In 2014, the former parish of Polmak was merged into the parish of Tana. Previously, Polmak parish was made up of one church; after the merger, the new Tana parish included three churches.

== See also ==
- List of churches in Nord-Hålogaland
