= Even Hammer =

Norwegian civil servant (1732–1800)

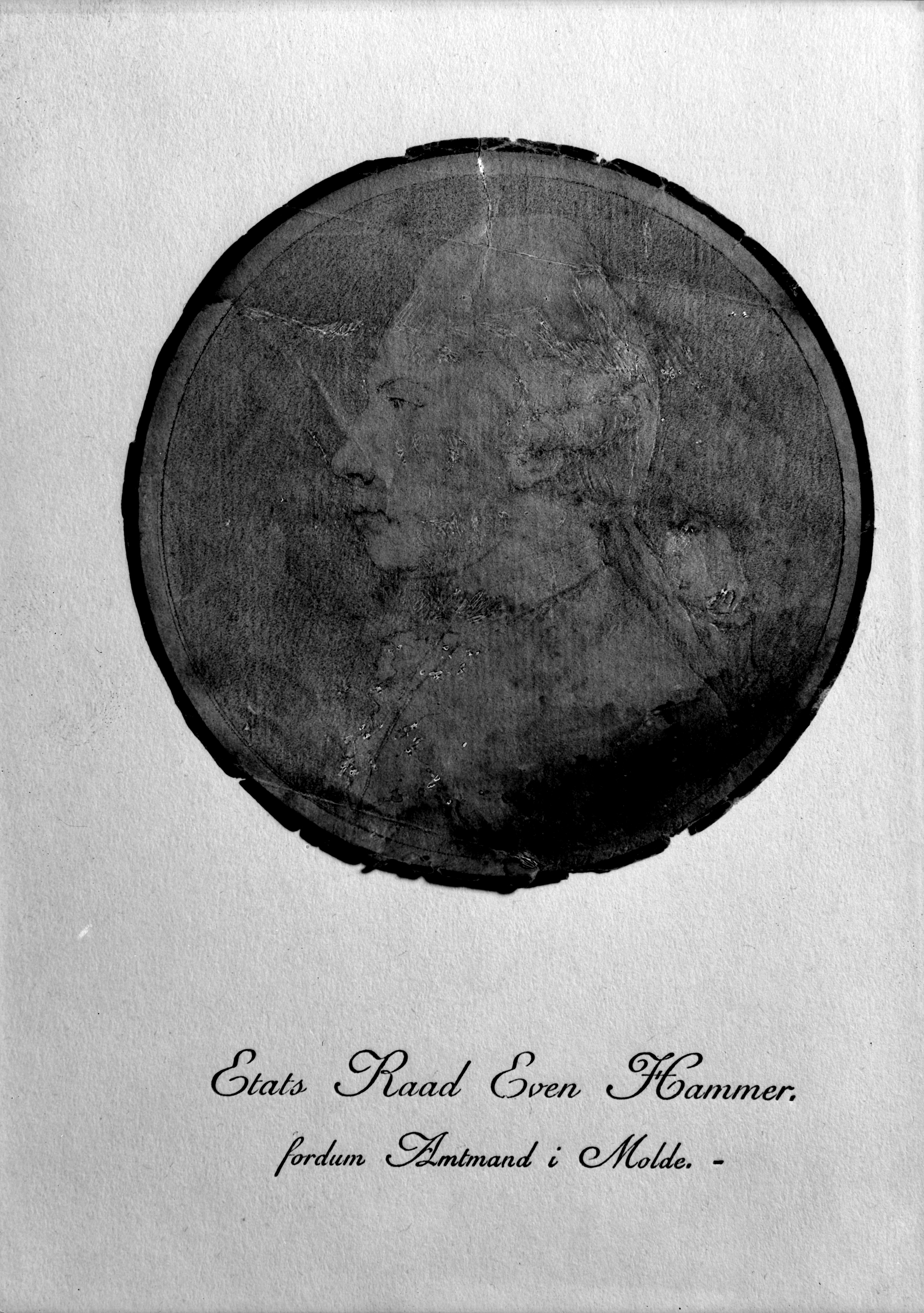
Even Hammer, amtmann (county director) in Molde, Norway. He lived 1732 to 1800.

Even Hammer (1 July 1732 – 22 February 1800) was a Norwegian civil servant.

He was born in Ringsaker in Hedmark county. He was the son of parish priest Ole Hannibalsen Hammer, who was vicar at Nes Church. In 1752, he became a student at the Christiania Cathedral School, where he later was a teacher from 1756 to 1768. He entered the University of Copenhagen in 1752. He took his Magister degree in 1758. In 1768 he traveled abroad and studied at the universities of Oxford, Cambridge, Leiden, Göttingen, and Paris. He served as County Governor of Romsdals amt from 1773 until his death in 1800. In 1777 he received the title of Court of Justice (Justisråd) and in 1781 he was made Councillor of State (Etatsråd).

Political offices
Preceded by Niels Krog Collin	County Governor of Romsdals Amt; 1773–1800	Succeeded by Ole Hannibal Sommerfelt
