= Polmak =

Polmak (Norwegian); Buolbmát (Northern Sami); Pulmanki (Kven)
- Village
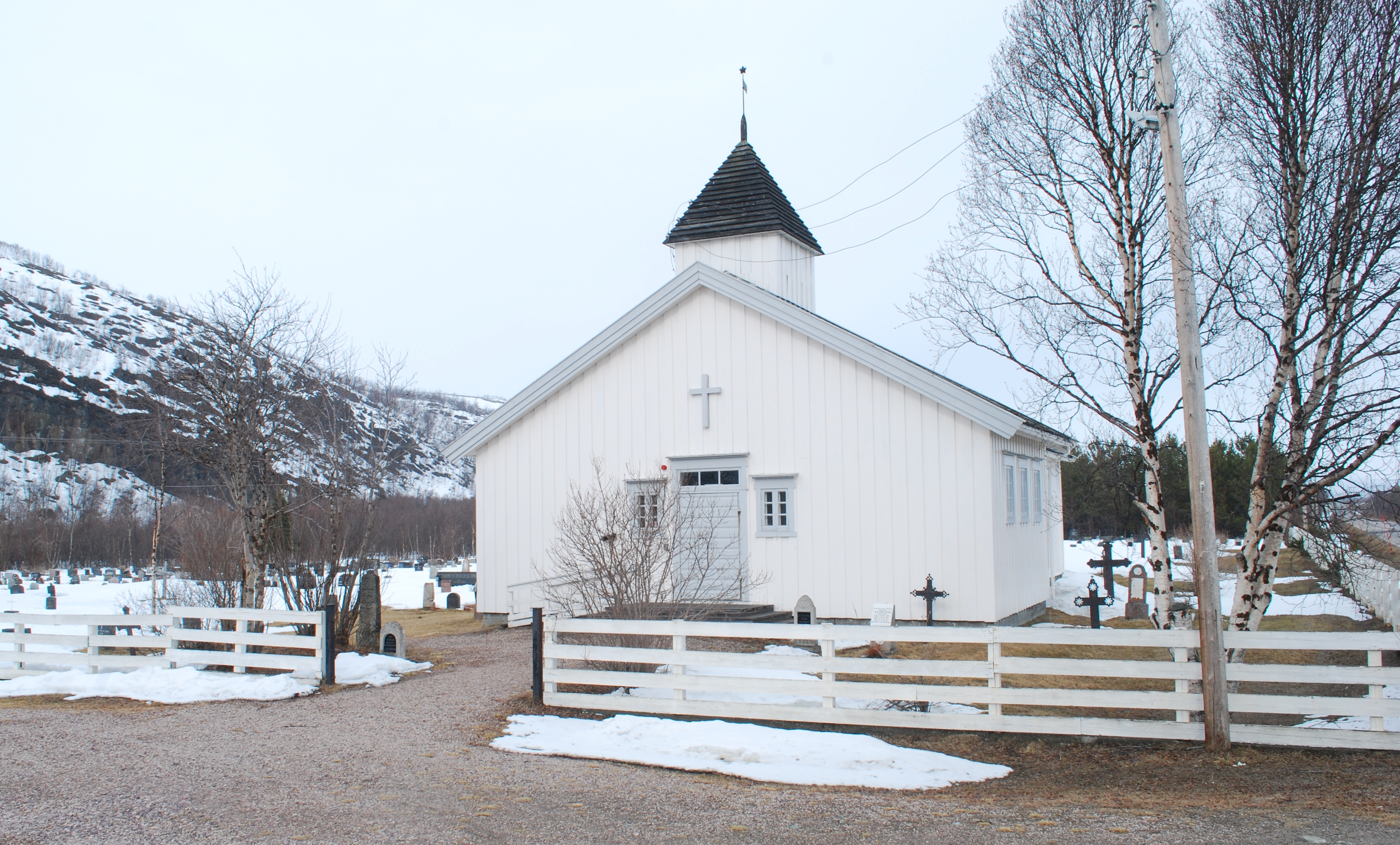
- View of the village church
- Interactive map of: Polmak (Norwegian); Buolbmát (Northern Sami); Pulmanki (Kven)
- Location within Finnmark Location within Norway
- Coordinates: 70.0708°N 28.0075°E
- Country: Norway
- Region: Northern Norway
- County: Troms
- District: Øst-Finnmark
- Municipality: Tana Municipality
- Elevation: 19 m (62 ft)
- Time zone: UTC+01:00 (CET)
  - Summer (DST): UTC+02:00 (CEST)
- Post Code: 9845 Tana

Polmak (Norwegian), Buolbmát (Northern Sami), or Pulmanki (Kven) is a village in Tana Municipality in Finnmark county in Norway. The village is located on the south bank of the river Tana, just east of the border with Finland (and the northernmost point of Finland). The village is the site of the Polmak Church.

The village was the administrative centre of the old municipality of Polmak which existed from 1903 until its dissolution in 1964.

Polmak is situated in the Eastern Finnmark dialect area of Northern Sami, where the language features distinct phonological traits such as a three-way vowel contrast between /æ/, /a/, and /ɑ/ (with /ɑ/ for stressed ⟨a⟩ and /a/ or /æ/ for ⟨á⟩), lengthening of stressed vowels before quantity 1 or 2 consonants, and shortening of quantity 3 consonants, making gradation primarily a matter of vowel length rather than consonant length. These Eastern Finnmark varieties also exhibit umlaut (fronting of vowels before a following front vowel) and lenition of intervocalic /b/ to /v/ and /ɡ/ to /ɣ/ or /j/. The local Kven dialect, Pulmanki, reflects Finnish influences typical of the Meänkieli continuum in the Torne Valley region.

== Name ==
The name is a Norwegian version of the Northern Sami form of the name, Buolbmát. The meaning is unknown.
