= Lauritz Weidemann =

Norwegian politician

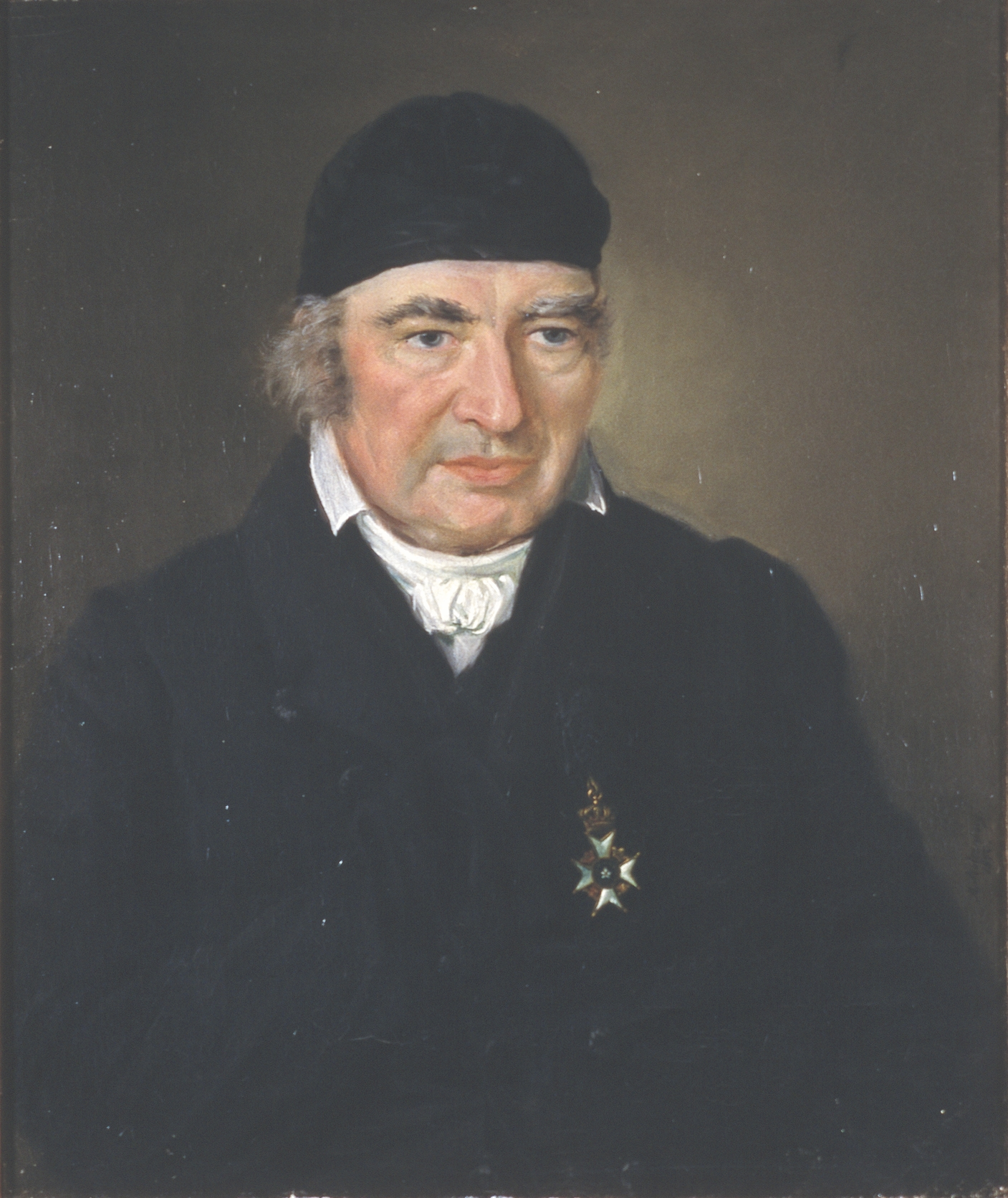
- Born: 27 November 1775; Østre Toten, Norway
- Died: 1 August 1856 (aged 80); Oppland, Norway
- Education: University of Copenhagen
- Occupations: Judge, civil servant and politician
- Known for: Member of the Norwegian Constituent Assembly in 1814
- Spouse: Ditlevine Marie Qvist (1774- 1866)
- Children: David Christopher Weidemann (1800- 1881); Fredrik Sommerfeldt Weidemann (1803-1875)
- Parent(s): Lars Weidemann (1742–1826); Maria Sommerfeldt (1754–1823)
- Relatives: Sophus Weidemann (1836–1894)

Lauritz Weidemann (27 November 1775 – 1 August 1856) was a Norwegian judge, civil servant and politician. He served as county governor for almost 35 years, participated at the Norwegian Constituent Assembly in 1814, and was a member of the Parliament of Norway for several periods.

== Personal life ==
Weidemann was born in Sukkestad (in what is now Østre Toten Municipality) as the son of bailiff Lars Weidemann (1742–1826) and Maria Sommerfeldt (1754–1823). He was married to Ditlevine Marie Quist from 1797. Among his uncles were Christian Sommerfeldt and Ole Hannibal Sommerfeldt, both topographers and county governors. He was himself an uncle of ship constructor Hakon Adelsteen Sommerfeldt and psychiatrist Herman Wedel Major, first cousin of priest and botanist Søren Christian Sommerfeldt and grandfather of industrialist Sophus Weidemann. He died in Toten in 1856.

== Career ==
Weidemann enrolled as a student at the University of Copenhagen in 1790, and graduated as cand.jur. in 1793. He was appointed stipendiary magistrate of the district of Søndre Sunnmøre in 1798, and stipendiary magistrate of the district of Toten from 1802. He represented Kristians amt at the Norwegian Constituent Assembly at Eidsvoll in 1814. In 1815 he published three small political proposals, one regarding the Supreme Court, one on surveying of farm land, and one on finance. He served as County Governor of Hedmark from 1817 to 1821, and as County Governor of Kristians amt from 1821 to 1851.

He was elected to the Parliament of Norway in 1814. From 1815 to 1816 he served as President of the Odelsting. He was elected to the Parliament in 1827, when he was President of the Storting, in 1828, 1836 (President of the Lagting) and in 1839.

He was decorated Commander of the Royal Norwegian Order of St. Olav in 1851, Commander of the Order of Vasa, and Knight of the Order of the Polar Star.

Weidemann was married in 1797 to Ditlevine Marie Qvist (1774- 1866). They had ten children. He was the grandfather of Sophus Weidemann (1836–1894).

Civic offices
Preceded by Claus Bendeke	County Governor of Hedmark; 1817–1821	Succeeded by Frederik Heidmann
Preceded by Ole Hannibal Sommerfeldt	County Governor of Oppland; 1821–1851	Succeeded by Hans Tostrup
