= Martin Andreas Unmack =

Norwegian civil servant and politician

Governor of Finnmarkens amt
- In office 1800–1806
- Preceded by: Ole Hannibal Sommerfeldt
- Succeeded by: Hilmar Meincke Krohg

Personal details
- Born: 1753 Norway
- Died: 1806 (aged 52–53) Norway
- Citizenship: Norway
- Profession: Politician

Martin Andreas Unmack (c. 1753–1806) was a Norwegian civil servant and politician. He served as the County Governor of Finnmarkens amt from 1800 until his death in 1806.

Government offices
Preceded by Ole Hannibal Sommerfeldt	County Governor of Finnmarkens amt 1800–1806	Succeeded by Hilmar Meincke Krohg
