= Varangerbotn =

Varangerbotn (Norwegian); Vuonnabahta (Northern Sami)
- Village
- Interactive map of: Varangerbotn (Norwegian); Vuonnabahta (Northern Sami)
- Location within Finnmark Location within Norway
- Coordinates: 70°10′21″N 28°33′21″E
- Country: Norway
- Region: Northern Norway
- County: Finnmark
- District: Øst-Finnmark
- Municipality: Nesseby
- Elevation: 8 m (26 ft)
- Time zone: UTC+01:00 (CET)
  - Summer (DST): UTC+02:00 (CEST)
- Post Code: 9840 Varangerbotn

Varangerbotn (Norwegian) or Vuonnabahta (Northern Sami) is the administrative centre of Nesseby Municipality, Finnmark county, Norway. It is located at the innermost part of the large Varangerfjorden. The village is located at the intersection of the European route E6 and European route E75 highways. The villages of Karlebotn and Nesseby lie a short distance to the south and east (respectively) from Varangerbotn.

The band The BlackSheeps and previous lead vocalist Agnete Johnsen comes from Varangerbotn. The Varanger Sami Museum is located in the village and it shows the cultural history of the Sami people in the Varanger region.
