= Nesseby (village) =

Unjárga (Northern Sami); Nesseby (Norwegian); Uuniemi (Kven)
- Village
- Interactive map of: Unjárga (Northern Sami); Nesseby (Norwegian); Uuniemi (Kven)
- Location within Finnmark Location within Norway
- Coordinates: 70°09′07″N 28°51′54″E
- Country: Norway
- Region: Northern Norway
- County: Finnmark
- District: Øst-Finnmark
- Municipality: Nesseby
- Elevation: 15 m (49 ft)
- Time zone: UTC+01:00 (CET)
  - Summer (DST): UTC+02:00 (CEST)
- Post Code: 9840 Varangerbotn

Nesseby (Norwegian), Unjárga (Northern Sami), or Uuniemi (Kven) is a small village in Nesseby Municipality in Finnmark county, Norway. The village is located on the southern coast of the Varanger Peninsula, near the inner part of the Varangerfjorden. The European route E75 highway runs through the village on its way from Varangerbotn to Vadsø. Nesseby Church lies on a small peninsula on the coast of the village. The village (and municipality) is bilingual and has two official names: Nesseby (Norwegian) and Unjárga (Northern Sami).
