= The BlackSheeps =

Norwegian rock band

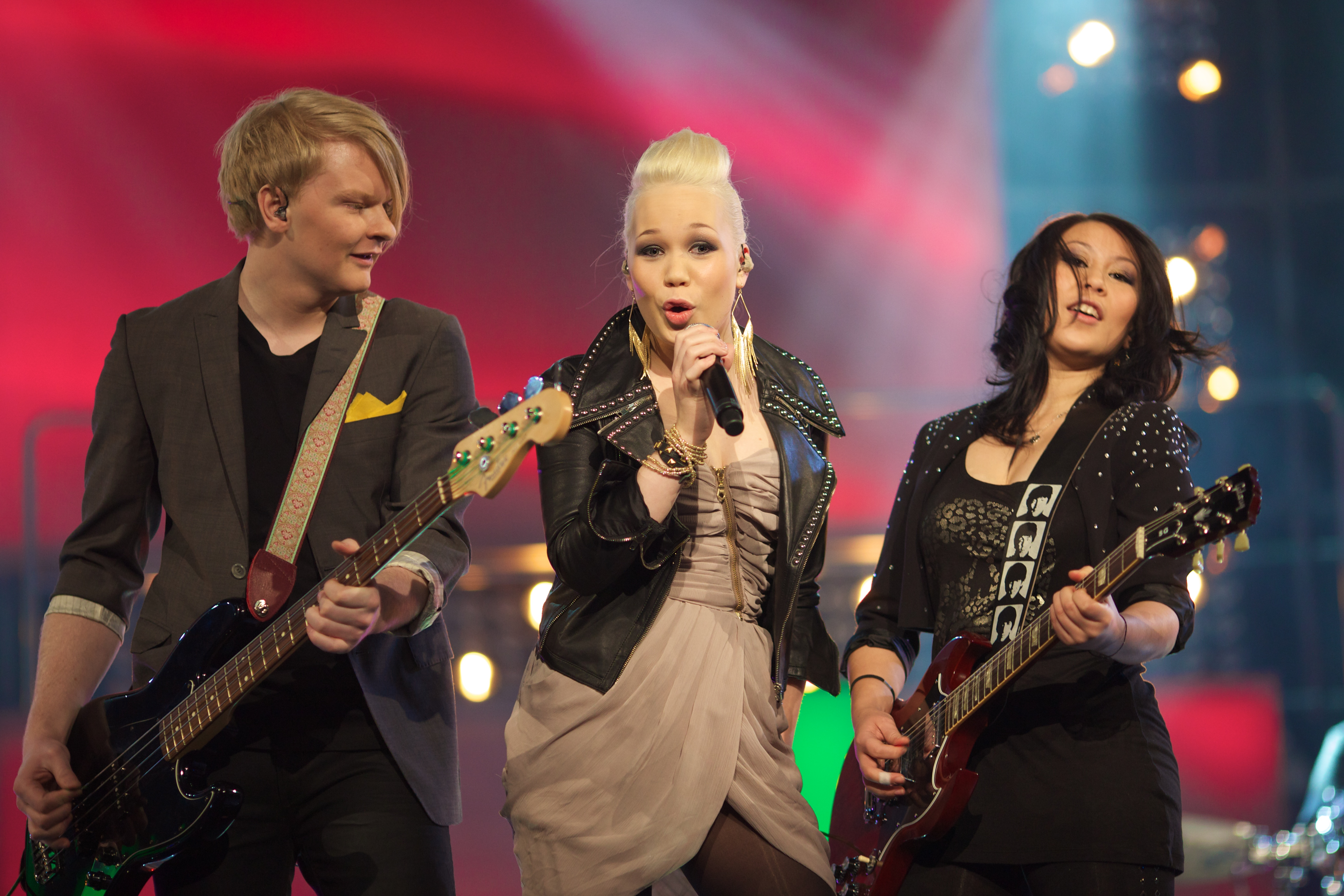
- Nikolaj Nordbakk Gloppen, Emelie Nilsen and Agnete Kristin Johnsen at MGP 2011

Background information
- Origin: Nesseby, Norway
- Genres: Pop, punk, rock
- Years active: 2008–2011
- Labels: MBN
- Members: Agnete Johnsen; Emelie Nilsen; Nikolaj Gloppen; Simon Stenvoll
- Past members: Alexander Touryguin; Viktoria Eriksen
- Website: www.myspace.com/theblacksheepsss

The BlackSheeps was a Norwegian Sami band from Nesseby Municipality in Finnmark county. Their breakthrough came following their participation in the MGP jr, a song contest for children organised by Norwegian state broadcaster NRK. Having won MGP jr 2008 with the song Oro jaska, beana (Be Quiet, Dog) the group went on to represent Norway in the MGP Nordic 2008. They also won this competition after receiving more than half the votes. In 2011, the band was the subject of a legal dispute over the dismissal of two band members, unpaid royalties, and the right to use the band name. However, it was ruled that the band still holds the right to the name, and former band members Alexander Touryguin and Viktoria Eriksen are not owed any money.

== Career ==
The group was formed in 2008 by singer Agnete Johnsen, guitarist Emelie Nilsen, bassist Alexander Touryguin, and drummer Viktoria Eriksen. On 2 June 2007 the group participated in Melodi Grand Prix Junior 2008 with their song "Oro, Jaska, Beana." The group won the contest and went on to represent Norway in MGP Nordic 2008. On 29 November 2008 the group won MGP Nordic 2008 after receiving more than half of the votes. "Oro, Jaska, Beana" reached #1 in the Norwegian Singles Charts afterwards. In June 2010, Touryguin and Eriksen were dismissed from the band and were replaced by Nikolaj Gloppen and Simon Stenvoll Pedersen respectively. In 2011, the band participated in Melodi Grand Prix 2011, with their song "Dance Tonight." They ultimately came 2nd place, losing out to the song "Haba Haba" by Stella Mwangi. The band became the subject of a legal dispute over the dismissal of Touryguin and Eriksen, unpaid royalties and the right to use the band name. However, it was ruled that the band still holds the right to the name, and Touryguin and Eriksen are not owed any money.

== Personnel ==
=== Current members ===
- Agnete Johnsen (born 4 July 1994) – Vocals
- Nikolaj Gloppen (born 1992) - Bass
- Simon Stenvoll Pedersen (born 1992) – Drums
- Emelie Nilsen (born 29 March 1993) – Guitar

=== Former members ===
- Alexander Touryguin (born 16 October 1993) – Bass
- Viktoria Eriksen (born 6 July 1993) – Drums

== Discography ==
=== Albums ===
Title	Details	Peak chart positions
Title	Details	NOR
The Blacksheeps	Released: 2009; Label: MBN; Format: Digital download, CD	4

=== Singles ===
Year	Title	Peak chart positions	Album
Year	Title	NOR	Album
2008	"Oro jaska, beana"	1	The Blacksheeps
2009	"Edwin"	14	The Blacksheeps
2009	"Gold Lion"	—	The Blacksheeps
2009	"No Milk Today"	—	The Blacksheeps
2011	"Dance Tonight"	15	Non-album single

== Trivia ==
In a live chat on the website of Norwegian newspaper VG, the group was confronted with the grammatical incorrectness of their name. The group said they were aware that “sheeps” was not the correct plural form but contended that this did not matter. “Many bands have spelling mistakes in their name, such as The Beatles. Remember it’s just a band name, so anything works,” was their reply.

== Official website ==
http://www.blacksheeps.no/
