= Sophus Weidemann =

Norwegian engineer and industrialist

- Born: 31 December 1836; Oslo, Norway
- Died: 29 March 1894 (aged 57); Trondheim, Norway
- Occupations: Engineer and industrialist
- Relatives: Lauritz Weidemann (grandfather)

Sophus Weidemann (31 December 1836 – 29 March 1894) was a Norwegian engineer and industrialist who contributed to the development of the shipping industry in Norway.

== Biography ==
Weidemann was born in Christiania (now Oslo), Norway. He was the son of Frederik Sommerfeldt Weidemann (1803–75) and Nathalia Adelaide Major (1808–51). He was the grandson of judge Lauritz Weidemann (1775–1856) and among his uncles was psychiatrist Herman Wedel Major (1814–1854).

Weidemann received an education in engineering at the Naval Academy (Sjøkrigsskolen) at Horten. In 1856, Weidemann was employed as a technical draftsman at Bergen Mekaniske Verksted. From 1864 he was manager of the workshop Fabrikken ved Nidelven in Trondheim, the later ship building company Trondhjems mekaniske Værksted. Weidemann resigned his managerial position at Fabrikken in 1871. He then opened his own engineering office and became a technical consultant for Trondheim based steamship company, Det Nordenfjeldske Dampskibsselskab until 1875.

Weidemann was elected to Trondheim City Council in 1883 In 1884, he bought Rosenborg farm together with lawyer Karl Ludvig Bugge. The partners sold the parcel Bakkestranden to the municipality, while the rest of the area was divided up into residential plots and became the basis for the Trondheim neighborhood of Rosenborg. Weidemann retained the Rosenborg farm site where he and his wife lived the rest of their lives. He died at Trondheim in 1894.
