= Ole Hannibal Sommerfelt =

Norwegian politician

Ole Hannibal Sommerfelt (3 March 1753 – 6 April 1821) was a Norwegian jurist, civil servant and topographer. He was active in Denmark-Norway.

== Personal life ==
He was born at Sukkestad in Toten (in the present-day Østre Toten Municipality) as a son of district stipendiary magistrate and chancellor councillor David Christian Sommerfelt (1717–1773) and Benedicte "Bente" Christine Hoff. His grandfather Christian Sommerfelt was also district stipendiary magistrate. His great-grandfather and uncle were both named Hans, and became priests. The latter worked in Denmark and became ancestor for a Danish family line. Ole Hannibal Sommerfeldt became ancestor of a Norwegian branch of Sommerfeldts, and so did his brother Christian. Through his sister Maria he was an uncle of Lauritz Weidemann, and through his brother an uncle of Søren Christian Sommerfelt.

Ole Hannibal Sommerfeldt was married twice. First he married merchant's daughter Thrine Karine Bøe (1756–1792) in July 1780 in Gausdal. After her death, in July 1801 in Kvernes he married dean's daughter Anne Catharina Lemvig Aussig (née Bull, 1759–1848). He changed his name from Sommerfeldt to Sommerfelt before 1800. He was a grandfather of Hakon Adelsteen Sommerfeldt and great-great-grandfather of Alf and Wilhelm Preus Sommerfeldt.

== Career ==
Sommerfeldt grew up at Sukkestad, enrolled at the University of Copenhagen in 1771 and graduated in law in 1773. He then became a deputy judge in Toten, serving under his father, and when his father died, he became acting district stipendiary magistrate. From 1776 to 1883 he held the same position in Søndre Gudbrandsdalen. From 1784 he held the title chamber councillor (kammerråd).

From the spring of 1784 he served as bailiff (foged) of Finmarkens Amt. He was also district stipendiary magistrate from 1875 to 1786 and also acting County Governor of Finmarkens Amt while Christen Heiberg was away. From 1787 to 1800 he served as County Governor. He went on as County Governor of Romsdals Amt from 1800 before succeeding his deceased brother as County Governor of Christians Amt in 1811. He resided at the Dal farm in the prestegjeld of Vardal. He retired in 1821 and died in the same year. Sommerfelt was also elected to the first Parliament of Norway in 1814, and served through the one-year term.

As an Enlightenment person, Sommerfeldt was interested in practical agriculture, economy and topography. He was the praeses of Det Romsdalske practiske Landhusholdningsselskab in the early 1800s, and while serving in Christians Amt he advocated the city status for Lillehammer, which was granted in 1827. In Finmarkens Amt he planned the city status for Tromsø (granted 1794) and achieved city status for Vardø and Hammerfest in 1789. He followed a free trade principle and also supported Jens Holmboe's settling project in Målselvdalen. Like his brother, he was also a topographical writer. The journal Topographisk Journal for Norge printed his main topographical work, Kort Beskrivelse over Finmarken, in 1799.

Sommerfelt was decorated as a Knight of the Order of the Dannebrog (1813), the Order of Vasa (1815) and the Order of the Polar Star (1818). He died in April 1821 in Biri and was buried at Vardal Church.

Government offices
Preceded by Christen Heiberg	County Governor of Finnmarkens amt 1787–1800	Succeeded by Martin Andreas Unmack
Preceded by Even Hammer	County Governor of Romsdalens amt 1800–1811	Succeeded by Hilmar Meincke Krohg
Preceded by Christian Sommerfeldt	County Governor of Christians amt 1811–1821	Succeeded by Lauritz Weidemann
