= Nesseby Municipality =

Municipality in Finnmark, Norway

Nesseby Municipality Nesseby kommune Unjárgga gielda
- Municipality
- Næsseby herred (historic name)
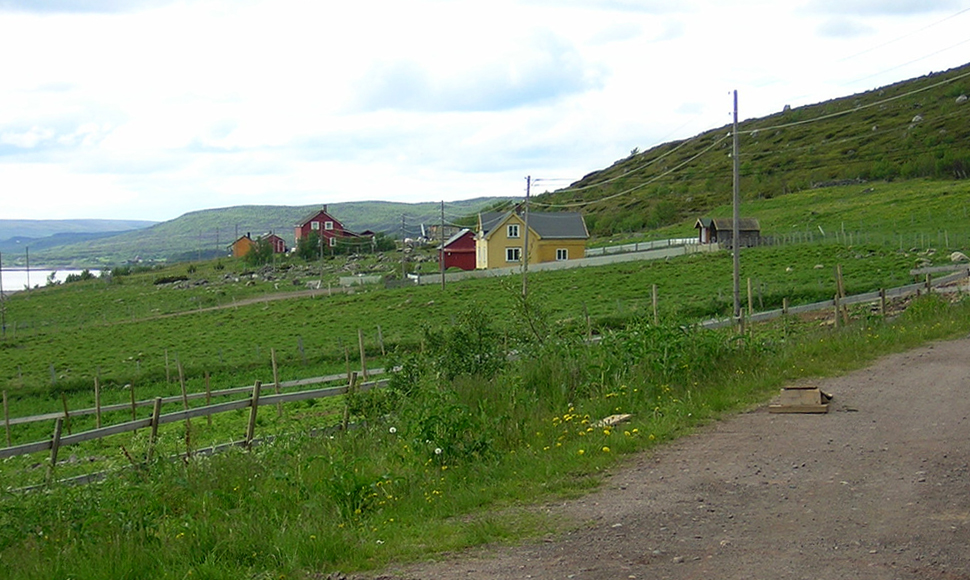
- Abelsborg in Nesseby municipality

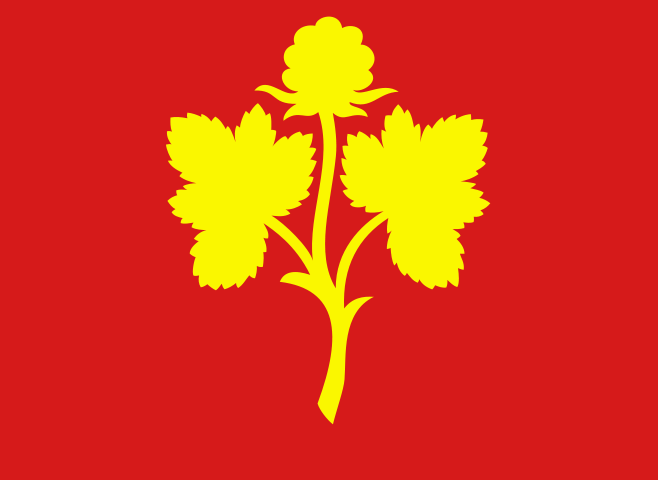
- Flag Coat of arms

- Finnmark within Norway

- Nesseby within Finnmark
- Coordinates: 70°10′24″N 28°33′13″E
- Country: Norway
- County: Finnmark
- District: Øst-Finnmark
- Established: 1839
  - Preceded by: Vadsø landdistrikt
- Administrative centre: Varangerbotn

Government
  - Mayor (2023): Berit Ranveig Nilssen (LL)

Area
  - Total: 1,437.07 km^{2} (554.86 sq mi)
  - Land: 1,365.04 km^{2} (527.04 sq mi)
  - Water: 72.03 km^{2} (27.81 sq mi) 5%
  - Rank: #62 in Norway
- Highest elevation: 520 m (1,710 ft)

Population (2024)
  - Total: 859
  - Rank: #344 in Norway
  - Density: 0.6/km^{2} (1.6/sq mi)
  - Change (10 years): ▼ −6.5%
- Demonym: Nessebyværing

Official languages
  - Norwegian form: Bokmål
  - Sámi form: Northern Sami
- Time zone: UTC+01:00 (CET)
  - Summer (DST): UTC+02:00 (CEST)
- ISO 3166 code: NO-5636
- Website: Official website

Unjárga (Northern Sami) or Nesseby (Norwegian) (also unofficially Uuniemi in Kven and Finnish) is a municipality in Finnmark county, Norway. The administrative centre of the municipality is the village of Varangerbotn. Other villages in Nesseby include Gandvik, Karlebotn, Nesseby, Grasbakken and Nyelv. The European route E06 and European route E75 highways intersect at Varangerbotn in Nesseby.

The 1,437-square-kilometre (555 sq mi) municipality is the 62nd largest by area out of the 357 municipalities in Norway. Nesseby is the 344th most populous municipality in Norway with a population of 859. The municipality's population density is 0.6 inhabitants per square kilometre (1.6/sq mi) and its population has decreased by 6.5% over the previous 10-year period.

In popular culture: The municipality has been the main set of movies, as late as the 2020s.

== Name ==
The municipality (originally the parish) was originally named after the old Næsseby farm since the first Nesseby Church was built there. The first element comes from the word nes which means "headland". The last element is by which means "town". Thus it's the "town on the headland". Historically, the name of the municipality was spelled Næsseby. On 3 November 1917, a royal resolution changed the spelling of the name of the municipality to Nesseby.

In 1989, the municipality formally changed its name to Unjárga-Nesseby. It was the second municipality in Norway to get a Sami name. This name was the old Sami name for the area. The meaning of the first element (u-) in the Sami name is unknown and the last element is njárga which means "headland". In 2005, the name was again changed, such that either Unjárga or Nesseby can be used. The spelling of the Sami language name changes depending on how it is used. It is called Unjárga when it is spelled alone, but it is Unjárgga gielda when using the Sami language equivalent to "Nesseby municipality".

== Coat of arms ==
The coat of arms was granted on 27 June 1986. The official blazon is "Gules, a cloudberry plant Or couped at base" (Norwegian: I rødt en opprett gul molteplante). This means the arms have a red field (background) and the charge is a cloudberry plant (Rubus chamaemorus). The cloudberry plant has a tincture of Or which means it is commonly colored yellow, but if it is made out of metal, then gold is used. Cloudberry plants are commonly found in the municipality and the Finnmark region, growing in marshes and wet fields. The berries are collected and eaten locally as well as commercially exported to other parts of Norway. The berries are at first red, but when ripe they get a golden or orange colour, so the colour combination of yellow and red was used on the arms to represent this.

== History ==
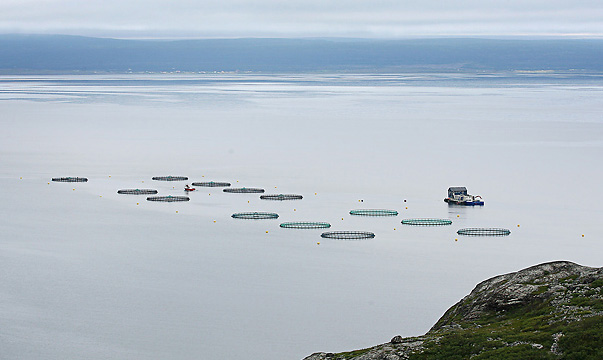
Farming of salmon in Nesseby

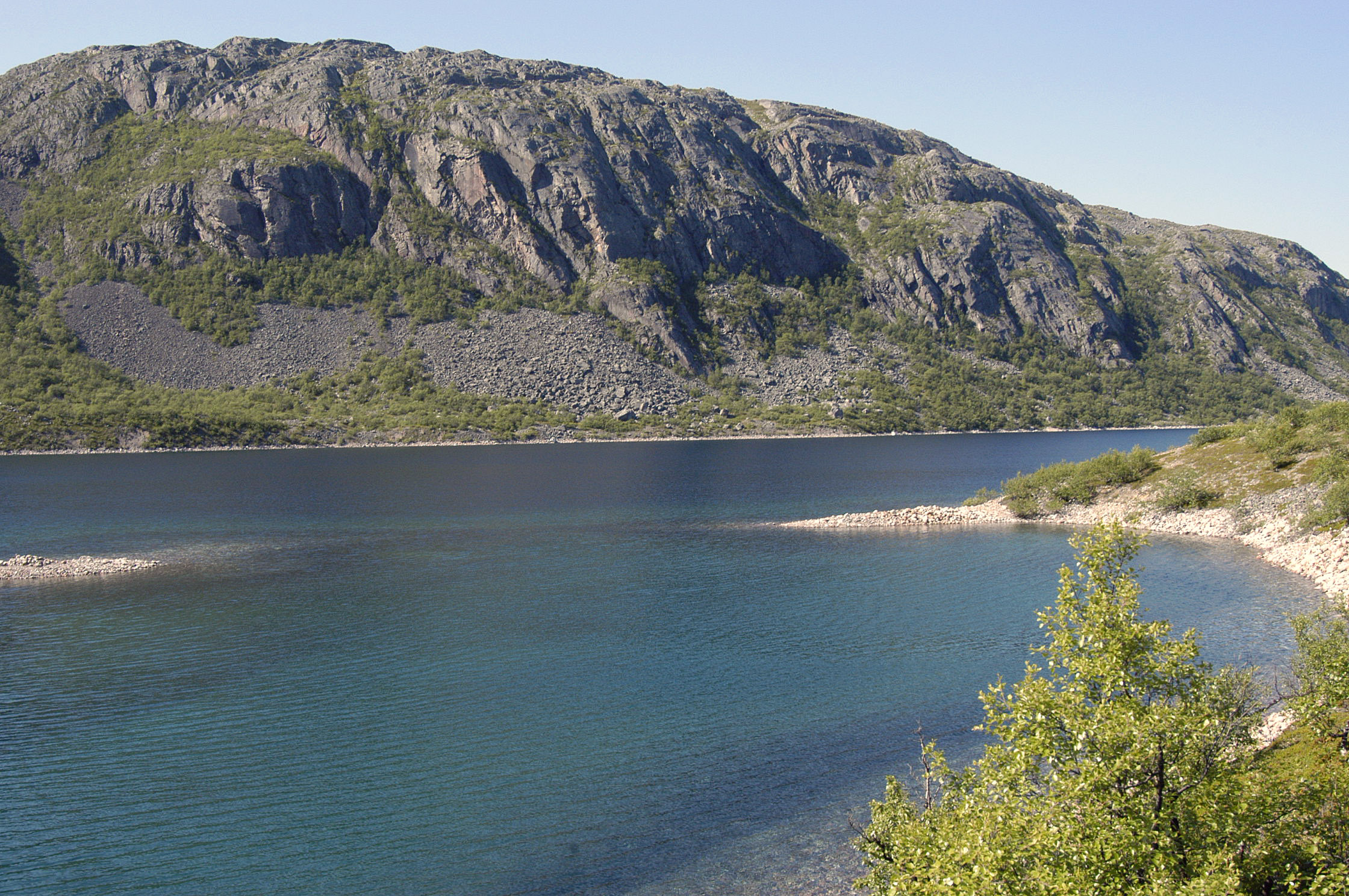
View of the lake Gánddajávri

The most important winter market (during the 17th and 18th century) in Sápmi, was in present-day Nesseby municipality; in 2024, media said that archaeology has pinpointed the market to 1 km West of Karlebotn.

Wild reindeer used to cross the isthmus in prehistoric times until the year 1900, causing extensive human activity throughout the millennia. Therefore, the area is full of archeological finds from different periods.

=== Establishment of a municipality ===
The municipality of Nesseby was originally established in 1839 a year after the formannskapsdistrikt law went into effect. The large Vadsø landdistrikt municipality was divided and the western portion became Nesseby Municipality. Initially, there were 598 residents. This was short-lived, however, since the two were merged back together in 1858. On 1 January 1864, Nesseby Municipality was re-created from the western district of Vadsø landdistrikt. The initial population (this time) was 886. On 1 January 1903, the western part of Nesseby Municipality (population: 450) was separated to form the new Polmak Municipality.

On 1 January 2020, the municipality became part of the newly formed Troms og Finnmark county. Previously, it had been part of the old Finnmark county. On 1 January 2024, the Troms og Finnmark county was divided and the municipality once again became part of Finnmark county.

== Economy ==
In 2013, 26% of jobs of in the municipality were within the health sector and social sector; 8% were within education; there were 373 jobs in the municipality. The hydroelectric power station, Gandvik kraftverk produces [around] 20.1 gigawatt-hours (72 TJ) (as of 2021).

Commercial fish processing has been going on at Kløvnes since 2017.

The innermost marina in the Varanger Fjord (Kløvnes havn near Nesseby Church) is operating at full capacity - 32 vessels; many of those are fishing vessels.

== Geography ==
The municipality is situated on the isthmus between the Varangerfjord and the Tana River at the entrance to the Varanger Peninsula. All the people live in small settlements along the fjord. Varangerhalvøya National Park is partially located in the park. The river Jakobselva partially forms the border between Nesseby Municipality and Vadsø Municipality to the northeast. The highest point in the municipality is the 520-metre (1,710 ft) tall mountain Midthaugen. The mountain Stuorrastivrran is considered to be a sacred mountain, according to the Sami Parliament; It is part of Seida-fjellet, a mountain [or range].

=== Birdlife ===
The municipality of Unjárga-Nesseby is known for its interesting birding localities and is mentioned in several birding guide books. Other than the Varangerford, the main habitat is tundra with areas of bog and marsh. One species that can usually be seen on small ponds during the summer months is the red-necked phalarope.

=== Climate ===
Climate data for Varangerbotn
| Month | Jan | Feb | Mar | Apr | May | Jun | Jul | Aug | Sep | Oct | Nov | Dec | Year |
|---|---|---|---|---|---|---|---|---|---|---|---|---|---|
| Daily mean °C (°F) | −11.9 (10.6) | −11.0 (12.2) | −7.4 (18.7) | −2.3 (27.9) | 3.1 (37.6) | 8.6 (47.5) | 12.2 (54.0) | 10.5 (50.9) | 6.1 (43.0) | 0.3 (32.5) | −5.7 (21.7) | −9.9 (14.2) | −0.6 (30.9) |
| Average precipitation mm (inches) | 27 (1.1) | 22 (0.9) | 21 (0.8) | 21 (0.8) | 24 (0.9) | 37 (1.5) | 55 (2.2) | 53 (2.1) | 44 (1.7) | 41 (1.6) | 34 (1.3) | 31 (1.2) | 410 (16.1) |
Source: Norwegian Meteorological Institute

== Government ==
Nesseby Municipality is responsible for primary education (through 10th grade), outpatient health services, senior citizen services, welfare and other social services, zoning, economic development, and municipal roads and utilities. The municipality is governed by a municipal council of directly elected representatives. The mayor is indirectly elected by a vote of the municipal council. The municipality is under the jurisdiction of the Indre og Østre Finnmark District Court and the Hålogaland Court of Appeal.

=== Municipal council ===
The municipal council (Kommunestyre) of Nesseby Municipality is made up of 15 representatives that are elected to four year terms. The tables below show the current and historical composition of the council by political party.

Unjárga Nesseby kommunestyre 2023–2027
| Party name (in Norwegian) | Number of representatives |
|---|---|
| Labour Party (Arbeiderpartiet) | 7 |
| Socialist Left Party (Sosialistisk Venstreparti) | 1 |
| Cross-Party List (Tverrpolitisk liste) | 7 |
| Total number of members: | 15 |

Past councils

Unjárga Nesseby kommunestyre 2019–2023
| Party name (in Norwegian) | Number of representatives |
|---|---|
| Labour Party (Arbeiderpartiet) | 7 |
| Conservative Party (Høyre) | 1 |
| Sámi People's Party (Samefolkets Parti) | 2 |
| Centre Party (Senterpartiet) | 3 |
| Socialist Left Party (Sosialistisk Venstreparti) | 1 |
| Cross-Party List (Tverrpolitisk liste) | 1 |
| Total number of members: | 15 |

Unjárga Nesseby kommunestyre 2015–2019
| Party name (in Norwegian) | Number of representatives |
|---|---|
| Labour Party (Arbeiderpartiet) | 7 |
| Sámi People's Party (Samefolkets Parti) | 3 |
| Socialist Left Party (Sosialistisk Venstreparti) | 2 |
| Cross-Party List (Tverrpolitisk liste) | 3 |
| Total number of members: | 15 |

Unjárga Nesseby kommunestyre 2011–2015
| Party name (in Norwegian) | Number of representatives |
|---|---|
| Labour Party (Arbeiderpartiet) | 6 |
| Progress Party (Fremskrittspartiet) | 2 |
| Conservative Party (Høyre) | 2 |
| Sámi People's Party (Samefolkets Parti) | 2 |
| Socialist Left Party (Sosialistisk Venstreparti) | 2 |
| Cross-Party List (Tverrpolitisk liste) | 1 |
| Total number of members: | 15 |

Unjárga Nesseby kommunestyre 2007–2011
| Party name (in Norwegian) | Number of representatives |
|---|---|
| Labour Party (Arbeiderpartiet) | 6 |
| Progress Party (Fremskrittspartiet) | 3 |
| Conservative Party (Høyre) | 1 |
| Sámi People's Party (Samefolkets Parti) | 2 |
| Cross-Party List (Tverrpolitisk liste) | 3 |
| Total number of members: | 15 |

Unjárga-Nesseby kommunestyre 2003–2007
| Party name (in Norwegian) | Number of representatives |
|---|---|
| Labour Party (Arbeiderpartiet) | 6 |
| Progress Party (Fremskrittspartiet) | 3 |
| Conservative Party (Høyre) | 2 |
| Sámi People's Party (Samefolkets Parti) | 3 |
| Cross-Party List (Tverrpolitisk liste) | 3 |
| Total number of members: | 17 |

Unjárga-Nesseby kommunestyre 1999–2003
| Party name (in Norwegian) | Number of representatives |
|---|---|
| Labour Party (Arbeiderpartiet) | 6 |
| Conservative Party (Høyre) | 2 |
| Sámi People's Party (Samefolkets Parti) | 2 |
| Cross-Party List (Tverrpolitisk liste) | 5 |
| Free voters (Frie velgere) | 2 |
| Total number of members: | 17 |

Unjárga-Nesseby kommunestyre 1995–1999
| Party name (in Norwegian) | Number of representatives |
|---|---|
| Labour Party (Arbeiderpartiet) | 7 |
| Conservative Party (Høyre) | 2 |
| Sámi List (Samefolkets liste) | 3 |
| Cross-Party List (Tverrpolitisk liste) | 5 |
| Total number of members: | 17 |

Unjárga-Nesseby kommunestyre 1991–1995
| Party name (in Norwegian) | Number of representatives |
|---|---|
| Labour Party (Arbeiderpartiet) | 6 |
| Conservative Party (Høyre) | 3 |
| Sámi List (Samefolkets liste) | 2 |
| Cross-Party List (Tverrpolitisk liste) | 6 |
| Total number of members: | 17 |

Unjárga-Nesseby kommunestyre 1987–1991
| Party name (in Norwegian) | Number of representatives |
|---|---|
| Labour Party (Arbeiderpartiet) | 8 |
| Conservative Party (Høyre) | 1 |
| Common List for Cross-Party Group and Centre Party (Fellesliste for tverrpolitiskgruppe og Senterpartiet) | 5 |
| Sámi List (Samefolkets liste) | 3 |
| Total number of members: | 17 |

Nesseby kommunestyre 1983–1987
| Party name (in Norwegian) | Number of representatives |
|---|---|
| Labour Party (Arbeiderpartiet) | 9 |
| Conservative Party (Høyre) | 1 |
| Centre Party (Senterpartiet) | 2 |
| Sámi List (Samefolkets liste) | 3 |
| Cross-Party list for fishermen, farmers, and others (Tverrpolitisk liste for fiskere, småbrukere og andre yrkesgruppe) | 2 |
| Total number of members: | 17 |

Nesseby kommunestyre 1979–1983
| Party name (in Norwegian) | Number of representatives |
|---|---|
| Labour Party (Arbeiderpartiet) | 7 |
| Conservative Party (Høyre) | 4 |
| Centre Party (Senterpartiet) | 3 |
| Sámi List (Samefolkets liste) | 3 |
| Total number of members: | 17 |

Nesseby kommunestyre 1975–1979
| Party name (in Norwegian) | Number of representatives |
|---|---|
| Labour Party (Arbeiderpartiet) | 7 |
| Conservative Party (Høyre) | 2 |
| Centre Party (Senterpartiet) | 2 |
| Local List(s) (Lokale lister) | 2 |
| Total number of members: | 13 |

Nesseby kommunestyre 1971–1975
| Party name (in Norwegian) | Number of representatives |
|---|---|
| Labour Party (Arbeiderpartiet) | 7 |
| Conservative Party (Høyre) | 3 |
| Centre Party (Senterpartiet) | 2 |
| Local List(s) (Lokale lister) | 1 |
| Total number of members: | 13 |

Nesseby kommunestyre 1967–1971
| Party name (in Norwegian) | Number of representatives |
|---|---|
| Labour Party (Arbeiderpartiet) | 7 |
| Conservative Party (Høyre) | 4 |
| List of workers, fishermen, and small farmholders (Arbeidere, fiskere, småbrukere liste) | 2 |
| Total number of members: | 13 |

Nesseby kommunestyre 1963–1967
| Party name (in Norwegian) | Number of representatives |
|---|---|
| Labour Party (Arbeiderpartiet) | 8 |
| Conservative Party (Høyre) | 2 |
| Christian Democratic Party (Kristelig Folkeparti) | 1 |
| List of workers, fishermen, and small farmholders (Arbeidere, fiskere, småbrukere liste) | 2 |
| Total number of members: | 13 |

Nesseby herredsstyre 1959–1963
| Party name (in Norwegian) | Number of representatives |
|---|---|
| Labour Party (Arbeiderpartiet) | 4 |
| Conservative Party (Høyre) | 3 |
| Communist Party (Kommunistiske Parti) | 1 |
| List of workers, fishermen, and small farmholders (Arbeidere, fiskere, småbrukere liste) | 4 |
| Local List(s) (Lokale lister) | 1 |
| Total number of members: | 13 |

Nesseby herredsstyre 1955–1959
| Party name (in Norwegian) | Number of representatives |
|---|---|
| Labour Party (Arbeiderpartiet) | 7 |
| Conservative Party (Høyre) | 2 |
| Communist Party (Kommunistiske Parti) | 1 |
| List of workers, fishermen, and small farmholders (Arbeidere, fiskere, småbrukere liste) | 3 |
| Total number of members: | 13 |

Nesseby herredsstyre 1951–1955
| Party name (in Norwegian) | Number of representatives |
|---|---|
| Labour Party (Arbeiderpartiet) | 6 |
| Conservative Party (Høyre) | 2 |
| Communist Party (Kommunistiske Parti) | 1 |
| List of workers, fishermen, and small farmholders (Arbeidere, fiskere, småbrukere liste) | 3 |
| Total number of members: | 12 |

Nesseby herredsstyre 1947–1951
| Party name (in Norwegian) | Number of representatives |
|---|---|
| Labour Party (Arbeiderpartiet) | 4 |
| Communist Party (Kommunistiske Parti) | 2 |
| List of workers, fishermen, and small farmholders (Arbeidere, fiskere, småbrukere liste) | 6 |
| Total number of members: | 12 |

Nesseby herredsstyre 1945–1947
| Party name (in Norwegian) | Number of representatives |
|---|---|
| Labour Party (Arbeiderpartiet) | 5 |
| List of workers, fishermen, and small farmholders (Arbeidere, fiskere, småbrukere liste) | 7 |
| Total number of members: | 12 |

Nesseby herredsstyre 1937–1941*
| Party name (in Norwegian) | Number of representatives |
|---|---|
| Labour Party (Arbeiderpartiet) | 6 |
| List of workers, fishermen, and small farmholders (Arbeidere, fiskere, småbrukere liste) | 2 |
| Joint List(s) of Non-Socialist Parties (Borgerlige Felleslister) | 2 |
| Local List(s) (Lokale lister) | 2 |
| Total number of members: | 12 |
Note: Due to the German occupation of Norway during World War II, no elections were held for new municipal councils until after the war ended in 1945.

=== Mayors ===
The mayor (Norwegian: ordfører) of Nesseby Municipality is the political leader of the municipality and the chairperson of the municipal council. The mayor since 2023 has been Berit Ranveig Nilssen (LL)

Past mayors
- 1846–1847: Jørris Schelderup Hansen
- 1848–1849: Johan Christian Astrup
- 1849–1850: Jørris Schelderup Hansen
- 1850–1853: Christian Sommerfelt
- 1854–1854: Carl Johan Scanche
- 1855–1855: Christian Andreassen
- 1855–1856: Christian Sommerfelt
- 1856–1857: Christian Andreassen
- 1857–1859: Carl Johan Scanche
- 1859–1860: Andreas Nordvi
- 1863–1863: Hieronymus Heyerdahl
- 1865–1876: Otto Andreas Pleym, Sr.
- 1877–1879: Olaf Olafsen Lassen
- 1880–1880: Otto Andreas Pleym, Sr.
- 1881–1898: Johan Bjørvik Jacobsen
- 1899–1904: Otto Andreas Pleym, Jr.
- 1905–1913: Anton Olsen Hoem
- 1914–1915: Isak Saba (Ap)
- 1916–1925: Kristian Martin Andersen
- 1926–1931: Erling Hoem
- 1932–1934: Bernhard Haldorsen Skauge
- 1935–1937: Herman Anton Losvik
- 1938–1940: Julius Herman Endresen
- 1944–1945: Sverre Oskar Raddum
- 1945–1945: Julius Herman Endresen
- 1946–1950: Andreas Gustav Adolf Berg
- 1951–1954: Mathis Johan Saba
- 1954–1954: Julius Leonhard Johansen
- 1955–1955: Per Nilsen Balk
- 1956–1959: Truls Holm
- 1959–1959: Johan Petter Store
- 1960–1961: Einar Leonhard Samuelsen
- 1962–1967: Per Nilsen Balk
- 1968–1971: Otto Bjørvik Pleym (H)
- 1972–1975: Johan Per Erik Store (Ap)
- 1976–1979: Einar Rudolf Johansen (Ap)
- 1980–1983: Øystein Nilsen (Sp)
- 1984–1987: Einar Rudolf Johansen (Ap)
- 1988–1989: Thore Andreas Sundfær (Ap)
- 1990–1991: Mari-Ann Nilssen (H)
- 1991–1999: Jarle-Wilfred Andreassen (Ap)
- 1999–2003: Thore Andreas Sundfær (Ap)
- 2003–2007: Ann-Jorid Henriksen (Ap)
- 2007–2011: Inger Katrine Juuso (Ap)
- 2011–2023: Knut Inge Store (Ap)

== Culture ==
The building that is likely the oldest, is at [Nesseby graveyard] Nesseby kirkegård; it is [a small hut made of timber] tømmerstue, and it is probably from when the first chapel was built (year 1718) at Angsnes - further inside the fjord, according to media.

Grasbakken (settlement) has its landmark building; It has the appearance of a small church; It was built as a Pentecostal church, but later sold to an association of community members of Grasbakken.

=== Sami culture ===
Most inhabitants are of Sami origin, and today Sami is being taught as the first language in schools. The municipality has its own Sami costume.

A survey conducted on behalf of the Sami Language Council in the year 2000 showed that 75 percent of the population are Sami speakers.

The Norwegian Sami Parliament's department of culture and environment is located in Unjárga-Nesseby. The Várjjat Sámi Museum is located in the municipality. The museum is about the sea-sami culture. Unjárga-Nesseby is also the birthplace of Isak Saba the first Sami to be elected into the Norwegian Parliament.

'A municipality of Coastal Sami', or sjøsamekommune, is a description used by media and the government of Norway.

The popular teen-age pop-band The Blacksheeps come from Nesseby.

=== Churches ===
The Church of Norway has one parish (sokn) within Nesseby Municipality. It is part of the Indre Finnmark prosti (deanery) in the Diocese of Nord-Hålogaland.

Churches in Nesseby Municipality
| Parish (sokn) | Church name | Location of the church | Year built |
|---|---|---|---|
| Nesseby | Nesseby Church | Nesseby | 1858 |

== Sports ==
Bergebyløpet is a yearly dog sled race between the Bergeby hamlet in Nesseby municipality and [Seida mountain or] Seidafjellet (which straddles Tana and Nesseby municipalities).

== Notable people ==
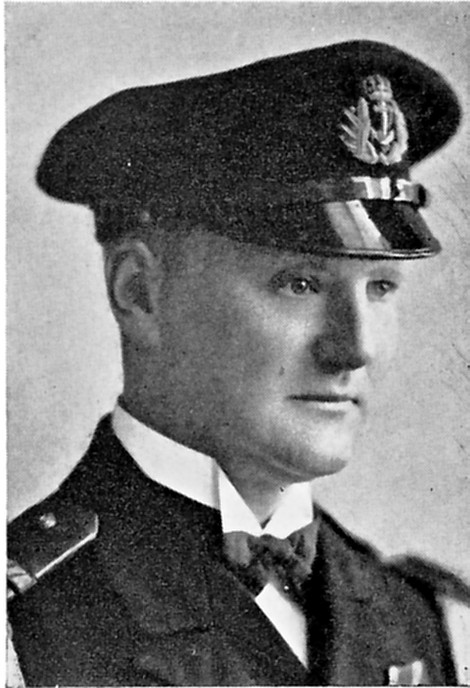
Finn Lützow-Holm, 1934

- Søren Kristian Sommerfelt (1851–1934), a Lutheran priest
- Anathon Aall (1867–1943), an academic, philosopher, and psychologist
- Isak Saba (1874–1921), the first Sami to be elected to the Stortinget
- Finn Lützow-Holm (1890–1950), a military officer, aviation pioneer, and polar explorer
- Anton Johnson Brandt (1893–1951), a veterinarian and academic
- Signe Iversen (born 1956), a Sami-language consultant and author of children's literature
- Raimo Valle (born 1965), a civil servant and politician for the Labour Party
- Silje Karine Muotka (born 1975), a member of the Sami Parliament of Norway
- Kirsti Bergstø (born 1981), a politician for the Socialist Left Party
- Agnete Johnsen (born 1994), a musician and lead singer of The BlackSheeps
