= Christian Sommerfeldt =

Norwegian geographer and civil servant

Christian Sommerfeldt (6 January 1746 – 30 May 1811) was a Norwegian geographer and civil servant.

== Personal life ==
He was born at Sukkestad in eastern Toten as a son of district stipendiary magistrate and chancellor councillor David Christian Sommerfelt (1717–1773) and Benedicte "Bente" Christine Hoff. His grandfather Christian Sommerfelt was also district stipendiary magistrate. His great-grandfather and uncle were both named Hans, and became priests. The latter worked in Denmark and became ancestor for a Danish family line. Christian Sommerfeldt became ancestor of a Norwegian branch of Sommerfeldts, and so did his brother Ole Hannibal. Through his sister Maria he was an uncle of Lauritz Weidemann.

Christian Sommerfeldt was married twice. First he married vicar's daughter Karen Magdalena Mandahl (1764–1791) in March 1784 in Land. After her death, in May 1793 in Christiania he married stipendiary magistrate's daughter Anna Sophia Hagerup (1775–1821). Their son Søren Christian Sommerfelt was a priest and botanist.

== Career ==
Sommerfeldt grew up at Sukkestad, and enrolled at the University of Copenhagen at the age of thirteen. He finished his theological studies at the age of twenty before studying geography and history at Sorø Academy. In 1776 he published the two textbooks Geographie til Ungdommens Brug and Kort Udtog af Geographien til Begynderes Bedste, which both came in six editions. He was offered to succeed Gerhard Schøning as professor in these subjects, but instead shifted his academic field again, to practical agriculture and national economy.

In 1776 he entered the Danish civil service. In 1779 he was promoted to chamber councillor (Danish: Kammerråd). In 1781 he was appointed as County Governor of Christians Amt, which he remained until his death in 1811. He resided at Sukkestad. In his position, he continued his endeavor for improving practical agriculture, forestry, and other rural enterprise in Christians Amt. He collected data from his county, and based on this data he published Efterretninger angaaende Christians amt in 1790. After the topographical society Topographisk Selskab for Norge was published in 1791 and started the journal Topographisk Journal for Norge, his text was reprinted there.

Preceded by Christian Frederik Holck	County Governor of Christians Amt; 1781–1811	Succeeded by Ole Hannibal Sommerfeldt
