= Oro jaska, beana =

Song by The BlackSheeps

"Oro jaska, beana" is a song by Norwegian-Saami group The BlackSheeps. It won both the Norwegian MGP jr contest in September 2008 and went on to win MGP Nordic 2008, beating songs from Denmark, Sweden and Finland.

The song reached #1 in the official Norwegian charts.

== Lyrics and topic ==
"Oro jaska, beana" is sung mainly in Norwegian, but has some phrases in Northern Sami. The phrase Oro jaska is Northern Sami for be quiet or shut up. The song is about a dog with health issues who later dies from excess blood pressure.

== Awards ==
The track won The BlackSheeps a Spellemann award (Norwegian "Grammy") in the category "Årets låt" ("Song of the year") at Spellemannprisen 2008.
