= Icebreaker (song) =

2016 song by Agnete

Single by Agnete
- Released: 2 February 2016
- Recorded: 2015
- Genre: Electropop; electrolament
- Length: 3:00
- Label: Aiko Music
- Songwriter(s): Agnete Johnsen; Gabriel Alares; Ian Curnow

Agnete singles chronology
"Hurricane Lover" (2015)	"Icebreaker" (2016)	"Beginning of the End" (2020)

Eurovision Song Contest 2016 entry
- Country: Norway
- Artist(s): Agnete
- Language: English
- Composer(s): Agnete Johnsen, Gabriel Alares, Ian Curnow
- Lyricist(s): Agnete Johnsen, Gabriel Alares, Ian Curnow

Finals performance
- Semi-final result: 13th
- Semi-final points: 63

Entry chronology
- ◄ "A Monster Like Me" (2015)
- "Grab the Moment" (2017) ►

"Icebreaker" is a song performed by Sami-Norwegian singer Agnete. The song represented Norway in the Eurovision Song Contest 2016, and was written by Agnete along with Gabriel Alares and Ian Curnow. The song was released as a digital download on 2 February 2016 through Aiko Music.

A music video for the song was released on 22 April 2016.

== Eurovision Song Contest ==
Agnete was announced as one of the ten competing artists in Melodi Grand Prix 2016 with the song "Icebreaker" on 19 January 2016. She performed in the final on 27 February, and was later announced as the winner, earning 166,728 votes from the Norwegian public. She represented Norway in the Eurovision Song Contest 2016, performing in the second semi-final on 12 May 2016, but failed to qualify to the 14 May final.

== Track listing ==
Digital download
No.	Title	Length
1.	"Icebreaker"	2:56

== Charts ==
Chart (2016)	Peak position
Norway (VG-lista)	11

== Certifications ==
Region	Certification	Certified units/sales
Norway (IFPI Norway)	Platinum	60,000^{‡}
^{‡} Sales+streaming figures based on certification alone.

== Release history ==
Region	Date	Format	Label
Worldwide	2 February 2016	Digital download	Aiko Music
