= Søren Christian Sommerfelt (botanist) =

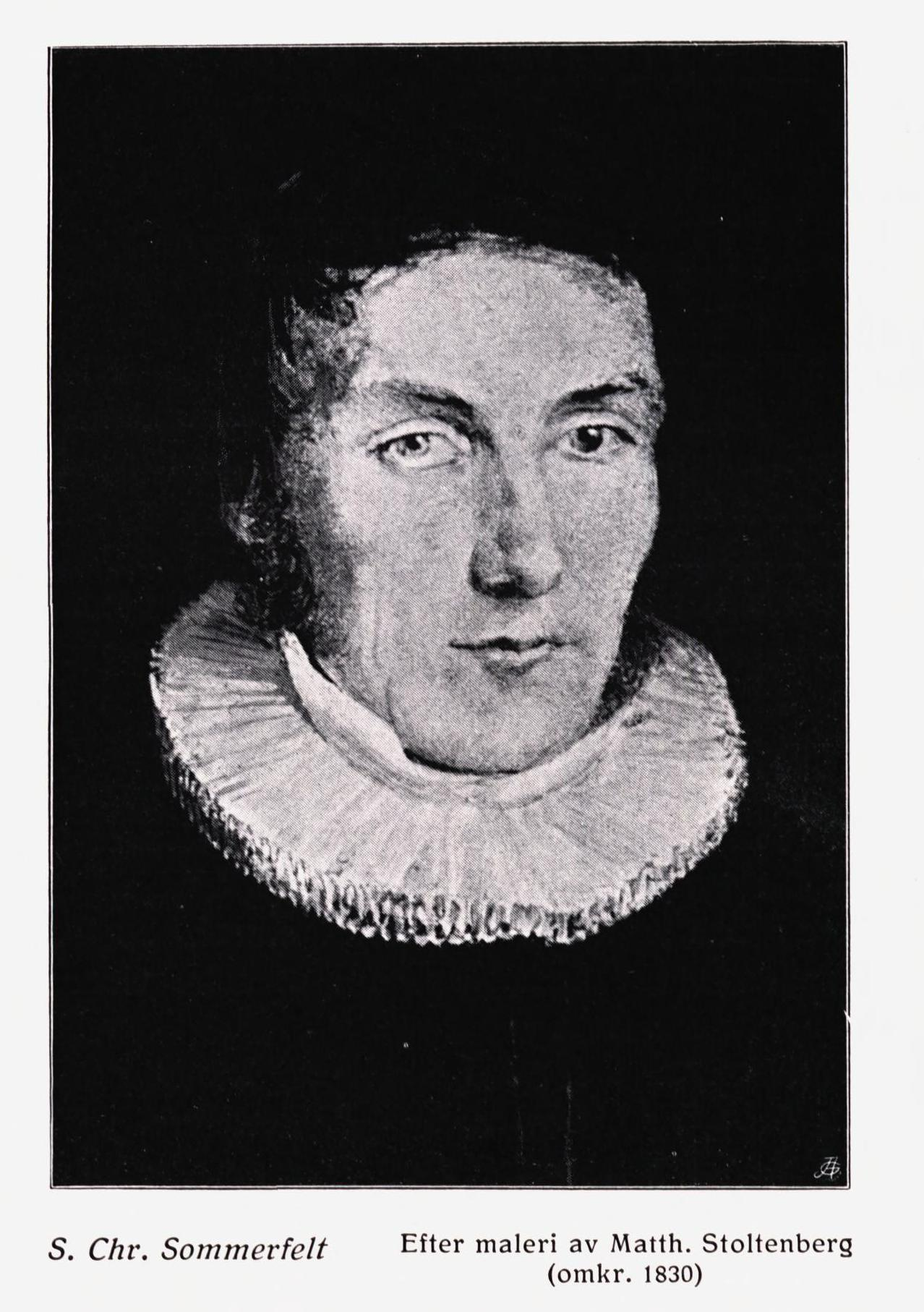
Søren Christian Sommerfelt

Søren Christian Sommerfelt (9 April 1794 – 29 December 1838) was a Norwegian priest and botanist, best known for his study of spore plants (cryptogams).

He was born in the Toten district of Oplandenes county, Norway. He was the son of County Governor Christian Sommerfelt (1746-1811) and Anna Sophie Hagerup (1775-1821). In 1811, when he was 15 years of age, he became a student at the University of Copenhagen. He first studied theology, but later focused on science. In 1816, he traveled to Oslo to continue his theological studies and earn his theological degree. In 1818 he was appointed parish priest at Saltdal Church in Nordland where he served until 1824. He was next assigned assistant pastor at Asker Church parish in Akershus and subsequently he was vicar in the Ringebu Stave Church parish in Oppland.

== Biography ==
Søren Christian Sommerfelt (born 9 April 1794 on the farm Sukkestad in Toten, died 29 December 1838 in Ringebu) was a Norwegian priest and botanist. Sommerfelt had a great interest in botany from childhood. Already as a 15-year-old he was sent to Copenhagen to study. Already as a student in Copenhagen, he was offered a position at the newly established university in Kristiania, but the dissolution of the union and other circumstances led to him not getting this. He rather studied theology, became a priest and worked tirelessly at botany in his spare time. In the first part of the 19th century, he was considered to be one of Norway's most talented botanists, despite the fact that it only had the opportunity to conduct research alongside his work in the ministry. Sommerfelt is considered to be the last Norwegian botanist with equally good knowledge of all groups of higher and lower plants.

He married Jørgine Maria Krohn on 28 May 1818, daughter of Johan Jørgen Krohn, and immediately afterwards took up the position of parish priest in Saltdal in June 1818. In Saltdal, he discovered the place's unusual flora and made many observations that turned into a very large scientific work. Of particular interest to historians is his description of the culture and folk life in Saltdal at this time. His descriptions are considered to be the best description of a Norwegian rural community at this time and can be used to understand conditions elsewhere in the region as well.

Although he worked very hard on botanical observations in Saltdal, he was also a skilled priest. The Bishop of Nordland and Finnmark Mathias Bonsach Krogh helped him advance his career in the ministry. On 24 February 1824 he became resident chaplain in Asker parish and in 1827 he became parish priest in Ringebu parish. The same year that he became parish priest in Ringebu, he had been on a study trip to Western Norway and contracted typhoid fever. This led to permanent impaired health and poor eyesight. Despite the disease, he continued with botanical studies until he died at just 44 years old. Two years before his death, he gathered leading Scandinavian botanists together at Ringebu.

Sommerfelt and his wife had ten children together, five girls and five boys. When he died, she was pregnant with the tenth child. She had to raise the children alone and had no large pension to live on. Nevertheless, several of the children received higher education, including Christian Sommerfelt, priest, mayor and member of the Storting, and Karl Linne Sommerfelt who became principal at Kristiansand Cathedral School.

Plants that bear his name include Aphaenogaster sommerfeldti and Pertusaria sommerfeltii. As a botanist, he described several new plant species, in particular cryptogams, and he has been described as the first mycologist in Norway. Among his works are Florae lapponicae from 1826, and Physisk-oeconomisk Beskrivelse over Saltdalen i Nordlandene from 1827. He issued two exsiccata series, one under the title Plantarum cryptogamicarum Norvegicarum, quas collegit ediditique S. Chr. Sommerfelt (1826-1830).
