= Claus Pilgaard =

Danish musician and entertainer (born 1965)

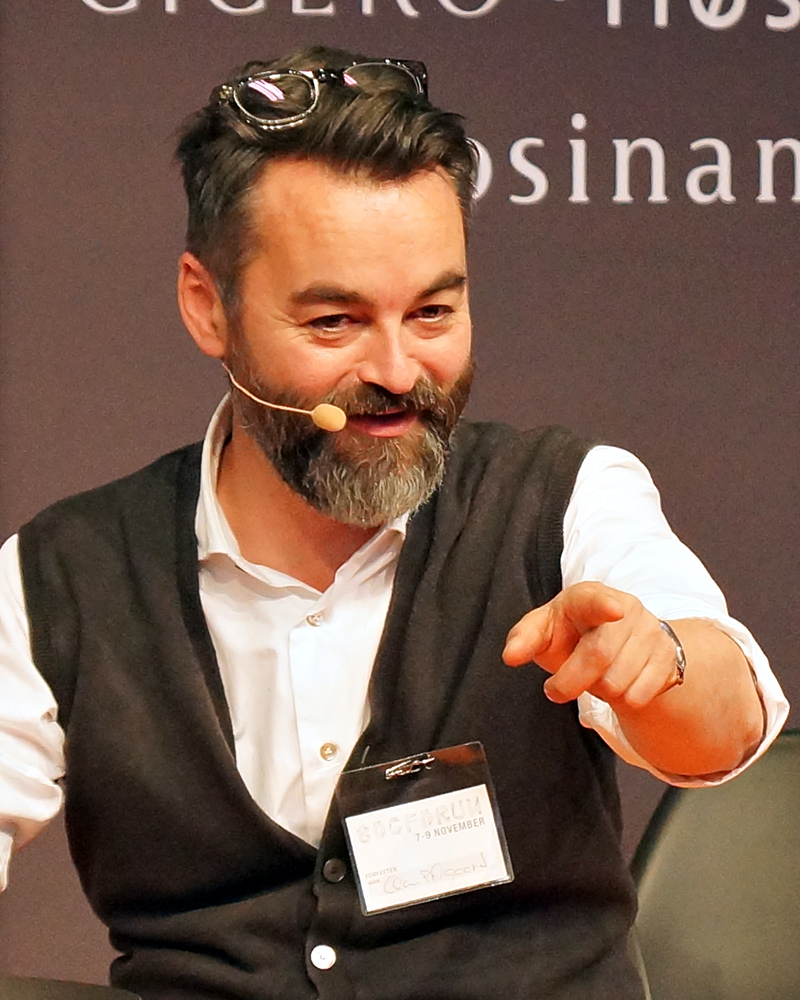
- Born: 30 March 1965 (age 60); Herning, Denmark
- Occupations: Musician, comedian
- Years active: 1996–present
- Spouse: Jette Torp (m. 2004; div. 2015)

Claus Pilgaard (born 30 March 1965), also known as Chili Klaus or Klaus Wunderhits, is a Danish musician and entertainer. He is best known for his Chilismagning series on the internet and on television. For the series, he invites celebrities and other notable figures on several occasions to eat chili peppers with him. One video in particular, where television presenter Bubber participated in the video, received around 2 million views on YouTube. Internationally, he is known for his collaborations with Sean Evans on his Hot Ones series on the First We Feast YouTube channel. Pilgaard has received numerous awards for his videos.

== Early life and career ==
Pilgaard is originally from the Tjørring suburb of Herning, but moved to Aarhus in 1992 when he applied for admission to the Royal Academy of Music in Aarhus. He graduated in 1996. He has been a bandleader for several revues, as he has performed with Jette Torp and Finn Nørbygaard, on the show Musik & Fis.

In his career as "Klaus Wunderhits", he has performed at Smukfest with Lasse Rimmer. Together with his former wife, he has played in the Variteté 007 show at the Tivoli Friheden in Aarhus. Pilgaard still performs with his show Wunderhits.

=== Eating chili peppers ===
Pilgaard started to grow his own chili peppers in 2008. He initially cultivated tomatoes, but he thought they smelt too much, and as a result, he began to grow chili peppers. He uploaded his first chili pepper-related video on YouTube on 5 August 2013. In addition, his Facebook page "Chili Klaus" has over 310,000 likes. In terms of consumption, he eats them both raw without accessories and produces juices, soda, dip, fruit salad, snaps, tea and fries with fruits made with peppers. In addition, he has special episodes where he, together with a well-known person, eats some of the world's strongest peppers. Notable guests include Christine Antorini, Bubber, Jacob Bundsgaard, Hella Joof, Jøden, Preben Kristensen, Allan Simonsen, Jette Torp, Kristian Valen, and the Danish National Chamber Orchestra, where they played Tango Jalousie while they ate chili peppers. The video with Bubber has over 3 million views as of 2026.

In August 2013, Pilgaard visited GO 'Aften Denmark, where he, together with the host Mikkel Kryger Rasmussen, tasted a chili pepper Pilgaard himself had grown. Apart from being clearly labeled as a chili pepper during the broadcast, he later stated that it took 10–15 hours before he got over it. After Gordon Kennedy's involvement in Klaus's videos, Kennedy made a parody of cooking with chili peppers, where Kennedy and Klaus taste sugar instead of chili peppers, but otherwise take place in the same way as Pilgaard's. The video was uploaded in November 2013. For Comedy Aid 2013, Pilgaard went to the stage in Copenhagen to challenge the hosts Christian Fuhlendorff and Carsten Bang to eat a very strong chili pepper.

For an event in the summer of 2014, he challenged about 1,000 people to a hot pepper challenge at the Rådhuspladsen in Copenhagen. Both Pilgaard and Bubber were hosts, and they ate ghost peppers.

At the end of October 2014, he uploaded a video where he, along with the Danish National Chamber Orchestra, ate Carolina Reaper, Trinidad moruga scorpion and ghost peppers at the Koncerthuset, and the orchestra subsequently played the Tango Jalousie conducted by Pilgaard himself. The broadcast of the video occurred while discussing the closure of the orchestra.

In December of the same year, he challenged the Brazilian television host Bruno de Luca to eat chili peppers with him, although Luca initially just wanted an interview for his travel program Vai Pra Onde?. Together with the chili pepper, they drank a pepper-based beer named after Pilgaard called "Chili Klaus Ghost", which is produced by Midtfyns Bryghus. Luca stated "I think I will die" before the clip ended, and afterwards he had to go to Århus Kommunehospital. Luca was the first guest to have been sent to the hospital after eating peppers with Pilgaard.

== Awards ==
At the Zulu Awards 2014, Pilgaard received the award "Årets Det grinte vi meget af-pris" along with Bubber for his series, which became a viral hit.

In June 2014, he won the "Mad på sociale medier" Award from mad+medier. The prize was given to him for his great passion for chili peppers, which he shares with people through YouTube.

== Personal life ==
Pilgaard married musician and entertainer Jette Torp on 29 December 2004. The couple divorced in 2015 after almost 11 years of marriage.

== External sources ==
- Claus Pilgaard at IMDb
