= List of Hot Ones episodes =

Hot Ones is an American YouTube talk show, created by Christopher Schonberger and Sean Evans and produced by First We Feast and Complex Media. Its basic premise involves celebrities being interviewed by Evans over a platter of increasingly spicy chicken wings.

399 episodes including seven bonus episodes and one removed episode have been released as of February 19, 2026.

== Series overview ==
Season	Episodes	Originally released	
Season	Episodes	First released	Last released
1	8	March 12, 2015	October 22, 2015
2	40	December 10, 2015	December 22, 2016
3	24	January 19, 2017	June 29, 2017
4	24	July 20, 2017	December 28, 2017
5	16	January 18, 2018	May 3, 2018
6	13	June 7, 2018	September 6, 2018
7	12	October 4, 2018	December 20, 2018
8	12	January 24, 2019	April 11, 2019
9	13	May 30, 2019	September 5, 2019
10	12	September 19, 2019	December 5, 2019
11	9	January 18, 2020	April 9, 2020
12	10	June 25, 2020	August 27, 2020
13	11	October 1, 2020	December 10, 2020
14	12	January 28, 2021	April 15, 2021
15	12	May 27, 2021	August 12, 2021
16	14	September 23, 2021	December 23, 2021
17	12	January 20, 2022	April 7, 2022
18	12	May 26, 2022	August 11, 2022
19	12	September 29, 2022	December 22, 2022
20	12	January 26, 2023	April 13, 2023
21	12	May 25, 2023	August 10, 2023
22	12	September 21, 2023	December 7, 2023
23	13	January 25, 2024	April 18, 2024
24	13	May 23, 2024	August 23, 2024
25	14	September 19, 2024	December 5, 2024
26	13	January 15, 2025	April 10, 2025
27	13	May 22, 2025	August 7, 2025
28	12	September 18, 2025	December 4, 2025
29	13	January 22, 2026	April 13, 2026
30	16	May 21, 2026	September 14, 2026
31	TBA	September 24, 2026	TBA

== Episodes ==
=== Season 1 (2015) ===
No. overall	No. in season	Title	Original release date
1	1	"Tony Yayo Talks Shmoney Dance and Eminem's Taco Habit While Eating Spicy Wings"	March 12, 2015
2	2	"Anthony Rizzo On Chicago Cubs Rivalries & Baseball Superstitions While Eating Spicy Wings"	May 12, 2015
3	3	"Machine Gun Kelly Talks Diddy, Hangovers, & Amber Rose While Eating Spicy Wings"	June 11, 2015
4	4	"Gunplay Talks Rick Ross, Wingstop, and X-Box Live Fights While Eating Spicy Wings"	June 23, 2015
5	5	"Ja Rule Talks 50 Cent Beef, Jail Recipes, and Media Stereotypes While Eating Spicy Wings"	August 11, 2015
6	6	"B.o.B. Talks Eggplant Fridays, Kid Rock, and Snapchat While Eating Spicy Wings"	August 26, 2015
7	7	"Prince Amukamara Talks NFL Salaries & Pre-Game Sex While Eating Spicy Wings"	October 7, 2015
8	8	"DJ Khaled Talks Fuccbois, Finga Licking, and Media Dinosaurs While Eating Spicy Wings"	October 22, 2015

=== Season 2 (2015–16) ===
No. overall	No. in season	Title	Original release date
9	1	"Curren$y Talks Munchies, Industry Games, and Rap Dogs While Eating Spicy Wings"	December 10, 2015
10	2	"Tinashe Talks NFL Dances and 2015's Sexiest Songs While Eating Spicy Wings"	December 17, 2015
11	3	"Tommy Chong Talks Weed, Bernie Sanders, and Smoking with Snoop While Eating Spicy Wings"	February 3, 2016
12	4	"T.J. Miller Talks Deadpool, Hecklers, and Relationship Advice While Eating Spicy Wings"	February 12, 2016
13	5	"Coolio Talks Hip-Hop Cooking and "Gangsta's Paradise" Folklore While Eating Spicy Wings"	March 7, 2016
14	6	"Joey Fatone Talks *NSYNC, DJ Khaled, and Guy Fieri While Eating Spicy Wings"	April 7, 2016
15	7	"Michael Rapaport Talks LeBron James, Phife Dawg, & Reality TV While Eating Spicy Wings"	April 13, 2016
16	8	"Key & Peele Lose Their Minds Eating Spicy Wings"	April 28, 2016
17	9	"Riff Raff Goes Full Burly Boy on Some Spicy Wings"	May 5, 2016
18	10	"Eddie Huang Gets Destroyed by Spicy Wings"	May 31, 2016
19	11	"Chris D'Elia Turns Into DJ Khaled While Eating Spicy Wings"	June 9, 2016
20	12	"Mike Epps Gets Crushed by Spicy Wings"	June 21, 2016
21	13	"Jim Gaffigan Rediscovers His Flop Sweat Eating Spicy Wings"	June 23, 2016
22	14	"Carly Aquilino Takes on the Spicy Wings Challenge"	June 30, 2016
23	15	"Redman Wilds Out Eating Spicy Wings"	July 7, 2016
24	16	"Rob Gronkowski Gets Blindsided by Spicy Wings"	July 14, 2016
25	17	"Rob Corddry Cries Real Tears Eating Spicy Wings"	July 21, 2016
26	18	"Jeff Ross Gets Roasted by Spicy Wings"	July 28, 2016
27	19	"David Cross Embraces the Extremes of Spicy Wings"	July 29, 2016
28	20	"Eric André Turns Into Tay Zonday While Eating Spicy Wings"	August 4, 2016
29	21	"Joe Budden Keeps It Real While Eating Spicy Wings"	August 11, 2016
30	22	"Matty Matheson Turns Into a Motivational Speaker Eating Spicy Wings"	August 18, 2016
31	23	"RZA and Paul Banks Tag Team Spicy Wings"	August 25, 2016
32	24	"Bert Kreischer Sweats Profusely Eating Spicy Wings"	September 1, 2016
33	25	"YG Keeps His Bool Eating Spicy Nuggets"	September 8, 2016
34	26	"Jay Pharoah Has a Staring Contest While Eating Spicy Wings"	September 15, 2016
35	27	"Harley Morenstein Has His Worst Day of 2016 Eating Spicy Wings"	September 22, 2016
36	28	"Travis Kelce Gets Woozy Eating Spicy Wings"	September 29, 2016
37	29	"Hasan Minhaj Has an Out-of-Body Experience Eating Spicy Wings"	October 6, 2016
38	30	"Kevin Hart Catches a High Eating Spicy Wings"	October 11, 2016
39	31	"Martin Garrix Tests His Limits Eating Spicy Wings"	October 20, 2016
40	32	"Bobby Lee Has an Accident Eating Spicy Wings"	October 27, 2016
41	33	"Tony Hawk Eats Spicy Wings LIVE at ComplexCon"	November 5, 2016
42	34	"Action Bronson Blows His High Eating Spicy Wings"	November 10, 2016
43	35	"T-Pain Has a Tongue Seizure Eating Spicy Wings"	November 17, 2016
44	36	"Rachael Ray Mainlines Hot Sauce for Thanksgiving"	November 24, 2016
45	37	"Tom Colicchio Goes Full Top Chef on Some Spicy Wings"	December 1, 2016
46	38	"Post Malone Sauces on Everyone While Eating Spicy Wings"	December 8, 2016
47	39	"N.O.R.E. Gets Wasted While Eating Spicy Wings"	December 15, 2016
48	40	"James Franco and Bryan Cranston Bond Over Spicy Wings"	December 22, 2016

=== Season 3 (2017) ===
No. overall	No. in season	Title	Original release date
49	1	"Padma Lakshmi Gracefully Destroys Spicy Wings"	January 19, 2017
50	2	"Joey "CoCo" Diaz Breaks Out the Blue Cheese While Eating Spicy Wings"	January 26, 2017
51	3	"Danny Brown Has An Orgasm Eating Spicy Wings"	February 2, 2017
52	4	"Ricky Gervais Pits His Mild British Palate Against Spicy Wings"	February 9, 2017
53	5	"Charlie Day Learns to Love Ridiculously Spicy Wings"	February 16, 2017
54	6	"Mac DeMarco Tries to Stay Chill While Eating Spicy Wings"	February 23, 2017
55	7	"Russell Brand Achieves Enlightenment While Eating Spicy Wings"	March 2, 2017
56	8	"Charlie Sloth Makes His Mum Proud Eating Spicy Wings"	March 9, 2017
57	9	"Kyle Kinane Gets Angry Eating Spicy Wings"	March 16, 2017
58	10	"Dax Shepard Does Mental Math While Eating Spicy Wings"	March 23, 2017
59	11	"H3H3 Productions Does Couples Therapy While Eating Spicy Wings"	March 30, 2017
60	12	"Keke Palmer Laughs Uncontrollably While Eating Spicy Wings"	April 6, 2017
61	13	"Charlamagne Tha God Gets Heated Eating Spicy Wings"	April 13, 2017
62	14	"DJ Snake Reveals His Human Side While Eating Spicy Wings"	April 20, 2017
63	15	"Guy Fieri Becomes the Mayor of Spicy Wings"	April 27, 2017
64	16	"Kevin Love Gets Dunked On By Spicy Wings"	May 4, 2017
65	17	"Neil deGrasse Tyson Explains the Universe While Eating Spicy Wings"	May 11, 2017
66	18	"Thomas Middleditch Does Improv While Eating Spicy Wings"	May 18, 2017
67	19	"Andy Cohen Spills the Tea While Eating Spicy Wings"	May 25, 2017
68	20	"Tom Arnold Melts Down While Eating Spicy Wings"	June 1, 2017
69	21	"Coyote Peterson Gets STUNG by Spicy Wings"	June 8, 2017
70	22	"Nick Kroll Delivers a PSA While Eating Spicy Wings"	June 15, 2017
71	23	"Superfan Brett Baker Grills Sean Evans Over Spicy Wings"	June 22, 2017
72	24	"Seth Rogen and Dominic Cooper Suffer While Eating Spicy Wings"	June 29, 2017

=== Season 4 (2017) ===
No. overall	No. in season	Title	Original release date
73	1	"Cara Delevingne Shows Her Hot Sauce Balls While Eating Spicy Wings"	July 20, 2017
74	2	"Liam Payne Gets Cocky Eating Spicy Wings"	July 27, 2017
75	3	"Steve-O Tells Insane Stories While Eating Spicy Wings"	August 3, 2017
76	4	"Vince Staples Delivers Hot Takes While Eating Spicy Wings"	August 10, 2017
77	5	"Adam Richman Fanboys Out While Eating Spicy Wings"	August 17, 2017
78	6	"ASAP Ferg Harlem Shakes While Eating Spicy Wings"	August 24, 2017
79	7	"Kevin Durant Sweats It Out Over Spicy Wings"	August 31, 2017
80	8	"Henry Rollins Channels His Anger at Spicy Wings"	September 7, 2017
81	9	"Dillon Francis Hurts His Body with Spicy Wings"	September 14, 2017
82	10	"Joji Sets His Face on Fire While Eating Spicy Wings"	September 21, 2017
83	11	"Wanda Sykes Confesses Everything While Eating Spicy Wings"	September 28, 2017
84	12	"Terry Crews Hallucinates While Eating Spicy Wings"	October 5, 2017
85	13	"Gary Vaynerchuk Tests His Mental Toughness While Eating Spicy Wings"	October 12, 2017
86	14	"Artie Lange Is Raw and Uncensored While Eating Spicy Wings"	October 19, 2017
87	15	"Chris Jericho Gets Body Slammed by Spicy Wings"	October 26, 2017
88	16	"Gabrielle Union Impersonates DMX While Eating Spicy Wings"	November 2, 2017
89	17	"Wale Battles Spicy Wings Live"	November 9, 2017
90	18	"Bob Saget Hiccups Uncontrollably While Eating Spicy Wings"	November 16, 2017
91	19 (Note: As of December 11, 2017, First We Feast made Season 4 Episode 19 unavailable to view both on YouTube and the show's official website, due to the controversy around Mario Batali being accused of sexual misconduct.)	"Mario Batali Celebrates Thanksgiving with Spicy Wings"	November 23, 2017
92	20	"Alexa Chung Fears for Her Life While Eating Spicy Wings"	November 30, 2017
93	21	"Logic Solves a Rubik's Cube While Eating Spicy Wings"	December 7, 2017
94	22	"Casey Neistat Melts His Face Off While Eating Spicy Wings"	December 14, 2017
95	23	"A Very Spicy Holiday Special"	December 21, 2017
96	24	"Chili Klaus Faces the Most Extreme Hot Ones Ever"	December 28, 2017

=== Season 5 (2018) ===
No. overall	No. in season	Title	Original release date
97	1	"Taraji P. Henson Needs a Stunt Double to Eat Spicy Wings"	January 18, 2018
98	2	"Sasha Banks Bosses Up While Eating Spicy Wings"	January 25, 2018
99	3	"Von Miller Geeks Out Over Spicy Wings"	February 1, 2018
100	4	"Rich Brian Experiences Peak Bromance While Eating Spicy Wings"	February 8, 2018
101 (Note: The 101st episode is listed as the 100th by the show (along with a shift in subsequent episode numbers), due to the removal of the episode featuring Mario Batali.)	5	"Hannibal Buress Freestyles While Eating Spicy Wings"	February 15, 2018
102	6	"Michael B. Jordan Gets Knocked Out By Spicy Wings"	February 22, 2018
103	7	"Ty Burrell Fears Sudden Death While Eating Spicy Wings"	March 1, 2018
104	8	"Charlize Theron Takes a Rorschach Test While Eating Spicy Wings"	March 8, 2018
105	9	"Adam Rippon Competes in the Olympics of Eating Spicy Wings"	March 15, 2018
106	10	"Gabriel Iglesias Does Wrestling Trivia While Eating Spicy Wings"	March 22, 2018
107	11	"Shawn Mendes Reveals a Different Side of Himself While Eating Spicy Wings"	March 29, 2018
108	12	"Philip DeFranco Sets a YouTube Record While Eating Spicy Wings"	April 5, 2018
109	13	"Trick Daddy Prays for Help While Eating Spicy Wings"	April 12, 2018
110	14	"Tyra Banks Cries For Her Mom While Eating Spicy Wings"	April 19, 2018
111	15	"Alton Brown Rigorously Reviews Spicy Wings"	April 26, 2018
112	16	"John Mayer Has a Sing-Off While Eating Spicy Wings"	May 3, 2018

=== Season 6 (2018) ===
No. overall	No. in season	Title	Original release date
113	1	"Johnny Knoxville Gets Smoked By Spicy Wings"	June 7, 2018
114	2	"Natalie Portman Pirouettes in Pain While Eating Spicy Wings"	June 14, 2018
115	3	"Marques Brownlee Rates Hot Sauce Labels While Eating Spicy Wings"	June 21, 2018
116	4	"Joel Embiid Trusts the Process While Eating Spicy Wings"	June 28, 2018
117	5	"Tom Segura Tears Up While Eating Spicy Wings"	July 12, 2018
118	6	"Joji and Rich Brian Play the Newlywed Game While Eating Spicy Wings"	July 19, 2018
119	7	"Wiz Khalifa Gets Smoked Out By Spicy Wings"	July 26, 2018
120	8	"Al Roker Gets Hit by a Heat Wave of Spicy Wings"	August 2, 2018
121	9	"Michael Cera Experiences Mouth Pains While Eating Spicy Wings"	August 9, 2018
122	10	"Issa Rae Raps While Eating Spicy Wings"	August 16, 2018
123	11	"Rhett & Link Hiccup Uncontrollably While Eating Spicy Wings"	August 23, 2018
124	12	"Jeff Goldblum Says He Likes to Be Called Daddy While Eating Spicy Wings"	August 30, 2018
125	13	"Eddie Huang Seeks Revenge Against Spicy Wings"	September 6, 2018

=== Season 7 (2018) ===
No. overall	No. in season	Title	Original release date
126	1	"Chrissy Teigen Gets Drunk on Spicy Wings"	October 4, 2018
127	2	"Tenacious D Gets Rocked By Spicy Wings"	October 11, 2018
128	3	"Anderson .Paak Sings Hot Sauce Ballads While Eating Spicy Wings"	October 18, 2018
129	4	"Adam Carolla Rants Like a Pro While Eating Spicy Wings"	October 25, 2018
130	5	"Lil Yachty Has His First Experience With Spicy Wings"	November 1, 2018
131	6	"E-40 Asks a Fan to Save Him While Eating Spicy Wings"	November 8, 2018
132	7	"Lilly Singh Fears for Her Life While Eating Spicy Wings"	November 15, 2018
133	8	"Blake Griffin Gets Full-Court Pressed By Spicy Wings"	November 22, 2018
134	9	"Bill Burr Gets Red in the Face While Eating Spicy Wings"	November 29, 2018
135	10	"Pete Holmes Does Improv While Eating Spicy Wings"	December 6, 2018
136	11	"Vanessa Hudgens Does Tongue Twisters While Eating Spicy Wings"	December 13, 2018
137	12	"Weird Al Yankovic Goes Beyond Insanity While Eating Spicy Wings"	December 20, 2018

=== Season 8 (2019) ===
No. overall	No. in season	Title	Original release date
138	1	"Gordon Ramsay Savagely Critiques Spicy Wings"	January 24, 2019
139	2	"Abbi and Ilana of Broad City Go Numb While Eating Spicy Wings"	January 31, 2019
140	3	"Seth Meyers Unravels While Eating Spicy Wings"	February 7, 2019
141	4	"Ken Jeong Performs a Physical While Eating Spicy Wings"	February 14, 2019
142	5	"Desus and Mero Get Smacked by Spicy Wings"	February 21, 2019
143	6	"Offset Screams Like Ric Flair While Eating Spicy Wings"	February 28, 2019
144	7	"Billie Eilish Freaks Out While Eating Spicy Wings"	March 7, 2019
145	8	"Shaq Tries to Not Make a Face While Eating Spicy Wings"	March 14, 2019
146	9	"Theo Von Fights the Dark Arts While Eating Spicy Wings"	March 21, 2019
147	10	"Jimmy Butler Goes Rocky Balboa on Spicy Wings"	March 28, 2019
148	11	"Chelsea Handler Goes Off the Rails While Eating Spicy Wings"	April 4, 2019
149	12	"Scarlett Johansson Tries To Not Spoil Avengers While Eating Spicy Wings"	April 11, 2019

=== Season 9 (2019) ===
No. overall	No. in season	Title	Original release date
150	1	"The Jonas Brothers Burn Up While Eating Spicy Wings"	May 30, 2019
151	2	"Halle Berry Refuses to Lose to Spicy Wings"	June 6, 2019
152	3	"Trevor Noah Rides a Pain Rollercoaster While Eating Spicy Wings"	June 13, 2019
153	4	"Aubrey Plaza Snorts Milk While Eating Spicy Wings"	June 20, 2019
154	5	"Schoolboy Q Learns to Respect Spicy Wings"	June 27, 2019
155	6	"Adam Devine Gets Patriotic While Eating Spicy Wings"	July 4, 2019
156	7	"Kumail Nanjiani Sweats Intensely While Eating Spicy Wings"	July 11, 2019
157	8	"Binging with Babish Gets a Tattoo While Eating Spicy Wings"	July 18, 2019
158	9	"Juice WRLD Eats Spicy Wings Live"	July 25, 2019
159	10	"Idris Elba Wants to Fight While Eating Spicy Wings"	August 1, 2019
160	11	"Kristen Bell Ponders Morality While Eating Spicy Wings"	August 8, 2019
161	12	"Stone Cold Steve Austin Puts the Stunner on Spicy Wings"	August 15, 2019
162	Bonus	"Jay Pharoah Channels Keanu Reeves While Eating Spicy Wings"	September 5, 2019

=== Season 10 (2019) ===
No. overall	No. in season	Title	Original release date
163	1	"Shia LaBeouf Sheds a Tear While Eating Spicy Wings"	September 19, 2019
164	2	"Ashton Kutcher Gets an Endorphin Rush While Eating Spicy Wings"	September 26, 2019
165	3	"Noel Gallagher Looks Back in Anger at Spicy Wings"	October 3, 2019
166	4	"Liza Koshy Meets Her Future Self While Eating Spicy Wings"	October 10, 2019
167	5	"Paul Rudd Does a Historic Dab While Eating Spicy Wings"	October 17, 2019
168	6	"Maisie Williams Shivers Uncontrollably While Eating Spicy Wings"	October 24, 2019
169	7	"Nick Offerman Gets the Job Done While Eating Spicy Wings"	October 31, 2019
170	8	"DaBaby Crushes Ice Cream While Eating Spicy Wings"	November 7, 2019
171	9	"Kristen Stewart Brings the Angels to Eat Spicy Wings"	November 14, 2019
172	10	"Chance the Rapper Battles Spicy Wings"	November 21, 2019
173	11	"Brad Leone Celebrates Thanksgiving With Spicy Wings"	November 28, 2019
174	12	"John Boyega Summons the Force While Eating Spicy Wings"	December 5, 2019

=== Season 11 (2020) ===
No. overall	No. in season	Title	Original release date
175	1	"Margot Robbie Pushes Her Limits While Eating Spicy Wings"	February 6, 2020
176	2	"Zoë Kravitz Gets Trippy While Eating Spicy Wings"	February 13, 2020
177	3	"Will Ferrell Deeply Regrets Eating Spicy Wings"	February 20, 2020
178	4	"Halsey Experiences the Jersey Devil While Eating Spicy Wings"	February 27, 2020
179	5	"Pete Davidson Drips With Sweat While Eating Spicy Wings"	March 5, 2020
180	6	"David Dobrik Experiences Real Pain While Eating Spicy Wings"	March 12, 2020
181	7	"Big Sean Goes On a Spiritual Journey While Eating Spicy Wings"	March 19, 2020
182	8	"Zac Efron Ups the Ante While Eating Spicy Wings"	April 2, 2020
183	9	"Justin Timberlake Cries a River While Eating Spicy Wings"	April 9, 2020

=== Season 12 (2020) ===
No. overall	No. in season	Title	Original release date
184	1	"Tom Segura Keeps It High and Tight While Eating Spicy Wings"	June 25, 2020
185	2	"Brie Larson Takes On a New Form While Eating Spicy Wings"	July 2, 2020
186	3	"Eric André Enters A Fugue State While Eating Spicy Wings"	July 9, 2020
187	4	"Dan Levy Gets Panicky While Eating Spicy Wings"	July 16, 2020
188	5	"Dua Lipa Sweats from Her Eyes While Eating Spicy Wings"	July 23, 2020
189	6	"T-Pain Tastes Gas While Eating Spicy Wings"	July 30, 2020
190	7	"Adam Richman Impersonates Noel Gallagher While Eating Spicy Wings"	August 6, 2020
191	8	"Action Bronson Shakes It Out While Eating Spicy Wings"	August 13, 2020
192	9	"Drew Barrymore Has a Hard Time Processing While Eating Spicy Wings"	August 20, 2020
193	10	"Joseph Gordon-Levitt Gets Cocky While Eating Spicy Wings"	August 27, 2020

=== Season 13 (2020) ===
No. overall	No. in season	Title	Original release date
194	1	"Jessica Alba Applies Lip Gloss While Eating Spicy Wings"	October 1, 2020
195	2	"Ronda Rousey Splits Bones While Eating Spicy Wings"	October 8, 2020
196	3	"Naomi Campbell Almost Faints While Eating Spicy Wings"	October 15, 2020
197	4	"Matthew McConaughey Grunts it Out While Eating Spicy Wings"	October 22, 2020
198	5	"Sam Smith Screams in Pain While Eating Spicy Wings"	October 22, 2020
199	6	"Saweetie Almost Tap Tap Taps Out While Eating Spicy Wings"	November 5, 2020
200	7	"Thundercat Relives a Hot Sauce Nightmare While Eating Spicy Wings"	November 12, 2020
201	8	"The Undertaker Takes Care of Business While Eating Spicy Wings"	November 19, 2020
202	9	"Lil Nas X Celebrates Thanksgiving With the Biggest Dab Ever"	November 26, 2020
203	10	"Daniel Radcliffe Catches a Head Rush While Eating Spicy Wings"	December 3, 2020
204	11	"The Hot Ones Holiday Special 2020"	December 10, 2020

=== Season 14 (2021) ===
No. overall	No. in season	Title	Original release date
205	1	"Priyanka Chopra Jonas Explains the Essence of Hot Sauce While Eating Spicy Wings"	January 28, 2021
206	2	"Dustin Poirier is Paid in Full While Eating Spicy Wings"	February 4, 2021
207	3	"Kevin James Forgets Who He Is While Eating Spicy Wings"	February 11, 2021
208	4	"Awkwafina Gets Hot and Cold While Eating Spicy Wings"	February 18, 2021
209	5	"Kenan Thompson Becomes a Card-Carrying Spiceman While Eating Spicy Wings"	February 25, 2021
210	6	"Anthony Mackie Quotes Shakespeare While Eating Spicy Wings"	March 4, 2021
211	7	"Paris Hilton Says "That's Hot" While Eating Spicy Wings"	March 11, 2021
212	8	"Jennifer Garner Says "Golly" While Eating Spicy Wings"	March 18, 2021
213	9	"J Balvin Meets The Devil While Eating Spicy Wings"	March 25, 2021
214	10	"Jeffrey Dean Morgan Can't Feel His Face While Eating Spicy Wings"	April 1, 2021
215	11	"Russell Brand Serenades Superfan Brett Baker While Eating Spicy Wings"	April 8, 2021
216	12	"Steve-O Takes It Too Far While Eating Spicy Wings"	April 15, 2021

=== Season 15 (2021) ===
No. overall	No. in season	Title	Original release date
217	1	"Jack Harlow Returns to the Studio to Eat Spicy Wings"	May 27, 2021
218	2	"Kamaru Usman Goes to the Mat Against Spicy Wings"	June 3, 2021
219	3	"Quavo Is Stunned by Spicy Wings"	June 10, 2021
220	4	"Elizabeth Olsen Feels Brave While Eating Spicy Wings"	June 17, 2021
221	5	"Olivia Rodrigo Burns Her Lips While Eating Spicy Wings"	June 24, 2021
222	6	"Malcolm Gladwell Hits the Tipping Point While Eating Spicy Wings"	July 1, 2021
223	7	"Ed Sheeran Tries to Avoid Failure While Eating Spicy Wings"	July 8, 2021
224	8	"David Harbour Feels Out of Control While Eating Spicy Wings"	July 15, 2021
225	9	"Michael Che Gs Up While Eating Spicy Wings"	July 22, 2021
226	10	"Lorde Drops the Mic While Eating Spicy Wings"	July 29, 2021
227	11	"Matt Damon Sweats From His Scalp While Eating Spicy Wings"	August 5, 2021
228	12	"Elijah Wood Tastes the Lava of Mount Doom While Eating Spicy Wings"	August 12, 2021

=== Season 16 (2021) ===
No. overall	No. in season	Title	Original release date
229	1	"Jimmy Kimmel Feels Poisoned by Spicy Wings"	September 23, 2021
230	2	"Derrick Lewis Is Not Okay While Eating Spicy Wings"	September 30, 2021
231	3	"Jon Bernthal Gets Punished by Spicy Wings"	October 7, 2021
232	4	"Megan Thee Stallion Turns Into Hot Girl Meg While Eating Spicy Wings"	October 14, 2021
233	5	"CL Gets Extra Spicy While Eating Spicy Wings"	October 21, 2021
234	6	"Mila Kunis Hits the Ranch While Eating Spicy Wings"	October 28, 2021
235	7	"Salma Hayek Adopts Sean Evans While Eating Spicy Wings"	November 4, 2021
236	8	"Jeremy Renner Goes Blind in One Eye While Eating Spicy Wings"	November 11, 2021
237	9	"David Chang Sweats Like Crazy While Eating Spicy Wings"	November 18, 2021
238	10	"Brad Underwood Gets Full Court Pressed By Spicy Wings"	November 20, 2021
239	11	"Rob Lowe Ruins Thanksgiving By Eating Spicy Wings"	November 25, 2021
240	12	"Simu Liu Chugs Boba While Eating Spicy Wings"	December 2, 2021
241	13	"Tom Holland Calls for a Doctor While Eating Spicy Wings"	December 9, 2021
242	14	"Gordon Ramsay Returns for the Hot Ones Holiday Extravaganza"	December 23, 2021

=== Season 17 (2022) ===
No. overall	No. in season	Title	Original release date
243	1	"Seth Rogen Scorches his Tongue While Eating Spicy Wings"	January 20, 2022
244	2	"Tracee Ellis Ross Calls For Her Mommy While Eating Spicy Wings"	January 27, 2022
245	3	"Ed Helms Needs a Mouth Medic While Eating Spicy Wings"	February 3, 2022
246	4	"Sebastian Stan Learns About Himself While Eating Spicy Wings"	February 10, 2022
247	5	"Andrew Zimmern Has a Bucket List Moment While Eating Spicy Wings"	February 17, 2022
248	6	"Dave Grohl Makes a New Friend While Eating Spicy Wings"	February 24, 2022
249	7	"Colin Farrell Searches for Meaning in the Pain of Spicy Wings"	March 3, 2022
250	8	"Courteney Cox Becomes Friends With Spicy Wings"	March 10, 2022
251	9	"Jacob Elordi Feels Euphoric While Eating Spicy Wings"	March 17, 2022
252	10	"Pusha T Has Beef With Spicy Wings"	March 24, 2022
253	11	"Leslie Mann Gets Revenge While Eating Spicy Wings"	March 31, 2022
254	12	"Josh Brolin Licks the Palate of Absurdity While Eating Spicy Wings"	April 7, 2022

=== Season 18 (2022) ===
No. overall	No. in season	Title	Original release date
255	1	"Post Malone Has His Brain Hacked By Spicy Wings"	May 26, 2022
256	2	"Millie Bobby Brown Needs a Milkshake While Eating Spicy Wings"	June 2, 2022
Brown's Stranger Things co-star Noah Schnapp made a cameo during the first wing.
257	3	"Queen Latifah Sets It Off While Eating Spicy Wings"	June 9, 2022
258	4	"Kevin Bacon Needs Six Degrees of Separation From Spicy Wings"	June 16, 2022
259	5	"Khloé Kardashian Holds Back Tears While Eating Spicy Wings"	June 23, 2022
260	6	"Andrew Callaghan Goes For the Marrow While Eating Spicy Wings"	June 30, 2022
261	7	"Tessa Thompson Feels Alive While Eating Spicy Wings"	July 7, 2022
262	8	"Daniel Kaluuya Listens to His Ego While Eating Spicy Wings"	July 14, 2022
263	9	"Bear Grylls Battles For Survival Against Spicy Wings"	July 21, 2022
264	10	"Mark Rober Gives Up on Science While Eating Spicy Wings"	July 28, 2022
265	11	"Lizzo Earns Her Hot Sauce Crown While Eating Spicy Wings"	August 4, 2022
266	12	"Neil Patrick Harris Needs Magic To Escape Spicy Wings"	August 11, 2022

=== Season 19 (2022) ===
No. overall	No. in season	Title	Original release date
267	1	"David Blaine Does Magic While Eating Spicy Wings"	September 29, 2022
268	2	"Kid Cudi Goes to the Moon While Eating Spicy Wings"	October 6, 2022
269	3	"Viola Davis Gives a Master Class While Eating Spicy Wings"	October 13, 2022
270	4	"Cole Bennett Needs Lemonade While Eating Spicy Wings"	October 20, 2022
271	5	"Cate Blanchett Pretends No One's Watching While Eating Spicy Wings"	October 27, 2022
272	6	"Emma Chamberlain Has a Spiritual Awakening While Eating Spicy Wings"	November 3, 2022
273	7	"James Corden Experiences Mouth Karma While Eating Spicy Wings"	November 10, 2022
274	8	"Ramy Youssef Lives on a Prayer While Eating Spicy Wings"	November 17, 2022
275	9	"Israel Adesanya Gives Thanks While Eating Spicy Wings"	November 24, 2022
276	10	"Zoe Saldaña Gets Scorched By Spicy Wings"	December 1, 2022
277	11	"Kate Hudson Stays Positive While Eating Spicy Wings"	December 8, 2022
278	12	"Paul Dano Needs A Burp Cloth While Eating Spicy Wings"	December 15, 2022

=== Season 20 (2023) ===
No. overall	No. in season	Title	Original release date
279	1	"Anna Kendrick Gets The Giggles While Eating Spicy Wings"	January 26, 2023
280	2	"Bryan Cranston Fully Commits While Eating Spicy Wings"	February 2, 2023
281	3	"Lenny Kravitz Stays Cool While Eating Spicy Wings"	February 9, 2023
282	4	"Austin Butler Searches For Comfort While Eating Spicy Wings"	February 16, 2023
283	5	"LL Cool J Needs Some Milk While Eating Spicy Wings"	February 24, 2023
284	6	"Jenna Ortega Doesn’t Flinch While Eating Spicy Wings"	March 2, 2023
285	7	"Pedro Pascal Cries From His Head While Eating Spicy Wings"	March 9, 2023
286	8	"Niall Horan Gets The Shakes While Eating Spicy Wings"	March 16, 2023
287	9	"Bob Odenkirk Has A Fire In His Belly While Eating Spicy Wings"	March 23, 2023
288	10	"Florence Pugh Sweats From Her Eyebrows While Eating Spicy Wings"	March 30, 2023
289	11	"Kieran Culkin Fires Sean While Eating Spicy Wings"	April 6, 2023
290	12	"Jake Gyllenhaal Gets a Leg Cramp While Eating Spicy Wings"	April 13, 2023

=== Season 21 (2023) ===
No. overall	No. in season	Title	Original release date
291	1	"Jason Sudeikis Embraces Da Bomb While Eating Spicy Wings"	May 25, 2023
292	2	"Julia Louis-Dreyfus Fires Her Publicist While Eating Spicy Wings"	June 1, 2023
293	3	"Rosalía Can’t Stop Laughing While Eating Spicy Wings"	June 8, 2023
294	4	"Melissa McCarthy Prepares For the Worst While Eating Spicy Wings"	June 15, 2023
295	5	"Jennifer Lawrence Sobs in Pain While Eating Spicy Wings"	June 22, 2023
296	6	"John Mulaney Seeks the Truth While Eating Spicy Wings"	June 29, 2023
297	7	"Lewis Capaldi Grasps for a Lifeline While Eating Spicy Wings"	July 6, 2023
298	8	"Harry Kane Takes One For the Team While Eating Spicy Wings"	July 13, 2023
299	9	"John Stamos Falls Out of His Chair While Eating Spicy Wings"	July 20, 2023
300	10	"Stephen Curry Is On Fire While Eating Spicy Wings"	July 27, 2023
301	11	"Anitta Lets It Fly While Eating Spicy Wings"	August 3, 2023
302	12	"Gal Gadot Does a Spit Take While Eating Spicy Wings"	August 10, 2023

=== Season 22 (2023) ===
No. overall	No. in season	Title	Original release date
303	1	"*NSYNC Breaks Another Record While Eating Spicy Wings"	September 21, 2023
304	2	"Cardi B Tries Not to Panic While Eating Spicy Wings"	September 28, 2023
305	3	"Bobby Flay Throws Down Against Spicy Wings"	October 5, 2023
306	4	"Doja Cat is Doing Great While Eating Spicy Wings"	October 12, 2023
307	5	"Mick Foley Has an Inferno Match Against Spicy Wings"	October 19, 2023
308	6	"Flea is Red Hot While Eating Spicy Wings"	October 26, 2023
309	7	"Amelia Dimoldenberg Goes on a Date With Spicy Wings"	November 2, 2023
310	8	"Louis Theroux Attacks the Shark While Eating Spicy Wings"	November 8, 2023
311	9	"Carmelo Anthony Goes Hard in the Paint While Eating Spicy Wings"	November 16, 2023
312	10	"Sebastian Maniscalco is Thankful While Eating Spicy Wings"	November 23, 2023
313	11	"Sterling K. Brown Performs Shakesphere While Eating Spicy Wings"	November 30, 2023
314	12	"Mark Ruffalo Suffers For His Art While Eating Spicy Wings"	December 7, 2023

=== Season 23 (2024) ===
No. overall	No. in season	Title	Original release date
315	1	"Sydney Sweeney Endures a Nightmare While Eating Spicy Wings"	January 25, 2024
316	2	"John Oliver Fears For Humanity While Eating Spicy Wings"	February 1, 2024
317	3	"Barry Keoghan Plays Hard to Get While Eating Spicy Wings"	February 8, 2024
318	4	"Lil Dicky Spits Hot Fire While Eating Spicy Wings"	February 15, 2024
319	5	"Quinta Brunson Faces Her Fear of Hot Ones While Eating Spicy Wings"	February 22, 2024
320	6	"Finn Wolfhard Embraces Insanity While Eating Spicy Wings"	February 29, 2024
321	7	"Jamie Dornan Gets Punched in the Face by Spicy Wings"	March 7, 2024
322	8	"Zayn Malik Lets the Tears Flow While Eating Spicy Wings"	March 14, 2024
323	9	"Gwyneth Paltrow Is Full of Regret While Eating Spicy Wings"	March 21, 2024
324	10	"Ice Spice Gets Melted By Spicy Wings"	March 28, 2024
325	11	"Shakira Howls Like a She-Wolf While Eating Spicy Wings"	April 4, 2024
326	12	"Conan O'Brien Needs a Doctor While Eating Spicy Wings"	April 11, 2024
327	Bonus	"Ludacris Gets Fired Up While Eating Spicy Wings"	April 18, 2024

=== Season 24 (2024) ===
No. overall	No. in season	Title	Original release date
328	1	"Chris Hemsworth Gets Nervous While Eating Spicy Wings"	May 23, 2024
329	2	"Lewis Hamilton Goes Full Send While Eating Spicy Wings"	May 30, 2024
330	3	"Will Smith Can't See While Eating Spicy Wings"	June 6, 2024
331	4	"Shane Gillis Pounds Milk While Eating Spicy Wings"	June 13, 2024
332	5	"Heidi Klum Strikes a Pose While Eating Spicy Wings"	June 20, 2024
333	6	"Lupita Nyong’o Feels Every Emotion While Eating Spicy Wings"	June 27, 2024
334	7	"Serena Williams Returns Hot Sauce Serve After Hot Sauce Serve While Eating Spicy Wings"	July 4, 2024
335	8	"Sabrina Carpenter Talks Nonsense While Eating Spicy Wings"	July 11, 2024
336	9	"Childish Gambino Goes on a Vision Quest While Eating Spicy Wings"	July 18, 2024
337	10	"Ryan Reynolds and Hugh Jackman Go Claws Out While Eating Spicy Wings"	July 25, 2024
338	11	"Vince Vaughn Catches a Hot Streak While Eating Spicy Wings"	August 1, 2024
339	12	"Ariana Grande Hits a High Note While Eating Spicy Wings"	August 8, 2024
340	Bonus	"Donald Duck Tries to Keep His Cool While Eating Spicy Wings"	August 23, 2024

=== Season 25 (2024) ===
No. overall	No. in season	Title	Original release date
341	1	"Zlatan Ibrahimović Gets Slide Tackled By Spicy Wings"	September 19, 2024
342	2	"SZA Bugs Out While Eating Spicy Wings"	September 26, 2024
343	3	"Jaylen Brown Goes Killer Whale Mode While Eating Spicy Wings"	October 3, 2024
344	4	"Pharrell Williams Sees the Future While Eating Spicy Wings"	October 10, 2024
345	5	"Peter Dinklage Breathes Fire While Eating Spicy Wings"	October 17, 2024
346	Bonus	"Peter Griffin Bares It All While Eating Spicy Wings"	October 21, 2024
347	6	"Ali Wong Has Beef With Spicy Wings"	October 24, 2024
348	7	"Jimmy Fallon Gets Spooked By Spicy Wings"	October 31, 2024
349	8	"Rosé Needs a Stress Ball While Eating Spicy Wings"	November 7, 2024
350	9	"Paul Mescal Is a Big Brave Strong Boy While Eating Spicy Wings"	November 14, 2024
351	10	"Bowen Yang Takes a Hero's Journey While Eating Spicy Wings"	November 21, 2024
352	Bonus	"T-Pain Regrets His Life Choices While Eating Spicy Wings"	November 25, 2024
353	11	"Demi Moore Celebrates Her Birthday While Eating Spicy Wings"	November 28, 2024
354	12	"Ben Stiller Giggles Uncontrollably While Eating Spicy Wings"	December 5, 2024

=== Season 26 (2025) ===
No. overall	No. in season	Title	Original release date
355	Bonus	"Lil Yachty Takes His Final Form While Eating Spicy Wings"	January 15, 2025
356	1	"Bad Bunny Risks His Life While Eating Spicy Wings"	January 23, 2025
357	2	"Stavros Halkias Brings His Own Ranch to Eat Spicy Wings"	January 30, 2025
358	3	"Questlove Refuses Defeat While Eating Spicy Wings"	February 6, 2025
359	4	"Lady Gaga Tries to Keep a Poker Face While Eating Spicy Wings"	February 13, 2025
360	5	"Rob McElhenney Needs to Walk It Out While Eating Spicy Wings"	February 20, 2025
361	6	"Lisa Dances Through the Pain While Eating Spicy Wings"	February 27, 2025
362	7	"Bill Murray Doesn't Flinch While Eating Spicy Wings"	March 6, 2025
Pete Davidson makes a guest appearance during the episode.
363	8	"Kevin Hart Celebrates 10 Years of Hot Ones While Eating Spicy Wings"	March 13, 2025
364	9	"Benny Blanco & Selena Gomez Burn With Love While Eating Spicy Wings"	March 20, 2025
365	10	"Eiza González Cries on Command While Eating Spicy Wings"	March 27, 2025
366	11	"Saquon Barkley Hurdles Over Spicy Wings"	April 3, 2025
367	12	"Will Forte Goes For a High Score While Eating Spicy Wings"	April 10, 2025

=== Season 27 (2025) ===
No. overall	No. in season	Title	Original release date
368	1	"Aaron Paul Gets Broken Bad While Eating Spicy Wings"	May 22, 2025
369	2	"Ana de Armas Does Her Own Stunts While Eating Spicy Wings"	May 29, 2025
370	3	"Tim Dillon Helps Himself to More Milk While Eating Spicy Wings"	June 5, 2025
371	4	"Dakota Johnson Is Not Okay While Eating Spicy Wings"	June 12, 2025
372	5	"Jennie Cries For Help While Eating Spicy Wings"	June 19, 2025
373	6	"Owen Wilson Feels the Walls Closing In While Eating Spicy Wings"	June 26, 2025
374	7	"Adam Levine Gives a Halftime Speech While Eating Spicy Wings"	July 3, 2025
375	8	"Kai Cenat Calls Sean a Liar While Eating Spicy Wings"	July 10, 2025
376	9	"Maria Sharapova Finds Flow State While Eating Spicy Wings"	July 14, 2025
377	10	"Nicole Scherzinger Regrets Double Dabbing While Eating Spicy Wings"	July 17, 2025
378	11	"Sam Rockwell Monologues His Pain While Eating Spicy Wings"	July 24, 2025
379	12	"Cody Rhodes Gets Power Slammed By Spicy Wings"	July 31, 2025
380	13	"Macaulay Culkin Is Up For a Goof While Eating Spicy Wings"	August 7, 2025

=== Season 28 (2025) ===
No. overall	No. in season	Title	Original release date
381	1	"Keke Palmer Heats Things Up While Eating Spicy Wings"	September 15, 2025
382	2	"Jason Bateman Threatens to Turn Into Teen Wolf While Eating Spicy Wings"	September 18, 2025
383	3	"Kate McKinnon Gets Weird While Eating Spicy Wings"	September 25, 2025
384	4	"Channing Tatum Punches Back While Eating Spicy Wings"	October 2, 2025
385	5	"Luka Dončić Gets Flagrant Fouled By Spicy Wings"	October 9, 2025
386	6	"Jeremy Allen White Embraces Chaos While Eating Spicy Wings"	October 16, 2025
387	7	"Adam Brody Surfs Through the Pain While Eating Spicy Wings"	October 23, 2025
388	8	"Rose Byrne Feels Crazy While Eating Spicy Wings"	October 30, 2025
389	9	"Woody Harrelson Goes Through Hell While Eating Spicy Wings"	November 6, 2025
David Blaine makes a guest appearance during the episode.
390	10	"Glen Powell Needs a Wingman While Eating Spicy Wings"	November 13, 2025
391	11	"Winona Ryder Needs More Ice Cream While Eating Spicy Wings"	November 20, 2025
392	12	"A'ja Wilson Insists She’s Good While Eating Spicy Wings"	November 27, 2025
393	13	"Matthew McConaughey Is Alright, Alright, Alright While Eating Spicy Wings"	December 4, 2025

=== Season 29 (2026) ===
No. overall	No. in season	Title	Original release date
394	1	"Jason Segel Won't Back Down While Eating Spicy Wings"	January 22, 2026
395	2	"Will Arnett Wants to Fire His Publicist While Eating Spicy Wings"	January 29, 2026
396	3	"MrBeast Faces His Scariest Challenge Yet While Eating Spicy Wings"	February 5, 2026
398	4	"Madison Beer Lives Out Her Dream While Eating Spicy Wings"	February 12, 2026
399	5	"Daniel Radcliffe Worries About the Aftermath While Eating Spicy Wings"	February 19, 2026
400	6	"Teyana Taylor Battles One Hot Sauce After Another While Eating Spicy Wings"	February 26, 2026
401	7	"Charlie Puth Beats Himself Up While Eating Spicy Wings"	March 5, 2026
402	8	"Colman Domingo Escapes the Jaws of Darkness While Eating Spicy Wings"	March 12, 2026
403	9	"Luke Combs Feels a Heat Hurricane While Eating Spicy Wings"	March 19, 2026
404	10	"Hilary Duff Tests Her Luck While Eating Spicy Wings"	March 27, 2026
405	11	"Oscar Isaac Has Beef With Spicy Wings"	April 2, 2026
406	12	"BTS Breaks Another Record While Eating Spicy Wings"	April 9, 2026
407	13	"Rachel Brosnahan Flies Through the Air While Eating Spicy Wings"	April 13, 2026

=== Season 30 (2026) ===
No. overall	No. in season	Title	Original release date
408	1	"Tim Howard Makes the Save While Eating Spicy Wings"	May 18, 2026
409	2	"Colin Jost Fights Fire With Fire While Eating Spicy Wings"	May 21, 2026
410	3	"Emily Blunt Is Up to the Challenge While Eating Spicy Wings"	May 28, 2026
411	4	"Becky G Conquers the Heat While Eating Spicy Wings"	June 4, 2026
412	5	"PinkPantheress Needs Ice While Eating Spicy Wings"	June 11, 2026
413	6	"Jesse Eisenberg Defies Doctor's Orders While Eating Spicy Wings"	June 18, 2026
414	7	"David Duchovny Lives the Technicolor Universe While Eating Spicy Wings"	June 25, 2026
415	8	"Penelope Cruz Laughs With Abandon While Eating Spicy Wings"	July 2, 2026
416	9	"Millie Bobby Brown Feels All the Feelings While Eating Spicy Wings"	July 9, 2026
417	10	"Marcello Hernandez Goes Into Fight or Flight While Eating Spicy Wings"	July 16, 2026
418	11	"Tom Holland and Jon Bernthal Team Up While Eating Spicy Wings"	July 23, 2026
419	12	"Jisoo is the Queen of Spice While Eating Spicy Wings"	July 29, 2026
420	13	"Callum Turner Keeps It Simple While Eating Spicy Wings"	August 6, 2026
421	14	"Dave Franco Throws Caution to the Wind While Eating Spicy Wings"	August 24, 2026
422	15	"Caleb Williams Has Ice in His Veins While Eating Spicy Wings"	September 3, 2026
423	16	"Rob Gronkowski Breaks the Gronk-O-Meter While Eating Spicy Wings"	September 14, 2026

=== Season 31 (2026) ===
No. overall	No. in season	Title	Original release date
424	1	"Willem Dafoe Comes Alive While Eating Spicy Wings"	September 24, 2026
425	2	"Mikey Madison Feels Cocky While Eating Spicy Wings"	October 1, 2026
426	3	"Liv Morgan Cuts a Promo While Eating Spicy Wings"	October 8, 2026
427	4	"Karl-Anthony Towns Goes One on One Against Spicy Wings"	October 15, 2026
428	5	"Maya Hawke Is Proud of the Progress While Eating Spicy Wings"	October 22, 2026
429	6	"Latto Is Resilient While Eating Spicy Wings"	October 29, 2026
430	7	"Mikey Day Breaks Character While Eating Spicy Wings"	November 5, 2026
431	8	"Julia Garner Burns Hers Tongue While Eating Spicy Wings"	November 12, 2026
432	9	"Michelle Yeoh Gets Physical While Eating Spicy Wings"	November 19, 2026

== Specials ==
No.	Title	Original release date
1	"Stephen Colbert does a 'Hot Ones' Interview with Sean Evans"	August 8, 2017
Interview performed on The Late Show with Stephen Colbert
2	"Selena Gomez and Jimmy Cry While Eating Spicy Wings (Hot Ones)"	June 11, 2019
Interview performed on The Tonight Show Starring Jimmy Fallon
3	"Priyanka Chopra Jonas and Jimmy Can't Sit Still While Eating Spicy Wings w/ Sean Evans (Hot Ones)"	October 10, 2019
Interview performed on The Tonight Show Starring Jimmy Fallon
4	"J. J. Watt and Jimmy Get Their Feelings Hurt While Eating Spicy Wings (Hot Ones)"	January 31, 2020
Interview performed on The Tonight Show Starring Jimmy Fallon
5	"Alex Rodriguez & Jimmy Socially Distance While Eating Spicy Wings w/ Sean Evans (Hot Ones)"	April 23, 2020
Interview performed on The Tonight Show Starring Jimmy Fallon
6	"Keke Palmer Listens to The Devil While Eating Spicy Wings"	May 6, 2021
Reunion Special. Palmer previously featured in episode #60 (Season 4, episode 12)
7	"Gordon Ramsay Returns for the Hot Ones Holiday Extravaganza"	December 23, 2021
Holiday Special. Part of Season 16.
8	"The Ultimate Sean Evans Interview"	June 1, 2022
Sean Evans is interviewed by former fellow Complex News co-anchor Speedy Morman. Part of Season 18.
9	"Gabriel Iglesias Feels Cursed By Spicy Wings"	July 11, 2022
Reunion Special. Part of Season 18. Iglesias previously featured in episode #106 (Season 5, episode 10)
10	"Puss in Boots Can't Feel His Tail While Eating Spicy Wings"	December 12, 2022
Promotional video for the film Puss in Boots: The Last Wish. Part of Season 19.
11	"Will Ferrell Brings the Spirit to the Hot Ones Holiday Extravaganza"	December 22, 2022
Holiday Special. Part of Season 19.
12	"Marques Brownlee Short Circuits While Eating Spicy Wings"	June 5, 2023
Reunion Special. Part of Season 21. Brownlee previously featured in episode #115 (Season 6, episode 3)
13	"Mortal Kombat Co-Creator Ed Boon Feels Toasty While Eating Spicy Wings"	September 7, 2023
Promotional video for Mortal Kombat 1.
14	"Tony Hawk Embraces the Pain While Eating Spicy Wings"	October 30, 2023
Reunion special. Part of Season 22. Hawk previously featured in episode #41 (Season 2, episode 33)
15	"Emma Chamberlain Goes for the Glory While Eating Spicy Wings"	March 4, 2024
Reunion special. Part of Season 23. Chamberlain previously featured in episode #272 (Season 19, episode 6)
16	"Sean Evans Interviews Himself While Eating Spicy Wings"	June 24, 2024
Promotional video for Heat Check vodka
17	"David Beckham Embraces the Moment While Eating Spicy Wings"	August 29, 2024
Promotional video for Stella Artois
18	"Ken Jeong Spreads Joy at the Hot Ones Holiday Extravaganza"	December 19, 2024
Holiday Special. Part of Season 25.
19	"Pete Davidson Drinks All the Milk While Eating Spicy Wings"	July 28, 2025
Reunion special. Part of Season 27.
20	"Patrick Schwarzenegger Proves the Naysayers Wrong While Eating Spicy Wings"	August 22, 2025
10th anniversary special.
21	"Sauce Gardner Earns his Nickname on the Hot Ones Football Special"	August 28, 2025
22	"Kristen Bell Gets Festive on the Hot Ones Holiday Extravaganza"	December 18, 2025
Holiday special. Part of Season 28.
23	"Ryan Reynolds and Kenneth Branagh Buddy Up Against Spicy Wings"	September 17, 2026
Promotional video for the film Mayday.
