= Conan O'Brien Needs a Doctor While Eating Spicy Wings =

- Hot Ones episode
- YouTube thumbnail
- Episode no.: Season 23; Episode 12
- Original air date: April 11, 2024
- Running time: 27 minutes

Guest appearances
- Conan O'Brien; José Arroyo

"Conan O'Brien Needs a Doctor While Eating Spicy Wings" is the twelfth and final episode of the twenty-third season of the American talk show Hot Ones. It premiered on YouTube on April 11, 2024. In the episode, host Sean Evans interviews television host and comedian Conan O'Brien. O'Brien's appearance on Hot Ones is regarded as one of the series's greatest.

== Episode ==
Appearing to promote his Max travel series Conan O'Brien Must Go, O'Brien was interviewed by Evans while eating Buffalo wings of increasing spiciness. Writer and producer José Arroyo appeared as O'Brien's physician, a "not very good, but very affordable" doctor who placed O'Brien into a chokehold to check his pulse and auscultated him from his tongue. During the interview, O'Brien explained that he would discuss interesting or provocative topics with guests during commercial breaks, recounting that he told Bea Arthur that she would live four years at most; Arthur died three years and eleven months later. He criticized guests who acknowledged vexatious interviews, recounted a perilous encounter with a water buffalo, and writing for Saturday Night Live from David Letterman's desk. O'Brien insulted the rebranding of HBO Max as Max.

Despite claiming that his Irish Catholic household avoided spicy foods, presenting a challenge for eating the wings, O'Brien—in boisterous exuberance—consumed the ten wings, dousing the hottest sauce on his face and drinking it. In an interview with Jake Tapper at the Paley Center for Media, O'Brien humorously stated that hot sauce got underneath his wedding ring and burned through his skin.

== Reception ==
O'Brien's appearance on Hot Ones is regarded as one of the series's greatest. (Note: Attributed to multiple references:) Actor Jamison Webb noted that O'Brien's comedy was effective for its old-fashioned quality, particularly O'Brien's discarded wings and Arroyo's performance. NPR's Glen Weldon stated that it was Hot Ones's greatest for O'Brien's consistent composure and ridicule towards the show's premise. The New York Times considered the video one of the most significant in YouTube's history.

The episode renewed interest in O'Brien's work; users on Twitter began posting Late Night with Conan O'Brien and Conan segments, including Ginger the Homicidal Dog, Pierre Bernard's Recliner of Rage, and Festus McGee. Comedians Josh Gondelman and Robert Smigel praised O'Brien after the episode.
