= Chiki Chiki =

Studio album by Anne Gadegaard
- Released: 11 March 2005
- Recorded: 2004
- Genre: Pop
- Label: My Way Music

Anne Gadegaard chronology
Ini Mini Miny (2004)	Chiki Chiki (2005)	De første og Største hits (2006)

Singles from Chiki Chiki
- 1. "Chiki Chiki" Released: 2005; 2. "Kan Du Mærke Beatet" Released: 2005

Chiki Chiki is Anne Gadegaard's third studio album, containing 13 songs. It was as successful as her first album Arabiens Drøm. It was released in 2005 but not in the UK or the US. The first single from the album was the song "Chiki Chiki", a song with a catchy pop feel to it. Other songs to be released as singles from the album were "Dub I Dub" (song by the group Me & My), "Du Er Ikke Alene Mere", "Vamonos", "Syd For Gibraltar" and "Kan Du Mærke Beatet"a.

== Track listing ==
(Titles is brackets are for rough translation purposes only)

1. Chiki Chiki
2. Dub-I-Dub
3. Giv En Chance Til (Give a second Chance)
4. Du Er Ikke Alene Mere (You are Not Alone Anymore)
5. MGP Sangen (MGP Song)
6. Vamonos
7. Syd For Gibraltar (South of Gibraltar)
8. Kan Du Mærke Beatet (Can You Feel The Beat)
9. Kærester (Boyfriends)
10. Kun En Drøm Herfra (Only a Dream From Here)
11. Sommeren Er Her (Summer Is Here)
12. Ønsketræet (Wish Tree)
13. Historien Om Den Magiske Lampe (The Story of the Magic Lamp)

== Chart performance ==
=== Weekly charts ===
Chart (2005)	Peak position
Danish Albums (Hitlisten)	3

== Release history ==
Region	Date	Format	Label
Denmark	11 March 2005	Digital download, CD	My Way Music
