= Suitcase (Anne Gadegaard song) =

Single by Anne Gadegaard
- Released: 27 January 2015
- Recorded: 2014
- Genre: Pop
- Length: 3:00
- Label: Sony Music Entertainment Denmark
- Songwriter(s): Micky Skeel; Magnus Funemyr
- Producer(s): Micky Skeel; Magnus Funemyr

Anne Gadegaard singles chronology
"Bag Skyerne" (2013)	"Suitcase" (2015)

"Suitcase" is a song by Danish singer and songwriter Anne Gadegaard. It was released as a digital download in Denmark on 27 January 2015 through Sony Music Entertainment Denmark. It finished second at the Melodi Grand Prix 2015 for a bid to represent Denmark at the Eurovision Song Contest 2015. The song won the televoting but lost to the winning song "The Way You Are" by Anti Social Media by six points. The song peaked at number 37 on the Danish Singles Chart.

== Music video ==
A music video to accompany the release of "Suitcase" was first released onto YouTube on 25 January 2015 at a total length of three minutes and seven seconds.

== Live performances ==
On 7 February 2015 she performed the song live on Melodi Grand Prix.

== Track listing ==
Digital download
No.	Title	Length
1.	"Suitcase"	3:00

== Chart performance ==
=== Weekly charts ===
Chart (2015)	Peak position
Denmark (Tracklisten)	37

== Release history ==
Region	Date	Format	Label
Denmark	27 January 2015	Digital download	Sony Music Entertainment Denmark
