= Anne Gadegaard =

- Also known as: Anne, Anne G
- Born: Anne Mondrup Gadegaard Jensen; 7 November 1991 (age 34); Aarhus, Denmark
- Origin: Danish
- Genres: Pop, Europop, Eurodance
- Occupations: Singer, songwriter
- Instrument: Vocals
- Years active: 2002–present
- Labels: Universal Music (2003); My Way Music (2004–2008); U&I Music (2010); Awake Music (2013–present)
- Website: www.annegadegaard.com www.annegadegaard.dk

Anne Mondrup Gadegaard Jensen (born 7 November 1991), better known as Anne Gadegaard, is a Danish singer and songwriter. She is best known for finishing 5th at the Junior Eurovision Song Contest 2003 while representing Denmark.

== Career ==
=== 2003: Junior Eurovision Song Contest 2003 and Arabiens Drøm ===
Anne started singing in 2002, inspired by the success of child singer Razz. In 2003, she entered the Danish MGP Contest 2003, where she was accepted, and later, won the competition to represent Denmark at the Junior Eurovision Song Contest 2003. Her song was called "Arabiens Drøm". Although it had very good reviews, it did not win the contest. The song finished 5th out of 16 participants, scoring 93 points. During that year, she released her debut studio album Arabiens Drøm.

=== 2004–05: Ini Mini Miny and Chiki Chiki ===
Anne's second studio album, Ini Mini Miny, was released in 2004 and her third Chiki Chiki, in 2005. Also in early 2005, she released her 1st music video Kan Du Mærke Beatet.

=== 2006: De første og Største hits and Annes Jul ===
She released her first compilation album called De første og Største hits in 2006, which includes a DVD of her performing live at the Langelandsfestivalen 2005. Anne released her 4th studio album, Annes Jul, during Christmas time 2006 with two editions for the album, standard one and deluxe edition. Soon after, she toured Italy.

=== 2008–14 ===
In 2008, she collaborated with the Danish singers Nicolai Kielstrup, Caroline Lind, B-Boys, Sebastian, Amalie, Mathias and Mark, in two music projects, presenting two songs called "En Verden Til Forskel" and "Gør Noget". Also in this year, some plans for a 5th studio album were cancelled. In 2010, she released a new single, entitled "Blah Blah", under the artistic name Anne G. After some months of the official release of the single, Anne released a music video for "Blah Blah". In 2013, she presented a new single, back as her original name Anne Gadegaard. The single was entitled "Bag Skyerne", and reached number 1 in iTunes Denmark and Norway.

=== 2015–present: Eurovision Song Contest ===
In 2015, Gadegaard was announced as one of the ten competing musicians in Dansk Melodi Grand Prix 2015 with the song "Suitcase". She finished second in the final behind the winning song "The Way You Are" by Anti Social Media, which became Denmark's first Eurovision song to fail to qualify since 2007.

== Discography ==
=== Studio albums ===
| Title | Details | Peak chart positions | |
| Title | Details | DEN | NOR |
|---|---|---|---|
| Arabiens Drøm | Released: 19 September 2003; Label: Universal Music; Formats: Digital download, CD | 4 | — |
| Ini Mini Miny | Released: 24 May 2004; Label: My Way Music; Formats: Digital download, CD | 2 | 13 |
| Chiki Chiki | Released: 11 March 2005; Label: My Way Music; Formats: Digital download, CD | 3 | — |
| Annes Jul | Released: 27 October 2006; Label: My Way Music; Formats: Digital download, CD | — | — |
"—" denotes an album that did not chart or was not released.

=== Compilation albums ===
| Title | Details | Peak chart positions | |
| Title | Details | DEN | NOR |
|---|---|---|---|
| De første og Største hits | Released: 2006; Label: My Way Music; Formats: Digital download, CD | 10 | 29 |

=== Singles ===
==== As lead artist ====
| Year | Title | Peak chart positions | Album |
| Year | Title | DEN | Album |
|---|---|---|---|
| 2003 | "Arabiens Drøm" | — | Arabiens Drøm |
| 2005 | "Chiki Chiki" | — | Chiki Chiki |
| 2005 | "Kan Du Mærke Beatet" | — | Chiki Chiki |
| 2010 | "Blah Blah" (credited as Anne G) | — | Non-album singles |
| 2013 | "Bag Skyerne" | 10 | Non-album singles |
| 2015 | "Suitcase" | 37 | Melodi Grand Prix 2015 |
"—" denotes a single that did not chart or was not released.

==== As featured artist ====
| Year | Title | Album |
|---|---|---|
| 2005 | "Here We GO!" (featuring Cool Kids, B-Boys, Shout, Amalie og Frederikke, Sigurd Barrett, Kaj og Andrea & Sebastian og Jeppe) | Non-album singles |
| 2008 | "En Verden Til Forskel" (featuring Nicolai Kielstrup, Sebastian, Amalie, Mathias & Mark) | Non-album singles |
| 2008 | "Gør Noget" (featuring Nicolai Kielstrup, Caroline Lind & B-Boys) | Non-album singles |

=== Music videos ===
| Year | Title |
|---|---|
| 2005 | "Kan Du Mærke Beatet" |
| 2010 | "Blah Blah" |
| 2013 | "Bag Skyerne" |
| 2015 | "Suitcase" |

Awards and achievements
| Preceded by None | Denmark in the Junior Eurovision Song Contest; 2003 | Succeeded by Cool Kids with "Pigen Er Min" |
