= Denmark in the Eurovision Song Contest 2015 =

- Eurovision Song Contest 2015
- Country: Denmark
- Selection process: Melodi Grand Prix 2015
- Selection date: 7 February 2015

Competing entry
- Song: "The Way You Are"
- Artist: Anti Social Media
- Songwriters: Remee; Chief 1

Placement
- Semi-final result: Failed to qualify (13th)

Participation chronology

Denmark was represented at the Eurovision Song Contest 2015 with the song "The Way You Are", written by Remee and Chief 1. The song was performed by the band Anti Social Media. The Danish broadcaster DR organised the national final Melodi Grand Prix 2015 in order to select the Danish entry for the 2015 contest in Vienna, Austria. Ten songs competed in a televised show where "The Way You Are" performed by Anti Social Media was the winner as decided upon through the combination of jury voting and public voting.

Denmark was drawn to compete in the first semi-final of the Eurovision Song Contest which took place on 19 May 2015. Performing during the show in position 13, "The Way You Are" was not announced among the top 10 entries of the first semi-final and therefore did not qualify to compete in the final. It was later revealed that Denmark placed thirteenth out of the 16 participating countries in the semi-final with 33 points.

== Background ==
Prior to the 2015 contest, Denmark had participated in the Eurovision Song Contest forty-three times since its first entry in 1957. Denmark had won the contest, to this point, on three occasions: in 1963 with the song "Dansevise" performed by Grethe and Jørgen Ingmann, in 2000 with the song "Fly on the Wings of Love" performed by Olsen Brothers, and in 2013 with the song "Only Teardrops" performed by Emmelie de Forest. In the 2014 contest, "Cliche Love Song" performed by Basim placed ninth in the final.

The Danish national broadcaster, DR, broadcasts the event within Denmark and organises the selection process for the nation's entry. DR confirmed their intentions to participate at the 2015 Eurovision Song Contest on 22 May 2014. Denmark has selected all of their Eurovision entries through the national final Dansk Melodi Grand Prix. Along with their participation confirmation, the broadcaster announced that Dansk Melodi Grand Prix 2015 would be organised in order to select Denmark's entry for the 2015 contest.

== Before Eurovision ==
=== Melodi Grand Prix 2015 ===
Melodi Grand Prix 2015 was the 45th edition of Dansk Melodi Grand Prix, the music competition that selects Denmark's entries for the Eurovision Song Contest. The event was held on 7 February 2015 at the Gigantium in Aalborg, hosted by Esben Bjerre Hansen and Jacob Riising and was televised on DR1 as well as streamed online at the official DR website. The slogan for the 2015 edition of the competition was Drømmen lever (The Dream Lives), while the three star logo that had been in use since the 2009 edition was replaced with a new logo that featured a round organism from which sound waves emanate.

==== Competing entries ====
DR opened a submission period between 4 July 2014 and 8 September 2014 for artists and composers to submit their entries. The entertainment director for DR, Jan Lagermand Lundme, stated that the competition would seek out "real songs that have a story to tell", mentioning the Eurovision Song Contest 2014 winning entry "Rise Like a Phoenix" and the second-placed entry "Calm After the Storm" as examples of such. The broadcaster received 687 entries during the submission period. A selection committee selected seven songs from the entries submitted to the broadcaster, while three of the participants were invited to compete based on editorial considerations.

The competing artists and songs were to be officially presented on 26 January 2015, however, the entries were leaked on 24 January 2015 due to an early delivery of pre-ordered CDs. DR subsequently confirmed the list of participants and held a press meet and greet on 26 January. Following the presentation, the entries were released on YouTube and the official album was made available on Danish streaming services. Among the competing artists was Anne Gadegaard who represented Denmark in the Junior Eurovision Song Contest 2003.

Artist	Song	Songwriter(s)	Selection
Andy Roda	"Love Is Love"	Andy Roda, Maria Hamer-Jensen	Open submission
Anne Gadegaard	"Suitcase"	Micky Skeel, Magnus Funemyr	Open submission
Anti Social Media	"The Way You Are"	Remee S. Jackman, Chief 1	Open submission
Babou	"Manjana"	Thomas Sardorf, Karen Rosenberg, Lasse Lindorff, Daniel Rothmann, Johannes Loeffler, Matthias Zürkler, Nicolas Rebscher	Open submission
Cecilie Alexandra	"Hotel A"	Marcos Ubeda, Bobby Ljunggren, Kristian Lagerström	Open submission
Julie Bjerre	"Tæt på mine drømme"	Lise Cabble, Maria Danielle Andersen, Jakob Schack Glæsner	Open submission
Marcel and Soulman Group	"Når veje krydses"	Marcel Mark Gbekle, Jeanette Christiansen, Bjarne List Nissen	Invited by DR
Sara Sukurani	"Love Me Love Me"	Sara Sukurani, Robert Uhlmann, Alexander Papaconstantinou, Arash Labaf	Invited by DR
Tina and René	"Mi amore"	Thomas G:son, Henrik Sethsson	Open submission
World of Girls	"Summer Without You"	Daniel Calvin Østergaard, Rune Braager, Martin Fliegenschmidt	Invited by DR

==== Final ====
The final took place on 7 February 2015. The winner, "The Way You Are" performed by Anti Social Media, was selected based on the combination of votes from a public vote (50%) and five regional juries (50%). The viewers and the juries each had a total of 290 points to award. Each jury group, composed of three members and headed by a former Danish Eurovision Song Contest entrant, distributed their points as follows: 1-8, 10 and 12 points. The viewer vote was based on the percentage of votes each song achieved through SMS voting. For example, if a song gained 10% of the viewer vote, then that entry would be awarded 10% of 290 points rounded to the nearest integer: 29 points. In addition to the performances of the competing entries, Danish Eurovision 2014 entrant Basim performed as the interval act.

Final – 7 February 2015
R/O	Artist	Song	Jury	Televote	Total	Place
1	Sara Sukurani	"Love Me Love Me"	8	13	21	10
2	Tina and René	"Mi amore"	24	20	44	7
3	Marcel and Soulman Group	"Når veje krydses"	26	18	44	8
4	Cecilie Alexandra	"Hotel A"	40	18	58	4
5	Andy Roda	"Love Is Love"	17	8	25	9
6	Julie Bjerre	"Tæt på mine drømme"	34	38	72	3
7	Anti Social Media	"The Way You Are"	56	48	104	1
8	Anne Gadegaard	"Suitcase"	40	58	98	2
9	Babou	"Manjana"	22	35	57	5
10	World of Girls	"Summer Without You"	23	34	57	6

Detailed Regional Jury Votes
R/O	Song	Zealand	Central Denmark	Capital Region	Southern Denmark	Northern Denmark	Total
1	"Love Me Love Me"	2	1	1	1	3	8
2	"Mi amore"	3	3	8	5	5	24
3	"Når veje krydses"	4	7	7	7	1	26
4	"Hotel A"	12	8	6	6	8	40
5	"Love Is Love"	1	10	2	2	2	17
6	"Tæt på mine drømme"	10	4	4	10	6	34
7	"The Way You Are"	8	12	12	12	12	56
8	"Suitcase"	6	6	10	8	10	40
9	"Manjana"	5	5	5	3	4	22
10	"Summer Without You"	7	2	3	4	7	23

Members of the Jury
Jury	Members
Zealand	Tim Schou (Chairperson) – singer, represented Denmark in the Eurovision Song Contest 2011 as part of A Friend in London; Maria Montell – singer; Lars Trillingsgaard – DR P3 music director
Central Denmark	Trine Jepsen (Chairperson) – singer, represented Denmark in the Eurovision Song Contest 1999 together with Michael Teschl; Claus Visbye – Skanderborg Festival manager; Jette Torp – singer; competed in Dansk Melodi Grand Prix 1997
Capital Region	Søren Poppe (Chairperson) – singer, represented Denmark in the Eurovision Song Contest 2001 as member of Rollo & King; Pelle Peter Jensen – DR P3 host; Anna David – singer; competed in Dansk Melodi Grand Prix 2014
Southern Denmark	Jakob Sveistrup (Chairperson) – singer, represented Denmark in the Eurovision Song Contest 2005; Trine Gadeberg – singer; competed in Dansk Melodi Grand Prix 2000; Maria Theessink – music manager and artistic director of Tønder Festival
Northern Denmark	Lotte Feder (Chairperson) – singer, represented Denmark in the Eurovision Song Contest 1992 with Kenny Lübcke; Jan H. Jensen – Head of Music at radio ANR; Henrik Milling – DR P7 Mix host

== At Eurovision ==
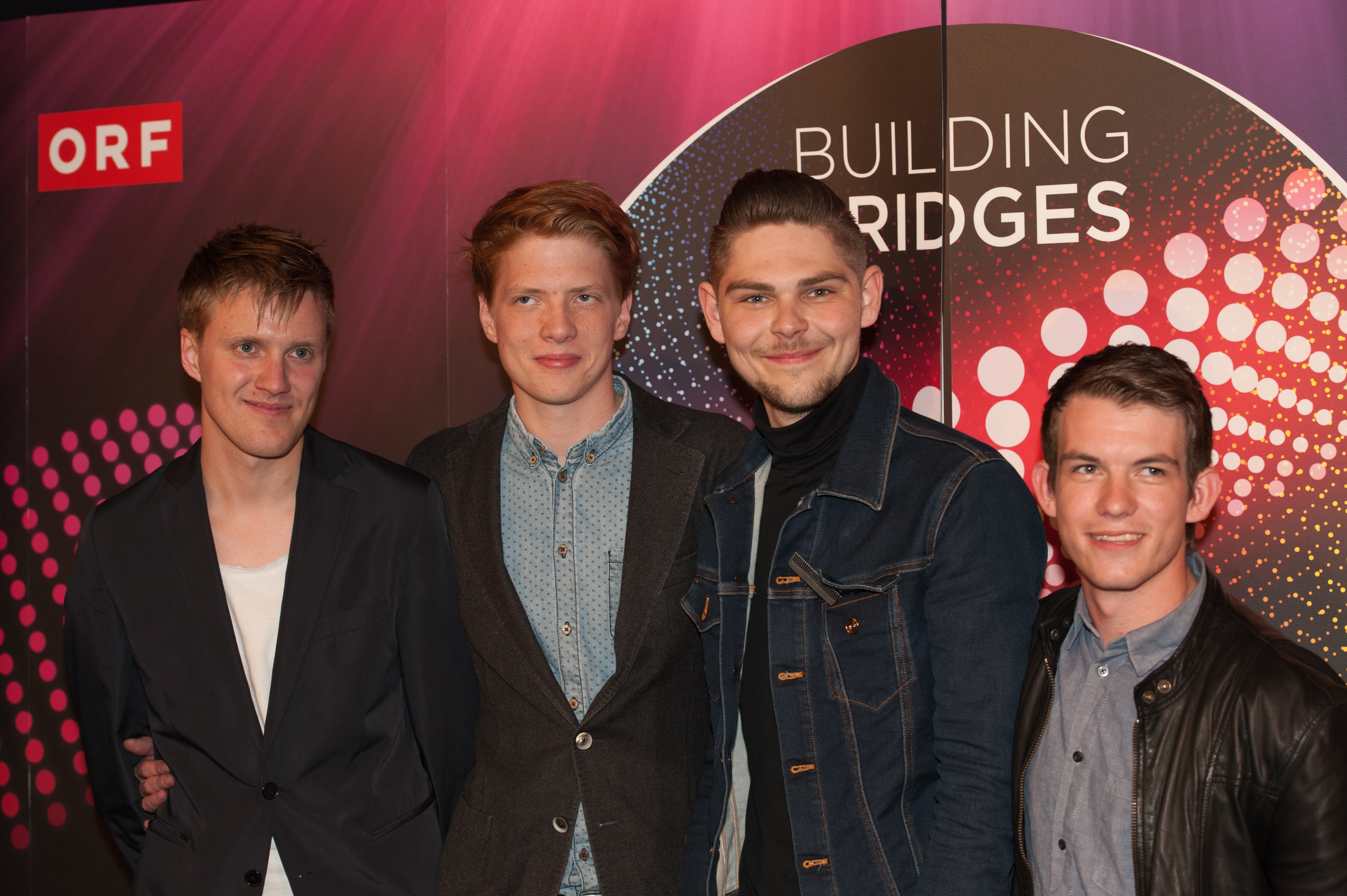
Anti Social Media during a press meet and greet

According to Eurovision rules, all nations with the exceptions of the host country and the "Big Five" (France, Germany, Italy, Spain and the United Kingdom) are required to qualify from one of two semi-finals in order to compete for the final; the top ten countries from each semi-final progress to the final. In the 2015 contest, Australia also competed directly in the final as an invited guest nation. The European Broadcasting Union (EBU) split up the competing countries into five different pots based on voting patterns from previous contests, with countries with favourable voting histories put into the same pot. On 26 January 2015, a special allocation draw was held which placed each country into one of the two semi-finals, as well as which half of the show they would perform in. Denmark was placed into the first semi-final, to be held on 19 May 2015, and was scheduled to perform in the second half of the show.

Once all the competing songs for the 2015 contest had been released, the running order for the semi-finals was decided by the shows' producers rather than through another draw, so that similar songs were not placed next to each other. Denmark was set to perform in position 13, following the entry from Russia and before the entry from Albania.

The two semi-finals and final were broadcast on DR1 with commentary by Ole Tøpholm. DR Ramasjang also broadcast the three shows interpreted in International Sign for the deaf and sign language users. The Danish spokesperson, who announced the Danish votes during the final, was 2014 Danish Eurovision entrant Basim.

=== Semi-final ===
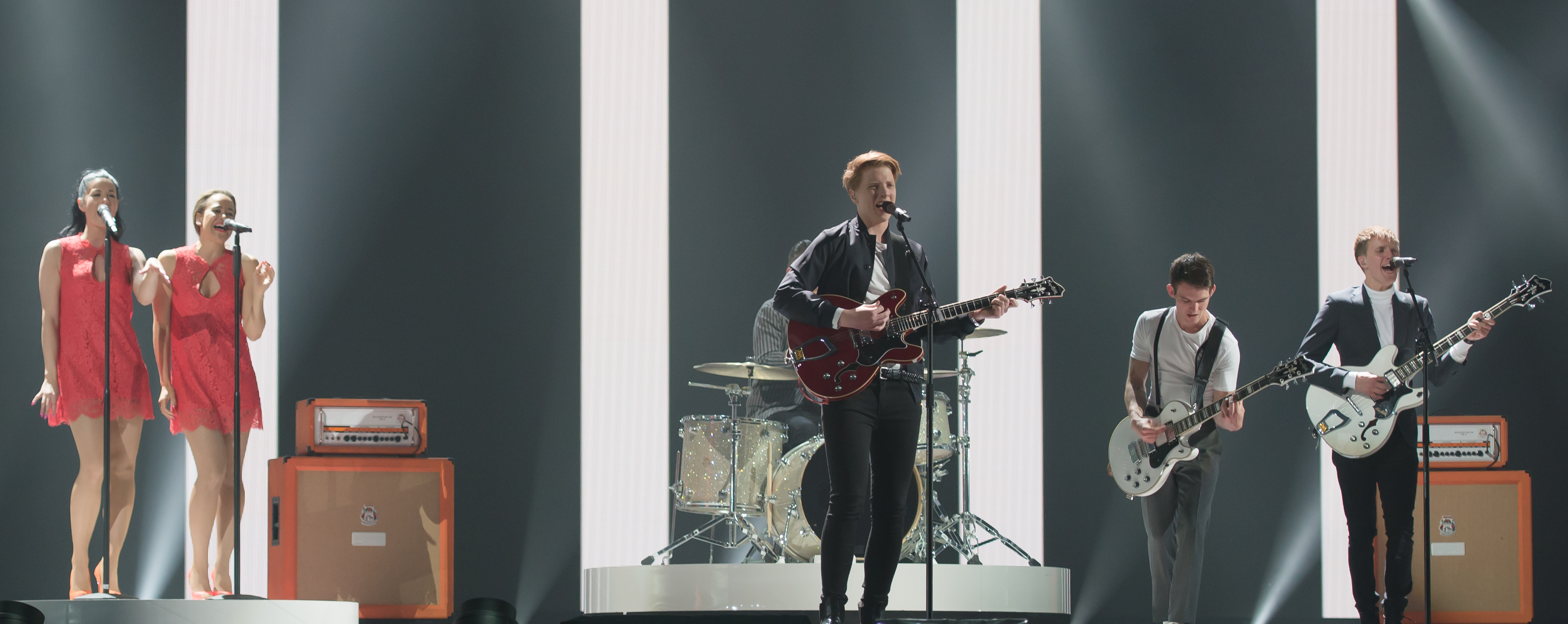
Anti Social Media during a rehearsal before the first semi-final

Anti Social Media took part in technical rehearsals on 12 and 15 May, followed by dress rehearsals on 18 and 19 May. This included the jury show on 18 May where the professional juries of each country watched and voted on the competing entries.

The Danish performance featured the members of Anti Social Media dressed in retro outfits and performing in a band set-up with two backing vocalists in red dresses. The stage colours were black and white and the LED screens displayed white moving vertical line patterns with added bursts of colours. The two backing vocalists that joined Anti Social Media were: Nellie Ettison and Johanna Beijbom.

At the end of the show, Denmark was not announced among the top 10 entries in the first semi-final and therefore failed to qualify to compete in the final. It was later revealed that Denmark placed thirteenth in the semi-final, receiving a total of 33 points.

=== Voting ===
Voting during the three shows consisted of 50 percent public televoting and 50 percent from a jury deliberation. The jury consisted of five music industry professionals who were citizens of the country they represent, with their names published before the contest to ensure transparency. This jury was asked to judge each contestant based on: vocal capacity; the stage performance; the song's composition and originality; and the overall impression by the act. In addition, no member of a national jury could be related in any way to any of the competing acts in such a way that they cannot vote impartially and independently. The individual rankings of each jury member were released shortly after the grand final.

Following the release of the full split voting by the EBU after the conclusion of the competition, it was revealed that Denmark had placed fourteenth with the public televote and twelfth with the jury vote in the first semi-final. In the public vote, Denmark scored 23 points, while with the jury vote, Denmark scored 51 points.

Below is a breakdown of points awarded to Denmark and awarded by Denmark in the first semi-final and grand final of the contest, and the breakdown of the jury voting and televoting conducted during the two shows:

==== Points awarded to Denmark ====
Points awarded to Denmark (Semi-final 1)
Score	Country
12 points	
10 points	
8 points	
7 points	Estonia; Hungary
6 points	
5 points	Romania
4 points	Australia
3 points	Netherlands
2 points	Armenia
1 point	Austria; Belgium; Finland; Greece; Spain

==== Points awarded by Denmark ====
Points awarded by Denmark (Semi-final 1)
Score	Country
12 points	Belgium
10 points	Russia
8 points	Estonia
7 points	Netherlands
6 points	Romania
5 points	Georgia
4 points	Hungary
3 points	Belarus
2 points	Finland
1 point	Serbia

Points awarded by Denmark (Final)
Score	Country
12 points	Sweden
10 points	Russia
8 points	Australia
7 points	Belgium
6 points	Estonia
5 points	Italy
4 points	Latvia
3 points	Norway
2 points	Romania
1 point	Lithuania

==== Detailed voting results ====
The following members comprised the Danish jury:

- Søren Poppe (jury chairperson) – singer, songwriter, represented Denmark in the 2001 contest as member of Rollo & King
- Micky Skeel Hansen – songwriter (jury member in semi-final 1)
- Jonas Schrøder – music producer, songwriter (jury member in the final)
- Anna David – singer
- Lotte Feder – singer, represented Denmark in the 1992 contest with Kenny Lübcke
- Tamra Rosanes – singer, songwriter

Detailed voting results from Denmark (Semi-final 1)
R/O	Country	S. Poppe	M. Skeel Hansen	A. David	L. Feder	T. Rosanes	Jury Rank	Televote Rank	Combined Rank	Points
01	Moldova	11	14	11	1	7	11	10	13	
02	Armenia	12	3	14	14	13	13	15	15	
03	Belgium	9	2	1	5	3	3	1	1	12
04	Netherlands	2	1	2	6	6	2	9	4	7
05	Finland	15	15	15	15	15	15	4	9	2
06	Greece	5	9	10	3	11	8	11	11	
07	Estonia	10	10	9	10	4	9	2	3	8
08	Macedonia	4	7	3	13	5	5	14	12	
09	Serbia	13	13	13	12	10	14	5	10	1
10	Hungary	6	12	12	4	9	10	6	7	4
11	Belarus	3	5	7	9	8	4	13	8	3
12	Russia	1	4	4	2	1	1	3	2	10
13	Denmark									
14	Albania	14	8	8	11	14	12	12	14	
15	Romania	8	11	6	8	2	6	7	5	6
16	Georgia	7	6	5	7	12	7	8	6	5

Detailed voting results from Denmark (Final)
R/O	Country	S. Poppe	J. Schrøder	A. David	L. Feder	T. Rosanes	Jury Rank	Televote Rank	Combined Rank	Points
01	Slovenia	18	24	12	13	12	18	14	16	
02	France	25	25	22	27	16	25	27	26	
03	Israel	23	23	21	17	13	21	8	13	
04	Estonia	8	3	9	9	4	5	7	5	6
05	United Kingdom	27	20	26	18	20	23	15	20	
06	Armenia	26	27	23	26	27	27	26	27	
07	Lithuania	13	17	6	14	6	9	13	10	1
08	Serbia	24	14	27	25	23	24	9	17	
09	Norway	16	13	8	6	15	10	6	8	3
10	Sweden	4	2	5	1	2	2	1	1	12
11	Cyprus	6	11	15	8	25	11	17	12	
12	Australia	2	10	4	4	5	3	2	3	8
13	Belgium	17	16	1	5	3	6	4	4	7
14	Austria	12	12	16	7	19	12	19	15	
15	Greece	11	15	17	12	18	15	25	21	
16	Montenegro	7	9	25	16	11	13	23	19	
17	Germany	10	18	13	19	17	16	12	11	
18	Poland	20	22	14	22	24	22	22	24	
19	Latvia	3	7	2	11	7	4	10	7	4
20	Romania	5	5	11	15	8	7	11	9	2
21	Spain	15	4	18	23	9	14	16	14	
22	Hungary	9	21	24	10	14	17	18	18	
23	Georgia	19	19	7	20	21	20	21	22	
24	Azerbaijan	14	6	19	21	22	19	24	23	
25	Russia	1	1	3	2	1	1	3	2	10
26	Albania	22	26	20	24	26	26	20	25	
27	Italy	21	8	10	3	10	8	5	6	5
