= De første og Største hits =

Greatest hits album by Anne Gadegaard
- Released: February 2006
- Recorded: 2003–05
- Genre: Pop
- Label: My Way Music

Anne Gadegaard chronology
Chiki Chiki (2005)	De første og Største hits (2006)	Annes Jul (2006)

De første og Største hits is a compilation album by the Danish singer Anne Gadegaard. It was released in 2006 and as with Anne Gadegaard's previous studio albums, it was not released in the UK or the US. The title translates as "The First and Greatest hits". The album reached #10 on the Danish album charts and #29 on the Norwegian album charts. This compilation album contains two bonus tracks, "Shoo Bi Doo" and "Gi Mig Alt".

== Track listing ==
(Titles in brackets are for rough translation purposes only)

1. Arabiens Drøm (Arabian Dream)
2. Louis
3. Choco Og Nugga (Chocolate and Nougat)
4. Prinsesserne På Is (Princess On Ice)
5. Ini Mini Miny Moe
6. Måneblomst (Moon Flower)
7. Skolefri (School is Free)
8. Ligesom En Drøm (Like a Dream)
9. Angel
10. Chiki Chiki
11. Du Er Ikke Alene Mere (You are Not Alone Anymore)
12. Vamonos
13. Kan Du Mærke Beatet (Can You Feel The Beat)
14. Ønsketræet (Wish Tree)
15. MGP Sangen (MGP Song)
16. Kærester (Boyfriends)
17. Dub I Dub (Dub In Dub)
18. Gi Mig Alt (Give Me Everything)
19. Shoo Bi Doo
- Skolefri means school is free from boundaries, as opposed to being without charge.

== Chart performance ==
=== Weekly charts ===
Chart (2006)	Peak position
Danish Albums (Hitlisten)	10
Norwegian Albums (VG-lista)	29

== Release history ==
Region	Date	Format	Label
Denmark	February 2006	Digital download, CD	My Way Music
