= Ini Mini Miny =

Studio album by Anne Gadegaard
- Released: 24 May 2004
- Recorded: 2003/04
- Genre: Pop
- Label: My Way Music

Anne Gadegaard chronology
Arabiens Drøm (2003)	Ini Mini Miny (2004)	Chiki Chiki (2005)

Ini Mini Miny is Anne Gadegaard's second studio album, released in 2004. It contains nine songs with five of them repeated in karaoke format. The album received as much success as the previous Arabiens Drøm album. Like the previous album it was not released in the UK or the US. The first single from this album was "Ini Mini Miny Moe", with a very similar style to the "Arabiens Drøm" song. Other songs to be released as singles from this album were "Måneblomst", "Skolefri" and "Angel". In 2005, the song "Ini Mini Miny Moe" was used in a Danish advertisement for the Cartoon Network.

== Track listing ==
(Titles in bracks are for translation purposes only)

1. Ini Mini Miny Moe
2. Måneblomst (Moon Flower)
3. Jeg Ta'r Til Cuba (I'll Take To Cuba)
4. Der Er Børn I Hele Verden (There are Children in the World)
5. Skolefri (School is Free)
6. Som Dig (As You)
7. Hele Verden Rundt (Whole World Round)
8. Ligesom En Drøm (Like a Dream)
9. Angel
10. Ini Mini Miny Moe: Karaoke
11. Jeg Ta'r Til Cuba: Karaoke (I'll Take To Cuba)
12. Måneblomst: Karaoke (Moon Flower)
13. Hele Verden Rundt: Karaoke (Whole World Round)
14. Der Er Børn I Hele Verden: Karaoke (There are Children in the World)
- Skolefri means free from school, like summerbreak, as opposed to not costing money.
- The song Ligesom En Drøm (Like a Dream) was quite successful online, despite not being released as a single.

== Chart performance ==
=== Weekly charts ===
Chart (2004)	Peak position
Danish Albums (Hitlisten)	2
Norwegian Albums (VG-lista)	13

== Release history ==
Region	Date	Format	Label
Denmark	24 May 2004	Digital download, CD	My Way Music
