= Andy Roda =

Danish singer

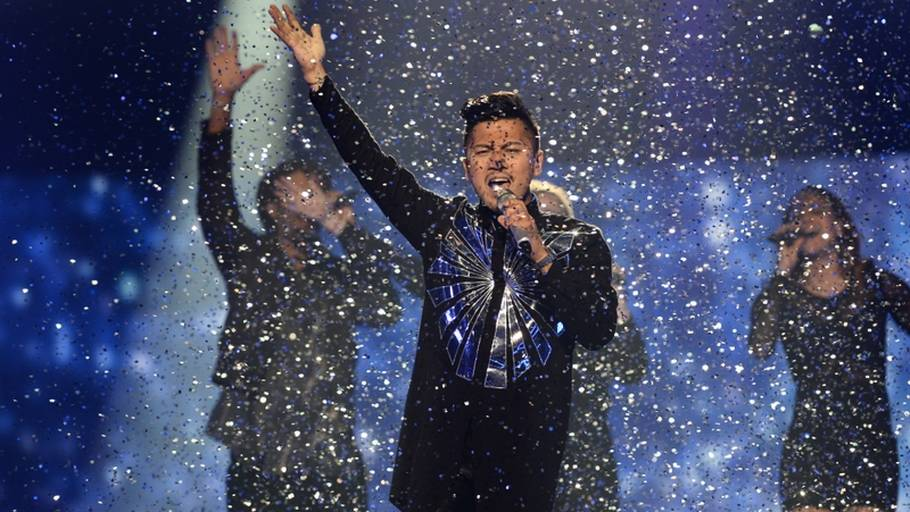

Background information
- Born: Andy Roda; 11 March; Copenhagen, Denmark
- Genres: Soulful House, R'n'B, Pop
- Occupations: Recording Artist, Singer, Songwriter, Producer, Engineer, Arranger, Musician, Performer, Actor, DJ, Entrepreneur
- Years active: 1997–present
- Labels: Virgin, Lifted House/DiscoWax/Sony, Bonnier Music, Star Records, Big Big Soundz, POGI Entertainment, King Street Sounds, Blacksoul Music, 4th Quarter, Simma Black, Ibadan Records, Milk & Sugar Recordings, ALIGN Records
- Website: www.andyroda.com

Andy Roda (born March 11) is a Danish-Filipino recording- performing- visual artist, curator and stage actor, dancer, DJ, and the owner of APEX Network GmbH a full service Gastronomy-Hospitality and Entertainment company and ALIGN Records. As a stage actor, he played "Babydoll" in Moulin Rouge - The Musical, as well as "The Engineer" (cover) in Miss Saigon.

== Early life ==
Andy Roda is the youngest child of two Filipino immigrants to Denmark. He grew up in Copenhagen in a home with no music other than the radio and a limited vinyl record collection.

He started his singing career with the Danish Boys Choir (Det Danske Drengekor). As a teenager Roda, was first signed to an independent label, but later discovered by Virgin Records.

== Career ==
=== DISH ===
After graduating from Sankt Annæ Gymnasium, Roda released his self-written and co-produced debut album Dish on Virgin Records in 1999. After a tour, he recorded a second album for the same label which was never released.

=== New York City ===
He subsequently relocated to New York City. Andy Roda first appeared on national television in the US when he competed in the show Next Big Star on Pax TV and came in second in the grand finale of the competition. In New York City, Andy Roda regularly performed in live venues, among other in Ashford & Simpson's Sugar Bar, and he performed as the opening act for R&B singer Jon B.

=== Philippines ===
- In 2007, Andy Roda released the single "Shake Yo Thang" and wrote and produced the song "Real Man" for Filipino superstar Vina Morales, as well as "Dancing Naked" for girl group the Kitty Girls. Both songs appeared on the Supahdance Album that was later certified gold. That same year, he founded the record label POGI Entertainment, mainly focusing on releasing his material. The first release was the EP/single "Aiyahh" which became part of an international advertising campaign for Puma fragrances, covering 15 European countries.
- Roda wrote and produced "Samson's Hair" for the 2009 Hollywood teen comedy Love at First Hiccup. For the Danish singer Monique Spartalis he also arranged and produced the song "Song for the Forgotten" of which the revenue was donated to the Danish Red Cross.

=== Safri Duo ===
- In 2009, Andy Roda toured as a backing vocalist with Danish superstar Thomas Helmig and also contributed in this role to Helmig's studio album Tommy Boy. On this tour, Roda was spotted by the multi-platinum selling act Safri Duo and invited to front their upcoming live tours and shows. Andy Roda and Safri Duo closed the Dni Morza Festival in Szczecin.
- In 2011 the "Superstar" single was released through POGI Entertainment. The official music video marked Andy Roda's debut as a director and visual effects animator.
- In June 2012, Roda and female DJ duo Delicious (consisting of Denise and Karina Jensen) formed the group A.R.D and released "Love Is In Your Heart" on Uniform Beat / Playground Music Scandinavia.

=== Eurovision Song Contest ===
- In the Eurovision Song Contest 2014, Roda was one of Basim's backing singers and dancers when they presented the Danish entry "Cliche Love Song" live on stage.
- In 2015, Roda participated himself in Dansk Melodi Grand Prix 2015, the Danish national pre-selection for the Eurovision Song Contest 2015. His entry "Love Is Love" was written by Andy Roda and Maria H. Jensen, and produced with the Pegboard Nerds.
- In the Eurovision Song Contest 2017, Roda joined the Danish delegation as backing vocalist for singer Anja Nissen with the song, "Where I Am".

=== ALIGN Records ===
- 2017 also marked the year of Andy Roda's rebranding of music, with a string of chart topping releases on acclaimed House Music labels, including KingStreet Records, Ibadan Records, Blacksoul records, Tinted Records, and his own ALIGN Records.

=== Peaking on the Official Australian ARIA Club Charts ===
"Get On Up" is an infectious house track made in collaboration with Italian duo Alaia & Gallo. The track spent more than 11 weeks on the Official Australian ARIA Club Charts, peaking at #6.

=== Theatre and Acting ===
- 2023: Roda was part of the original cast of "Moulin Rouge! The Musical" where portrayed the role of "Babydoll". The show was nominated for "Best Musical" at the 2024 "Reumertprisen".
- 2023: He joined the first International and Filipino cast in Denmark in the modern classic "Miss Saigon" as the understudy of "The Engineer".
- 2018: "Beat It - Die Show Über Den King Of Pop!" (Vocal Captain, Singer, Dancer, Actor) (Marlon Jackson, The Promoter, James Journalist). Roda is part of the first German theatre musical production "Beat It" based on "The King Of Pop" Michael Jackson's life, playing multiple roles, including Marlon Jackson, "The Promoter" and singing and dancing in iconic choreographies such as "Smooth Criminal", "Thriller", "Beat It" on tour in Germany, Switzerland, and Austria.
- 2017: "Efter Brylluppet" (After The Wedding - Oscar nominated movie by Susanne Bier turned musical theatre) playing the role as "Christian Refner" in "Efter Brylluppet" (After The Wedding) - by Danish director Susanne Bier a Best Foreign Film nominee at the Academy Awards in 2005. The musical theatre production was adapted for stage and directed by Peter Langdal, produced by Aarhus Musikhus, and Betty Nansen Theatre in Copenhagen.
- 2008: "Filipinos in America" (Lead Singer and Actor, "Randy")

=== Open Mic ===
- In 2018, Roda formed Berlin's Most Finest Open Mic - a regular live music showcase in Berlin.
- In January 2013, Roda organized the first "The Church Berlin" party in Kreuzberg neighbourhood in Berlin.

=== Oh Là Là - Official Selection and Winner at The International Film Festival Manhattan ===
In the summer of 2021, Roda released "Oh Là Là (Original and Remixes)" - the first of a string of new music and visuals, written, produced, directed, edited and color graded by himself. The single was well received by influential DJs and music blog Internationally and became an Official Selection at The International Film Festival Manhattan, where Roda then received the Silver Achievement Award in the "Professional Category".

== Andy Roda pres. "The Short & Sweet Session" ==
- In May 2020, during the height of the COVID-19 pandemic, Andy created his first weekly Facebook Live Series entitled "Andy Roda pres. The Short & Sweet Session" a series discussing the journey of an artist and entrepreneur, highlighting pivotal moments in the guest's career for educational and inspirational purposes. Guests included house music legends Robert Owens (musician), Tyree Cooper, Inaya Day, Linda Andrews (singer) (Winner of XFactor Denmark), Thomas Barsoe (Founder of OC Hit Factory and manager of Zhavia), Nyassa Alberta (Lead actress portraying Tina Turner in Tina (musical)) to name a few.

=== Season 1 (2020) ===
Andy Roda pres. "The Short & Sweet Session", Season 1 Episodes
| No. overall | No. in season | Title | Featured guest | Original release date |
|---|---|---|---|---|
| 1 | 1 | "Andy Roda pres. The Short & Sweet Session" ft. Lukas Großman" | Lukas Großman | May 21, 2020 |
| 2 | 2 | "Andy Roda pres. The Short & Sweet Session" ft. Dantanio Goodman" | Dantanio Goodman | May 28, 2020 |
| 3 | 3 | "Andy Roda pres. The Short & Sweet Session" ft. Gloria Ryann" | Gloria Ryann | June 4, 2020 |
| 4 | 4 | "Andy Roda pres. The Short & Sweet Session" ft. Nyassa Alberta" | Nyassa Alberta | June 11, 2020 |
| 5 | 5 | "Andy Roda pres. The Short & Sweet Session" ft. Thomas Barsoe" | Thomas Barsoe | June 18, 2020 |
| 6 | 6 | "Andy Roda pres. The Short & Sweet Session" ft. Inaya Day" | Inaya Day | June 26, 2020 |
| 7 | 7 | "Andy Roda pres. The Short & Sweet Session" ft. Dorrey Lyles" | Dorrey Lyles | July 2, 2020 |
| 8 | 8 | "Andy Roda pres. The Short & Sweet Session" ft. Robert Owens" | Robert Owens (musician) | July 9, 2020 |
| 9 | 9 | "Andy Roda pres. The Short & Sweet Session" ft. Linda Andrews" | Linda Andrews (singer) | July 16, 2020 |
| 10 | 10 | "Andy Roda pres. The Short & Sweet Session" ft. Sharooz Raoofi" | Sharooz | July 23, 2020 |
| 11 | 11 | "Andy Roda pres. The Short & Sweet Session" ft. Julie Lindell" | Julie Lindell | July 30, 2020 |
| 12 | 12 | "Andy Roda pres. The Short & Sweet Session" ft. Ingrid Arthur" | Ingrid Arthur | August 6, 2020 |
| 13 | 13 | "Andy Roda pres. "The Short & Sweet Session" ft. Claus Christensen" | Claus Christensen | August 13, 2020 |

=== Season 2 (2020) ===
Andy Roda pres. "The Short & Sweet Session", Season 2 Episodes
| No. overall | No. in season | Title | Featured guest | Original release date |
|---|---|---|---|---|
| 14 | 1 | "Andy Roda pres. The Short & Sweet Session" ft. Tyree Cooper" | Tyree Cooper | September 3, 2020 |
| 15 | 2 | "Andy Roda pres. The Short & Sweet Session" ft. Clayton Bryant" | Clayton Bryant | September 10, 2020 |
| 16 | 3 | "Andy Roda pres. The Short & Sweet Session" ft. Diane Phelan" | Gloria Ryann | September 20, 2020 |
| 17 | 4 | "Andy Roda pres. The Short & Sweet Session" ft. Pastor Greg Stamper" | Pastor Greg Stamper | September 27, 2020 |
| 18 | 5 | "Andy Roda pres. The Short & Sweet Session" ft. Zindy Laursen" | Zindy Laursen (of Cut 'N' Move) | October 11, 2020 |
| 19 | 6 | "Andy Roda pres. The Short & Sweet Session" ft. Milo Lee" | Milo Lee | October 18, 2020 |
| 20 | 7 | "Andy Roda pres. The Short & Sweet Session" ft. Bill Coleman" | Bill Coleman | October 29, 2020 |
| 21 | 8 | "Andy Roda pres. The Short & Sweet Session" ft. Marlin Monroe Williford" | Marlin Monroe Williford | November 8, 2020 |
| 22 | 9 | "Andy Roda pres. The Short & Sweet Session" ft. Tom Hugo" | Tom Hugo (of Keiino) | November 22, 2020 |

== Discography ==
=== Albums ===
- 1999: “Dish” (Virgin Records) (Artist, Writer, Co-Producer)

=== Singles ===
- 2025: “Beautiful” [XXV] (ALIGN Records Records)
- 2022: “Closer” [Original Mix] (ALIGN Records Records)
- 2021: “Oh Là Là” [Original Mixes & Classic Club Mixes] (ALIGN Records Records) (Silver Achievement Award Winner, International Film Festival Manhattan (Artist & Director))
- 2017: “Get On Up” (Tinted Records) (Peaked at #6 on the Official Australian ARIA Club Chart)
- 2017: “Please” (Pannoc, Andy Roda) (Street King)
- 2017: “Dance On” (Blacksoul Music) (Traxsource Charts: #1 Essential House, #2 Hype Chart, #2 Weekend Weapons Chart)
- 2017: “Never Knew” (4th Quarter Music)
- 2017: “Lovin You EP” (ALIGN Records)
- 2017: “Movin ’n Werkin’” (Simma Black) (Traxsource Charts: #117 in Top 200 Of 2017, #2 Essential House, #8 Hype Chart, #13 Weekend Weapons)
- 2017: “Rock The Boat” (ALIGN Records) (Traxsource Charts: #14 Essential Jackin)
- 2017: “Fired Up” (with Jerome Sydenham feat. Dorrey Lyles) (Ibadan Records) (Traxsource Charts: #2 Essential Soulful, #2 Hype Chart, #8 Weekend Weapons)
- 2017: “U Don’t Even Know Me” (King Street Sounds) (Traxsource Charts: #10 Essential Soulful)
- 2016: “High On Love” (King Street Sounds)
- 2015: "Love Is Love" (SONY)
- 2013: "I'm Here" - Thomas Mengel feat. Andy Roda (Lifted House / SONY)
- 2012: "Superstar" (POGI)
- 2012: "Love Is In Your Heart" (as part of A.R.D.)
- 2011: "Beautiful" (Lifted House / SONY)
- 2010: "Shake Your Thang"(POGI)
- 2009: "Ready 2 Love U" (POGI)
- 2009: Dee-Nice feat. Andy Roda - "I'm Ready"
- 2009: Andy Roda - "Slave" (Soundtrack of the documentary Naked Ambition: An R Rated Look at an X Rated Industry)
- 2009: "Samson's Hair" (OST Love at First Hiccup)
- 2008: "Aiyahh" (POGI)
- 2006: "Step By Step" - Ron Gelfer feat. Andy Roda (Disco:Wax / SONY)
- 2004: "Crying Days Are Over" - Zindy feat. Andy Roda
- 2001: "Nyd livet”- Clemens feat. Andy Roda -
- 1999: "Something to Talk About" (Virgin)
- 1999: "Secret" (Virgin)
- 1998: "The Power" (Virgin)

=== Appears On ===
- 2024: Firebuds - "Hubba" (Disney) (German Synchronization, Vocal)
- 2021: Hornbach Commercial (48K Studio) (Vocals)
- 2019: Lucas Rieger feat. Nico Santos - Unlove (From The Voice Of Germany) (Background Vocals, BV Arrangement)
- 2018: Alex Scuderi - I Feel The Same (Original Mixes)(ALIGN Records)(Single and Music Video)
- 2018: Alex Scuderi - I Feel The Same (Emotech Mixes)(ALIGN Records)(A&R, Producer, Arranger, Writer, Engineer)
- 2018: Rolf Roosalu - Show A Little Love(Eurovision Song Contest) (Background Vocals, BV Arrangement)
- 2017: Janne Tavi Feat. Robert Owens - The Other Man(Ibadan Records)(Vocal Production, Edit, Mix Engineer)
- 2017: SF9 - Jungle Game (Burning Sensation EP)(FNC ENTERTAINMENT, under license to Loen Entertainment Inc) (Writer)
- 2015: "Can’t Get You out of My Mind”- Meeco feat. Aaron Marcellus, Yahzarah, Ingrid Arthur, Andy Roda, Wanja Janeva, Shedrick Mitchell, Brad Allen Williams, Bryan Smith, David "DJ" Ginyard, Jermaine Parrish & Alan Plummer
- 2012: Julie Lindell - To Whom It May Concern (Background Vocals)
- 2011: Linda Andrews (singer) - Tænder Et Lys (Background Vocals, Arrangement)
- 2011: "Song for the Forgotten" (Producer, Arranger, Featured Vocalist) (Single feat. Various Artists)
- 2009: Thomas Helmig - Tommy Boy (Background Vocals)
- 1998: ADL - "Love Trippin" (Featured Vocalist)

== Awards and nominations ==
| Year | Nominee / work | Award | Result |
|---|---|---|---|
| 2021 | Best Professional Video | The International Film Festival Manhattan Silver Achievement Award (Artist / Director), Professional Category | Won |
| 2021 | Best Music Video | The International Film Festival Manhattan | Nominated |
| 2009 | Andy Roda | American Scandinavian Society Grant Awards | Won |
| 2008 | ASAP SupahDance (album produced by Roda) | 24K Dance Award | Won |
| 2000 | Andy Roda | Danmarks Radio P3 Pris (Best New Artist) | Nominated |
