= Bag Skyerne =

Single by Anne Gadegaard
- Released: 6 May 2013
- Recorded: 2012/13
- Genre: Pop
- Length: 3:49
- Label: Awake Music

Anne Gadegaard singles chronology
"Blah Blah" (2010)	"Bag Skyerne" (2013)	"Suitcase" (2015)

"Bag Skyerne" is a song by Danish singer and songwriter Anne Gadegaard. It was released as a digital download in Denmark on 6 May 2013 through Awake Music. The song peaked to number 10 on the Danish Singles Chart

== Music video ==
A music video to accompany the release of "Bag Skyerne" was first released onto YouTube on 9 May 2013 at a total length of three minutes and forty-nine seconds.

== Track listing ==
Digital download
No.	Title	Length
1.	"Bag Skyerne"	3:49

== Chart performance ==
=== Weekly charts ===
Chart (2013)	Peak position
Denmark (Tracklisten)	10

== Release history ==
Region	Date	Format	Label
Denmark	6 May 2013	Digital download	Awake Music
