= Finn Nørbygaard =

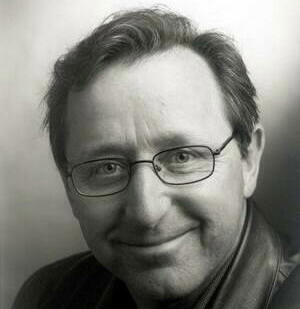
- Finn Nørbygaard in 2005
- Born: 8 March 1952; Esbjerg, Denmark
- Occupations: Psychotherapist, actor, entertainer, musician
- Website: noerbygaard.dk

Finn Nørbygaard (born 8 March 1952, Esbjerg) is a Danish actor, entertainer, musician and psychotherapist. Nørbygaard was originally educated as a school teacher but had his breakthrough in a TV role as a bus conductor with Jacob Haugaard wherein they popularized the regional expression Ja-dak. The pair also made the Jydekompagniet movies and acted in popular TV-commercials for Tuborg Squash. Another of Nørbygaards successes was the comedy/music show Musik og Fis in 1994 which he made with the singer Jette Torp. The show also became known as Finn og Jette Show.

Nørbygaard invested in JMI invest, the primary owner of IT Factory. When IT Factory collapsed, Nørbygaard lost about 250 million Danish kroner worth of investment. After the financial difficulties of the late 2000s, Nørbygaard has focused more on holding lectures and speeches about the ups and downs of his life. He has a seven year education in gestalt therapy and is practising as a psychotherapist. In relation to his therapeutic interests he has made a large number of radio interviews with famous Danes, known as Finnsk Terapi.

== Filmography ==
- Jydekompagniet (1988)
- Jydekompagniet 3 (1989)
- Springflod (1990)
- Finn Og Jacob – På Vejen Igen (1996)
- Skyggen (1998)
- Kærestesorger (2009)
- Den Sidste Rejse (2011)

=== TV shows ===
- Finn'sk fjernsyn (1999, 2001)
