= Niels Christian Meyer =

Danish TV host

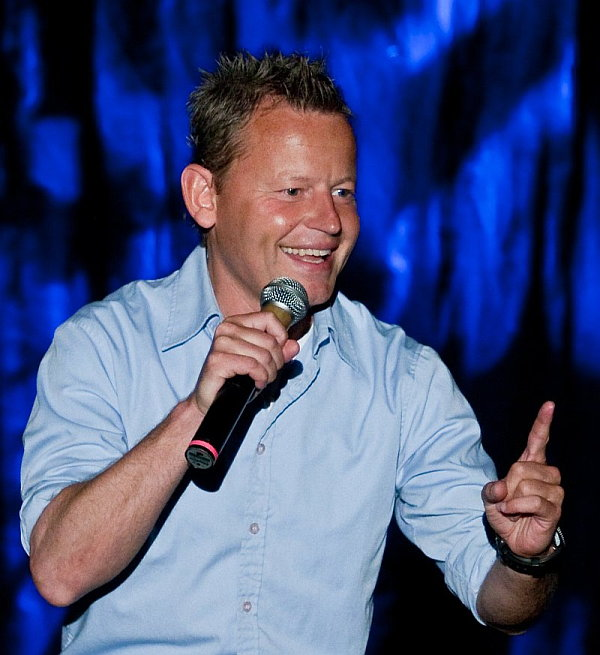
- Born: 11. December 1964; Hellerup, Denmark
- Other name: Bubber
- Children: 3
- Awards: Årets Otto 2005

Bubber (born Niels Christian Meyer) is a Danish television host born in December 1964. He is one of Denmark's most recognized TV hosts, and has hosted several shows. Bubber has won Årets Otto 2005
