= Arabiens Drøm =

Studio album by Anne Gadegaard
- Released: 19 September 2003
- Recorded: 2003
- Genre: Pop
- Label: Universal Music

Anne Gadegaard chronology
Arabiens Drøm (2003)	Ini Mini Miny (2004)

Singles from Arabiens Drøm
- 1. "Arabiens Drøm" Released: 2003; 2. "Jamaica" Released: 2003

Arabiens Drøm is the first studio album by the Danish singer Anne Gadegaard who was the representative of Denmark in the Junior Eurovision Song Contest 2003. The album takes its title from the song which was performed at the contest. It was also released in the same year. The album was quite successful in Denmark, although it was not released in the US or the UK. Two of the songs were released as singles, "Arabiens Drøm" followed by "Jamaica".

== Track listing ==
(titles in brackets are for translation purposes only)

1. Arabiens Drøm (Arabian Dream)
2. Festen (The Party)
3. Luis (Luis)
4. Min Bedste Ven (My Best Friend)
5. Jamaica (Jamaica)
6. Choco Og Nugga (Chocolate and Nougat)
7. Dine Øjne Blå (Your Blue Eyes)
8. Prinsesserne På Is (Princesses On Ice)
9. Mor Dig Godt (Have Fun)
10. Tju Tju Bang (Hey Hey Bang)
11. Danser Natten Lang (Dancing All Night Long)

== Chart performance ==
=== Weekly charts ===
Chart (2003)	Peak position
Danish Albums (Hitlisten)	4

== Release history ==
Region	Date	Format	Label
Denmark	19 September 2003	Digital download, CD	Universal Music
