= Hot Ones =

Internet web series

- Genre: Talk show
- Created by: Sean Evans; Chris Schonberger
- Presented by: Sean Evans
- Country of origin: United States
- Original language: English
- No. of seasons: 29
- No. of episodes: 399 (list of episodes)

Production
- Executive producers: Sean Evans; Sarah Honda
- Production companies: First We Feast; Complex Media (until 2024)

Original release
- Network: YouTube
- Release: March 12, 2015 – present

Hot Ones is an American YouTube talk show, created by Sean Evans and Chris Schonberger, hosted by Evans and produced by First We Feast and formerly Complex Media. Its basic premise involves celebrities being interviewed by Evans over a platter of increasingly spicy chicken wings. Several spin-offs have been produced, including the game show Hot Ones: The Game Show on the cable television network TruTV, and Truth or Dab, a truth or dare style competition that also airs on the First We Feast YouTube channel. Hot Ones is also a food brand as frozen chicken wings and hot sauces have been released under the Hot Ones brand based on sauces and flavors from the show. Hot Ones-branded Hot Pockets and Pringles have also been released.

As of August 7, 2025, the show has produced twenty-seven seasons (with three seasons per calendar year since 2018). Most seasons produce between 10 and 16 episodes, though prior to 2018 there were longer seasons consisting of more episodes; approximately 40 episodes air per year. Each season features a different line-up of hot sauces, though certain sauces remain from year-to-year, including three self-produced sauces, "Hot Ones – The Classic" in spot 1, "Hot Ones – Los Calientes" in either spot 4 or 5, and "Hot Ones – The Last Dab" as the final sauce. Since Season 2, "Da' Bomb Beyond Insanity" has occupied spot 8. Guests who do not complete the gauntlet of hot sauces are placed in the "Hall of Shame" or, beginning in Season 17, the "Wall-Most Made it."

The show has been nominated for several awards, winning two Streamy Awards and its host, Sean Evans, has been nominated for Daytime Emmy Award. In 2022, Hot Ones received a nomination for the Daytime Emmy Award for Outstanding Talk Show Entertainment. The show has been noted for its deep-probing questions, often digging up material from a celebrity's background not often discussed on other interview shows, with Hollywood Insider calling it "the hottest celebrity interview right now" in 2021.

== Format ==
The format involves Evans and his celebrity guests eating ten chicken wings (or a vegetarian/vegan alternative based on the guest's preference), each prepared with a progressively hotter hot sauce. Evans states the show's tagline at the beginning of each episode: "The show with hot questions, and even hotter wings."

The first sauce presented is relatively mild such as sriracha, which has a rating of 2,200 Scoville units. The final sauce (as of season 4), Hot Ones' own The Last Dab (The Last Dab Reduxx starting in season 6, The Last Dab XXX starting in Season 10, The Last Dab Apollo starting in season 13, and The Last Dab Xperience starting in season 22), has a Scoville rating of 2,000,000+. As per "tradition", the guests are encouraged to put a minuscule extra amount of The Last Dab on the final wing; they are told this is not required, but most guests opt to do so even when already struggling with the heat of the previous wings.

After each wing, Evans usually asks his guest an interview question, starting with easy "softball" questions. As the wings get hotter, the questions often become more deeply researched and personal, and the guest typically begins to display the effects of eating the spicier wings. If the guest struggles to finish the wings, the interview becomes less focused on the questions and more on the guest's reaction to the spice. The guests are furnished with whatever soothing condiments they think will counteract the effect of the wings, including glasses of water and milk as well as ice cream.

The standard show is Evans and one guest eating ten wings each. In some episodes there are two guests (such as the episodes featuring Keegan-Michael Key and Jordan Peele or Ryan Reynolds and Hugh Jackman, respectively). In a few episodes (mostly specials), five wings are presented instead of ten. To finish off, Evans encourage his guests to promote their upcoming projects. Guests who fail to finish all ten wings are added to the show's Hall of Shame.

== In other media ==
In 2021, Hot Ones appeared in a Saturday Night Live sketch featuring Maya Rudolph as Beyoncé, the guest eating spicy wings, and Mikey Day as Evans. Rudolph reprised the sketch in May 2024.

In 2022, Hot Ones appeared in the series Loot, with Evans interviewing the character Molly Wells, also portrayed by Rudolph, in the third episode of season 1. Hot Ones and Evans have also appeared in the films Happy Gilmore 2 (2025) and Verity (2026).

== Development ==
The show was created by First We Feast founder Christopher Schonberger. Schonberger cites Alexa Chung's quirky interview show Popworld as the inspiration for the show.

In 2017, First We Feast featured an episode of Sean in the Wild, using sauces from Hot Ones, starring Evans and Michael Stevens from Vsauce.

In 2024, the show was purchased from BuzzFeed for $82.5 million by an investment group that included Evans, Schonberger, Mythical Entertainment, Crooked Media, and George Soros.

The nineteenth episode of the fourth season featuring Mario Batali was removed in 2017 in light of the sexual misconduct allegations towards him. As of 2025, it remains the only episode removed.

Australian online TV platform 7plus added a linear Hot Ones channel in February 2025.

== Series overview ==
| Season | Episodes | Originally released | |
| Season | Episodes | First released | Last released |
|---|---|---|---|
| 1 | 8 | March 12, 2015 | October 22, 2015 |
| 2 | 40 | December 10, 2015 | December 22, 2016 |
| 3 | 24 | January 19, 2017 | June 29, 2017 |
| 4 | 24 | July 20, 2017 | December 28, 2017 |
| 5 | 16 | January 18, 2018 | May 3, 2018 |
| 6 | 13 | June 7, 2018 | September 6, 2018 |
| 7 | 12 | October 4, 2018 | December 20, 2018 |
| 8 | 12 | January 24, 2019 | April 11, 2019 |
| 9 | 13 | May 30, 2019 | September 5, 2019 |
| 10 | 12 | September 19, 2019 | December 5, 2019 |
| 11 | 9 | January 18, 2020 | April 9, 2020 |
| 12 | 10 | June 25, 2020 | August 27, 2020 |
| 13 | 11 | October 1, 2020 | December 10, 2020 |
| 14 | 12 | January 28, 2021 | April 15, 2021 |
| 15 | 12 | May 27, 2021 | August 12, 2021 |
| 16 | 14 | September 23, 2021 | December 23, 2021 |
| 17 | 12 | January 20, 2022 | April 7, 2022 |
| 18 | 12 | May 26, 2022 | August 11, 2022 |
| 19 | 12 | September 29, 2022 | December 22, 2022 |
| 20 | 12 | January 26, 2023 | April 13, 2023 |
| 21 | 12 | May 25, 2023 | August 10, 2023 |
| 22 | 12 | September 21, 2023 | December 7, 2023 |
| 23 | 13 | January 25, 2024 | April 18, 2024 |
| 24 | 13 | May 23, 2024 | August 23, 2024 |
| 25 | 14 | September 19, 2024 | December 5, 2024 |
| 26 | 13 | January 15, 2025 | April 10, 2025 |
| 27 | 13 | May 22, 2025 | August 7, 2025 |
| 28 | 12 | September 18, 2025 | December 4, 2025 |
| 29 | 13 | January 22, 2026 | April 13, 2026 |
| 30 | 16 | May 21, 2026 | September 14, 2026 |
| 31 | TBA | September 24, 2026 | TBA |

== Accolades ==
| Year | Award | Category | Nominee(s) | Result | Ref. |
|---|---|---|---|---|---|
| 2017 | Streamy Award | Best Food Series | Hot Ones | Nominated | |
| 2018 | Shorty Awards | Best Web Series | Hot Ones | Won | |
| 2018 | Streamy Award | Non-Fiction Series | Hot Ones | Won | |
| 2019 | Streamy Award | Show of the Year | Hot Ones | Nominated | |
| 2019 | Streamy Award | Pop Culture | Hot Ones | Won | |
| 2021 | Daytime Emmy Awards | Outstanding Entertainment Talk Show Host | Sean Evans | Nominated | |
| 2022 | Daytime Emmy Awards | Outstanding Entertainment Talk Show | Hot Ones | Nominated | |
| 2026 | Critics' Choice Television Awards | Best Talk Show | Hot Ones | Nominated | |

== Spin-offs ==
On February 18, 2020, a short-lived spin-off titled Hot Ones: The Game Show premiered on truTV. Hosted by Evans, the series pitted two teams of players against one another for a chance to win up to $25,000 and be able to drink ice-cold milkshakes in a competition that involved both trivia and eating wings cooked in increasingly hotter sauces. The show ended on September 15, 2020 after one season.

On January 31, 2024, First We Feast launched Hot Ones Versus on YouTube. The spin-off features guests asking each other difficult questions and playing a variety of games to avoid eating The Last Dab.

In June 2026, Netflix ordered Hot Ones: Extra Heat, a spin-off hosted by Sean Evans. Unlike the original series, which continues to release weekly episodes on the First We Feast YouTube channel, the spin-off films on location at Netflix tentpole events. Its first episode was set to premiere on July 13, 2026.

== Adaptations ==
Hot Ones has been adapted in various countries and languages. In 2022, Studio Bagel and Canal+ purchased the rights to adapt the show in France, where the name of the series remains the same: Hot Ones. In 2024, Hot Ones Italia was created in Italy where the show is broadcast on RaiPlay and later the same year Hot Ones Québec in Quebec on Vidéotron. In 2025, Hot Ones Germany was created for the German audience with Uber Eats as the main sponsor.
