= Anti Social Media =

Danish pop rock band

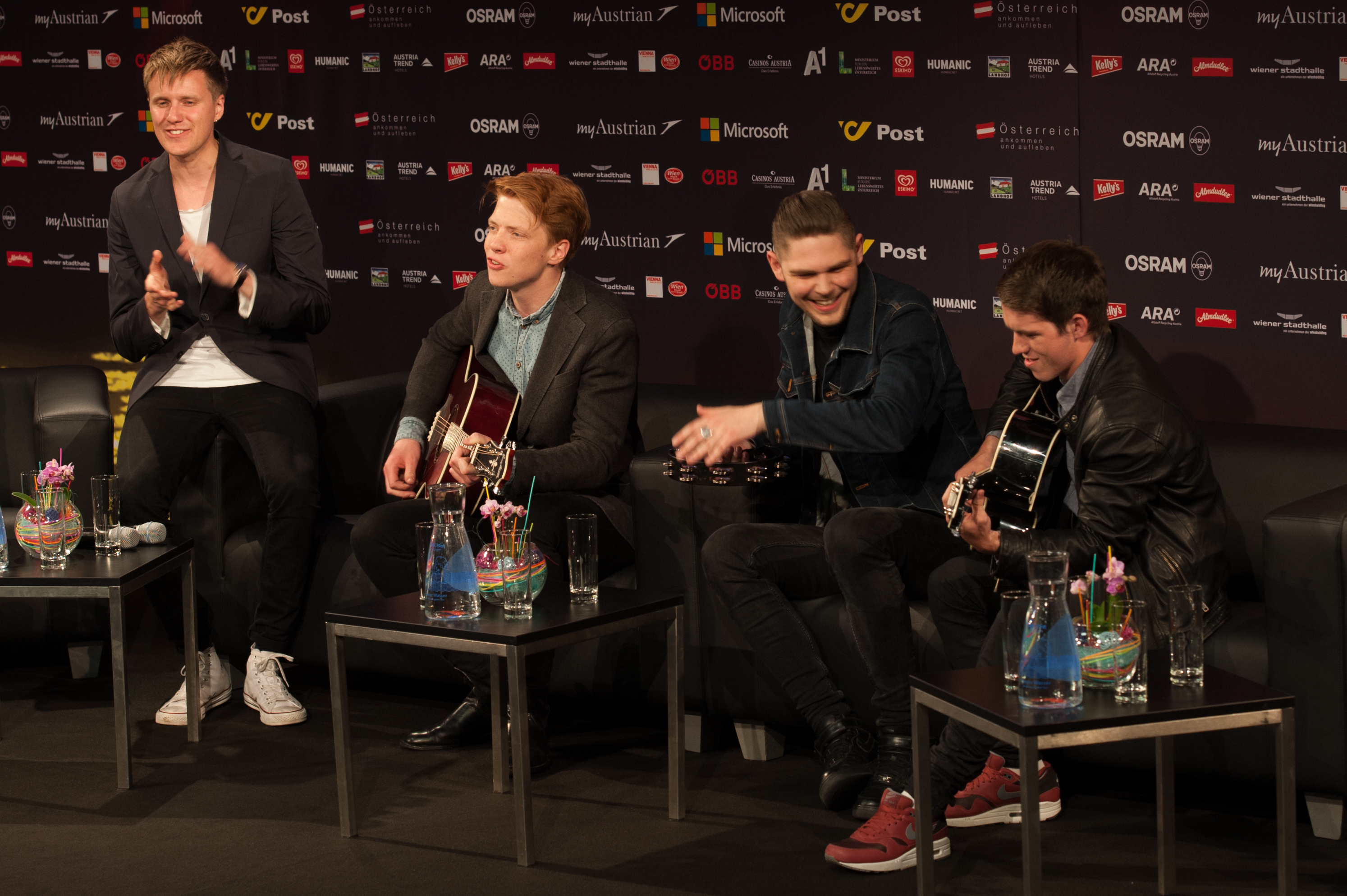
- Anti Social Media in 2015 (L-R: David Vang, Philip Thornhill, Emil Vissing, and Nikolaj Tøth)

Background information
- Origin: Denmark
- Genres: Pop rock
- Years active: 2014–2015
- Labels: RE:A:CH
- Members: Philip Thornhill; Nikolaj Tøth; David Vang; Emil Vissing

Anti Social Media was a Danish pop rock band that represented Denmark in the Eurovision Song Contest 2015 with the song "The Way You Are". The group consists of Philip Thornhill, Nikolaj Tøth, David Vang and Emil Vissing.

== Career ==
=== 2015: Eurovision Song Contest ===
In 2015, Anti Social Media was announced as one of the ten competing musicians in Dansk Melodi Grand Prix 2015 with the song "The Way You Are". On 7 February 2015 Anti Social Media performed the song and won the Dansk Melodi Grand Prix to represent Denmark at the Eurovision Song Contest 2015. On 4 May 2015 Anti Social Media released the single "More Than a Friend". On 11 May 2015 they released their debut EP The Way. At the Eurovision Song Contest 2015 they performed during the first Semi-final on 19 May 2015, they failed to qualify for the final. This was the first time since 2007 that Denmark had failed to qualify to the final. The band disbanded shortly afterwards.

== Members ==
- Philip Thornhill (10 June 1995) – vocals
- Nikolaj Tøth (17 September 1995) – guitar
- David Vang (22 November 1989) – bass
- Emil Vissing (26 October 1990) – drums

== Discography ==
=== Extended plays ===
Title	Details
The Way	Released: 11 May 2015; Label: RE:A:CH; Format: Digital download

=== Singles ===
Title	Year	Peak chart positions		Album
Title	Year	DEN	ICE	Album
"The Way You Are"	2015	38	55	The Way
"More Than a Friend"	2015	—	—	The Way
"Fire Exit"	2015	—	—	The Way
"—" denotes a single that did not chart or was not released.

Awards and achievements
Preceded by Basim with "Cliché Love Song"	Denmark in the Eurovision Song Contest; 2015	Succeeded by Lighthouse X with "Soldiers of Love"
