= Jette Torp =

Danish singer (born 1964)

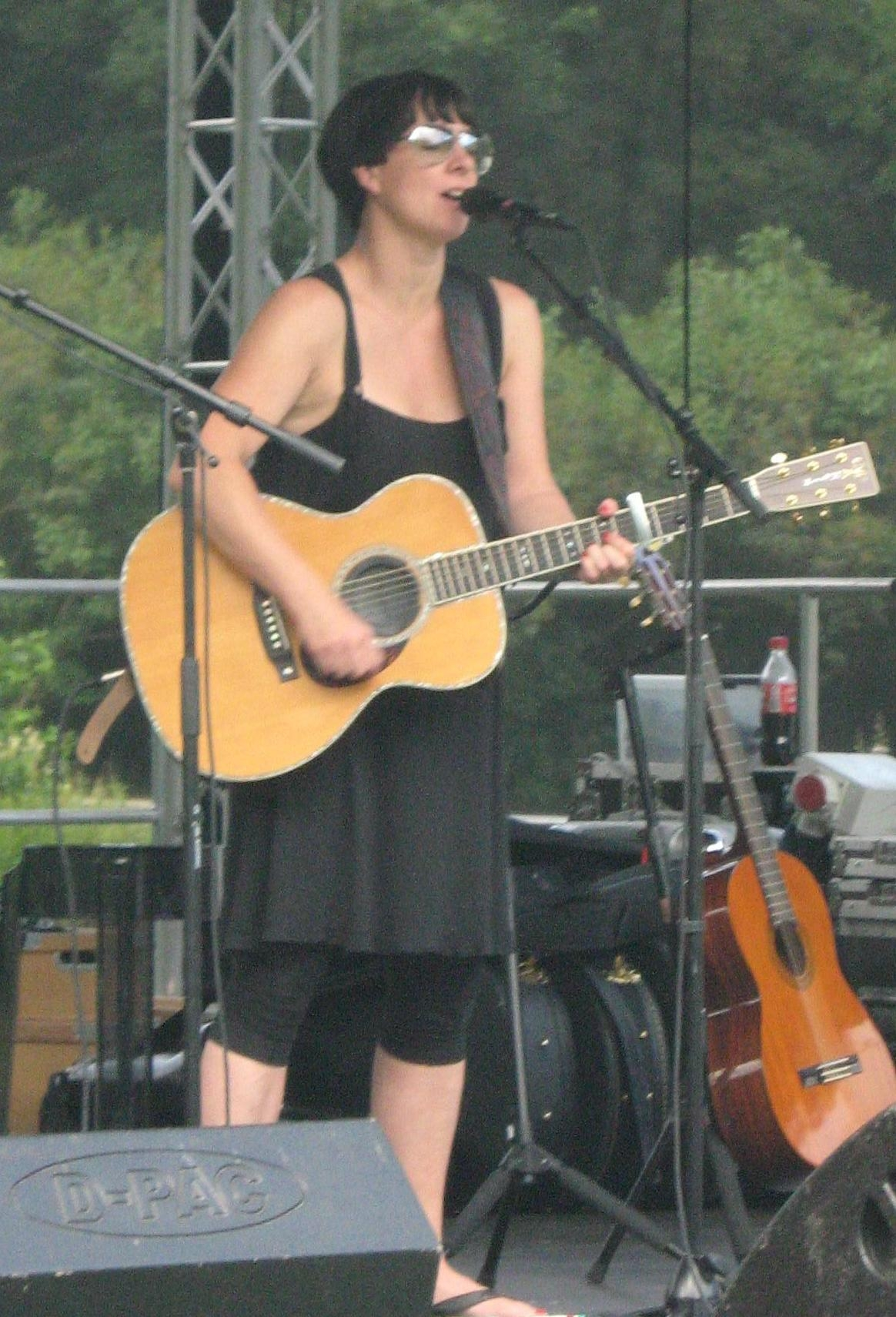
- Jette Torp, Liselund, July 2010

Background information
- Born: 16 December 1964 (age 61); Frederiksberg, Copenhagen, Denmark
- Education: Århus University; Royal Academy of Music in Aarhus
- Genres: Pop
- Years active: 1988–present
- Spouse: Claus Pilgaard (m. 2004; div. 2015)

Jette Torp (born 16 December 1964) is a Danish singer and entertainer. Born in Frederiksberg, Copenhagen, the family moved to Ry near Skanderborg in Jutland when she was five years old.

She studied music first at Århus University then at Royal Academy of Music in Aarhus.

== Career ==
Her career started with the trio Dirty Dolls where she worked for several years before going solo. In 1994, together with Finn Nørbygaard, she took part in the Musik & Fis show which was a resounding success. In 1995, toured Denmark with her musicshow and soon started a collaboration with Kurt Ravn, a well-known Danish singer and actor.

In 1997 she was contacted by the writer Ivar Lind Greiner who needed a singer for his song "Utopia" that was one of the 10 songs that should be in the Danish Melodi Grand Prix contest. She was placed second in the contest but she also succeeded in getting to know music director Jan Glaesel which soon led to her first album "Here I Am". After another tour, she put together her own band with whom she produced her next album "New Tracks" in 2001. The successful musician and songwriter Jan Kaspersen was now participating actively in her work.

In late 2002, "New Tracks" was followed by another album in the New Country style, "Snowflakes in Fire". In May 2003, Jette Torp and her band put on a rather special show at the Colosseum Theatre in Frederikshavn which was about to close. With musicians Jan Kaspersen, Klaus Lorenzen, Kristian Fogh, Kristian Kold and Lars Wagner, the show was recorded by TV2, leading to a new release, the "Past the Point of Rescue" album. In 2007, Jette Torp recorded her first solo album in Danish, "MikrofonSangerinde".

== Personal life ==
In 2004, Torp married entertainer Claus Pilgaard, better known as Chili Klaus, known for eating extremely spicy peppers on TV and online. In 2015, they split after 11 years of marriage.

== Discography ==
Jette Torp's website lists the following albums:

- Here I Am (1997)
- What if I do (1999)
- New Tracks (2001)
- Snowflakes in Fire (2002)
- Past the point of rescue (2003)
- MikrofonSangerinde (2007)
- Der er ingenting i verden så stille som sne (2009)
- Close to You (2011)
