= Sean Evans (interviewer) =

American YouTuber (born 1986)

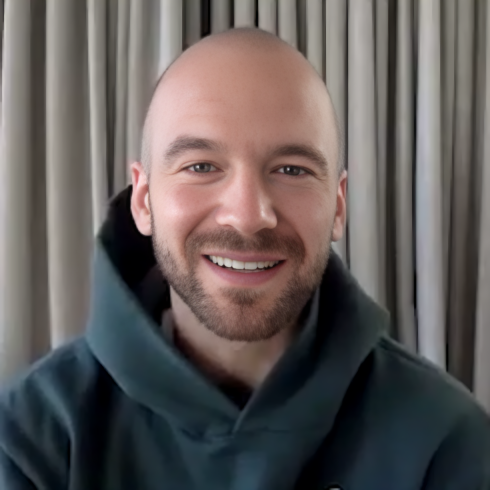
- Evans in 2021
- Born: April 26, 1986 (age 40); Evanston, Illinois, U.S.
- Education: University of Illinois, Urbana-Champaign (BA)
- Occupations: YouTuber, producer
- Years active: 2014–present

Sean Christopher Evans (born April 26, 1986) is an American YouTuber who is best known for co-creating the series Hot Ones, which he has hosted since 2015, in which he interviews celebrities as they eat progressively spicier chicken wings. The series has been nominated for two Daytime Emmy Awards. In July 2025, Evans was named in Time magazine's inaugural “TIME100 Creators” list - branded by the publication as the 100 most influential digital voices.

== Early life and education ==
Sean Evans was born in the Chicago suburb of Evanston to Michael Evans and Donna Arthofer. He has a brother named Gavin. Evans is a 2004 graduate of Crystal Lake Central High School, where he played football and baseball. He graduated from the University of Illinois Urbana–Champaign in 2008 with a Bachelor of Arts degree in broadcast journalism, where a professor suggested he become a weatherman. He served as a Radio Personality and news broadcast journalist on WPGU-FM in college. He grew up looking up to the interviewing prowess of Howard Stern, Jimmy Kimmel, David Letterman, and Adam Carolla. One of his earliest memories, he says, is his father taping Letterman during the week and binge-watching them all on a Saturday.

== Career ==
=== Early career ===
Before working as an interviewer, Evans was a copywriter for the Chicago tourism board. During that time, he freelanced for Complex Magazine, doing on-screen interviews with celebrities such as 2 Chainz and Steph Curry in New Orleans. Complex liked his interviews and offered him a full-time job, so he quit his copywriting job and moved to New York a month later.

=== Hot Ones ===
Evans is the host of Hot Ones, which he co-created with Chris Schonberger, the General Manager of First We Feast, the former Complex Media property that produces the show. Hot Ones' tagline is, "It's the show with hot questions, and even hotter wings", and Evans repeats it in the intro to each episode. New episodes normally come out Thursdays at 11 a.m. ET.

The idea for Hot Ones sprang from a meeting in which Evans and Schonberger were brainstorming ways to create a fresh take on the celebrity interview. In a 2022 Vanity Fair profile about Evans, Schonberger described the initial discussions about a hot wing interview show: "I just thought it was funny ... Then we kind of saw this magic happen in the room". Evans and Schonberger realized that the concept carried an added feature: the hot sauce helped break down guests' inhibitions and encouraged them to set aside the usual late night TV-style talking points. Evans has said, "Celebrity is so unobtainable by definition, you know. But what's more common man than dying on hot sauce?"

The format of the show, which regularly amasses millions of views per episode on YouTube, involves Evans and his guest eating 10 chicken wings, or vegan substitutes, each doused in a different hot sauce that is spicier than the one before it. In each season of the show, the lineup of hot sauces changes, with the exception of the eighth wing (Da Bomb Beyond Insanity) and the 10th wing (The Last Dab, a sauce created by Hot Ones and the Brooklyn-based hot sauce company Heatonist). The term "the last dab" refers to the show's tradition of Evans and his guest "dabbing" each final wing with an extra dollop of the namesake sauce.

Evans has interviewed hundreds of celebrities, including Shaquille O'Neal, Conan O'Brien, Ed Sheeran, Justin Timberlake, Cate Blanchett, Jennifer Lawrence, Billie Eilish, Matt Damon, Kevin Hart, Paul Rudd, Kristen Stewart, Gordon Ramsay, Jason Bateman, Post Malone, Dua Lipa, Neil deGrasse Tyson, Joji, Scarlett Johansson, Noel Gallagher, Salma Hayek, Daniel Radcliffe, Peter Griffin, Donald Duck and Jimmy Kimmel among others. Evans' episode, in 2019, with Paul Rudd spawned the meme, "Look at us. Who would have thought? Not me."

Other videos for First We Feast include teaming up with Chili Klaus, another spicy food internet personality, to eat a Carolina Reaper pepper, a record-breaking chili pepper (1,569,300 Scovilles) grown by chili pepper guru Smokin' Ed Currie. Evans and Klaus reunited to eat the pepper a second time, that time while riding on a horse carriage in Central Park.

In 2020, Evans began hosting Hot Ones: The Game Show, a trivia game show based on Hot Ones that aired on TruTV.

In 2021, Mikey Day impersonated Evans in a Saturday Night Live sketch where Maya Rudolph plays Beyoncé in a spoof episode of Hot Ones and ends up having a meltdown due to not being able to handle the spiciness. A year later, in June 2022, Evans did a cameo as himself in an episode of Apple TV+ show Loot, where the main character, also played by Rudolph, does the Hot Ones interview and ends up having a meltdown due to not being able to handle the spiciness.

On May 25, 2021, Evans was nominated for the Daytime Emmy Award for Outstanding Entertainment Talk Show Host at the 48th Daytime Emmy Awards. He has won internet entertainment awards including the Shorty, the Lovie, and the Webby. Evans has appeared on Good Morning America, The Tonight Show Starring Jimmy Fallon, Jimmy Kimmel Live!, The Late Show with Stephen Colbert, The Kelly Clarkson Show and The View.

In a 2021 interview with Esquire, Evans addressed the future of the show this way: "I do feel in some ways closer to the end of it than the beginning. We have been doing it for a long time and I'm not sure there's anything that I'm leaving on the table. Hot Ones has already done 10 laps around any expectation that I ever had for it ... So it's in a spot where I'm just doing something that I really enjoy doing. So I'm committed to Hot Ones for as long as the fans will allow it."

In December 2024, First We Feast was purchased from BuzzFeed for US$82.5 million by an investment group that included Evans, Schonberger, Mythical Entertainment, Crooked Media, and Soros Fund Management.

== Sources ==
- Evans, Sean interviews 2 Chainz (February 19, 2014). 2 Chainz Kicks Game About His New Adidas Sneaker Deal (YouTube). Complex News.
- Evans, Sean Interviewee (March 3, 2017). "Hi! I'm Sean Evans, host of First We Feast's Hot Ones on the YouTube. Ask me anything!". Reddit IAMA.
- Harris, Jenn (October 20, 2016). "This guy eats hot wings with celebrities for a living. Seriously". Los Angeles Times.
- Irish Examiner (October 11, 2016). "Kevin Hart might have the funniest Hot Ones interview yet". Irish Examiner. Archived from the original on November 23, 2016.
- Lynch, Kevin (November 19, 2013). "Confirmed: Smokin Ed's Carolina Reaper sets new record for hottest chilli". Guinness World Records.
- Nsubuga, Jimmy (December 6, 2015). "Watch these two guys eating the hottest pepper in the world – it looks like torture". Metro.
