= First We Feast =

Online food-culture magazine and YouTube channel

- Website type: Online food-culture magazine
- Available in: English
- Founded: 2012
- Country of origin: United States of America
- Owners: Soros Fund Management, Sean Evans, Chris Schonberger
- Founder: Chris Schonberger
- CEO: Chris Schonberger
- Key people: Sean Evans (CCO)
- Website: firstwefeast.com
- Commercial: Yes
- Current status: Active

First We Feast is an online food-culture magazine and YouTube channel. The site co-produces the YouTube series Hot Ones. The company began as off-shoot of Complex Media, its parent company until 2024. In 2024, BuzzFeed sold Complex to NTWRK, an e-commerce company backed by Live Nation Entertainment and Main Street Advisors, but retained First We Feast. Shortly after, in December 2024, the company was sold by BuzzFeed to a group of investors, including Soros Fund Management, Sean Evans, and founder Chris Schonberger for $82.5 million.

== Description ==
First We Feast began in 2012 as a food culture blog edited by Chris Schonberger, who had formerly worked for TONY. The blog was an off-branch of Complex magazine. The website gained a measure of popularity, and began to incorporate interviews and cooking guides into its website. In 2014 the website launched its YouTube channel, which produces a number of food-related video series, most notably Hot Ones (hosted by Sean Evans), The Curry Shop, The Burger Show (hosted by Alvin Cailan) and Burger Scholar Sessions (hosted by George Motz).
