= Melodi Grand Prix Junior =

Norwegian television song competition

- Genre: Music competition
- Country of origin: Norway
- Original languages: Norwegian (main); Sami (secondary)

Production
- Running time: Varies

Original release
- Network: NRK
- Release: February 23, 2002 – May 28, 2022
- Release: 2027

Related
- Junior Eurovision Song Contest; MGP Nordic; MGP Junior (Danish TV series); Lilla Melodifestivalen

Melodi Grand Prix Junior, also spelled as MGPjr, is a Norwegian television song competition for aspiring singers between the ages of 8 and 15 that was held annually between 2002 and 2022. The competing songs are written by the participants themselves and are sung primarily in Norwegian, and on several occasions, there were songs in Northern Sami, another language of Norway.

Many past winners went on to become stars, such as 2002's Nicolay Ramm, 2005's Malin Reitan, 2007's Celine Helgemo, 2009's Jørgen Dahl Moe, 2012's Marcus & Martinus, 2014's Mathea-Mari Glittenberg, and 2017's Oselie Henden.

== History ==
The idea was taken from the Danish broadcaster Danmarks Radio, who launched a song contest for aspiring singers aged 8 to 15 in spring 2000. The format was a success and caught the attention of Norway and Sweden in 2002.

From 2003 to 2005, the contest used to select the Norwegian entry for the Junior Eurovision Song Contest (JESC). In 2006 Norway withdrew from the contest to participate in MGP Nordic and the contest used to select the entry for the Scandinavian counterpart until 2009. MGPjr is still held annually, but it's not used to select an entry for any contest. Shortly after Junior Eurovision 2021, NRK revealed that a delegation was sent to Paris to watch how much the contest evolved, raising questions about a possible return in 2022.

A few days after the 2022 edition of MGPjr ended, NRK announced that the format would likely be put on hold for at least a year. After not being held between 2023 and 2026, in June 2026, NRK confirmed that MGPjr would be revived in 2027.

== Presenters ==
- Thomas Numme (2002)
- Stian Barsnes-Simonsen (2002–08)
- Nadia Hasnaoui (2004–06)
- Kåre Magnus Bergh (2009–10)
- Marthe Sveberg Bjørstad (2009)
- Ingrid Gjessing Linhave (2010, 2016)
- Margrethe Røed (2011–15)
- Alex Rosén (2011)
- Tooji (2012–14)
- Nicolay Ramm (2016–17)
- Mikkel Niva (2017–19)
- Sigrid Velle Dypbukt (2018–19)
- Selma Ibrahim Karlsen (2020–22)
- Victor Sotberg (2020–21)
- Tonje Gilje (2027)
- Martin Lilleberg (2027)

== Winners ==
Year	Date	Venue	Artist	Real Name(s)	Song (translation)	Other contests
2002	February 23	Oslo Spektrum	To små karer	Nicolay Ramm, Christoffer B. Claussen	"Paybacktime"	MGP Nordic 2002
2003	September 6	Oslo Spektrum	2U	Charlot Daysh, Joakim Harestad Haukaas	"Sinnsykt gal forelsket" (Crazy in love)	Junior Eurovision Song Contest 2003
2004	June 12	Oslo Spektrum	@lek	Aleksander Moberg	"En stjerne skal jeg bli" (I'm gonna be a star)	Junior Eurovision Song Contest 2004
2005	May 28	Oslo Spektrum	Malin	Malin Reitan	"Sommer og skolefri" (Summer and school free)	Junior Eurovision Song Contest 2005
2006	April 22	Oslo Spektrum	Ole Runar	Ole Runar Gillebo	"Fotball e supert" (Football is super)	MGP Nordic 2006
2007	June 2	Oslo Spektrum	Celine	Celine Helgemo	"Bæstevænna" (Best friends)	MGP Nordic 2007
2008	September 5	Oslo Spektrum	The BlackSheeps	Agnete Johnsen, Emelie Nilsen, Alexander Touryguin, Viktoria Eriksen	"Oro jaska, beana" (Be quiet/Shut up, dog)	MGP Nordic 2008
2009	September 5	Oslo Spektrum	Jørgen	Jørgen Dahl Moe	"Din egen vei" (Your own way)	MGP Nordic 2009
2010	September 4	Oslo Spektrum	Torstein	Torstein Snekvik	"Svikter aldri igjen" (Never let you down again)	
2011	September 3	Oslo Spektrum	Sval	Sval Rosenløw Eeg	"Trenger deg" (Need you)	
2012	September 1	Oslo Spektrum	Marcus & Martinus	Marcus Gunnarsen, Martinus Gunnarsen	"To dråper vann" (Two drops of water)	
2013	August 31	Oslo Spektrum	Unik 4	Audun Rørmark, Simen Bakkåker, Annika Momrak, Eline Nesje	"Så sur da" (So mad)	
2014	August 30	Oslo Spektrum	Mathea-Mari	Mathea-Mari Glittenberg	"#online"	
2015	November 7	Oslo Spektrum	Thea	Thea Floer Kulseng	"Du gjør mæ så gla" (You make me so happy)	
2016	November 5	Oslo Spektrum	Vilde & Anna	Vilde Hjelle, Anna Naustdal	"Vestlandet" (Western nation)	
2017	November 4	Telenor Arena	Oselie	Oselie Henden	"Verda vår" (Our world)	
2018	November 3	Telenor Arena	4everU	Eline Roa Gran, Savannah Løver, Maria Elisabeth Heitmann, Bettina Ranvik	"Forandring" (Change)	
2019	May 25	Telenor Arena	Anna & Emma	Anna Vestreheim, Emma H. Ylvisåker	"Kloden er syk" (The world is sick)	
2020	August 22	Oslo Spektrum	Hennika	Hennika Eggum Huuse	"Kan ikke la deg gå" (Can't let you go)	
2021	May 29	Oslo Spektrum	Josefine & Oskar	Josefine Westgaard, Oskar Armandus Høgetveit	"Smitte deg med glede" (Infect yourself with joy)	
2022	May 28	Telenor Arena	William	William Alexander Høyem Ribe	"Tusen tanker" (A thousand thoughts)	
2027	Upcoming edition					

== See also ==
- MGP Junior, Denmark's national MGP competition
- Lilla Melodifestivalen, Sweden's national MGP competition
- MGP Nordic, extinct pan-Scandinavian competition
- Junior Eurovision Song Contest, pan-European competition
