= MGP Junior (Danish TV series) =

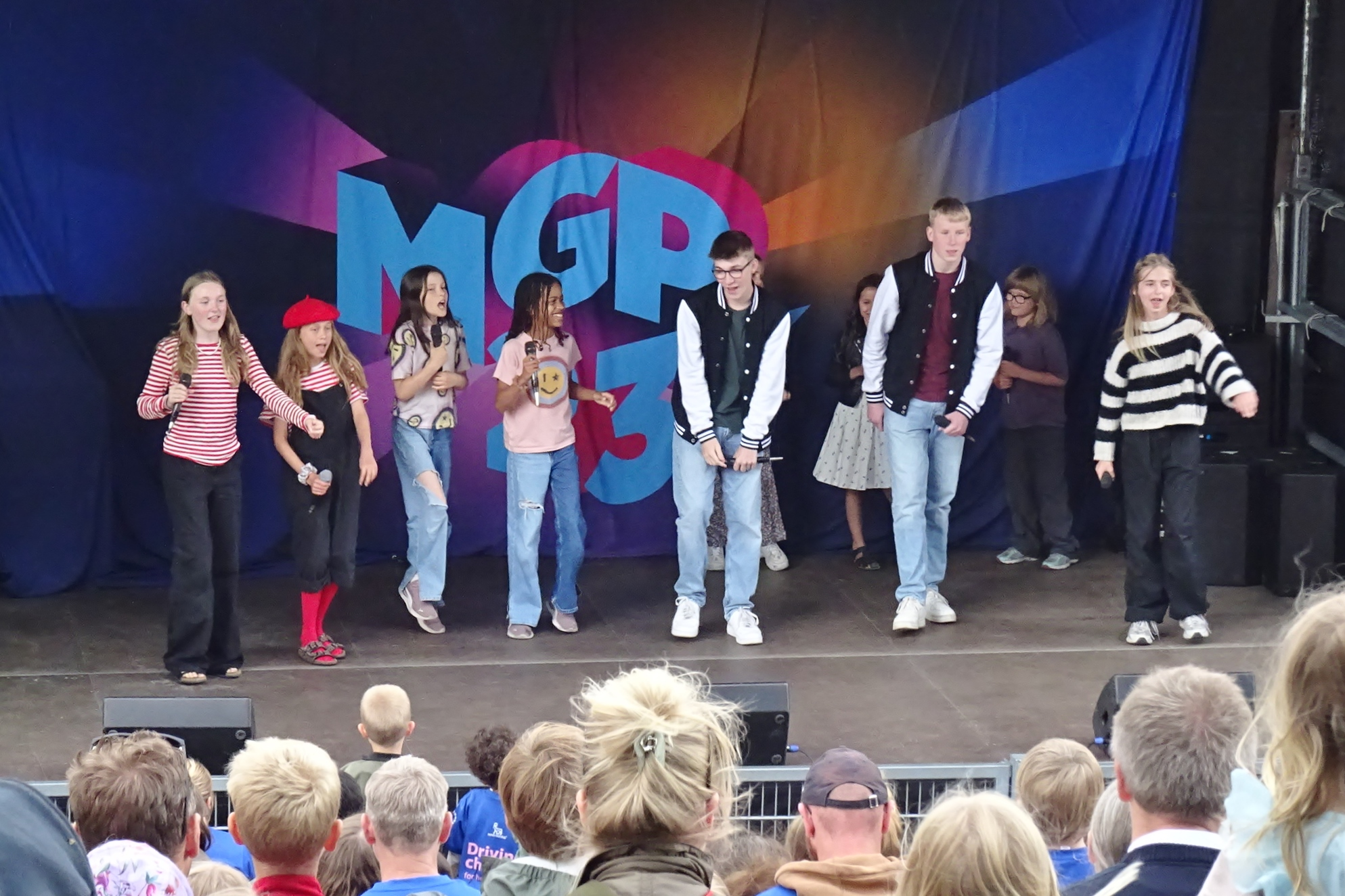
- Some of the participants in MGP 2023.
- Genre: Music competition
- Country of origin: Denmark
- Original language: Danish

Production
- Running time: Varies

Original release
- Network: DR
- Release: 13 April 2000 – present

Related
- Junior Eurovision Song Contest; Melodi Grand Prix Junior; Lilla Melodifestivalen

MGP Junior (standing for Melodi Grand Prix) is a Danish song contest for children aged 8 to 15. It originated in 2000 as a spin-off of Dansk Melodi Grand Prix, before coming the national selection for the now-extinct MGP Nordic in 2002 and from 2006 to 2009. From 2003 to 2005, MGP Junior was Denmark's national selection for the Junior Eurovision Song Contest, a pan-European version of the format.

The songs are performed primarily in Danish and written by the participants themselves. Many past contestants have gone on to be renowned recording artists, such as 2002's Morten Fillipsen, 2003's Anne Gadegaard, and 2014's Emma Pi Hedeboe.

== History ==
MGP was first held in 2000 under the name Børne1erens Melodi Grand Prix, but starting 2001, it was changed to the present name MGP (short for Melodi Grand Prix) but not to be confused with Dansk Melodi Grand Prix, a competition for adult singers to qualify for the Eurovision Song Contest.

In 2002, the idea of MGP for Juniors caught on in other Scandinavian countries and became a pan-Scandinavian Nordic competition under the name MGP Nordic with national selections in Sweden and Norway in addition to the existing Danish MGP (Junior) selection.

In 2003, MGP became even greater, with the EBU holding a European Song Contest at Forum in Copenhagen on 15 November 2003. It was named the Junior Eurovision Song Contest.

In 2006, Denmark, Sweden and Norway opted out of the pan-European contest and MGP Nordic resumed. They said their withdrawal from the pan-European competition was in protest to treatment of the competitors in the European version.

In 2007 membership for MGP Nordic expanded to include Finland. In 2010, Denmark's MGP Junior was not held after Sweden pulled out and instead sent their winner to the Junior Eurovision Song Contest. DR eventually revived MGP (Junior) in early 2011 and is nowadays held a week before or after the regular Dansk Melodi Grand Prix.

== Presenters ==
- Camilla Ottesen (2000–2003)
- Peter Palshøj (2000)
- Vera (2000)
- René Dif (2001)
- Gordon Kennedy (2002–2003)
- Nikolaj Kirk (2002)
- Mads Lindemann (2004)
- Christine Milton (2004)
- Jacob Riising (2005, 2008, 2012–2013, 2021)
- Bruno (2006–2008)
- Signe Lindkvist (2006)
- Jeppe Vig Find (2007)
- Mikkel Kryger Rasmussen (2009)
- Sofie Linde Lauridsen (2009, 2014–2015)
- Peter Mygind (2011)
- Sofie Lassen-Kahlke (2012)
- Szhirley (2013)
- Ole Thestrup (2013)
- Martin Brygmann (2014)
- Søren Rasted (2015)
- Joakim Ingversen (2014 (Note: For the 2014 contest, Joakim only hosted in the greenroom. He was a main host for the next two years.)–2016, 2019–2020)
- Sofie Østergaard (2016–2017)
- Barbara Moleko (2017)
- Mette Lindberg (2018)
- Kristian Gintberg (2018, 2020)
- Silja Okking (2019)
- Anna Lin (2021–2022)
- Stephania Potalivo (2022–2023)
- Jonas Madsen (2023–2025)
- Onkel Reje (2024)
- Sælma Alakhir (2025–present)
- Maria Helander (2026–present)

== Winners of Danish MGP ==
Year	Date	Venue	Artist	Real Name(s)	Song (translation)	Other contests
2000	April 13	TV-Byen, Søborg	FemininuM	Michala Iben Riis-Vestergaard, Freja Eva Lockenwitz	"Sort sort snak" (Black black talk)	
2001	April 7	TV-Byen, Søborg	Sisse Marie	Sisse Marie Holzmann Søby	"Du har brug for mig" (You need me)	
2002	March 23	TV-Byen Studio 3, Copenhagen	Razz	Rasmus Ott	"Kickflipper" (Kickflipping)	MGP Nordic 2002
2003	May 3	TV-Byen Studio 3, Copenhagen	Anne Gadegaard	Anne Mondrup Gadegaard Jensen	"Arabiens drøm" (Arabian dream)	Junior Eurovision Song Contest 2003
2004	September 25	TV-Byen Studio 3, Copenhagen	Cool Kids	Ibrahim Chouqeir, Niki Popovic, Caroline Forsberg Thybo	"Pigen er min" (The girl is mine)	Junior Eurovision Song Contest 2004
2005	September 17	DR Studio, Aarhus	Nicolai	Nicolai Kielstrup	"Shake, Shake, Shake"	Junior Eurovision Song Contest 2005
2006	September 16	DR Studio, Aarhus	SEB	Sebastian Øberg Nielsen, Tim Braüner, Thomas Drachmann Danielsen	"Tro på os to" (Believe in us)	MGP Nordic 2006
2007	September 15	DR Studio, Aarhus	Amalie	Amalie Høegh	"Til solen står op" (Until the sun rises)	MGP Nordic 2007
2008	September 20	Musikhuset, Aarhus	The Johanssons	Mattias Johansson, Marcus Johansson	"En for alle, alle for en" (One for all, all for one)	MGP Nordic 2008
2009	September 26	DR Studio, Aarhus	Pelle B	Pelle Blarke, Freja Bertel	"Kun min" (Only mine)	MGP Nordic 2009
2011	March 5	Ballerup Super Arena, Ballerup	Chestnut Avenue	Nichlas Paasch, Malthe Deichmann Duckert	"Tro på dig selv" (Believe in yourself)	
2012	January 28	Gigantium, Aalborg	Energy	Sarah Katrine Dennig Simonsen, Lea Cecilie Dennig Simonsen, Aksel Lai Thomasbjerg	"Jeg bli'r ved" (I'll keep going)	
2013	February 2	Jyske Bank Boxen, Herning	Kristian	Kristian Dahlgård Mikkelsen	"Den første autograf" (The first autograph)	
2014	March 15	Arena Fyn, Odense	Emma Pi	Emma Pi Hedeboe	"Du ser den anden vej" (You see the other way)	
2015	February 14	Gigantium, Aalborg	Flora Ofelia	Flora Ofelia Hofmann Lindahl	"Du du du" (You, you, you)	
2016	February 20	Forum, Horsens	Ida & Lærke	Ida Helena Karmisholt, Lærke Ohm Sauer	"Bar' for vildt" (Too wild)	
2017	March 4	Jyske Bank Boxen, Herning	Bastian	Bastian Lars Andreasen	"Frikvarter" (Free time)	
2018	February 17	Gigantium, Aalborg	Mille	Mille Liendgaard	"Til næste år" (Until next year)	
2019	March 2	Jyske Bank Boxen, Herning	SODA	Dagmar Gad Foss, Sofie Øveraas Broe-Andersen	"Bedste veninder" (Best friends)	
2020	February 29	Royal Arena, Copenhagen	Liva	Liva Guldberg Schrøder	"Ingen plan B" (No plan B)	
2021	February 27	DR Byen, Copenhagen (Note: The venue was empty due to the COVID-19 pandemic.)	Emilie	Emilie Søgaard Bøge	"Ikke som de andre piger" (Not like the other girls)	
2022	February 26	Jyske Bank Boxen, Herning	Emma	Emma Lihle Thomsen	"Hater"	
2023	February 18	Næstved Arena, Næstved	Sophia	Sophia Cederqvist Stege	"Det' bare tanker" (It's just thoughts)	
2024	February 24	DR Koncerthuset, Copenhagen	Naya	Naya Mathilde Kjærsgaard Valen	"STOP!" (N/A)	
2025	February 22	Jyske Bank Boxen, Herning	Tempo	Bastian Tang Løvgreen, Felix Benjnouh Schultz, Jaden Alex Antonio Varela, Noah Alexander Radulovic Nielsen	"Lyst til at Hop'" (Want to Jump')	
2026	February 21	Arena Nord, Frederikshavn	Anna Frida	Anna Frida Kjærsgaard Hjeresen	"Ligeglad, ligeglad'" (Don't care, don't care)	
2027	February 20	Upcoming edition				

== MGP album series ==
(Winning song in bold)

The MGP organization has released compilation albums for many years. Many of these album releases have made it to the top of the Danish Albums Chart.

=== MGP 2000 ===
- Original title: Børne1erens Melodi Grand Prix
- Track list
1. 4x tabere – "Vi fører os frem"
2. Sandra Elsfort – "Chicoolar"
3. **FeminimuM – "Sort sort snak"**
4. Cecilie Jensen – "Du tog det hele fra mig"
5. SIXPACK – "Gone"

=== MGP 2001 ===
- Full title: MGP 2001: De unges Melodi Grand Prix (back cover)
- Track list
1. Three In One – "Du Kan Sige Ja-Ja"
2. Tøsepigerne – "Ti Amo"
3. Shit Kid – "Når Vi Sparker Biiip"
4. Hope – "Den Første Store Kærlighed"
5. Bips'n Chips – "Computersangen"
6. Krate – "Drømmeland"
7. Cocktail – "Uma Ma"
8. Michelle Siel – "Himlen Danser Sort"
9. Zabian Zoul – "Du Er Min Kærlighed"
10. **Sisse – "Du Har Brug For Mig"**

=== MGP 2002 ===
- Full title: MGP 2002: De unges Melodi Grand Prix
- Track list
1. Emma – "Du er den som jeg vil ha'"
2. Simon – "Alene"
3. Pay Off – "Dig og mig"
4. Team Theis – "Turbofluen"
5. Alexandra & Charlotte – "Venskaber"
6. **Razz – "Kickflipper"**
7. Linette – "Klappesangen"
8. Heartbeat – "Din kærlighed"
9. Morten Fillipsen – "Du er ikke som de andre pi'r"
10. Monica – "Bare jeg ku' Forklare"

=== MGP 2003 ===
- Full title: MGP 2003: De unges Melodi Grand Prix
- Track list
1. Julie og Sofie – "Vi er venner"
2. Eby – "Jeg er den jeg er"
3. B-Boys – "Vi gi'r den op"
4. Linette – "Den eneste ene"
5. Tue – "Ta' mig som jeg er"
6. Shout – "Jeg tror, det kaldes kærlighed"
7. Alexander – "Super sød sag"
8. Nanna – "Er der nogen der ved"
9. Sami – "Hvad hvis nu"
10. **Anne – "Arabiens drøm"**

=== MGP 2004 ===
- Full title: MGP 2004: De unges Melodi Grand Prix
- Track list
1. Simone – "Hvorfor gik du din vej?"
2. Green Kidz – "På en grøn grøn sommerdag"
3. G=Beat – "Buster Buster"
4. Frigg – "Jeg ka' li' det"
5. **Cool Kids – "Pigen er min"**
6. Line Rømer – "Stop Stop"
7. Amalie og Frederikke – "Tænker på et kram"
8. Cozy – "Helt speciel"
9. Nico & Julie – "Første blik"
10. C-Kat – "Det er helt utroligt"

=== MGP 2005 ===
- Full title: MGP 2005: De unges Melodi Grand Prix
- Track list
1. Nanna & Annisette - "Venindetanker"
2. Marieke - "Musikken"
3. Lucas - "Fest Her"
4. Jeans - "Jeg kan nemlig godt li dig"
5. Karoline & Zoe - "Et Stjerneskud"
6. LBS - "Superman"
7. Signe K - "Kære fru lærer"
8. Twiz - "Du må forstå"
9. Julia - "Sol og Sommer"
10. **Nicolai- "Shake shake shake"**

=== MGP 2006 ===
- Full title: MGP 2006: De unges Melodi Grand Prix
- Track list
1. Lulu-Ley – "Det bedste jeg ved"
2. FOZ'N'S – "Mit hood"
3. C-Power – "S, P eller K"
4. The Rollings – "Skal vi vædde?"
5. WeMix – "Få din boogie på"
6. Pippi Punk – "De gamle damer"
7. **SEB – "Tro på os to"**
8. Lil G – "Penge"
9. MAMS – "Bang Bang"
10. SMSJKM – "Der var en dreng, der ku' li' en pige"

=== MGP 2007 ===
- Full title: MGP 2007: De unges Melodi Grand Prix
- Peak position: #1 (for 2 weeks in September/October 2007)
- Track list
1. Glitter – "Vi breaker"
2. Mathias – "Party"
3. DK-Tøserne – "Vi er gode venner"
4. Game Over – "Drømmelandet"
5. efeA-5 – "Oliver"
6. Da Boyz – "Super Snap"
7. Hjerteglimmer – "Hjerteveninder"
8. Kristian D-nay – "Pigen jeg kan li'"
9. **Amalie – "Til solen står op"**
10. The Rollers – "Charlotte"

=== MGP 2008 ===
- Full title: MGP 2008: Det er bare noget vi leger
- Peak position: #1 (for 3 weeks in October 2008)
- Track list
1. Filotte – "Rockstar"
2. **The Johanssons – "En for alle, alle for en"**
3. Fivo Nivo – "Hallo"
4. The Ugly Ducklings – "Kaospigen"
5. Play-Full – "Vi Chiller"
6. The Emilies – "Lige meget hvad"
7. Zigi – "Hey Hey"
8. S.P. Mix – "Danse natten lang"
9. Årgang 93 – "Kun om mig"
10. Sandra Monique – "Hola Chica"

=== MGP 2009 ===
- First contest without in-studio band
- Full title: MGP 2009: Det er bare noget vi leger
- Peak position: #1 (for 2 weeks in October 2009)
- Track list
1. Vi2 – "Brug for dig"
2. Niclas – "Fyr den af"
3. Engledrys – "Familien, min bedste ven"
4. Anna – "Jeg kunne alt"
5. The Futures – "Min MSN ven"
6. Tøserne Fra Tredje – "Venner"
7. Diamond Souls – "Kom vis dem hva' du ka'"
8. Caroline – "Fanget i et eventyr"
9. **Pelle B – "Kun min"**
10. Sarah Julia – "Gi' mig sommer og sol"
11. MGP Allstars 2009 – "Det er bare noget, vi leger!" (first joint song)

=== MGP 2011 ===
- Peak position: #1 (for 5 weeks in March/April 2011)
- Track list
1. Emol, R-B-G: "Vores Verden"
2. Kastanie – "Sara og Felicia"
3. **Chestnut Avenue – "Tro på dig selv"**
4. Cooly Girly – "Hvis jeg havde dig…"
5. ZAK – "Kan du føle den"
6. Nina – "Her ved mit klaver"
7. Joy Joy – "Lattergas"
8. Isabella – "Rockstar"
9. Chanlex – "Min egen Maria"
10. Chokit – "Ta' dig nu sammen du"
11. MGP Allstars 2011 – "Fantalastisk"

=== MGP 2012 ===
- Peak position: #1 (for 6 weeks in February/March 2012)
- Track list
1. The Allstars – "De hotteste kærester"
2. Astrid – "Et kvarter"
3. De to Amigos – "Mig og min amigo"
4. Sofie – "En lille del af dig"
5. Josephine – Kærestebrev
6. MC Vernes – "Bedre tider på vej"
7. **Energy – "Jeg bli'r ved"**
8. Sille – "En sidste kærlighedståre"
9. Freja-Bella – "Jeg elsker at drømme"
10. Moriwa – "Kom alle venner"
11. MGP Allstars 2012 – "Nul komma snart"

=== MGP 2013 ===
- Peak position: #1 (starting February 2013)
- Track list
1. Artbreakers – "Skolefest"
2. **Kristian – "Den første autograf"**
3. Joli – "Mens du ung"
4. Julie and the Jets – "Lad os følges ad"
5. Hugo & Elliot – "Håndværkerrøv" (feat. Stereo Moves)
6. Silmania – 'Følelser"
7. Sofia and the Sugarcubes – "Når dine øjne, de smiler"
8. 3Kløver – "Mit et og alt"
9. Cindy & Sofie – "Helt alene"
10. Cecilie – "Ingen som dig"
11. MGP Allstars 2013 – "Hvor drømme bli'r til virkelighed"

=== MGP 2014 ===
- Track list
1. Lærke – "Så Ta' Den Dog"
2. Marius – "Dig Og Mig"
3. The Cone Zone – "Den Sure Nabo"
4. Benedikte K. & The Sisters – "Det' For Sent Nu"
5. Marcus – "Julie"
6. **Emma Pi – "Du Ser Den Anden Vej"**
7. The Lucis – "Aldrig Gå Din Vej"
8. Simone & Anemone – "Drømmeland"
9. Black Moon – "Fun in the Summer"
10. Chili – "Ikke Uden Dig"
11. MGP Allstars 2014 – "Din Melodi"

=== MGP 2015 ===
- Track list
1. UZZ – "Op Til Månen"
2. The Tumbles – "Sommer i Danmark"
3. **Flora Ofelia – "Du Du Du"**
4. Tyrhan – "Tro på dig selv"
5. Dicte – "Du Må Ikke Gå Fra Mig"
6. Lady Birdz – "En Dag"
7. Caroline Sophia – "Mer' End Bare Venner"
8. Tyrees Tyr - "Guldet"
9. Ten Eyes – "Hun Er Alt For Perfekt"
10. Emma Rosa – "Du Er En Vinder"
11. MGP Allstars 2015 – "Ramt af MGP"

=== MGP 2016 ===
- Track list
1. Sofie & Augusta – "Den sødeste dreng"
2. Bølle – "Ballade"
3. Edda – "Helt Okay"
4. Meeh – "Os 2 For Altid"
5. TEENAGERS – "Teenagers"
6. Froja & Sarah – "Hvor bliver du af?"
7. Ida – "Min egen sang"
8. JEEN – "Jeg savner dig"
9. **Ida og Lærke – "Bar' for vildt"**
10. Phillip – "Kongensgade"
11. MGP Allstars 2016 – "Vores MGP"

=== MGP 2017 ===
- Track list
1. Good Harmony - "Den Fedeste Dag"
2. Amanda - "Stop Dit Drilleri"
3. JEPPANNA - "Jeg Kan Gøre, Hvad Jeg Vil"
4. Minna - "Ligesome I Alle Film"
5. Oskar - "Danmark"
6. Caroline Selma - "Mega Irriterende"
7. Maja & Annika - "Ikke Mere"
8. **Bastian - "Frikvarter"**
9. Frida Oline - "Måden, Det Bli'r Sagt På"
10. Edward - "Dans Med Mig"
11. MGP Allstars 2017 - "Vi Gør Det Igen"

=== MGP 2018 ===
- Track list
1. Ella, Klara & Sidsel - "Godt at Være Venner"
2. The One & Only Boyband - "Dine Rettigheder"
3. Melissa & Victoria - "Jeg Elsker Dig"
4. **Mille - "Til Næste År"**
5. Toby Oby - "Youtube"
6. The Angels - "Her & Nu"
7. A&T - "Det Du Gør"
8. Milo - "Se Mig"
9. Thea og Rita - "Hvis Børn Ku, Bestemme"
10. Celina - "Maskebal"
11. Ultra - "Sang nr.11" (Made by the host channel)
12. MGP Allstars 2018 - "På Vingerne"

=== MGP 2019 ===
- Track list
1. Astrid - "Når jeg danser"
2. Elio - "Musik gør mig glad"
3. Olivia - "Min drøm"
4. Alma Sophie - "Rulle skøjteløb"
5. Kiyan - "Stilen er ekstra"
6. **SODA - "Bedste veninder"**
7. The Wave - "DEn nYE treND"
8. Johannes - "Sig det nu"
9. Lisa & Xenia - "Ham, som troede"
10. Karla Sofie - "Vild med dig"
11. MGP Allstars 2019 - "kontrol"

=== MGP 2020 ===
- Track list
1. JAAIIL - "Superhelten"
2. Karla & Liva - "Brug din fantasi"
3. Julie - "Stjernen i det blå"
4. Siff - "Mit hjerte der griner"
5. Mynthe - "Syng det ud"
6. **Liva - "Ingen plan B"**
7. William - "Stjerneskud"
8. D&A - "Boomdabah Basta"
9. MGP Allstars 2020 - "Du ved hvad der skal ske"

=== MGP 2021 ===
- Track list
1. Mikkel - "Jeg tror på kærlighed"
2. Alva & Noemi - "Følg dine drømme"
3. **Emilie - "Ikke som de andre piger"**
4. Justin Le - "Lægger planer"
5. Bubble Girls - "Pinlig"
6. Adede - "Inden i mig"
7. Tinke & the Winkies - "Regnbuer"
8. Super Brothers - "Vi vil ha lov"
9. MGP Allstars 2021 - "MGP Gør Dig Flyvende"

=== MGP 2022 ===
- Track list
1. 7even - "Min mobil"
2. Jonas Funk - "Ud til verdens ende"
3. Alohomora - "Drenge og piger"
4. Isso - "Mamacita"
5. **Emma - "Hater"**
6. LUMA - "Fri"
7. The Raptiles - "Popcorn"
8. The Specials - "Som vi er"
9. MGP Allstars 2022 - "Vi er så MGP"

=== MGP 2023 ===
- Track list
1. EliNova - "Mod strømmen"
2. Dysseband - "På tur"
3. Frederik - "Pre-teen"
4. Girls on Fire - "Drømme"
5. The Five - "Tænk dig om"
6. Gustav & Magne - "Gi' dem til mig"
7. **Sophia - "Det' bare tanker"**
8. PomfrIDA & MAYAnnaise - "Hemmelighed"
9. MGP Allstars 2023 - "Mega giga MGP"

=== MGP 2024 ===
- Track list
1. BVP - "De brandvarme piger"
2. Lucas - "Bar’ gør det"
3. Candygirls - "Mere slik"
4. **Naya - "STOP!"**
5. Vigga - "Min taske"
6. Thomas - "jeg er en gamer"
7. Mary - "Unik"
8. August - "Jorden er rund"
9. MGP Allstars 2024 - "Intet er som det plejer"

=== MGP 2025 ===
- Track list
1. Donya - "Min Bror"
2. Otto - "Sød Ligesom"
3. Aida - "Sig Det Bare"
4. Spasministrene - Ud Med Regler!"
5. KarlSon - "Some"
6. **Tempo - "Lyst til at Hop'"**
7. Besties4Life - "Hesties Besties"
8. Niklas - "Mig og Min Guitar"
9. MGP Allstars 2025 - "Du Glemmer Det Aldrig!"

=== MGP 2026 ===
- Track list
1. QueenPop - "QueenPop Dance"
2. Nathaniel - "Vi vil ikk' ha' Mobning"
3. Viola - "Kom tilbage, Augusta"
4. NFS - "I pisser mig af"
5. **Anna Frida - "Ligeglad, ligeglad"**
6. Bassam - "Op Next"
7. Første Sekund - "Crush på dig"
8. Kontra - "Lige hvad du vil"

== See also ==
- MGP Nordic, pan-Scandinavian contest
- Melodi Grand Prix Junior (selection for Norway)
- Lilla Melodifestivalen (selection for Sweden)
- Junior Eurovision Song Contest, pan-European contest
- List of Danish number-one hits
