= MGP Nordic 2002 =

Song competition

Date and venue
- Final: 27 April 2002
- Venue: Forum Copenhagen; Copenhagen, Denmark

Organisation
- Broadcaster: Danmarks Radio (DR)
- Presenters: Camilla Ottesen; Stian Barsnes Simonsen; Josefin Sundström

Participants
- Number of entries: 9 entries, 3 from each Scandinavian country
- Debuting countries: Denmark; Norway; Sweden

Vote
- Voting system: Each country awards 2, 4, 6, 8, 10, and 12 points to each song
- Winning song: Denmark "Kickflipper"

MGP Nordic 2002 was the first annual MGP Nordic, a song competition eligible to singers from Denmark, Norway and Sweden between the ages of 8 and 15. It took place on 27 April 2002 in Copenhagen, Denmark and was hosted by Camilla Ottesen, Stian Barsnes Simonsen and Josefin Sundström.

The winner was then 12-year-old Razz from Denmark with his song "Kickflipper".

== Creation of the MGP Nordic ==
The contest originated in 2000 when Denmark's Radio held a song contest for Danish children that year and in 2001. The idea was extended to a Scandinavian song competition in 2002, MGP Nordic, with Denmark, Norway and Sweden as participants.

The regional MGP Juniors competitions were combined with Junior Eurovision Song Contest after the latter's creation in 2003. MGP Nordic was cancelled from 2003 to 2005 when the countries sent their finalists to JESC. But Denmark and Norway pulled out in 2006 and began holding MGP Nordic competitions again, preferring the original Scandinavian competition. Sweden participated in both contests in 2006 and 2007, with different contestants, but pulled out of JESC in 2008 before returning a year later.

== Entries ==
Each of the three countries holds preselection contests with ten national finalists: Sweden's MGP Junior which was later known as Lilla Melodifestivalen, Norway's MGPjr, and Denmark's De Unges Melodi Grand Prix. The three winners from each country compete in the final MGP Nordic competition.

== National selections ==
- Norway decided: 23 February 2002
- Denmark decided: 23 March 2002
- Sweden decided: 14 April 2002

== Participating countries ==
Participants of MGP Nordic 2002
Country	Broadcaster	Artist	Song	Language	Songwriter(s)
Denmark	DR	Morten Fillipsen	"Du er ikke som de andre pi'r"	Danish	Ebbe Ravn; Morten Fillipsen
Denmark	DR	Razz	"Kickflipper"	Danish	Rasmus Ott
Denmark	DR	Emma	"Du er den, som jeg vil ha'"	Danish	Emma Thorsteinsson
Norway	NRK	To Små Karer	"Paybacktime"	Norwegian	Christoffer B. Claussen; Nicolay Ramm
Norway	NRK	Black Jackets	"Aldri mer"	Norwegian	Håkon Solvang; Henrik Fossum; Julie Thorp; Mathias Thorp
Norway	NRK	Wicked Instinct	"Eg e'kkje aleine"	Norwegian	Eirik Kvamme; Elise Saltnes; Lars Dahl; Øyvind Zahl; Robert Ulricksborg; Tina Indrevær
Sweden	SVT	Sofie	"Superduperkille"	Swedish (Note: "Superduperkille" contains a repeated phrase in English.)	Sofie Larsson
Sweden	SVT	Fairytale	"Tills natt blir dag"	Swedish	Elisabeth Karlsson; Matilda Lundquist; Sofie Andrén
Sweden	SVT	Joel	"När blev du och jag vi?"	Swedish	Joel Andersson

=== Denmark ===
- Morten Fillipsen, aged 15 at the time, was born in Hunderup and was raised in Copenhagen. "Du er ikke som de andre pi'r" is about the girl he has a crush on and later appeared on his debut album Hold om mig.
- Razz, real name Rasmus Ott, was born in Klarup. "Kickflipper" later appeared on his debut album of the same name along with an English version called "Kickflipping".
- Emma Thorsteinsson was born on 11 August 1991, and "Du er den, som jeg vil ha'" is about the joys of spending time with a boy she has a crush on.

=== Norway ===
- To Små Karer is a rap duo consisting of Nicolay Ramm and Christoffer B. Claussen, both of which were born in 1988. "Paybacktime" is gangsta-oriented and is about beating the counter-mafia.
- Black Jackets is a pop-rock band featuring lead singer Julie Thorp, guitarist Håkon Solvang, bassist Mathias Thorp, who is Julie's brother, and drummer Henrik Fossum.
- Wicked Instinct is made up of lead singer Tina Indrevær, keyboardist Elise Saltnes, bassist Eirik Kvamme, guitarists Øyvind Zahl and Robert Ulricksborg, and drummer Lars Dahl. "Eg e'kkje aleine" is a soul ballad dedicated to Tina's mother, who died in 1999.

=== Sweden ===
- Sofie Larsson was born on 3 February 1990 in Malmö. "Superduperkille" is dedicated to her friend Benjamin.
- Fairytale consists of Sofie Andrén, Matilda Lundquist, and Elisabeth Karlsson. The group welcomed a new member, Emelie Rosen, later on.
- Joel Andersson, aged 14 at the time of the contest, was born in Lysekil. In "När blev du och jag vi?", Joel regrets being with his girlfriend for some time, leading to a breakup.

== Results ==
Each participating country sent 3 acts to perform.

Draw	Country	Artist	Song	Points	Place
1	Norway	To Små Karer	"Paybacktime"	22	7
2	Sweden	Sofie	"Superduperkille"	26	6
3	Denmark	Morten Fillipsen	"Du er ikke som de andre pi'r"	32	4
4	Norway	Black Jackets	"Aldri mer"	10	9
5	Sweden	Fairytale	"Tills natt blir dag"	38	2
6	Denmark	Razz	"Kickflipper"	44	1
7	Norway	Wicked Instinct	"Eg e'kkje aleine"	36	3
8	Sweden	Joel	"När blev du och jag vi?"	12	8
9	Denmark	Emma	"Du er den, som jeg vil ha'"	32	5

== Scoreboard ==
This points was given: 2, 4, 6, 8, 10, and 12

		Norway Jury	Sweden Jury	Denmark Jury	Norway Televoting	Sweden Televoting	Denmark Televoting
(Norway) To Små Karer	22	—	4	8	—	4	6
(Sweden) Sofie	26	2	—	6	8	—	10
(Denmark) Morten Filipsen	32	8	12	—	4	8	—
(Norway) Black Jackets	10	—	2	4	—	2	2
(Sweden) Fairytale	38	10	—	10	6	—	12
(Denmark) Razz	44	12	8	—	12	12	—
(Norway) Wicked Instinct	36	—	10	12	—	6	8
(Sweden) Joel	12	4	—	2	2	—	4
(Denmark) Emma	32	6	6	—	10	10	—
