= MGP Nordic =

Series of Scandinavian song contests

- Also known as: Melodi Grand Prix Nordic
- Genre: Music competition
- Created by: DR
- Country of origin: Denmark; Finland; Norway; Sweden
- No. of seasons: 5

Production
- Running time: Various

Original release
- Network: DR, NRK, SVT (2002–2009); Yle Fem (2007–2009)
- Release: 27 April 2002 – 28 November 2009

Related
- De unges Melodi Grand Prix; Dansk Melodi Grand Prix; Junior Eurovision Song Contest

MGP Nordic (Melodi Grand Prix Nordic) was a Scandinavian song contest for children aged 8 to 15, organized by DR, NRK, SVT and Yle through Yle Fem. It originated as a 2000 spin-off of Denmark's Eurovision Song Contest national final known as De unges Melodi Grand Prix, but expanded to become MGP Nordic in 2002 with the addition of Norway and Sweden. The competing entries were sung primarily in the official or co-official languages of the corresponding countries and written solely by the participants.

== History ==
MGP Nordic was put on hiatus in 2003 when the European Broadcasting Union began to organize the Junior Eurovision Song Contest, a pan-European expansion of the concept. Regional finalists were sent to the new competition instead of MGP Nordic until 2006, when the countries jointly pulled out of the contest due to concerns over the ethical treatment of competitors. As a result, MGP Nordic was revived in 2006, with the new addition of Finland to the competition a year later.

In 2010, the contest was supposed to have taken place in Oslo, Norway, but it was cancelled due to Denmark pulling out in order to revise the participant requirements for DR's participation in the contest. SVT has since begun competing in the Junior Eurovision Song Contest again for Sweden, returning in 2010. As a result, MGP Nordic was cancelled and has not returned since.

== National selections ==
| Country | Competition | Language | Broadcaster | National final venue | Held |
|---|---|---|---|---|---|
| Denmark | De unges Melodi Grand Prix | Danish | DR | Various (Note: 2002: TV-Byen Studio 3 (Copenhagen); 2006–2007; 2009: DR Studio (Aarhus); 2008: Musikhuset Store Sal (Aarhus)) | 2000–2009, 2011–present |
| Finland | Melodi Grand Prix | Swedish | Yle Fem | Yle Headquarters | 2007–2021 |
| Norway | MGPjr | Norwegian/Sami | NRK | Oslo Spektrum | 2002–2022 |
| Sweden | Lilla Melodifestivalen (Note: Known as MGP Junior in 2002) | Swedish | SVT | SVT Television Centre | 2002–2009, 2012–2014 |

== List of contests ==
| Year | Winner | Artist | Song | Date | Presenter | Venue | Location |
|---|---|---|---|---|---|---|---|
| 2002 | Denmark | Razz | "Kickflipper" | 27 April | Camilla Ottesen, Josefine Sundström, and Stian Barsnes | Forum Copenhagen | (Denmark) Copenhagen |
| 2006 | Denmark | SEB | "Tro på os to" | 25 November | Therese Merkel and Henrik Johnson | SVT Television Centre | (Sweden) Stockholm |
| 2007 | Norway | Celine Helgemo | "Bæstevænna" | 24 November | Nadia Hasnaoui and Stian Barsnes | Oslo Spektrum | (Norway) Oslo |
| 2008 | Norway | The BlackSheeps | "Oro jaska beana" | 29 November | Jakob Riising and Signe Lindkvist | Musikhuset Store Sal | (Denmark) Aarhus |
| 2009 | Sweden | Ulrik Munther | "En vanlig dag" | 28 November | Ola Lindholm | SVT Television Centre | (Sweden) Stockholm |

== Scoretable ==
| Rank | Country | (gold) Winner | (silver) Runner-up | (bronze) Third Place | Fourth Place | Total |
|---|---|---|---|---|---|---|
| 1 | Denmark | 2 | 2 | 1 | 0 | 5 |
| 2 | Norway | 2 | 0 | 2 | 1 | 5 |
| 3 | Sweden | 1 | 3 | 1 | 0 | 5 |
| 4 | Finland | 0 | 0 | 0 | 3 | 3 |

== See also ==
- MGP Junior, Denmark's national MGP competition
- Melodi Grand Prix Junior, Norway's national MGP competition
- Lilla Melodifestivalen, Swedish national MGP competition
- Junior Eurovision Song Contest, a pan-European version of the concept
