= Lilla Melodifestivalen =

- Also known as: MGP Junior
- Genre: Music competition
- Created by: SVT
- Country of origin: Sweden
- Original language: Swedish
- No. of seasons: 11

Original release
- Network: SVT; In collaboration with SR (2012-2014)
- Release: 14 April 2002 – 6 June 2014

Related
- Junior Eurovision Song Contest; Melodi Grand Prix Junior; MGP Junior (Danish TV series); MGP Junior (Finnish TV series)

Lilla Melodifestivalen (known as MGP Junior in 2002) was a Swedish televised song competition for children aged 8 to 15, organised by Sveriges Television (SVT). The competing songs were primarily in Swedish and written by the participants themselves.

== History ==
In 2002 and again from 2006 to 2009, it was used to select the entry to represent Sweden in Melodi Grand Prix Nordic, a song contest among Scandinavian countries. In 2003–2005 and 2012–2014, the winners participated in the Junior Eurovision Song Contest (JESC) instead, a similar competition with countries across Europe. In 2006, SVT withdrew from JESC along with Denmark and Norway and revived MGP Nordic.

In 2010, SVT returned to the Junior Eurovision Song Contest, although the entrant was selected internally. Lilla Melodifestivalen returned in 2012, with the winner being decided by only a jury. In 2015, Lilla Melodifestivalen was cancelled to focus on a new singing contest called Supershowen. If Sweden were return to the Junior Eurovision Song Contest in the future, they would use a new selection format to replace Lilla Melodifestivalen, as Supershowen runs from October to November.

Shortly after the Junior Eurovision Song Contest 2021, SVT and Norway's broadcaster NRK revealed that delegations were sent to that year's host city Paris to watch how much the contest evolved. As of 2023, SVT has yet to return to Junior Eurovision, regardless of selection process.

In March 2024, SVT announced the organization of Hello Mello, a new show aimed at identifying young talents aged 13 to 15 which is considered a continuation of Lilla Melodifestivalen. The announcement was made during the final of Melodifestivalen 2024. In Hello Mello, teenagers were assigned specially-made songs written by well-known songwriters, with lyrics in either Swedish or English, and performed those assigned songs during the live episodes.

== Editions ==
Year	Date	Venue	Presenter(s)	Winning artist(s)	Winning song	Other contests
2002	14 April 2002	SVT Headquarters	Josefine Sundström and Henry Chu	Sofie Larsson	"Superduperkillen"	MGP Nordic 2002
2003	4 October 2003	SVT Headquarters	Victoria Dyring	The Honeypies	"Stoppa mig!"	Junior Eurovision Song Contest 2003
2004	9 October 2004	SVT Headquarters	Magnus Carlsson and Mela Tesfazion	Limelights	"Varför jag?"	Junior Eurovision Song Contest 2004
2005	7 October 2005	SVT Headquarters	Nanne Grönvall and Shan Atci	M+	"Gränslös kärlek"	Junior Eurovision Song Contest 2005
2006	6 October 2006	SVT Headquarters	Anna Book and Kitty Jutbring	Benjamin Wahlgren	"Hej, Sofia!"	MGP Nordic 2006
2007	5 October 2007	SVT Headquarters	Josefine Sundström and Måns Zelmerlöw	Sk8	"Min största första kärlek"	MGP Nordic 2007
2008	4 October 2008	SVT Headquarters	Nassim Al Fakir	Linn Eriksson	"En sång från hjärtat"	MGP Nordic 2008
2009	2 October 2009	SVT Headquarters	Ola Lindholm	Ulrik Munther	"En vanlig dag"	MGP Nordic 2009
2012	6 June 2012	Gröna Lund	Molly Sandén and Kim Ohlsson	Lova Sönnerbo	"Mitt mod"	Junior Eurovision Song Contest 2012
2013	6 June 2013	Gröna Lund	Behrang Miri and Kim Ohlsson	Elias Elffors Elfström	"Det är dit vi ska"	Junior Eurovision Song Contest 2013
2014	6 June 2014	Gröna Lund	Kim Ohlsson	Julia Kedhammar	"Du är inte ensam"	Junior Eurovision Song Contest 2014

== See also ==
- MGP Nordic
- Sweden in the Junior Eurovision Song Contest
- Melodifestivalen
