= Melodi Grand Prix Junior 2013 =

Date and venue
- Final: 31 August 2013
- Venue: Oslo Spektrum; Oslo, Norway

Organisation
- Broadcaster: Norsk rikskringkasting (NRK)
- Presenters: Margrethe Røed; Tooji

Participants
- Number of entries: 10

Vote
- Voting system: Televoting, the winner is the one with most votes
- Winning song: "Så sur da" by Unik 4

The Melodi Grand Prix Junior 2013 was Norway's twelfth national Melodi Grand Prix Junior for young singers aged 8 to 15. It was held in Oslo Spektrum, Oslo, Norway and was hosted by Tooji and Margrethe Røed. The show was broadcast live Norwegian Broadcasting Corporation (NRK).

The winner was Unik 4 made up of Simen, Audun, Annika and Eline, all of which were born in 1999 and come from Bø Municipality in Telemark, Norway with the song "Så sur da". Unik 4 played violins, keyboards and drums and in between themselves were said to be able to play 10 musical instruments in addition to their vocal talents. The other Final 4 contestants were the duo Synne & Ingrid, solo act Henrik and the group A-stream.

The album Melodi Grand Prix Junior 2013 containing the songs of the finals reached No. 1 on the VG-lista Norwegian Albums Chart on weeks 36 and 37 of 2012 staying at No. 1 for two weeks.

== Results ==
=== First round ===
No.	Artist	Song	Result
01	Uzia Yakobo	"Stjerner"	Eliminated
02	Maud Gutterup and Kornelia Skogseth	"Skjera baggera"	Eliminated
03	Henrik Høven	"Når jeg ser på deg"	Super finalist
04	Ida Lunde	"Lev ut drømmen i dag"	Eliminated
05	A-Stream	"På vei"	Super finalist
06	Synne Økland Schøld and Ingrid Vestvik	"Superdeal"	Super finalist
07	Thale Henriette Kummeneje	"Ikke snu"	Eliminated
08	Daniel Kalelic	"Tiden går fort"	Eliminated
09	Anna Fauske	"Kan ikke stoppe deg"	Eliminated
10	Unik 4	"Så sur da"	Super finalist

=== Super Final ===
The exact number of public votes was unknown. Only the winner was announced.

No.	Artist	Song	Position
01	Henrik Høven	"Når jeg ser på deg"	Unknown
02	A-Stream	"På vei"	Unknown
03	Synne Økland Schøld and Ingrid Vestvik	"Superdeal"	Unknown
04	Unik 4	"Så sur da"	1
