= Melodi Grand Prix Junior 2014 =

Singing competition in Norway

Date and venue
- Final: 30 August 2014
- Venue: Oslo Spektrum; Oslo, Norway

Organisation
- Broadcaster: Norsk rikskringkasting (NRK)
- Presenters: Margrethe Røed; Tooji

Participants
- Number of entries: 10

Vote
- Voting system: Televoting, the winner is the one with most votes
- Winning song: "#online" by Mathea-Mari Glittenberg

The Melodi Grand Prix Junior 2014 was Norway's thirteenth national Melodi Grand Prix Junior for young singers aged 8 to 15. It was held in Oslo Spektrum, Oslo, Norway and broadcast live by the Norwegian Broadcasting Corporation (NRK). It was hosted by Margrethe Røed and Tooji.

The winner was 13-year-old Mathea-Mari with the song "#Online", but did not go to Junior Eurovision.

== Results ==
=== First round ===
No.	Artist	Song	Result
01	Thea Sofie Vervik Barka	"Jentekveld"	Eliminated
02	Dråkmat	"Æ ane itj æ"	Super finalist
03	Tyra Margrethe Ingdal Arnøy	"Det e hælg"	Eliminated
04	UR	"Hadde det vært no?"	Eliminated
05	Aksel Hauge Vedvik	"Ingenting å tape"	Super finalist
06	Mathea-Mari Glittenberg	"#Online"	Super finalist
07	Disel	"Stopp"	Eliminated
08	Monkey'Boy	"Som en ørn"	Eliminated
09	Tuva Finckenhagen	"Diva"	Eliminated
10	Vanja Vatle	"Du stod der og lo"	Super finalist

=== Super Final ===
The exact number of public votes was unknown. Only the winner was announced.

No.	Artist	Song	Position
01	Dråkmat	"Æ ane itj æ"	Unknown
02	Aksel Hauge Vedvik	"Ingenting å tape"	Unknown
03	Mathea-Mari Glittenberg	"#Online"	1
04	Vanja Vatle	"Du stod der og lo"	Unknown
