= Melodi Grand Prix Junior 2006 =

Norwegian television song competition

Date and venue
- Final: 22 April 2006
- Venue: Oslo Spektrum; Oslo, Norway

Organisation
- Broadcaster: Norsk rikskringkasting (NRK)
- Presenters: Stian Barsnes-Simonsen; Nadia Hasnaoui

Participants
- Number of entries: 10

Vote
- Voting system: Televoting, the winner is the one with most votes
- Winning song: "Football is great" by Ole Runar Gillebo

The Melodi Grand Prix Junior 2006 is Norway's fifth national Melodi Grand Prix Junior for singers ages 8 to 15 years old. It was held on April 21, 2006, in Oslo Spektrum, Oslo, Norway. It was broadcast live for a total of 1 hour and 15 minutes. The hosts were Stian Barsnes Simonsen and Nadia Hasnaoui. A total of 10 children participated. The contest was won by 10-year-old Ole Runar Gillebo with his song Fotball e supert (Football is super). Ole won the public vote by a landslide and received the trophy from Malin Reitan, who won the 2005 contest.

As the winners of Norway's national competition, Ole, Sondre, and Drops went on to compete in MGP Nordic 2006, with participants from Norway, Sweden, and Denmark.

The album Melodi Grand Prix Junior 2006 containing the songs of the finals reached No. 3 on the VG-lista Norwegian Albums Chart on week 18 of 2006.

== Results ==
=== First round ===
No.	Artist	Song	Result
01	KayCee	"Forelska"	Eliminated
02	Sigurd Marthinussen	"Mer av oss"	Super finalist
03	Drops	"Sjokoland"	Super finalist
04	Annette Haga	"Jeg savner deg"	Eliminated
05	Marianne Evensen	"Tivoli"	Eliminated
06	Sondre Pettersen	"Tatt"	Super finalist
07	Ane Finstad	"Trodde det var deg"	Eliminated
08	Gitarjentene	"Tenk"	Eliminated
09	Anna Elise Berg	"Hæmlihet"	Eliminated
10	Ole Runar Gillebo	"Fotball e supert"	Super finalist

=== Super Final ===
No.	Artist	Song	Position	Votes
01	Sigurd Marthinussen	"Mer av oss"	4	22,484
02	Drops	"Sjokoland"	3	22,836
03	Sondre Pettersen	"Tatt"	2	25,642
04	Ole Runar Gillebo	"Fotball e supert"	1	51,478

== Interval acts ==
The halftime acts included Mira Craig performing "Who Make You" and Malin Reitan performing "Sommer og skolefri".

== See also ==
- MGP Nordic 2006
- Melodi Grand Prix 2006
