= Melodi Grand Prix Junior 2007 =

Norwegian television song competition

Date and venue
- Final: 2 June 2007
- Venue: Oslo Spektrum; Oslo, Norway

Organisation
- Broadcaster: Norsk rikskringkasting (NRK)
- Presenter: Stian Barsnes-Simonsen

Participants
- Number of entries: 9

Vote
- Voting system: Televoting, the winner is the one with most votes
- Winning song: "Bæstevænna" by Celine Helgemo

The Melodi Grand Prix Junior 2007 was Norway's sixth national Melodi Grand Prix Junior for young singers aged 8 to 15. It was held on June 2, 2007, in Oslo Spektrum, Oslo, Norway and broadcast live presented by Stian Barsnes Simonsen. Nine participants participated and the contest was won by 11-year-old Celine Helgemo with her song Bæstevænna (Bestfriends). She received the award out of the hands of Ole Runar, who won the 2006 contest with his song "Fotball e supert".

The first and second-place winners, Celine and the duo Martin & Johannes, were Norway's participants in MGP Nordic 2007 with additional contestants from Denmark, Sweden, and Finland.

The album Melodi Grand Prix Junior 2007 containing the songs of the finals reached No. 1 on the VG-lista Norwegian Albums Chart on week 24 of 2007 staying at the top of the charts for 1 week.

== Results ==
=== First round ===
No.	Artist	Song	Result
01	Celine Helgemo	"Bæstevænna"	Super finalist
02	Angels	"Vi hopper og vi spretter"	Eliminated
03	Føniks	"Den fineste"	Super finalist
04	Susanne Mollestad	"Ingen vei"	Eliminated
05	Tre små pønkere	"Vibira"	Super finalist
06	Ivan Neeraas	"Drømmedama"	Eliminated
07	Kristin Aspelund	"Katt og mus"	Eliminated
08	The Real Five	"Kolbotn"	Eliminated
09	Martin Henriksen and Johannes Zimmer	"Når vi blir berømt"	Super finalist

=== Super Final ===
Here's the results from the superfinal. Highlighted contestants went to MGP Nordic 2007.

No.	Artist	Song	Position	Votes
01	Celine Helgemo	"Bæstevænna"	1	16,877
02	Føniks	"Den fineste"	4	11,572
03	Tre små pønkere	"Vibira"	3	13,510
04	Martin Henriksen and Johannes Zimmer	"Når vi blir berømt"	2	14,267

== Interval Acts ==
During the interval, Venke Knutson performed her song "Holiday".
