= Helgemo =

Helgemo is a Norwegian surname. Notable people with the surname include:

- Celine Helgemo (born 1995), Norwegian singer-songwriter
- Geir Helgemo (born 1970), Norwegian bridge player
