= Melodi Grand Prix Junior 2005 =

Norwegian television song competition

Date and venue
- Final: 28 May 2005
- Venue: Oslo Spektrum; Oslo, Norway

Organisation
- Broadcaster: Norsk rikskringkasting (NRK)
- Presenters: Stian Barsnes-Simonsen; Nadia Hasnaoui

Participants
- Number of entries: 10

Vote
- Voting system: Televoting, the winner is the one with most votes
- Winning song: "Sommer og skolefri" by Malin Reitan

The Melodi Grand Prix Junior 2005 was Norway's fourth national Melodi Grand Prix Junior for young singers aged 8 to 15. It was held on May 28, 2005, in Oslo Spektrum, Oslo, Norway, with a live broadcast of an hour and 15 minutes presented by Stian Barsnes-Simonsen and Nadia Hasnaoui. Ten participants competed. The contest was won by 9-year-old Malin Reitan with her song "Sommer og skolefri". She received the award from the hands of @lek, who won the 2004 contest. During the interval, Wig Wam performed "In My Dreams" and Jorun Stiansen performed "This Is the Night".

Malin, who didn't turn 10 until August, went on to represent Norway in the 2005 Junior Eurovision Song Contest, where she placed 3rd.

The album Melodi Grand Prix Junior 2005 containing the songs of the finals reached No. 1 on the VG-lista Norwegian Albums Chart on week 23 of 2005 staying at the top of the charts for 1 week.

== Results ==
=== First round ===
No.	Artist	Song	Result
01	4 You	"Dans, data og dumle"	Super finalist
02	Lil'P	"Hiphop selvbiografi"	Eliminated
03	Charlotte Tepstad Carlsen	"Kjendiser"	Eliminated
04	Karoline Wendelborg	"Står i regnet"	Eliminated
05	Maskerte barn	"Bygda mi"	Eliminated
06	Rikke Reinholdtsen and Malin J. Nordahl	"Det e teit"	Eliminated
07	New Justice	"Skola e en slum"	Super finalist
08	Malin Reitan	"Sommer og skolefri"	Super finalist
09	Silje Risdal	"Mobba"	Eliminated
10	Friends	"Sammen"	Super finalist

=== Super Final ===
No.	Artist	Song	Position	Votes
01	4 You	"Dans, data og dumle"	4	15,276
02	New Justice	"Skola e en slum"	2	26,360
03	Malin	"Sommer og skolefri"	1	43,201
04	Friends	"Sammen"	3	15,458
