= Amigo (game show) =

- Directed by: Geir Kåre Nes
- Starring: Stian Barsnes Simonsen
- Country of origin: Norway

Production
- Running time: 20-25 min.

Original release
- Network: NRK
- Release: October 22, 2005 – December 30, 2006

Amigo is a game show for kids in Norway. The host is Stian Barsnes Simonsen, who is also the host for Melodi Grand Prix Junior with Nadia Hasouni. Amigo has an individual named The Soundeffect-man. The format consists of three teams, with two children each. The children make their own version of the Amigo theme song, which they then sing. The show is recorded in the NRK studio in Oslo, Norway.

== Seasons ==
- Season 1: October 22, 2005 - December 30, 2005
- Season 2: November 11, 2006 - December 30, 2006
