= Melodi Grand Prix Junior 2011 =

Norwegian television song competition

Date and venue
- Final: 3 September 2011
- Venue: Oslo Spektrum; Oslo, Norway

Organisation
- Broadcaster: Norsk rikskringkasting (NRK)
- Presenters: Margrethe Røed; Alex Rosén

Participants
- Number of entries: 10

Vote
- Voting system: Televoting, the winner is the one with most votes
- Winning song: "Trenger deg" by Sval Rosenløw Eeg

The Melodi Grand Prix Junior 2011 was Norway's tenth national Melodi Grand Prix Junior for young singers aged 8 to 15. It was held in Oslo Spektrum, Oslo, Norway and broadcast live Norwegian Broadcasting Corporation (NRK).

The winner was Sval Rosenløw Eeg, known as Sval, with the song "Trenger deg" (Norwegian for Need you).

== Results ==
=== First round ===
No.	Artist	Song	Result
01	The Sugarsmokers	"Fåkke lov"	Eliminated
02	Sol Strøm Jensen	"Kom tilbake"	Super finalist
03	Lina Tufto	"Klatre steg for steg"	Eliminated
04	Nordlyset	"Snu deg"	Eliminated
05	Emma Valkeapää	"Don"	Eliminated
06	Seven B	"Et fett liv"	Super finalist
07	Tiril Asak	"Du planter et smil"	Eliminated
08	Erlend Guttulsrud Kristiansen	"Ta det som det kommer"	Eliminated
09	Sval Rosenløw Eeg	"Trenger deg"	Super finalist
10	Kristin Langsrud	"Alltid være barn"	Super finalist

=== Super Final ===
The exact number of public votes was unknown. Only the winner was announced.

No.	Artist	Song	Position
01	Sol Strøm Jensen	"Kom tilbake"	Unknown
02	Seven B	"Et fett liv"	Unknown
03	Sval Rosenløw Eeg	"Trenger deg"	1
04	Kristin Langsrud	"Alltid være barn"	Unknown
