= Melodi Grand Prix Junior 2009 =

Norwegian television song competition

Date and venue
- Final: 5 September 2009
- Venue: Oslo Spektrum; Oslo, Norway

Organisation
- Broadcaster: Norsk rikskringkasting (NRK)
- Presenters: Kåre Magnus Bergh; Marthe Sveberg Bjørstad

Participants
- Number of entries: 10

Vote
- Voting system: Televoting, the winner is the one with most votes
- Winning song: "Your own way" by Jorgen Dahl Moe

The Melodi Grand Prix Junior 2009 was Norway's eighth national Melodi Grand Prix Junior for young singers aged 8 to 15. It was held in Oslo Spektrum, Oslo, Norway and broadcast live Norwegian Broadcasting Corporation (NRK) in September 2009.

There were 540 submissions out of which 10 were chosen for the finals, a mix of solo singers, but also two bands, and two hip-hop contributions. The competition was won by Jørgen Dahl Moe with his song "Din egen vei" and the runner up was Mystery with their song "Rock e sunt". Both went on to represent Norway in MGP Nordic 2009.

The album Melodi Grand Prix Junior 2009 containing the songs of the finals reached No. 1 on the VG-lista Norwegian Albums Chart on week 38 of 2005 staying at the top of the charts for 1 week.

== Results ==
=== First round ===
| No. | Artist | Song | Result |
|---|---|---|---|
| 01 | Finstad Bad Boys | "Vi er gutta" | Eliminated |
| 02 | Martine Othelie Almaas | "Æ villa bort" | Eliminated |
| 03 | 2Boys | "Du og jeg" | Eliminated |
| 04 | Ingvild Fjeldheim | "Sangen" | Super finalist |
| 05 | Sikt inn | "Alt hva jeg vil bli" | Eliminated |
| 06 | Maren Klethagen | "Jeg bare smiler" | Super finalist |
| 07 | Jørgen Dahl Moe | "Din egen vei" | Super finalist |
| 08 | Mystery | "Rock e sunt" | Super finalist |
| 09 | Lisa Winsjansen Restad | "Hjerte banke" | Eliminated |
| 10 | Rachel Kashafali and Anney Niokyndi | "Skolen" | Super finalist |

=== Super Final ===
The exact number of public votes was unknown. Only first and second places were announced during then.

| No. | Artist | Song | Position |
|---|---|---|---|
| 01 | Ingvild Fjeldheim | "Sangen" | Unknown |
| 02 | Maren Klethagen | "Jeg bare smiler" | Unknown |
| 03 | Jørgen Dahl Moe | "Din egen vei" | 1 |
| 04 | Mystery | "Rock e sunt" | 2 |
| 05 | Rachel Kashafali and Anney Niokyndi | "Skolen" | Unknown |
