= Ai (pop group) =

Swedish pop group

Ai was a Swedish pop group mainly known for participating in Melodifestivalen 1999 with the song ”Bilder av dig”. The group's name came from the Japanese word Ai, which means love. The group consisted of Malin Holmgren, Helena Hellqvist, Josefine Sundström, Anna Suatan and Claudia Unda.

== Discography ==
=== Singles ===
Title	Year	Peak chart positions	Album
Title	Year	SWE	Album
"Bilder av dig"	1999	41	Non-album single
