= Nicolay Ramm =

Norwegian journalist and comedian (born 1988)

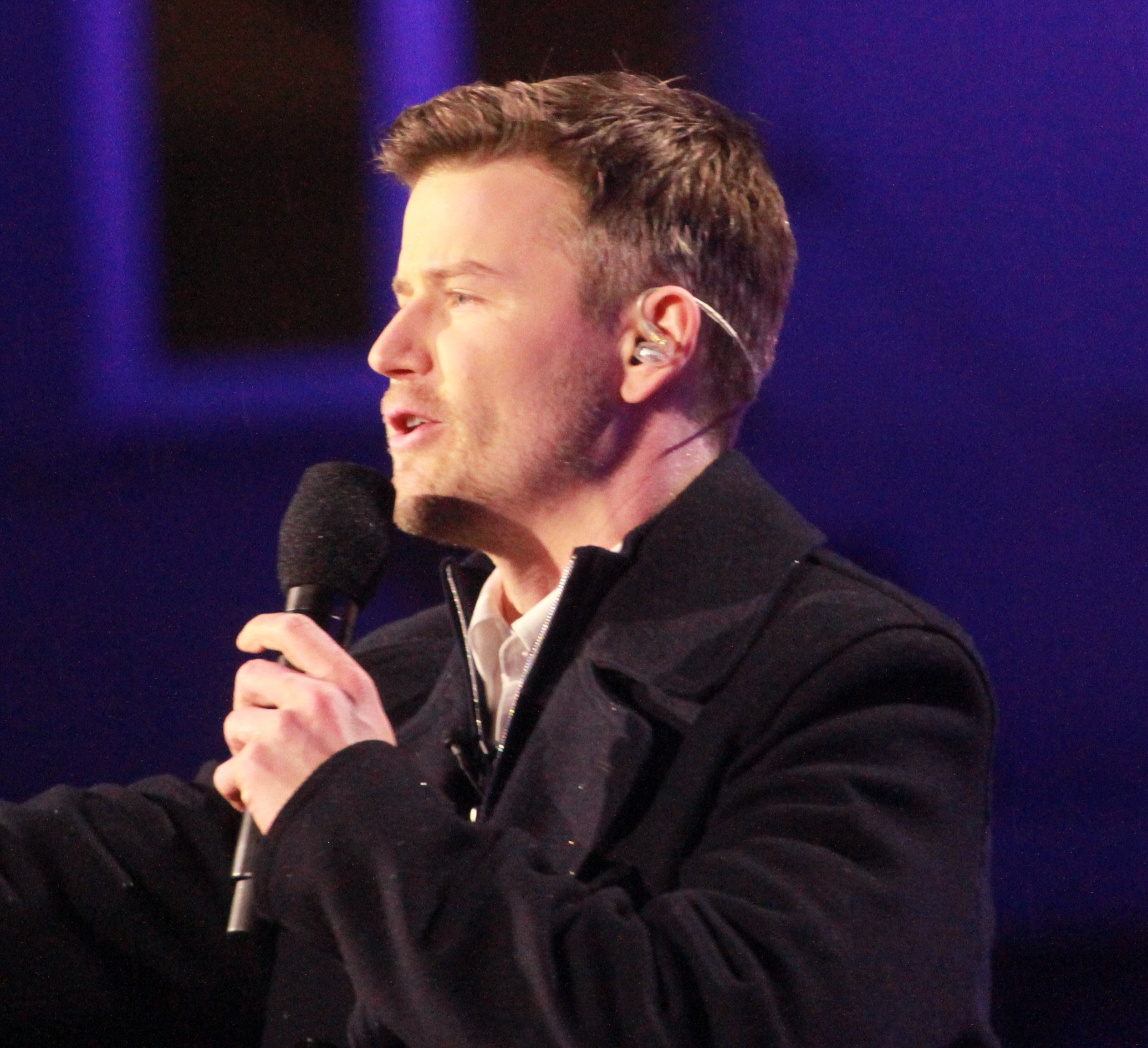
- Ramm in 2025
- Born: Nicolay André Ramm; 23 December 1988 (age 37); Bærum, Norway
- Occupations: Journalist; Actor; Television presenter; Singer; Rapper; Comedian
- Years active: 2002–present
- Musical career
- Instrument: Vocals

Nicolay André Ramm (born 23 December 1988) is a Norwegian journalist, recording artist, presenter, comedian and actor.

== Education and work ==
He has a journalism degree from Oslo University College, and he has a theater degree from East 15 Acting School in London.

Ramm started his career in NRK Sport and VG-sporten, with several years as a sports journalist. He later became the host of the online initiative Helt Ramm on NRK, and he has made several programs linked to major sporting events.

Ramm is also part of the humorous song group Punchline where he (strongly inspired by Jon Niklas Rønning) sings, writes sketches and arranges the music. In 2012, he directed and wrote Rudrevyen2012 at Rud videregående skole together with Simen Sandberg. The revue also won two prizes during Revykavalkaden the same year.

Ramm was in his youth in the rap group To små karer, who won Melodi Grand Prix Junior in 2002.

Ramm participated in the World Cup at grass skiing in Austria in 2017, where he came in 50th place with a time of 1:07:56.

In February 2019, he released the single "Raske briller", which topped VG-lista for three weeks in March 2019. For the song, he was nominated for Spellemannprisen 2019 in the class song of the year.

== Television ==
- MGPjr 2002 as participant (2002)
- Helt Ramm (2015–2019)
- MGPjr 2016 as host (2016)
- MGPjr 2017 as host (2017)
- Huskestue (2017)
- Beat for beat (2017)
- Sommeråpent (2017)
- Ramm, ferdig, gå! (2018)
- Jorden rundt på 6 steg (2018)
- Idrettsgallaen 2019 together with Tiril Sjåstad Christiansen (for the year 2018)
- Idrettsgallaen 2020 host together with Birgit Skarstein (for the year 2019)
- Maskorama in the detective panel together with Jan Thomas and Marion Ravn (2020)
