= Lily Bandehy =

Norwegian-Iranian writer

Lily Bandehy (born 1949) is a Norwegian-Iranian author, commentator and critic of Islam.

== Biography ==
Born in Iran, Bandehy was an oppositional activist against both the Shah and Ayatollah Khomeini. She was imprisoned and sentenced to lifelong exile. She emigrated to Norway in 1988 where she became a psychiatric nurse.

She has been the deputy leader of Ex-Muslims of Norway since 2016.

In 2021 she published her book Kvinner i islam. Islams forakt for kvinner, a book critical of Islam's positions on women, that needed police protection at its release event.

She has said that it is worth risking one's life to criticise Islam, and she has held demonstrations where she has publicly burned the hijab.

== Personal life ==
Singer Tooji who represented Norway in the Eurovision Song Contest 2012 is her son. She has praised him for coming out as gay.

== Bibliography ==
- Jeg kommer fra Iran, 2003
- En slette av valmuer, 2012
- Smaksrike minner fra Persia, 2014
- Smaken av kirsebær, 2019
- Kvinner i islam, Islams forakt for kvinner, 2021
