= Melodi Grand Prix Junior 2004 =

Norwegian television song competition

Date and venue
- Final: 12 June 2004
- Venue: Oslo Spektrum; Oslo, Norway

Organisation
- Broadcaster: Norsk rikskringkasting (NRK)
- Presenters: Stian Barsnes-Simonsen; Nadia Hasnaoui

Participants
- Number of entries: 10

Vote
- Voting system: Televoting, the winner is the one with most votes
- Winning song: "En stjerne skal jeg bli" by @lek

Melodi Grand Prix Junior 2004 was the third music competition in Norway in the series Melodi Grand Prix Junior for children aged 9 and 15 years. The winner of 2003 was the group @lek with their song "En stjerne skal jeg bli", which represented Norway at the Junior Eurovision Song Contest 2004.

The album Melodi Grand Prix Junior 2004 containing the songs of the finals reached #3 on the VG-lista Norwegian Albums Chart on week 26 of 2003 staying at #4 for 2 weeks.

== Results ==
=== First round ===
| No. | Artist | Song | Result |
|---|---|---|---|
| 01 | Ceejays | "Hør på oss" | Super finalist |
| 02 | Joakim Molander | "Vi to" | Eliminated |
| 03 | Vi | "Det æ'kke deg – det er meg" | Eliminated |
| 04 | @lek | "En stjerne skal jeg bli" | Super finalist |
| 05 | The Exocarps | "Andreplass" | Eliminated |
| 06 | Sheep Boys | "Damer er no' dritt" | Eliminated |
| 07 | Luna | "Min egen vei" | Eliminated |
| 08 | Hanne Merete Kristensen | "Her for deg" | Super finalist |
| 09 | Summerboys | "Det var sommer" | Super finalist |
| 10 | Rosa Klinkekuler | "Bikinidamene" | Eliminated |

=== Super Final ===
| No. | Artist | Song | Position | Votes |
|---|---|---|---|---|
| 01 | Ceejays | "Hør på oss" | 3 | 16,188 |
| 02 | @lek | "En stjerne skal jeg bli" | 1 | 24,765 |
| 03 | Hanne Merete Kristensen | "Her for deg" | 4 | 13,285 |
| 04 | Summerboys | "Det var sommer" | 2 | 24,181 |
