= Selma Ibrahim =

Norwegian actress and presenter

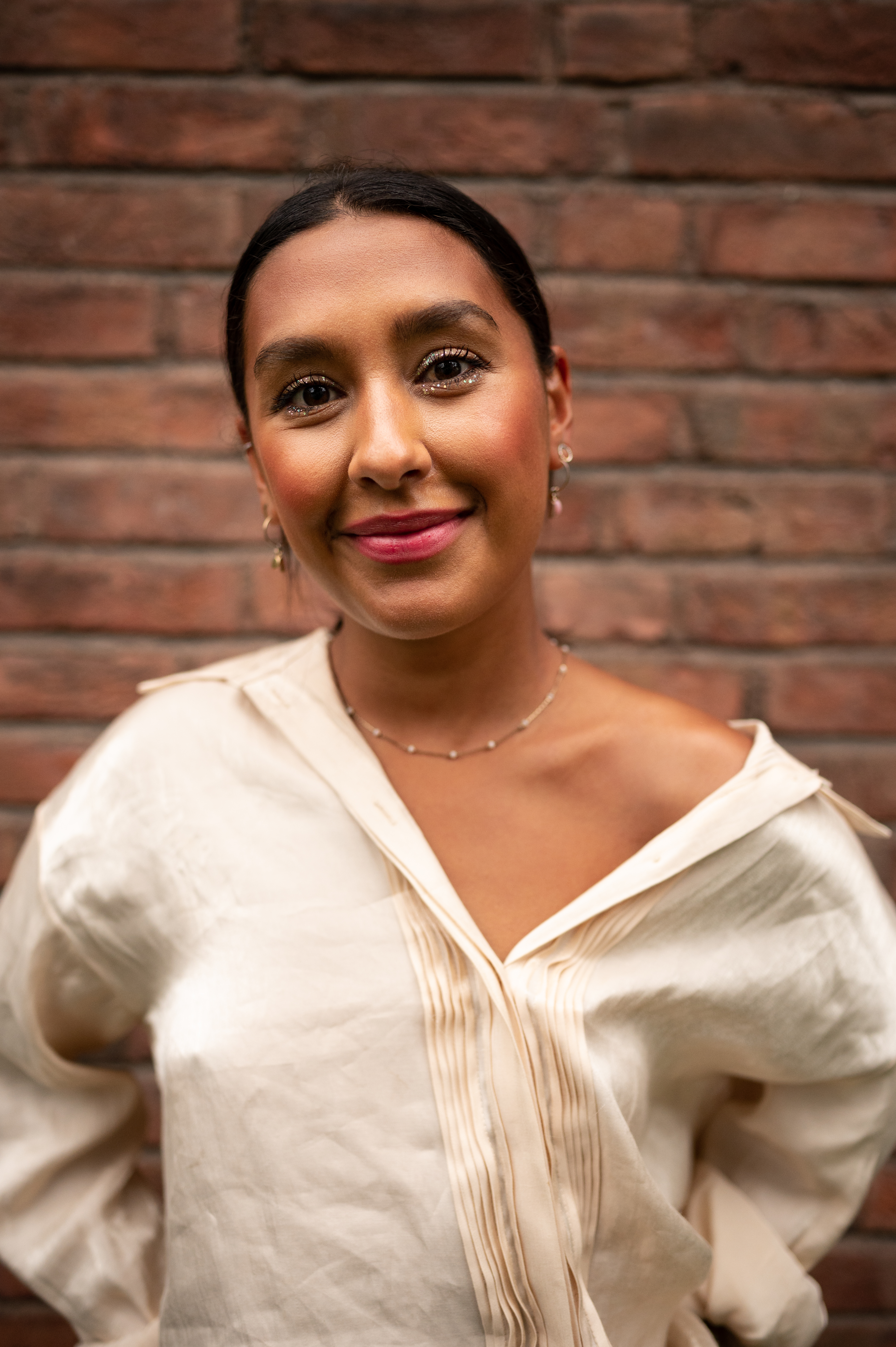
- Ibrahim in August 2020
- Education: Danvik Folk High School (2015-2016)
- Occupations: Actor; TV presenter

Selma Ibrahim Karlsen is a Norwegian actress and presenter, raised in Kolbotn, Follo.

== Education and career ==
Ibrahim studied acting technique at Danvik Folk High School from 2015 to 2016.

She started at NRK in autumn 2016 as a reporter and journalist in Supernytt. Ibrahim has later participated in several NRK series such as Skam, Supernytt and the hunt for the truth, Superkrim, and led NRK's autumn launch together with Dan Børge Akerø.

She performed the song "Fake news er dust" together with Johannes Slettedal as an intermission feature during MGPjr 2019 and at Allsang på Grensen the same year.

She has been presenter of MGPjr in 2020, 2021 and 2022, the first two years with Victor Sotberg. For MGPjr 2022, she won the class best presenter of entertainment during Gullruten 2023. In 2020, she hosted the children's TV program Julemorgen (English: Christmas morning) together with Mathias Luppichini. In June 2022, she performed the BlimE! song "Den ene" outside Rådhusplassen in Oslo at the VG-lista Topp20 event.

In autumn 2022, she was a guest judge on Maskorama on NRK1 and from 2023, she is the co-host of Alle mot 1 on the same channel. In 2023, she led the Spellemannprisen 2022 together with Yosef Wolde-Mariam.

== Bibliography ==
- Ibrahim, Selma (2022-11-17). Bare en venn (in Norwegian). Pullman publishing. ISBN 9788293891062.
