= Melodi Grand Prix Junior 2003 =

Norwegian television song competition

Date and venue
- Final: 6 September 2003
- Venue: Oslo Spektrum; Oslo, Norway

Organisation
- Broadcaster: Norsk rikskringkasting (NRK)
- Presenter: Stian Barsnes-Simonsen

Participants
- Number of entries: 10

Vote
- Voting system: Televoting, the winner is the one with most votes
- Winning song: "Sinnssykt gal forelsket" by 2U

Melodi Grand Prix Junior 2003 was the second music competition in Norway in the series Melodi Grand Prix Junior for children between the ages of 8 and 15. The winner of 2003 was the group 2U with their song "Sinsykt gal forelsket", which represented Norway at the inaugural Junior Eurovision Song Contest.

The album Melodi Grand Prix Junior 2003 containing the songs of the finals reached #4 on the VG-lista Norwegian Albums Chart on week 38 of 2003 staying at #4 for 2 weeks.

== Results ==
=== First round ===
| No. | Artist | Song | Result |
|---|---|---|---|
| 01 | Kjersti Palm Reitan | "Et nytt håp" | Eliminated |
| 02 | Atle Pettersen and Stine Cecilie Hillestad | "Hekta på brett" | Eliminated |
| 03 | Spiri2 | "Han er min" | Super finalist |
| 04 | Scholastika | "Hun var så pissed off" | Super finalist |
| 05 | 2U | "Sinnssykt gal forelsket" | Super finalist |
| 06 | Kaja Bremnes | "Rødt" | Eliminated |
| 07 | Alexandra Sissner | "Jeg vet en dag" | Eliminated |
| 08 | Cold Breeze | "Som olje i vann" | Eliminated |
| 09 | Tina Dahl | "En sjanse til" | Eliminated |
| 10 | Hidden Soul | "Canis Lupus" | Super finalist |

=== Super Final ===
| No. | Artist | Song | Position | Votes |
|---|---|---|---|---|
| 01 | Spiri2 | "Han er min" | 3 | 11,546 |
| 02 | Scholastika | "Hun var så pissed off" | 2 | 14,434 |
| 03 | 2U | "Sinnssykt gal forelsket" | 1 | 22,596 |
| 04 | Hidden Soul | "Canis Lupus" | 4 | 11,163 |
