= Maureen Louys =

Belgian television presenter

- Born: 3 November 1978 (age 47); Liège, Belgium
- Occupation: Presenter
- Years active: 2003–present

Maureen Louys (born 3 November 1978 in Liège) is a Belgian television presenter.

== Career ==
In 2005 she co-presented the 2005 Junior Eurovision Song Contest with Marcel Vanthilt. Louys still remained associated with the regular Eurovision Song Contest as giving out the Belgian televotes during the voting in 2007, 2009 and 2011. Following the death of Jean-Pierre Hautier in October 2012, Louys is currently the RTBF Eurovision Commentator, together with colleague Jean-Louis Lahaye.

In 2009 Louys presented RTBF's Best of humor.

In 2012 to 2024, she's the host of The Voice Belgique on La Une.

| Preceded by (Norway) Nadia Hasnaoui and Stian Barsnes Simonsen | Junior Eurovision Song Contest presenter 2005; With: Marcel Vanthilt | Succeeded by (Romania) Ioana Ivan and Andreea Marin Bănică |
