= Marcel Vanthilt =

Belgian musician and television presenter

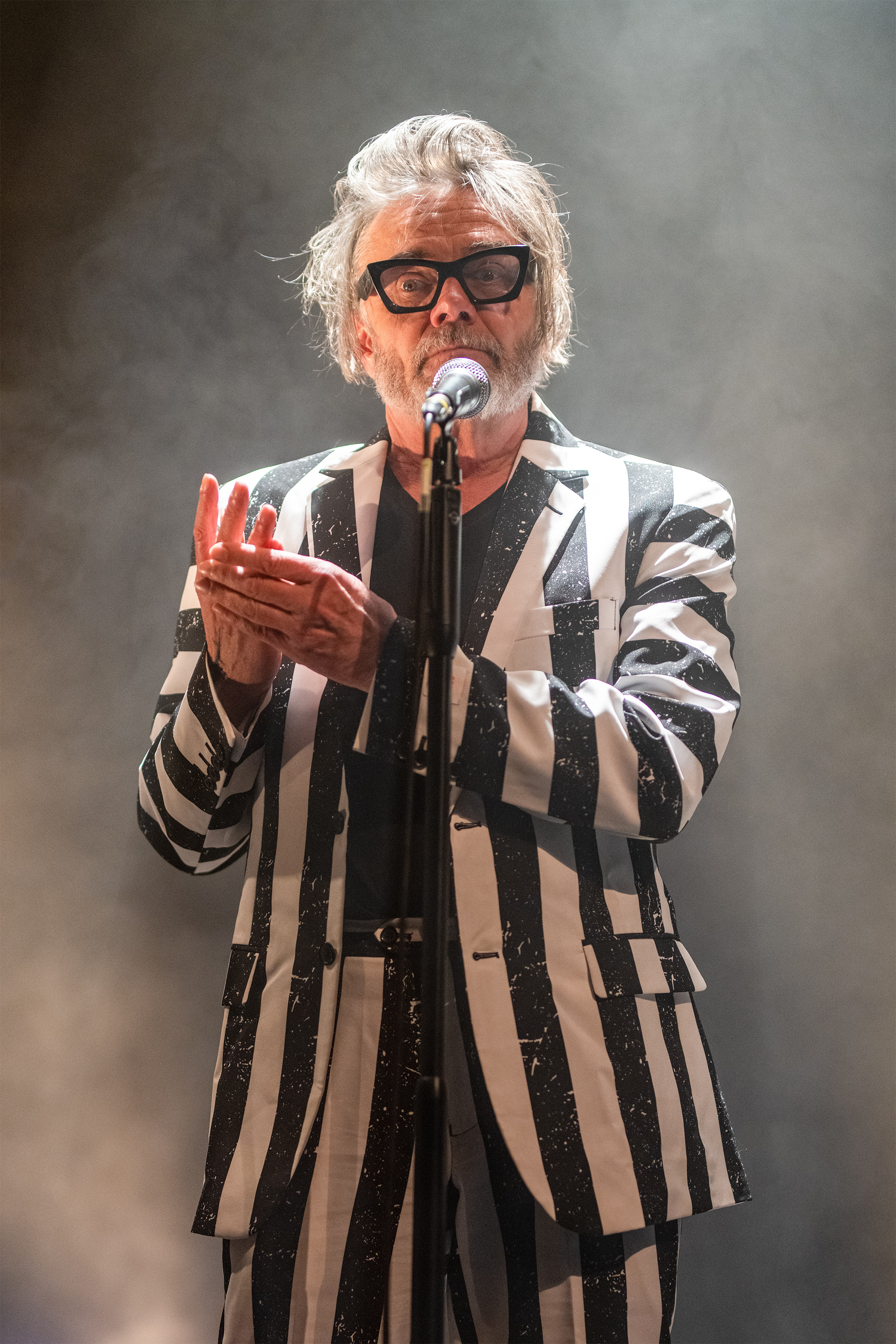
- Born: Marcel Céline Gerard Edgard Vanthilt; 24 August 1957 (age 68); Lommel, Belgium
- Occupations: Musician, television presenter

Marcel Céline Gerard Edgard Vanthilt (Dutch pronunciation: [mɑrˈsɛl vɑnˈtɪlt]; born 24 August 1957) is a Belgian singer and television presenter.

== Early life ==
Marcel Vanthilt was born on 24 August 1957, in Lommel, Belgium. After attending high school, he studied at the Vrije Universiteit Brussel and attained a bachelor's degree in political sciences. In 1977, while at university, he discovered Punk.

== Career ==
=== Arbeid Adelt! ===
Vanthilt formed the group Arbeid Adelt! (literally: "Labor ennobles") in 1981. He provided vocals and played keyboard for the group, singing mainly in Dutch. They made 2 EPs ('Jonge Helden' and 'Le chagrin en Quatre-vingt'), De Dag dat het zonlicht... and Lekker Westers. The group decided to split. One year later, they reformed, only to split again after releasing one single because they were dissatisfied with their record label and the members disagreed about the future of the band. Vanthilt said: "They saw us as a kind of clowns. They refused to bring out the songs that were representative of what we were doing, and released "Stroom" en "Witte kom hie". Those were both good jokes, good for a laugh at the live gigs, but not good as a release two years after your last record."

In 1991 the group got together again and signed with Virgin Records. This resulted in their first full CD, Des Duivels Oorkussen, but it was unsuccessful commercially.

=== Other ===
Vanthilt formed two other groups, The Yéh-yéhs and Groep Z. Both were unsuccessful.

=== MTV VJ ===
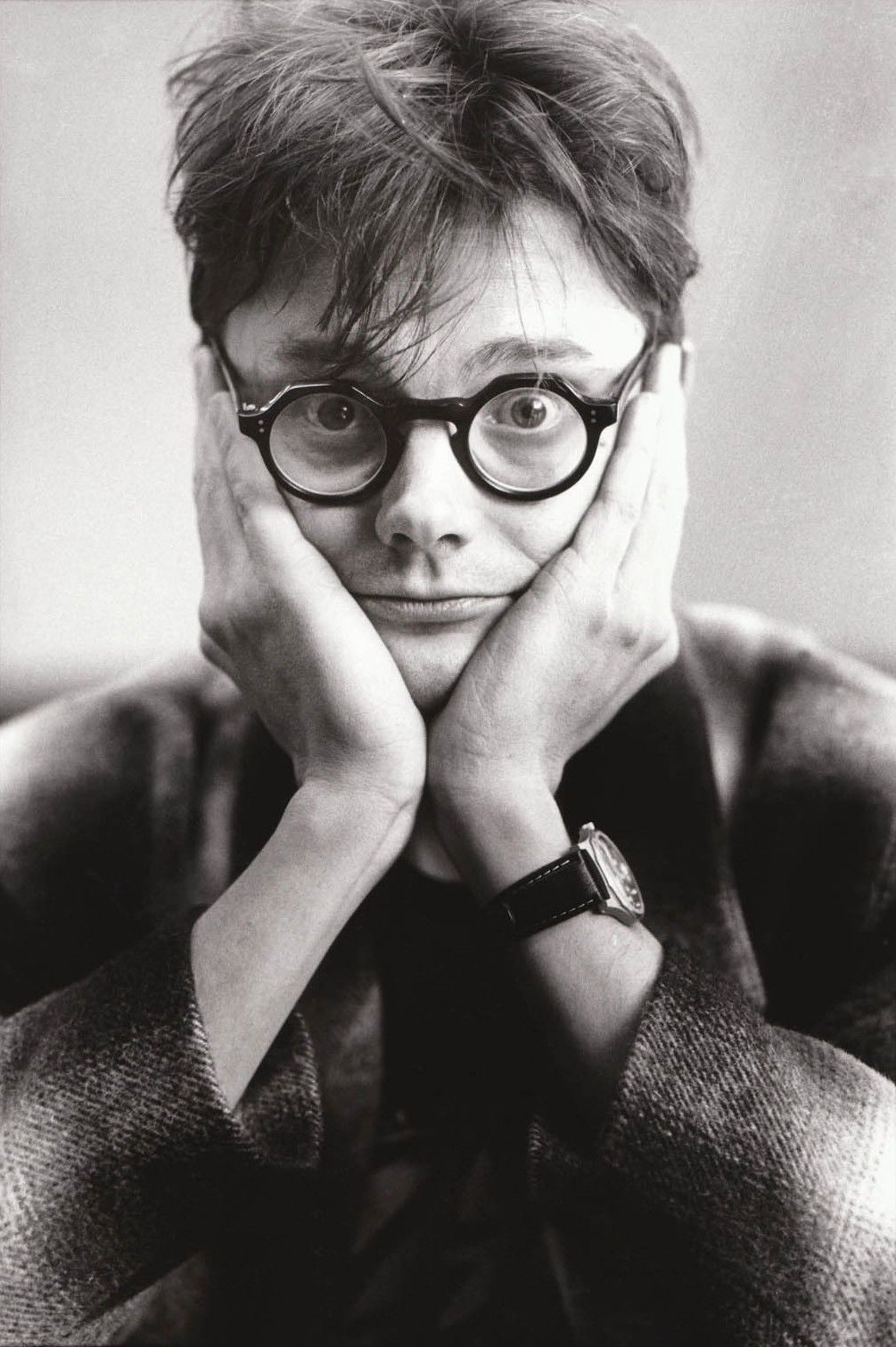
Vanthilt in the 80s

From 1987 to 1990, Vanthilt lived in London where he became a VJ for the new music station MTV Europe. His best-known programme was Cokes & Vanthilt, which he presented in co-operation with Ray Cokes. The two got together again on New Year's Eve 2008 for a one time show on Belgian network Canvas.

=== United States ===
From 1996 to 1998, Vanthilt lived in the United States to find his wife. He tried to launch an acting career, but was unsuccessful. He divorced his wife and returned to Belgium. He also wrote columns for the magazine Panorama. He bundled his columns in a book, called Ha!Merika! and adapted it to a theatre show.

=== Belgian TV and radio career ===
From 1998 onwards, Vanthilt became involved with the media in Belgium, mostly on Flemish radiostation Studio Brussel and TV-station Eén. On TV, he hosted various shows, such as quizzes ('Quix', 'ViaVia', 'De lage Landen'). His most famous quiz was perhaps 'Tien voor Taal', a language-centered quiz, which he co-hosted with Dutch presenter Anita Witzier. He had a short stint with vtm, for which he hosted 'Tilt' (1993–1995), but soon returned to the VRT. He further hosted reality show "Wit in Vegas" (2005), in which he accompanied couples wanting to get married in Las Vegas. On 26 November 2005, Vanthilt co-hosted the Junior Eurovision Song Contest with Maureen Louys. In recent years, Vanthilt has appeared on screen as a talkshow host. From 2006 to 2009 he appeared as a weekly guest in late night talkshow "De laatste show". He continued on to host the summer talkshow Zomer 2007 and Zomer 2008, in alternation with Ben Crabbé. Since 2009 he has his own summer talkshow, Villa Vanthilt. These shows are recorded in a makeshift studio in a Flemish city. In 2009, the cities chosen were Ghent and Hasselt; in 2010 Hasselt and Kortrijk. He has since started the 2011-season of Villa Vanthilt, five weeks in Dendermonde and five weeks in Roeselare. His program is scheduled to run to the end of August. Since 2009, Vanthilt also hosts Ook getest op mensen, a TV show mainly focusing on health related consumer issues (Eén).

His most important radio show was "Was het nu 70, 80 of 90" (Was it 70, 80 or 90?), but he also hosted the "Album 100".

| Preceded by (Norway) Nadia Hasnaoui and Stian Barsnes Simonsen | Junior Eurovision Song Contest presenter 2005; With: Maureen Louys | Succeeded by (Romania) Ioana Ivan and Andreea Marin Bănică |
