= Andreea Marin =

Romanian television presenter

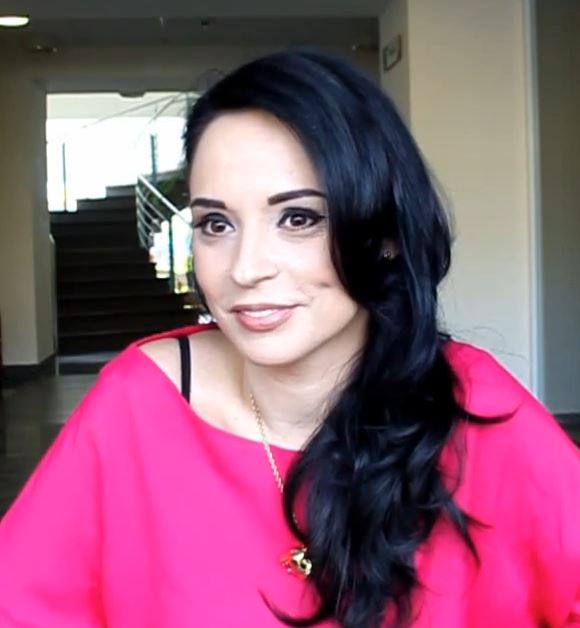
- Marin during an interview in 2011
- Born: Andreea Violeta Marin; 22 December 1974 (age 51); Roman, Neamț County, Romania
- Other name: Andreea Marin Bănică
- Occupation: Television presenter
- Years active: 1994–present
- Spouse(s): Ștefan Bănică Jr. (m. 2006; div. 2013) Tuncay Öztürk (m. 2014; div. 2017)
- Children: 1

Andreea Violeta Marin (born 22 December 1974) is a Romanian television presenter and TV personality.

== Early life and career ==
She majored in Journalism, Public Relations & Advertisement, Computer Programming and Mathematics & Physics during her college years. She debuted in 1994 at TVR Iași as emcee.

Her involvement within the Romanian media seems to have directly contributed to her selection as the most successful female media person in the country. On 2 December 2006, Marin hosted the 2006 Junior Eurovision Song Contest. She also presented the Romanian votes at the 2000, 2004, 2006, and 2007 Eurovision Song Contest finals.

Since 1999, she has hosted and directed Surprize, Surprize ("Surprises, Surprises"), a long-running show about life stories involving disabled people, people without money, and people with relatives gone away, broadcast on TVR1.

Marin is the communications director of Madrid-based Prime Time World Broadcast, and the editorial director of the Romanian version of Business Woman Magazine.

== Personal life ==
Married to Ștefan Bănică Jr. in 2006, she was subsequently known as Andreea Marin Bănică. They have a daughter, Ana Violeta Bănică (b. 15 December 2007). The couple divorced in 2013. She married physician Tuncay Öztürk in 2014. In October 2016, they announced the end of their marriage. Their marriage was officially ended on 13 February 2017.

Preceded by (Belgium) Maureen Louys and Marcel Vanthilt	Junior Eurovision Song Contest presenter 2006; With: Ioana Ivan	Succeeded by (Netherlands) Kim-Lian van der Meij and Sipke Jan Bousema
