= MGP Nordic 2007 =

Song competition

Date and venue
- Final: 24 November 2007
- Venue: Oslo Spektrum; Oslo, Norway

Organisation
- Broadcaster: Norsk rikskringkasting (NRK)
- Presenters: Nadia Hasnaoui; Stian Barsnes Simonsen

Participants
- Number of entries: 8 entries, 2 from each Scandinavian country
- Debuting countries: Finland

Vote
- Voting system: Points are given depending on the percentage of the vote received by each country e.g. 21% equals 2100 points
- Winning song: Norway "Bæstevænna"

The Melodi Grand Prix Nordic 2007 was the third Nordic Melodi Grand Prix, a Scandinavian song contest for children aged 8 to 15. The contest was held on November 24, 2007 in Oslo, Norway.

Participating countries were Norway, Sweden, Denmark and Finland. 2007 also marked the first time that Finland participated. The debuting country was represented by Yle Fem, the Swedish-speaking division of Yle. As a result, Finland's songs were sung in Swedish rather than Finnish.

== Organization ==
One song from each country will win a place in the 'super final', whereupon a winner will be announced. Winners were determined only by televoting. Each country has a total of 10,000 points to give to others, and these points are distributed according to the percentage each country gets votes.

== National selections ==
- Norway decided: 2 June 2007
- Denmark decided: 15 September 2007
- Sweden decided: 5 October 2007
- Finland decided: 2 November 2007

== Participating countries ==
Each of the Scandinavian countries were represented by two artists.

Participants of MGP Nordic 2007
Country	Broadcaster	Artist	Song	Language	Songwriter(s)
Denmark	DR	Mathias	"Party"	Danish (Note: "Til solen står op" contains a repeated phrase in English.)	Mathis Augustine
Denmark	DR	Amalie	"Til solen står op"	Danish	Amalie Høegh
Finland	Yle Fem	Linn	"En liten önskan"	Swedish	Linn Nygård
Finland	Yle Fem	Sister Twister	"Fröken Perfekt"	Swedish	Elin Blom
Norway	NRK	Celine	"Bæstevænna"	Norwegian	Celine Helgemo
Norway	NRK	Martin & Johannes	"Når vi blir berømt"	Norwegian	Johannes Zimmer; Martin Henriksen
Sweden	SVT	SK8	"Min största första kärlek"	Swedish	Jesper Björklund; Kenny Vadlin; Lukas Edvardsson
Sweden	SVT	Vendela	"Gala Pala Gutchi"	Swedish	Vendela Hollström

== Results ==
=== First round ===
The artist with the most votes from each country proceeded to the Super Final. The participants in the second round of the competition were Norway's Celine Helgemo, Finland's Linn Nygård, Denmark's Mathis Augustine, and Sweden's Vendela Hollström.

Draw	Country	Artist	Song	Result
1	Sweden	SK8	"Min största första kärlek"	Out
2	Norway	Celine Helgemo	"Bæstevænna"	Super-final
3	Finland	Linn Nygård	"En liten önskan"	Super-final
4	Denmark	Mathias	"Party"	Super-final
5	Sweden	Vendela	"Gala Pala Gutchi"	Super-final
6	Norway	Martin & Johannes	"Når vi blir berømt"	Out
7	Finland	Sister Twister	"Fröken Perfekt"	Out
8	Denmark	Amalie	"Til solen står op"	Out

=== Super final ===
Each country sang their songs again for the Scandinavian public. The viewers then voted for the second time. Each song gained points depending on the percentage of votes they won from each country. Norway was the tight winner of the contest with 11,358, only 143 points more than second placed Sweden, and only 476 points more than third-place Denmark.

Draw	Country	Artist	Song	Votes	Place
1	Norway	Celine Helgemo	"Bæstevænna"	11,358	1
2	Finland	Linn Nygård	"En liten önskan"	6,545	4
3	Denmark	Mathias	"Party"	10,882	3
4	Sweden	Vendela	"Gala Pala Gutchi"	11,215	2

=== Voting ===
		Televoting Results				
		Total Score	Denmark	Norway	Sweden	Finland
Contestants	(Denmark) Mathias	10,882	X	5,402	3,168	2,312
Contestants	(Norway) Celine	11,358	4,306	X	3,566	3,486
Contestants	(Sweden) Vendela	11,215	3,548	3,465	X	4,202
Contestants	(Finland) Linn	6,545	2,146	1,133	3,266	X
