= Josefine Sundström =

Swedish television host, author and singer

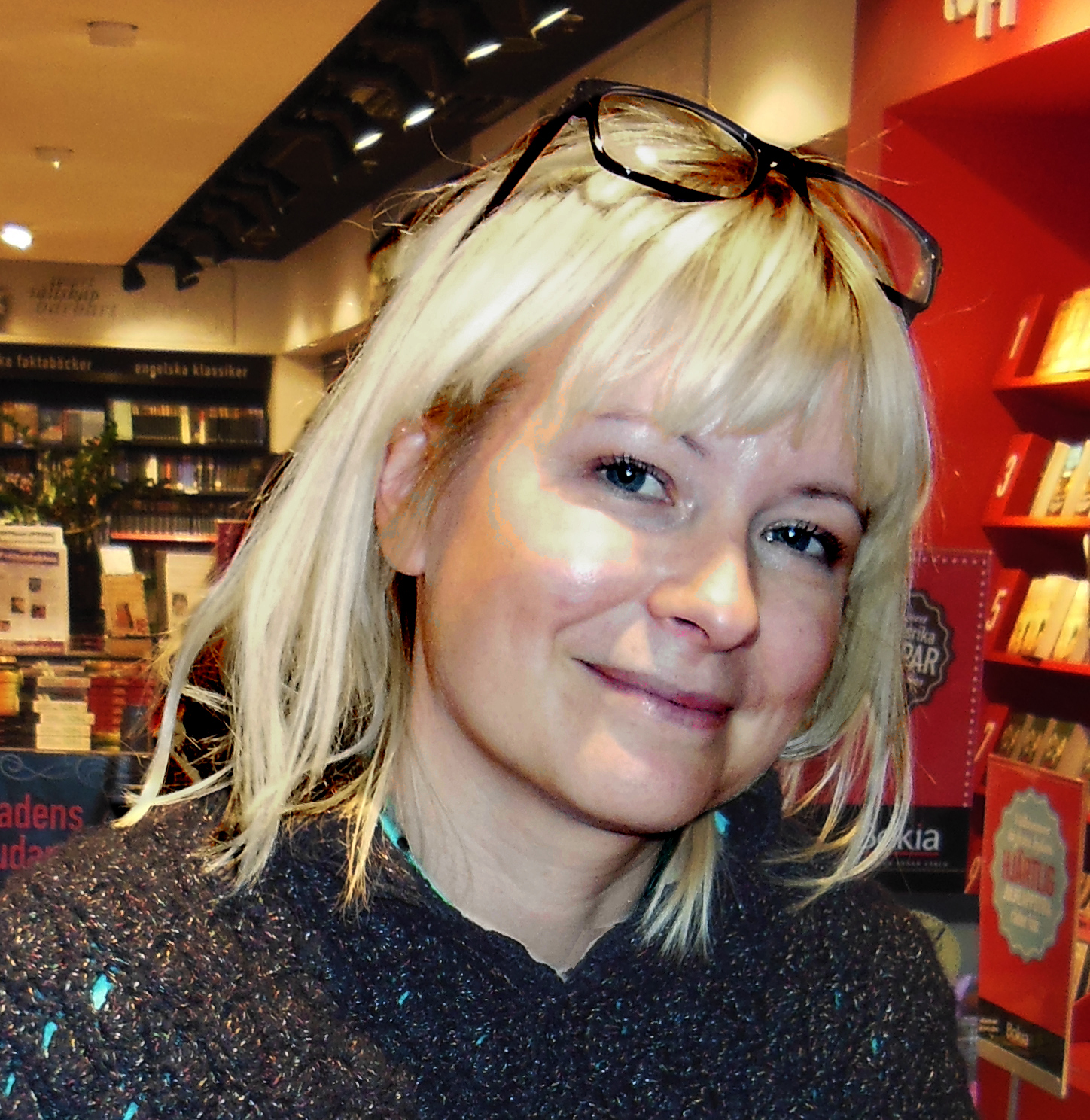
Josefine Sundström in 2012

Carola Josefine Sundström Lindberg (born 6 September 1976) is a Swedish television host, author and singer.

Sundström was born in Upplands Väsby. She participated in Melodifestivalen 1999 with the girl group Ai with the song "Bilder av dig". The same year she started working for SVT and hosted the musicvideo show Voxpop for several years and she also hosted Melodifestivalen 2001. She also hosted Lilla Melodifestivalen 2002 on SVT.

Sundström was the Swedish commentator during the Eurovision Song Contest 2013 broadcast on SVT. Sundström was the Swedish spokesperson at Eurovision Song Contest 2001 and announced the countries voting result. Sundström is also an author having released two books, Vinteräpplen in 2010 and Boel och Oscar in 2012.

== TV shows ==
- 1997–1999 – Bingolotto, TV 4 (acting as "Bingo-Berra")
- 1999–2002 – Voxpop / Voxtop, SVT
- 2001 – Melodifestivalen, SVT (Host)
- 2000–2001 – Jukebox, SVT (host)
- 2002 – Junior-Jeopardy!, TV 4
- 2002 – Diggiloo, SVT (Guest in 2002)
- 2003 – När & fjärran, TV 4
- DunkaDunka, TV 4
- 2003–2005 – Combo, SVT
- 2004 – Säpop, SVT
- 2005 – Klara, färdiga, gå!
- 2007 – Lilla Melodifestivalen, SVT (host)
- 2008 – Stjärnor på is, TV4 (participant)

== Bibliography ==
- Vinteräpplen – 2010 ISBN 9789187885044
- Boel och Oscar – 2012 ISBN 9789187885075
