= Tooji =

Norwegian singer

- Also known as: Tooji
- Born: Touraj Keshtkar; 26 May 1987 (age 39); Shiraz, Iran
- Origin: Norway
- Genres: Pop; Dance; House; Electronic
- Occupations: Singer, model, television host, social worker
- Years active: 2008–2015

Japanese stage name
- Kanji: 冬至
- Romanization: tōji
- Literal meaning: winter solstice

Touraj Keshtkar (Persian: تورج کشتکار; born 26 May 1987), known professionally as Tooji, is an Iranian-born Norwegian singer, painter, model and television host. He represented Norway in the Eurovision Song Contest 2012 in Baku, Azerbaijan and finished 26th (last) in the final.

== Career ==
Tooji Keshtkar was born in Shiraz, Iran, and moved to Norway when he was one year old. His mother is author and political commentator Lily Bandehy. At the age of 16, he started modelling. Afterwards, he started working on MTV Norway where he presented "Super Saturday" and "Tooji's Top 10". He was also educated as a social worker and has worked in asylum reception centres.

He won Melodi Grand Prix 2012 and was given the opportunity to represent Norway in the Eurovision Song Contest 2012 in Baku, Azerbaijan with his entry "Stay."

From 2012 to 2022, Tooji presented, with Margrethe Røed, the Melodi Grand Prix Junior in Norway. In 2013, he released a single entitled "Rebels". Tooji himself describes ‘Rebels’ as "dramatic pop-dance, with new organic elements blended in with hard electronica".

He moved to Stockholm prior to the release of the song "Packin' Guns". His songs often express a political and social message. Tooji's single "Cocktail" deals with the gender roles in today's society. The music video starts with a quotation from Gloria Steinem: "We've begun to raise daughters more like sons... but few have the courage to raise our sons more like our daughters". After coming out, he released his The Father project. Tooji's single and EP Father emanating from the project is about sexual relationships in the church and the hypocrisy in the public positions of the church. The music video for his following single "Say Yeah" tackles homophobic hate crimes.

=== The Father Project and single ===
His EP and single "Father" was part of his coming out process by tackling the subject of sex and the church. The music video, filmed inside an Oslo church, received criticism. Ole Christian Kvarme, the Bishop of Oslo of the Lutheran Church of Norway, condemned the video as "totally unacceptable" and "a gross misuse of the church", accusing the video's producers of misinforming the church's administration prior to filming about the video's actual contents.

Tooji said he lost his job as a host to Melodi Grand Prix Junior, a version of Eurovision for younger performers as a result of the "Father" video and the Father Project. Tooji called this project as "the most important thing I've done in my life."

== Personal life ==
Tooji is a supporter of Green Wave, Iran's democratic reform movement. Tooji wore a Free Iran green bracelet during his performance in the Eurovision Song Contest 2012 held in Baku, Azerbaijan.

In June 2015, Tooji came out as gay to the Norwegian website Gaysir, stating that he hoped he could make it easier for young gay people by being open about his own sexuality. He was praised for his decision by the Norwegian National Association for Lesbians, Gays, Bisexuals and Transgender People.

== Discography ==
=== Extended plays ===
Title	Details
Stay	Released: 16 January 2012; Format: Digital download; Label: Tooji Music
Father	Released: 20 May 2015; Format: Digital download; Label: Kawaii Records

=== Singles ===
Title	Year	Peak chart positions	Album
Title	Year	NOR	Album
"Swan Song"	2008	—	Non-album singles
"Stay"	2012	2	Stay
"If It Wasn't For You"	2012	—	Stay
"Rebels"	2013	—	Non-album singles
"Packin' Guns"	2014	—	Non-album singles
"Cocktail"	2014	—	Non-album singles
"Money"	2015	—	Non-album singles
"L.Y.S"	2015	—	Non-album singles
"Father"	2015	—	Father
"Say Yeah"	2015	—	Non-album singles
"—" denotes a single that did not chart or was not released.

Awards and achievements
Preceded by Stella Mwangi with "Haba Haba"	Norway in the Eurovision Song Contest; 2012	Succeeded by Margaret Berger with "I Feed You My Love"
