= Bilder av dig =

"Bilder av dug"

Single by Ai
- Released: 27 February 1999
- Label: Pool Sounds
- Songwriter: Stephan Berg

"Bilder av dig" (English: "Visions of you") is a song by Swedish pop group Ai, released as a single on 27 February, 1999. It was performed in Melodifestivalen 1999.

== Charts ==
Chart performance for "Bilder av dig"
| Chart (2024) | Peak position |
|---|---|
| Sweden (Sverigetopplistan) | 41 |
