= WeMix =

WEMIX
- Company type: Private
- Website type: Social network service, online audio platform
- Available in: English
- Founded: New York, New York (2007)
- Headquarters: New York, New York, U.S.
- Area served: Worldwide
- Key people: Ludacris (creator), Matthew Apfel
- Registration: Not required
- Users: 67,848 (October 2010)
- Launched: April 2008
- Current status: Closed

WeMix was an online music creation community and user-generated record label founded in 2007 by hip-hop musician and actor Christopher "Ludacris" Bridges and reality TV show producer Matt Apfel. It was a privately held joint venture between Ludacris’ Disturbing tha Peace label and MegaMobile TV (a company founded by Apfel). The site was a social network that featured a content browsing/filtering structure similar to YouTube. WeMix allowed artists to interact, share their music, give feedback, and collaborate with other artists. The site was free to all users and had an internet-advertising business model.

In December 2011, the website underwent maintenance and has not been active since.
