= Stian Barsnes-Simonsen =

Norwegian actor and television presenter

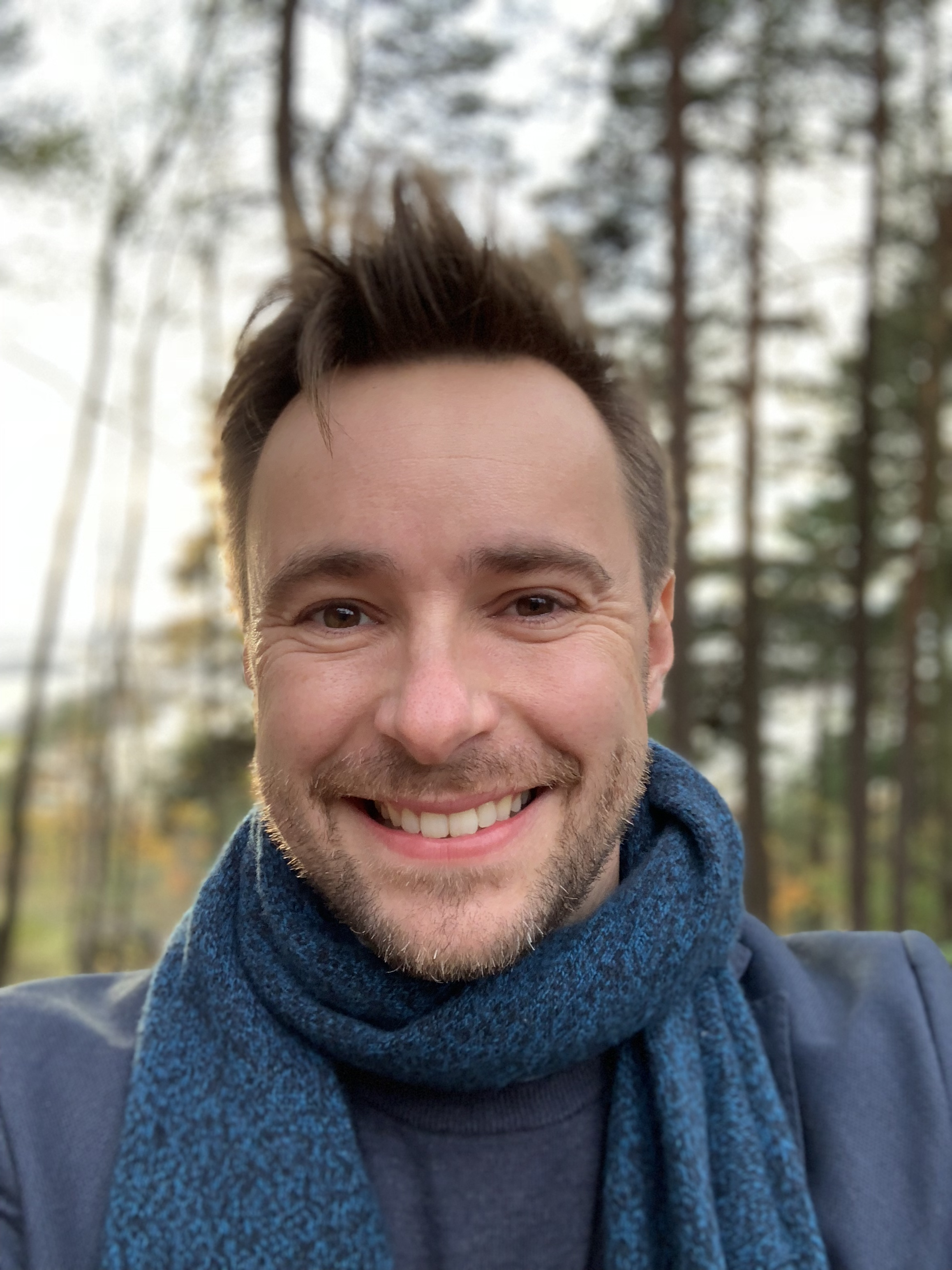
- Simonsen in 2018
- Born: 20 April 1979 (age 46); Bergen, Norway
- Occupations: Actor and television host
- Years active: 1998–present

Stian Barsnes-Simonsen (born 20 April 1979, in Bergen) is a Norwegian actor and television host of Amigo, Midt i smørøyet and Melodi Grand Prix.

== Filmography ==
=== Television ===
Presenter

- De ukjente (2009)
- Gullruten (2006)
- Melodi Grand Prix 2006 and 2007 (with Synnøve Svabø)
- Junior Eurovision Song Contest 2004 (with Nadia Hasnaoui)
- Smørøyet (1998)
- Melodi Grand Prix Junior 2002 (with Thomas Numme)
- Melodi Grand Prix Junior 2003
- Melodi Grand Prix Junior 2004, Melodi Grand Prix Junior 2005 and Melodi Grand Prix Junior 2006 (with Nadia Hasnaoui)
- Melodi Grand Prix Junior 2007
- Melodi Grand Prix Junior 2008
- MGP Nordic 2007 (with Nadia Hasnaoui)
- MGP Nordic 2002 (with Camilla Ottesen, Josefine Sundström)
- Eurovision Song Contest 2008 (as spokesperson for Norway).
- Eurovision Song Contest 2009 (as spokesperson for Norway).

=== Acting ===
- Hotel Cæsar (1998–2000, television series)
- Bølgene (English title: Waves, 1998)
- Kysset som fikk snøen til å smelte (English title: A Kiss in the Snow, 1997)

== Bibliography ==
- How to be ungdom (2004, Aschehoug)
- En faktahest om forelskelse (-og kyssing) (2008, Aschehoug)
- Gnøkkel og Fnøkkel og det synkende tonometer (2014, Aschehoug)

Preceded by (Denmark) Camilla Ottesen and Remee	Junior Eurovision Song Contest presenter 2004; With: Nadia Hasnaoui	Succeeded by (Belgium) Maureen Louys and Marcel Vanthilt
