= Melodi Grand Prix Junior 2002 =

Norwegian television song competition

Date and venue
- Final: 22 February 2002
- Venue: Oslo Spektrum; Oslo, Norway

Organisation
- Broadcaster: Norsk rikskringkasting (NRK)
- Presenters: Thomas Numme; Stian Barsnes-Simonsen

Participants
- Number of entries: 10

Vote
- Voting system: Televoting, the winner is the one with most votes
- Winning song: "Paybacktime" by To små karer

Melodi Grand Prix Junior 2002 was the first ever music competition in Norway in the series Melodi Grand Prix Junior for children between the ages of 8 and 15. The winners were To små karer (meaning two little guys) with the song "Paybacktime". They represented Norway in MGP Nordic (Melodi Grand Prix Nordic 2002) held in Denmark together with the second-placed Wicked Instinct and third-placed Black Jackets. Program presenter was Thomas Numme, while Stian Barsnes Simonsen was backstage.

There were 10 participants, including three bands, three girl groups, three solo artists and one duo.

The album Melodi Grand Prix Junior 2002 containing the songs of the 10 finalists reached #4 on the VG-lista Norwegian Albums Chart on weeks 10 and 11 of 2002 staying at #4, with the album staying a total of 10 weeks in the charts.

== Results ==
No.	Artist	Song	Position	Points
01	Popzy	"Teite foreldre"	8	20
02	Adele Erichsen	"Vær deg sjøl"	4	31
03	Black Jackets	"Aldri mer"	3	36
04	Charite Viken Reinås	"Når hjertet mitt banker"	7	23
05	Utrygg is	"Fragmenta"	4	31
06	To små karer	"Paybacktime"	1	52
07	Mabelin	"Det var en gang"	10	10
08	Stefan "Stiffi" Ramstad	"Respekt"	6	29
09	Wicked Instinct	"Eg e'kkje aleine"	2	46
10	Slush	"Febersky"	9	12
