= Malin Reitan =

Norwegian singer (born 1995)

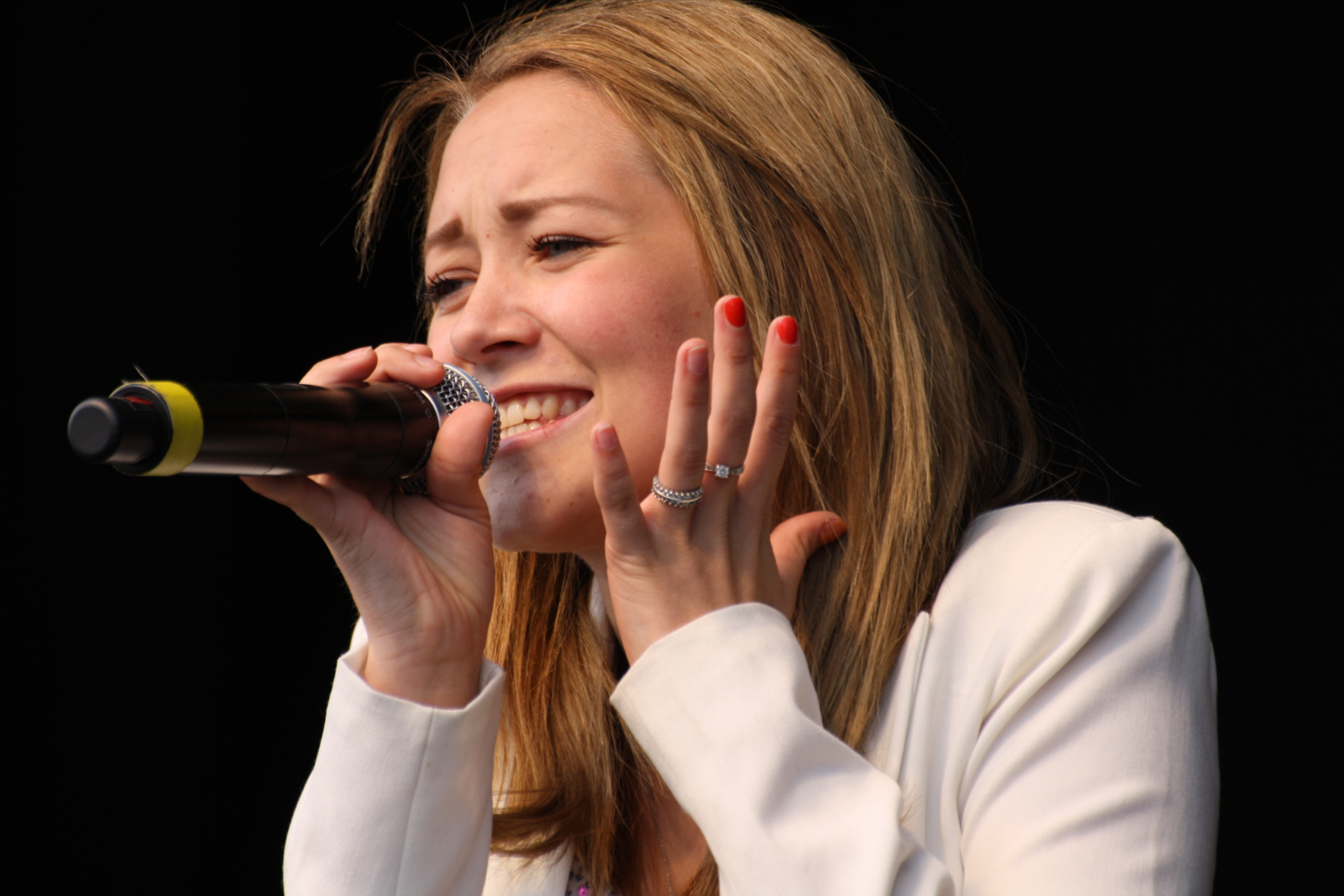
- Malin Reitan (2011)

Background information
- Born: Malin Reitan; 8 August 1995 (age 31); Trondheim, Norway
- Genres: Pop, children
- Occupation: Singer
- Years active: 2005–2012
- Label: MBO MBN

Malin (born Malin Reitan; 8 August 1995) is a Norwegian singer. She finished 3rd in the Junior Eurovision Song Contest 2005 with her song "Sommer og skolefri". She is also a recording artist with several released albums. Malin sings in her regional dialect.

== Biography ==
Reitan was born in Trondheim, and her career as a singer started when she was nine years old. She auditioned for the Norwegian selection for JESC 2005, the Melodi Grand Prix Junior 2005, and she was selected to sing among ten contestants in the final show. Her song was too short though, so she had to write one more verse for it on the way home from the audition. After surprising herself by winning MGP Jr by a landslide, she went on a summer concert tour, singing at festivals and on television shows. In November, she performed in the JESC 2005 in Hasselt, Belgium and finished 3rd, the best position for Norway so far.

The following year, Malin signed a record deal and in 2006 she released two albums. Malin på månen was released in May, a children's album that includes "Sommer og skolefri" and she participated in writing most of the original songs on it. Malin's jul is a Christmas album with familiar Christmas songs. Her third album Pang was released in April 2008, and was certified gold in a few weeks.

In October 2011, it was announced that Malin would compete in the adult version of Melodi Grand Prix in 2012. In the semi-final, she finished third and made it to the national final with the song "Crush".

== Discography ==
Year	Information	Chart positions NOR	Sales and certifications
2006	På månen...: First studio album; Released: 8 May 2006; Format: CD, digital download	6	
2006	Malin's Jul: Second studio album; Released: 27 November 2006; Formats: CD, digital download	12	
2008	Pang!: Third studio album; Released: 16 April 2008; Formats: CD	5	
2009	Malin: Fourth studio album; Released: 2 November 2009; Formats: CD, digital download	22	
2010	Julekonserten (with Celine): Fifth studio album; Released: 8 November 2010; Formats: CD, digital download	17	
2011	Paradis: Sixth studio album; Released: 1 April 2011; Formats: CD, digital download	29	

=== Singles ===
Year	Single	Peak positions		Certification
Year	Single	NOR	DEN	Certification
2012	"Crush"	9	20	

Awards and achievements
Preceded by @lek with "En stjerne skal jeg bli"	Norway in the Junior Eurovision Song Contest; 2005	Succeeded by -
