= MGP Nordic 2006 =

Song competition

Date and venue
- Final: 25 November 2006
- Venue: SVT Television Centre; Stockholm, Sweden

Organisation
- Broadcaster: Sveriges Television (SVT)
- Presenters: Therese Merkel; Henrik Johnsson

Participants
- Number of entries: 9 entries, 3 from each Scandinavian country

Vote
- Voting system: Points are given depending on the percentage of the vote received by each country
- Winning song: Denmark "Tro på os to"

The 2nd MGP Nordic was held in Stockholm, Sweden in November 2006. This was the first time in four years that MGP Nordic took place after Denmark, Swedish broadcaster SVT, and Norway pulled out of the Junior Eurovision Song Contest that same year as a protest against the excess pressure put on the singers. Sweden did, however, compete at Junior Eurovision with different contestants and TV4 as the broadcaster from 2006 to 2009 despite withdrawing in 2008.

== Organization ==
Following all three countries' withdrawal from the Junior Eurovision Song Contest, MGP Nordic was revived after a three-year hiatus but with minor changes. Jury voting was removed and one song from each country moved on to the super final and were performed again. The overall winner reprised their song at the end while the credits rolled.

== National selections ==
- Norway decided: 22 April 2006
- Denmark decided: 16 September 2006
- Sweden decided: 6 October 2006

== Participating countries ==
Participants of MGP Nordic 2006
Country	Broadcaster	Artist	Song	Language	Songwriter(s)
Denmark	DR	Foz'n's	"Mit hood"	Danish (Note: "Mit hood" and "Få din boogie på" contain some words in English)	Mark Fosnæs
Denmark	DR	WeMix	"Få din boogie på"	Danish	Rami El-Daoud; Simon Opalka
Denmark	DR	SEB	"Tro på os to"	Danish	Sebastian Nielsen
Norway	NRK	Drops	"Sjokoland"	Norwegian	Christine Nesøen; Fride Amundsen
Norway	NRK	Sondre	"Tatt"	Norwegian	Sondre Pettersen
Norway	NRK	Ole Runar	"Fotball e supert"	Norwegian	Ole Runar Gillebo
Sweden	SVT	Benjamin	"Hej Sofia"	Swedish	Benjamin Ingrosso
Sweden	SVT	Sanna	"Genom skog, berg, och hav"	Swedish	Sanna Martinez-Matz
Sweden	SVT	MaDe	"Inga känslor kvar"	Swedish	Mathilda Glansk; Sara Denise Colbrand

=== Denmark ===
- Foz'n's, aged 13 to 15 at the time of the contest, is made up of lead singer Mark Fosnæs and backing dancers Mie Ranum and Karina Fosnæs; the latter is Mark's sister. "Mit mood" was written by Mark himself.
- WeMix consists of two boys and two girls, all aged 11 to 15 during the contest. The group is made of rappers Simon Opalka and Rami El-Daoud with sisters Sofie and Amalie Jacobsen as backing dancers. This is not to be confused with the now-extinct online music creation community of the same name, which launched in 2008.
- SEB is a pop-rock band featuring lead singer and guitarist Sebastian Nielsen, bassist Magnus Kaiser, and drummer Mathias Okholm.

=== Norway ===
- Drops is a singing duo featuring Fride Amundsen and Christine Nesøen.
- Not much is known about then-15-year-old Sondre Pettersen or his song "Tatt".
- Ole Runar Gillebo was born in early spring 1996 and lives in Kyrksæterøra. "Fotball e supert" is about his love for football.

=== Sweden ===
- Benjamin Ingrosso was born in September 1997 and lives in Danderyd, near Stockholm. "Hej Sofia" is about an Italian girl who Benjamin has a crush on and flies over to Italy to see her. Ingrosso later represented Sweden in the Eurovision Song Contest 2018 with the song "Dance You Off".
- Sanna Martinez-Matz was born in May 1996 and lives in Alnön. "Genom skog, berg, och hav" is about embarking on an important mission to find a missing diamond.
- MaDe is a duo containing Mathilda Glansk and Sara Denise Colbrand. Although "Inga känslor kvar" was written by the girls themselves, not much is known about the lyrical content.

== Results ==
=== First round ===
Draw	Country	Artist	Song	Result
1	Norway	Drops	"Sjokoland"	Out
2	Denmark	Foz'n's	"Mit hood"	Out
3	Sweden	Benjamin	"Hej Sofia"	Out
4	Norway	Sondre	"Tatt"	Out
5	Denmark	WeMix	"Få din boogie på"	Out
6	Sweden	Sanna	"Genom skog, berg, och hav"	Super-final
7	Norway	Ole Runar	"Fotball e supert"	Super-final
8	Denmark	SEB	"Tro på os to"	Super-final
9	Sweden	MaDe	"Inga känslor kvar"	Out

=== Super Final ===
Draw	Country	Artist	Song	Points	Place
1	Sweden	Sanna	"Genom skog, berg, och hav"	117	2
2	Norway	Ole Runar	"Fotball e supert"	56	3
3	Denmark	SEB	"Tro på os to"	127	1

== Voting ==
		Televoting Results			
		Total Score	Denmark	Norway	Sweden
Contestants	(Denmark) SEB	127	X	56	71
Contestants	(Norway) Ole Runar	56	27	X	29
Contestants	(Sweden) Sanna	117	73	44	X
