= Camilla Ottesen =

Danish television presenter

Camilla Ottesen (born 11 November 1972) is a Danish television presenter, notable for having hosted the first Junior Eurovision Song Contest in 2003 with Remee. She won the 2003 Danish TV Manufacturers' Assocociation's award for best presenter in children's and youth programming.

Preceded by None (first contest)	Junior Eurovision Song Contest presenter 2003; With: Remee	Succeeded by (Norway) Nadia Hasnaoui and Stian Barsnes Simonsen
