= MGP Nordic 2009 =

Song competition

Date and venue
- Final: 28 November 2009
- Venue: SVT Television Centre; Stockholm, Sweden

Organisation
- Broadcaster: Sveriges Television (SVT)
- Presenter: Ola Lindholm

Participants
- Number of entries: 8 entries, 2 from each Scandinavian country

Vote
- Voting system: Points are given depending on which placing each country got in each others votings, 1st place receiving 12 points, 2nd place 8 points and 3rd place 6 points. Each country can not vote for themselves.
- Winning song: Sweden "En vanlig dag"

Melodi Grand Prix Nordic 2009 was the fifth and final MGP Nordic, a Scandinavian song contest for children aged 8 to 15. The contest was held on November 28, 2009 in Stockholm, Sweden, with Norway, Denmark, Finland and Sweden participating. Each country submitted two songs to participate in the first round with the top placing entry from each country proceeding to the super-final. The winner of MGP Nordic 2009 was host country Sweden's Ulrik Munther with "En vanlig dag".

== National selections ==
- Norway decided: 5 September 2009
- Denmark decided: 26 September 2009
- Sweden decided: 2 October 2009
- Finland decided: 9 October 2009

== Participating countries ==
Participants of MGP Nordic 2009
Country	Broadcaster	Artist	Song	Language	Songwriter(s)
Denmark	DR	PelleB	"Kun min"	Danish	Mathilde Christensen; Pelle Blarke
Denmark	DR	Engledrys	"Familien, min bedste ven"	Danish	Emma Aslking
Finland	Yle Fem	Amanda Sjöholm	"Jag vill leva"	Swedish	Amanda Sjöholm
Finland	Yle Fem	The Black White Boys	"Kommer du ihåg mig?"	Swedish	Oscar Nyholm
Norway	NRK	Jørgen Dahl Moe	"Din egen vei"	Norwegian	Jørgen Dahl Moe
Norway	NRK	Mystery	"Rock e sunt"	Norwegian	Bård-Åge Nyland Pedersen; Benjamin Olsvik Nilsson; Robin Richardsen; Sigve André Evensen Skaugvoll
Sweden	SVT	Ulrik Munther	"En vanlig dag"	Swedish	Ulrik Munther
Sweden	SVT	Rebecca Jansson	"Skaffa en annan tjej"	Swedish	Rebecca Jansson

=== Denmark ===
- Pelle Blarke, better known as PelleB, wrote "Kun min" alongside Mathilde Christensen, whom not much is known about. "Kun min" features guest vocals from then 14-year-old Freya Bertel.
- Engledrys is the moniker of then 8-year-old Emma Askling, along with two backup singers. "Familien, min bedste ven" was written by Emma herself.

=== Finland ===
- Amanda Sjöholm was born on New Year's Day 1997. "Jag vill leva" is self-written and is about how she wants to live a free life.
- Not much is known about The Black White Boys or their song "Kommer du ihåg mig?".

== Final ==
Each of the Scandinavian countries are represented by two artists. The artist with the most votes from each country proceeds to the Super Final.

The four artists with the most votes were Amanda from Finland, PelleB from Denmark, Jørgen from Norway and Ulrik from Sweden.

Draw	Country	Artist	Song	Result
1	Norway	Mystery	"Rock e sunt"	Out
2	Finland	Amanda Sjöholm	"Jag vill leva"	Super-final
3	Denmark	PelleB	"Kun min"	Super-final
4	Norway	Jørgen Dahl Moe	"Din egen vei"	Super-final
5	Finland	The Black White Boys	"Kommer du ihåg mig?"	Out
6	Sweden	Ulrik Munther	"En vanlig dag"	Super-final
7	Denmark	Engledrys	"Familien, min bedste ven"	Out
8	Sweden	Rebecca Jansson	"Skaffa en annan tjej"	Out

== Super-final ==
Each super finalist sang their songs again for the Scandinavian public. The viewers then voted for the second time whilst the second interval act took place, which was MGP Nordic 2008 winners The BlackSheeps. Sweden was the winner with 36 points, getting 12 points from the other three countries. Denmark was second, while Norway and Finland each got 20 points, thus being in the bottom two. Ulrik sang "En vanlig dag" once more while the credits rolled.

Draw	Country	Artist	Song	Points	Place
1	Finland	Amanda Sjöholm	"Jag vill leva"	20	4
2	Denmark	PelleB	"Kun min"	28	2
3	Norway	Jørgen Dahl Moe	"Din egen vei"	20	3
4	Sweden	Ulrik Munther	"En vanlig dag"	36	1

=== Voting ===
		Televoting Results				
		Total Score	Finland	Denmark	Norway	Sweden
Contestants	(Finland) Amanda Sjöholm	20		6	6	8
Contestants	(Denmark) PelleB	28	8		8	12
Contestants	(Norway) Jørgen Dahl Moe	20	6	8		6
Contestants	(Sweden) Ulrik Munther	36	12	12	12	
