= Celine Helgemo =

Norwegian singer-songwriter

- Born: Celine Solemsløkk Helgemo; 31 August 1995 (age 30); Orkdal Municipality, Norway
- Genres: Pop; children
- Occupation: Singer-songwriter
- Years active: 2007–present

Celine Solemsløkk Helgemo (born 31 August 1995) is a Norwegian singer and songwriter. She won a Norwegian song competition for kids MGPjr 2007 with her song "Bæstevænna" (translated as best friends) when she was 12 years old and has released a platinum-certified album.

Helgemo comes from Orkdal Municipality, near Trondheim. She goes to a local dance school, takes singing lessons and has performed in local plays with her friend. Helgemo likes to compose songs, and her winning song in MGP Nordic is about her best friend Astrid Smeplass.

She represented Norway in MGP Nordic 2007 after winning the local Norwegian qualifying competition Melodi Grand Prix Junior 2007

Helgemo also released an album of original songs just before the MGP Nordic final. One of the songs is a duet with her best friend Astrid. The album got a platinum certification in a month after its release.

== Discography ==
Albums

- Bæstevænna (2007)
- Jul på røros (2008)
- Jentekveld (2010)
- Julekonserten (2010) with Malin Reitan

Singles

- "I min verden" (2013)
- "Beating Me" (2018)
