= Margrethe Røed =

Norwegian television presenter (born 1976)

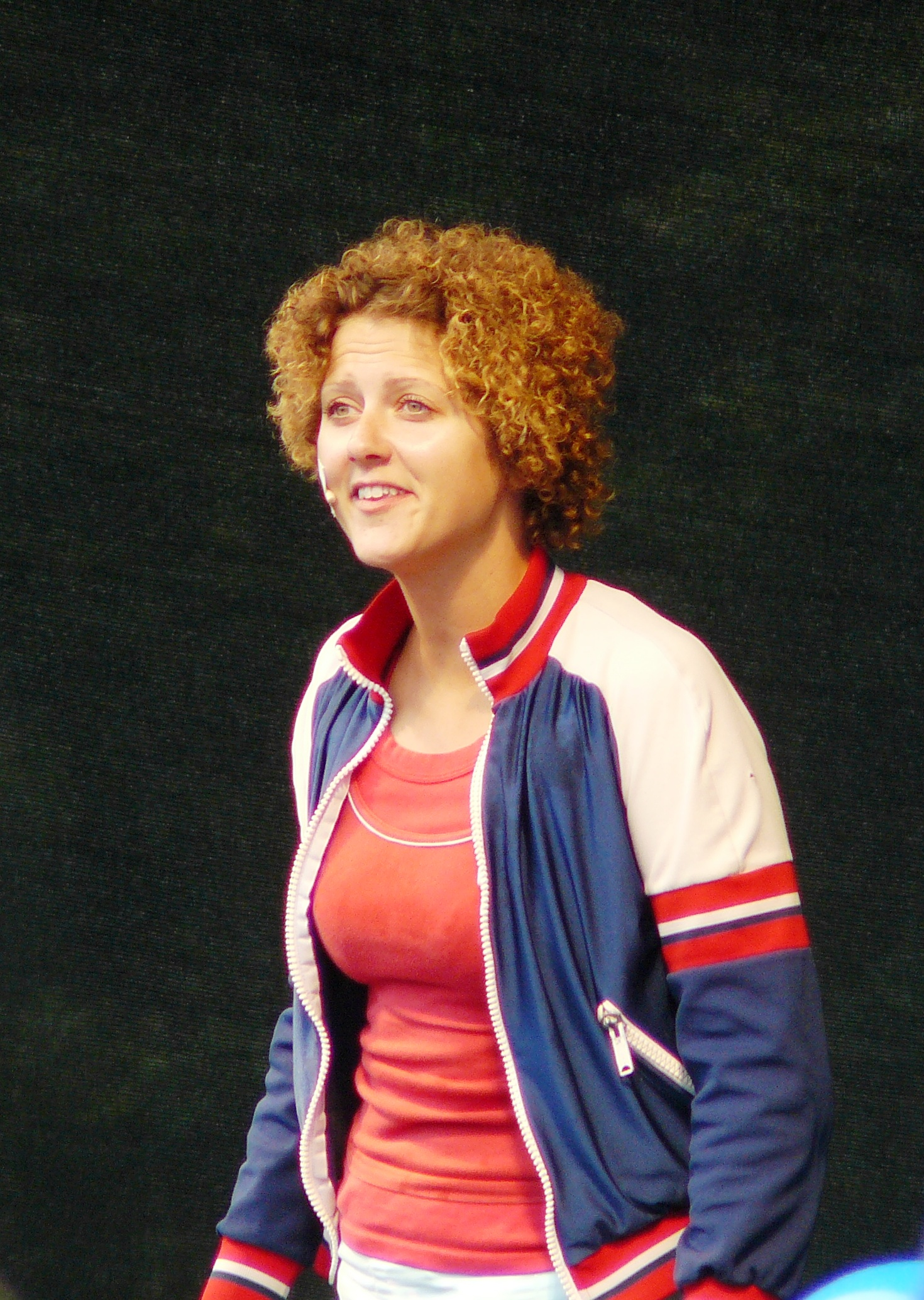
- Margrethe Røed (2007)
- Born: December 10, 1976 (age 48); Norway
- Occupation: Television presenter (NRK Super)

Margrethe Røed (born 10 December 1976) is a Norwegian television presenter on NRK Barne-TV and Super Barne-TV on the television and radio channel NRK Super.

In 2009, she took part in the TV programme Skal vi danse? on TV 2 with the dancer Asmund Grinaker.

Røed has also been on the television programmes Beat for beat and De ukjente. In 2009/10 she finally took maternity leave in the seventh month of pregnancy and returned with her son Cajus to show the TV audience.
