= Nadia Hasnaoui =

Norwegian television presenter (born 1963)

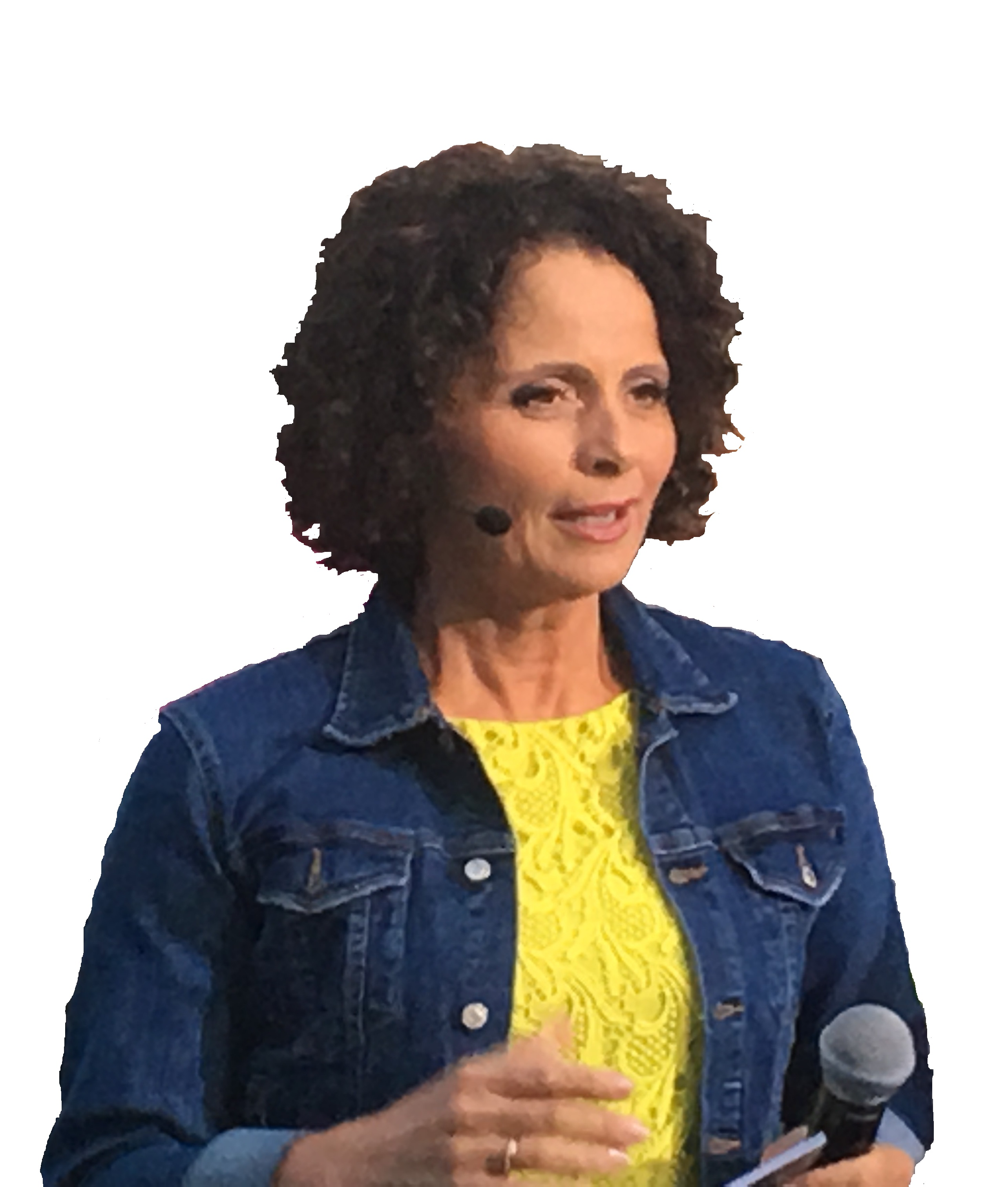
- Nadia Hasnaoui in July, 2016
- Born: 10 June 1963 (age 62); Morocco
- Occupations: Journalist, television presenter and former dancer
- Years active: 1980s–present
- Spouse: Kim Haugen (m. 1991)
- Children: 3
- Family: Ragnar Frisch (grandfather)

Nadia Hasnaoui (Arabic: نادية حسناوي; born 10 June 1963) is a Moroccan-born Norwegian television presenter.

== Biography ==
Hasnaoui was born in Morocco to a Norwegian mother and Moroccan father. Her maternal grandfather was Nobel Prize–winning economist Ragnar Frisch. When she was four years old her parents divorced and she moved to Norway with her mother. In Oslo she attended a strict Catholic French kindergarten and then later a French school until fourth grade. She became a Norwegian citizen at the age of eighteen. In 1991 she married actor Kim Haugen.

During the 1980s she was a dancer, among other places at Den Nationale Scene. She was an employee of TV2 from 1993 to 2004, hosting shows such as God morgen, Norge and Jakten på det gode liv. In 2003 she was host of the television show Hasnaoui. Hasnaoui has said she was at first amused by the opportunity as it was much like a Norwegian child in Morocco having a show there called "Olsen". In 2004 she joined the Norwegian Broadcasting Corporation, hosting shows such as Kvitt eller dobbelt and various shows related to the Eurovision Song Contest. She speaks English, French, Italian and Norwegian.

== Eurovision ==
Hasnaoui first became associated with Eurovision in 1992, when she provided the NRK radio commentary for the 1992 Contest.

In 2004, Hasnaoui presented the Junior Eurovision Song Contest 2004 in Lillehammer, Norway. Hasnaoui has also presented festivals in Norway such as Melodi Grand Prix Junior.

In 2005 Hasnaoui provided Norwegian commentary on the fiftieth anniversary special alongside former veteran Jahn Teigen.

Hasnaoui presented the Eurovision Song Contest 2010 in Bærum in May 2010 with Haddy Jatou N'jie and Erik Solbakken. She also read out the Norwegian votes for the 2011 and 2012 contests.

Preceded by (Russia) Semi-finals: Natalia Vodianova and Andrey Malahov; Final: Alsou and Ivan Urgant	Eurovision Song Contest presenter 2010; With: Haddy Jatou N'jie and Erik Solbakken	Succeeded by (Germany) Anke Engelke, Judith Rakers and Stefan Raab
Preceded by (Denmark) Camilla Ottesen and Remee	Junior Eurovision Song Contest presenter 2004; With: Stian Barsnes Simonsen	Succeeded by (Belgium) Maureen Louys and Marcel Vanthilt
