= 1957 in Norway =

- Centuries: 18th; 19th; 20th; 21st
- Decades: 1930s; 1940s; 1950s; 1960s; 1970s
- See also: List of years in Norway

Events in the year 1957 in Norway.

== Incumbents ==
- Monarch – Haakon VII (until September 21), then Olav V.
- Regent – Olav (until September 21)
- Prime Minister – Einar Gerhardsen (Labour Party)

== Events ==
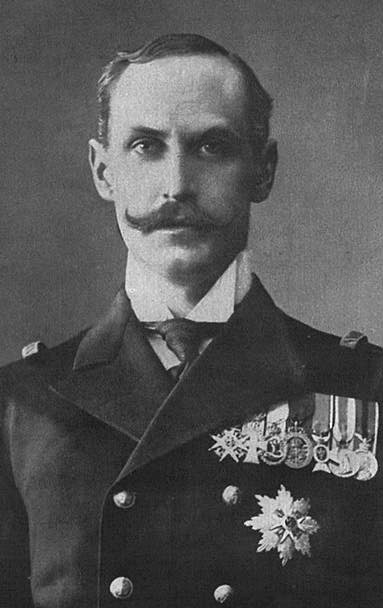
Haakon VII of Norway dies on 21 September.

- 16 March – The Kongsberg Silver Mines closes.
- 21 March – The Soviet Union threatened to use nuclear weapons if foreign military bases were established in Norway.
- 21 September – King Haakon VII dies, having reigned for nearly 52 years.
- 7 October – The 1957 Parliamentary election takes place.
- 16 December – During a NATO meeting in Paris, Prime Minister Einar Gerhardsen declares that Norway will not allow nuclear weapons or foreign bases on Norwegian soil.

=== Literature ===
- Fuglane, novel by Tarjei Vesaas
- Marens lille ugle (English: Maren's Little Owl), children's book by Finn Havrevold.

== Notable births ==
=== January ===
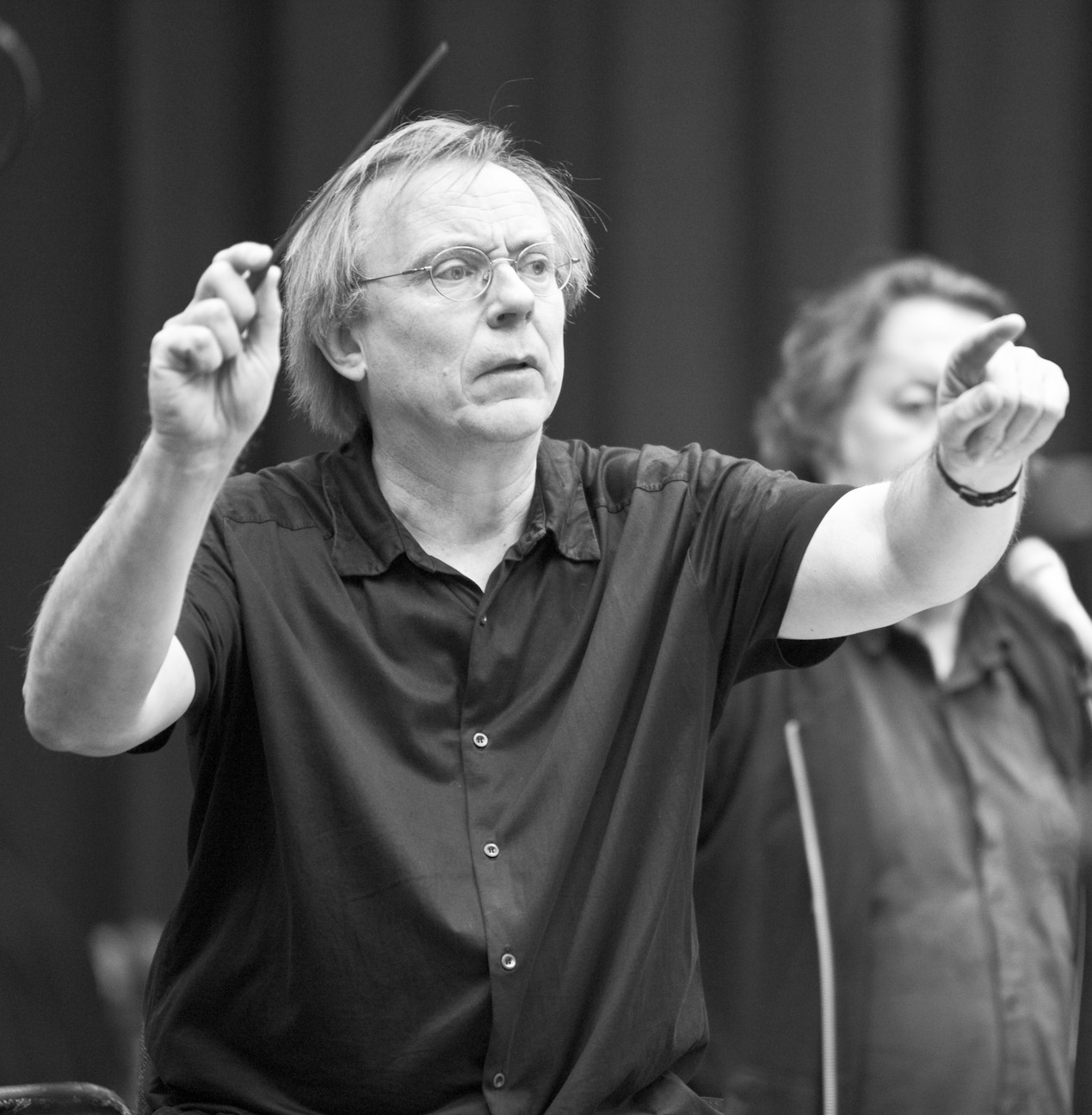
Christian Eggen

- 2 January – Haldis Lenes, competitive rower.
- 5 January –

- Torbjørn Andersen, politician
- Rolf Gramstad, speedway rider

- 8 January – Christian Eggen, composer, pianist and conductor.
- 11 January – Håvard Moen, footballer
- 30 January – Inger Lise Husøy, trade unionist and politician

=== February ===
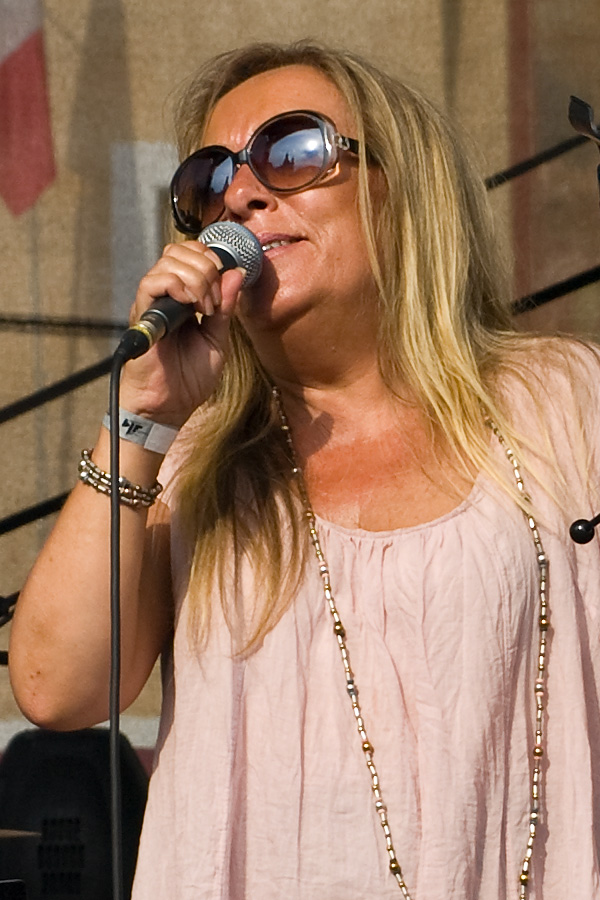
Inger Marie Gundersen

- 4 February – Anne Krigsvoll, actress.
- 6 February – Sven Nordin, actor
- 7 February – Knut Jøran Helmers, chess player
- 10 February – Hallvard Flatland, television presenter
- 11 February – Oddmund Finnseth, jazz musician
- 13 February – Inger Marie Gundersen, jazz vocalist
- 14 February – Terje Totland, high jumper

=== March ===
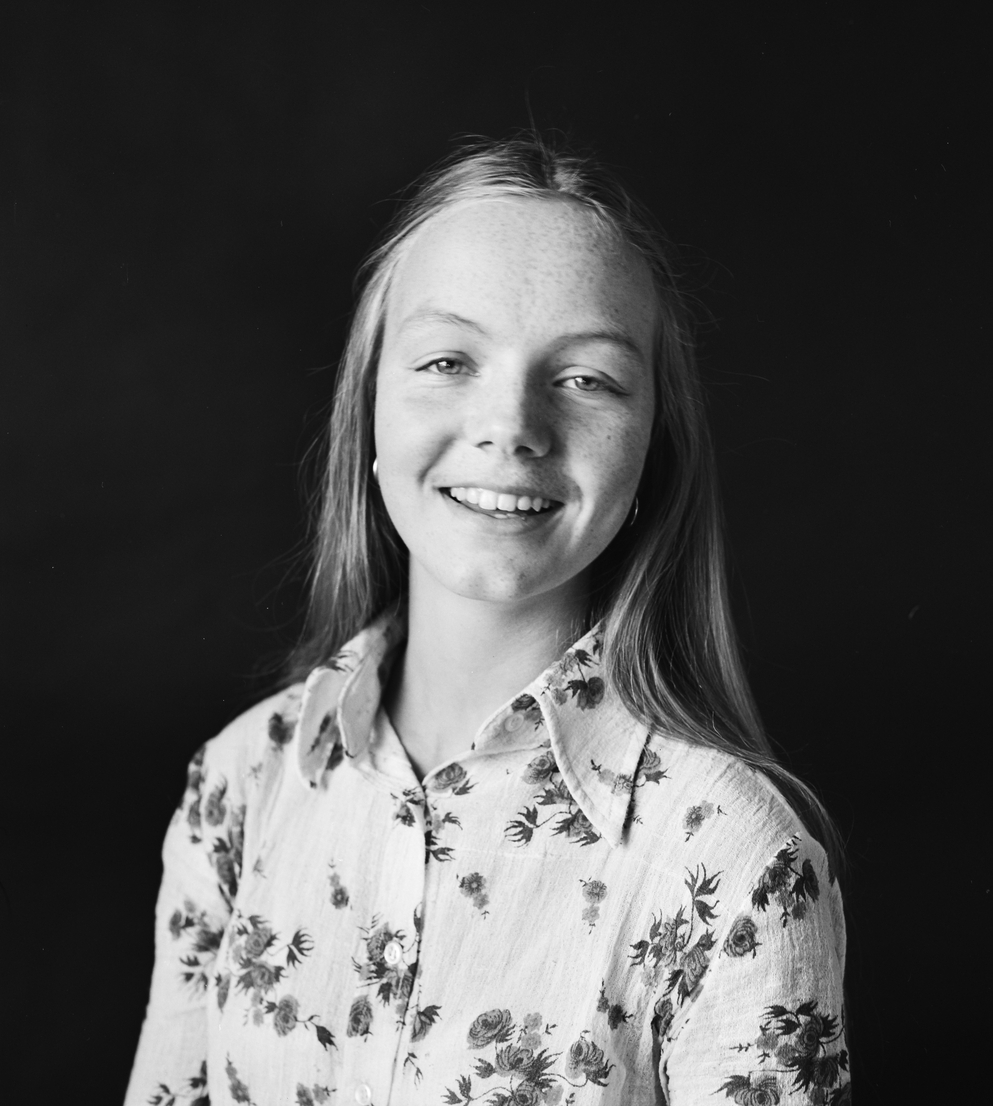
Mari Maurstad

- 1 March –

- Grete Brochmann, sociologist
- Olav Njølstad, historian.

- 3 March – Liv Bernhoft Osa, actress.
- 5 March – Per Roar Bredvold, politician
- 11 March – Per Barth Lilje, astronomer
- 15 March – Roger Albertsen, footballer (died 2003).
- 17 March – Mari Maurstad, actress.
- 19 March – Øystein Sevåg, musician
- 26 March – Randi Langøigjelten, middle-distance runner
- 28 March – Rune Ulvestad, footballer
- 29 March – Anne Grete Hollup, writer.

=== April ===
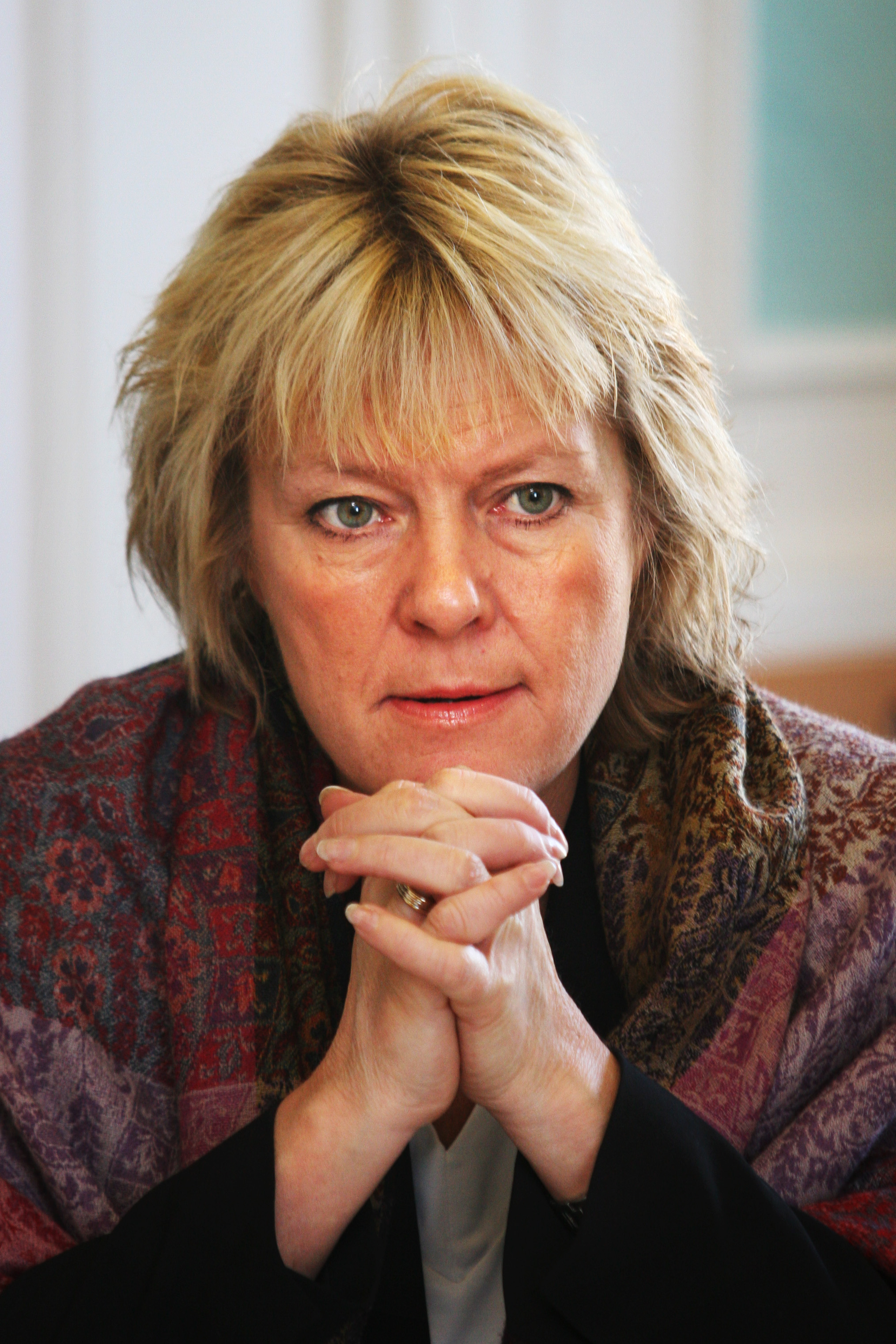
Kristin Clemet

- 3 April – Anne Krafft, visual artist
- 6 April – Terje Mikkelsen, conductor
- 9 April – Geir Borgan Paulsen, weightlifter
- 11 April – Bjørn Tronstad, footballer
- 12 April – Hallvar Thoresen, footballer.
- 14 April – Rolf Åge Berg, ski jumper
- 15 April – Thor Egil Olsen, coxswain
- 20 April –

- Kristin Clemet, politician and Minister.
- Dag Vidar Kristoffersen, footballer

- 22 April – Lene Jenssen, competitive swimmer.
- 23 April –

- Jarl Goli, actor, painter and television personality
- Hege Peikli, cross-country skier.

=== May ===
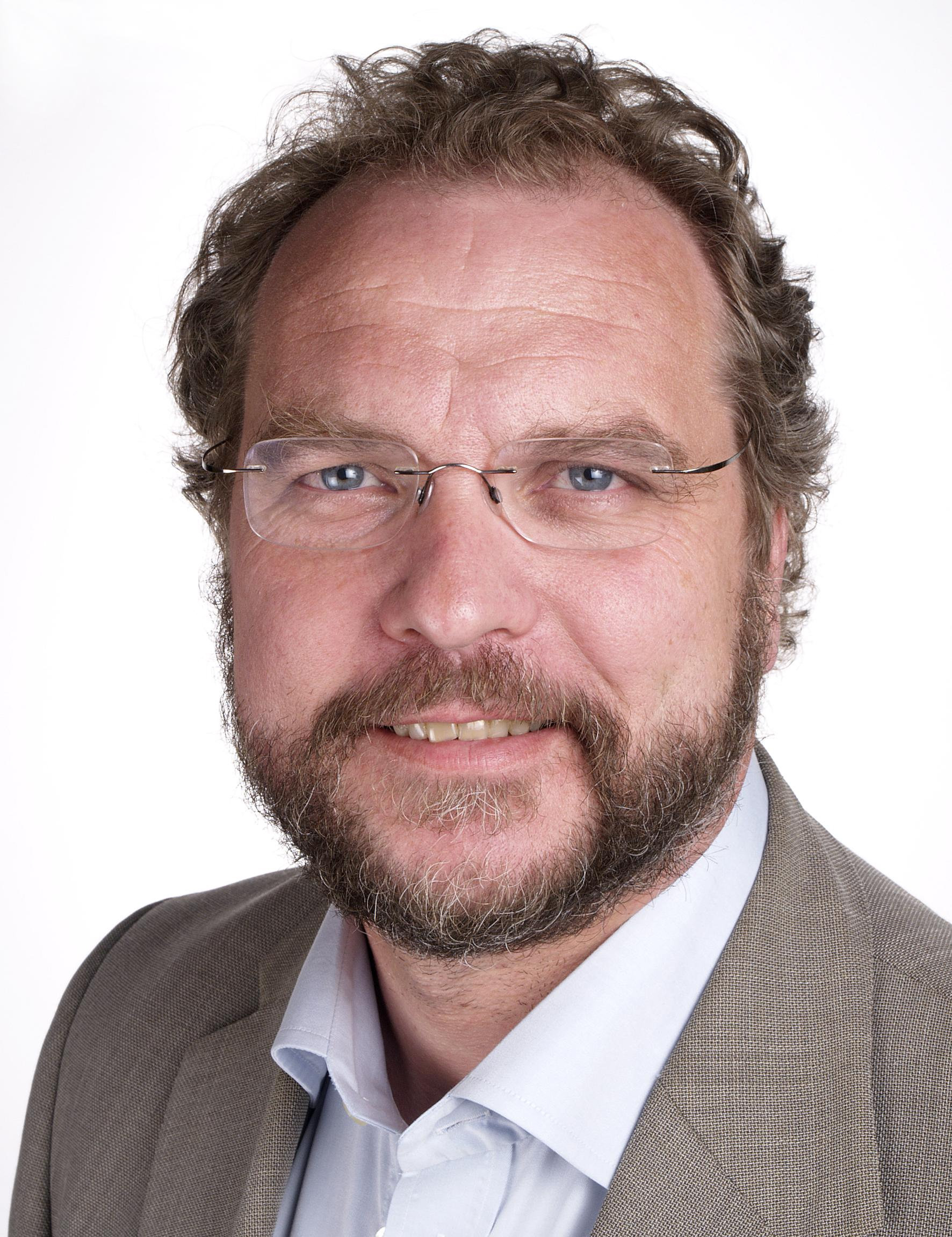
Lars Sponheim

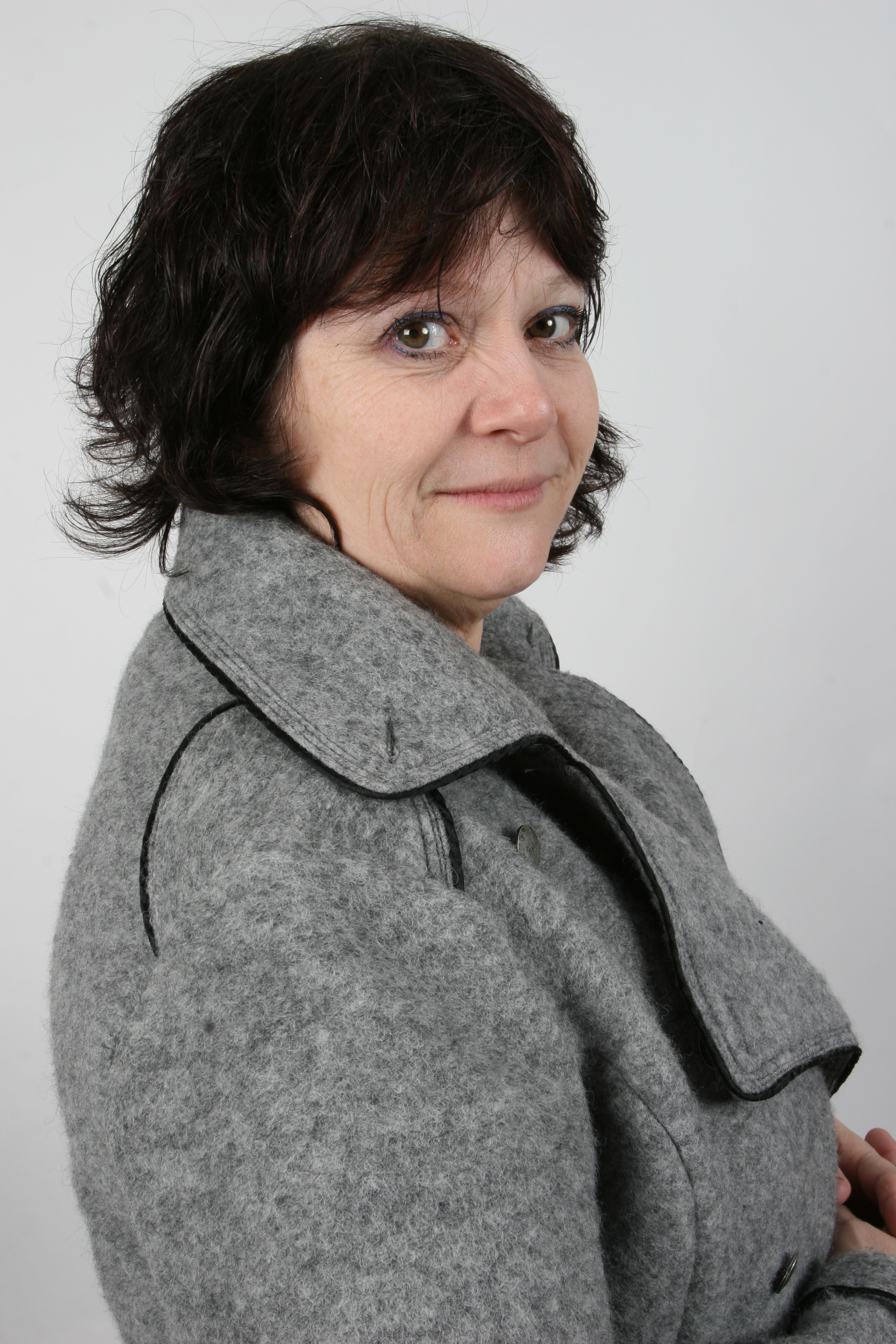
Ingebjørg Godskesen

- 4 May – Jarle Halsnes, alpine skier.
- 5 May –

- Gene Dalby, poet
- Siri Hatlen, businesswoman

- 11 May –

- Niels Fredrik Dahl, novelist, poet and playwright.
- Synnøve Solbakken, politician

- 17 May –

- Lillian Hansen, politician
- Arne Nygaard, organizational theorist

- 22 May –

- Anne Grete Preus, singer (died 2019)
- Hege Schøyen, singer, actor and comedian

- 23 May – Lars Sponheim, politician
- 26 May – Ingebjørg Godskesen, politician
- 27 May – Dag Terje Andersen, politician
- 31 May – Ole Christian Bach, con artist (died 2005)

=== June ===
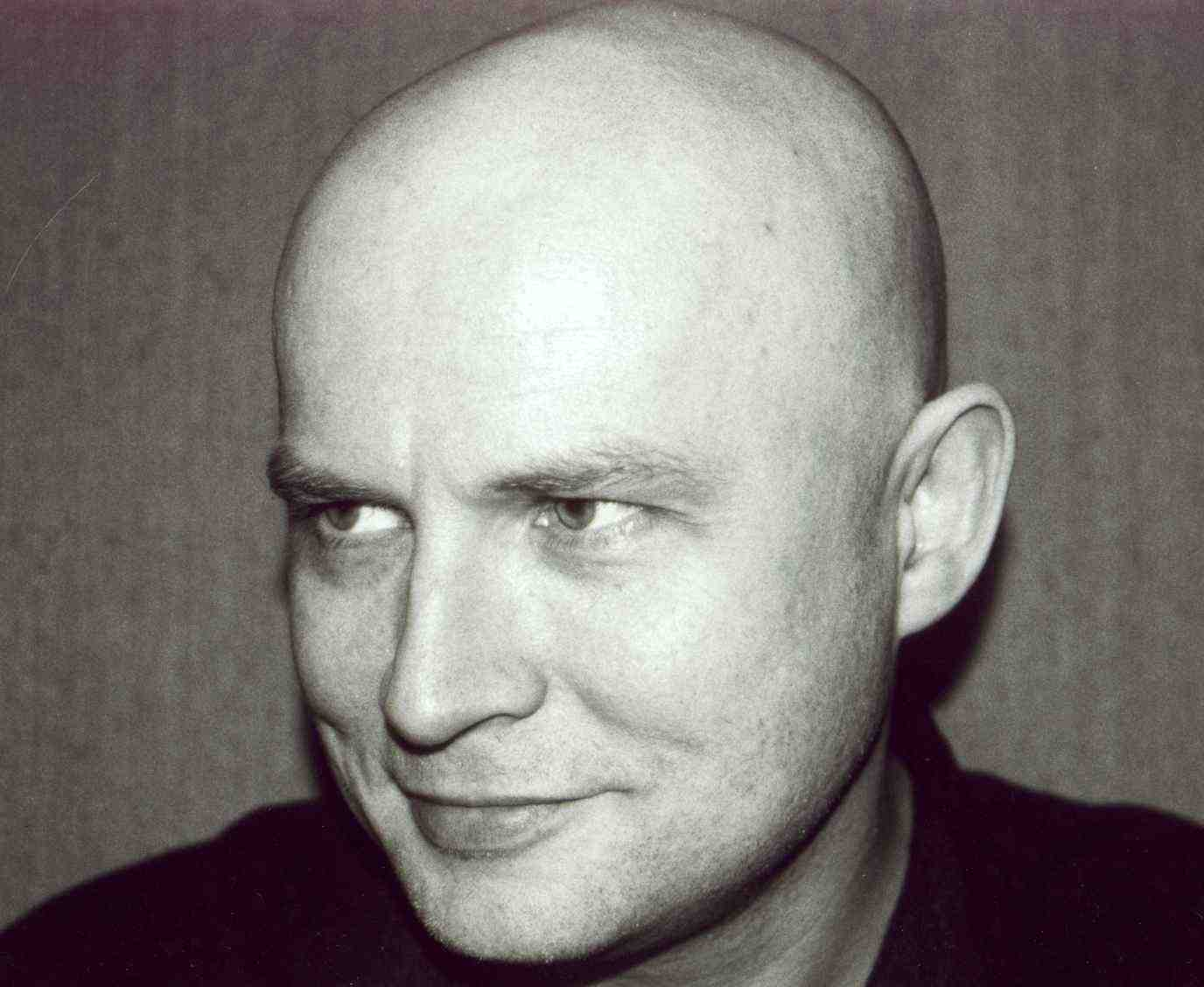
Jon Ewo

- 13 June – Anne Berit Eid, orienteering competitor.
- 19 June – Eirik Ildahl, comics writer, scriptwriter, playwright and novelist
- 21 June – Kjell Søbak, biathlete
- 22 June – Atle Torbjørn Karlsvik, naval officer
- 25 June – Eddie Kalleklev, sprint canoer
- 26 June – Astrid Tveit, high jumper
- 28 June – Dag Mejdell, businessman.
- 29 June – Jon Ewo, writer.

=== July ===
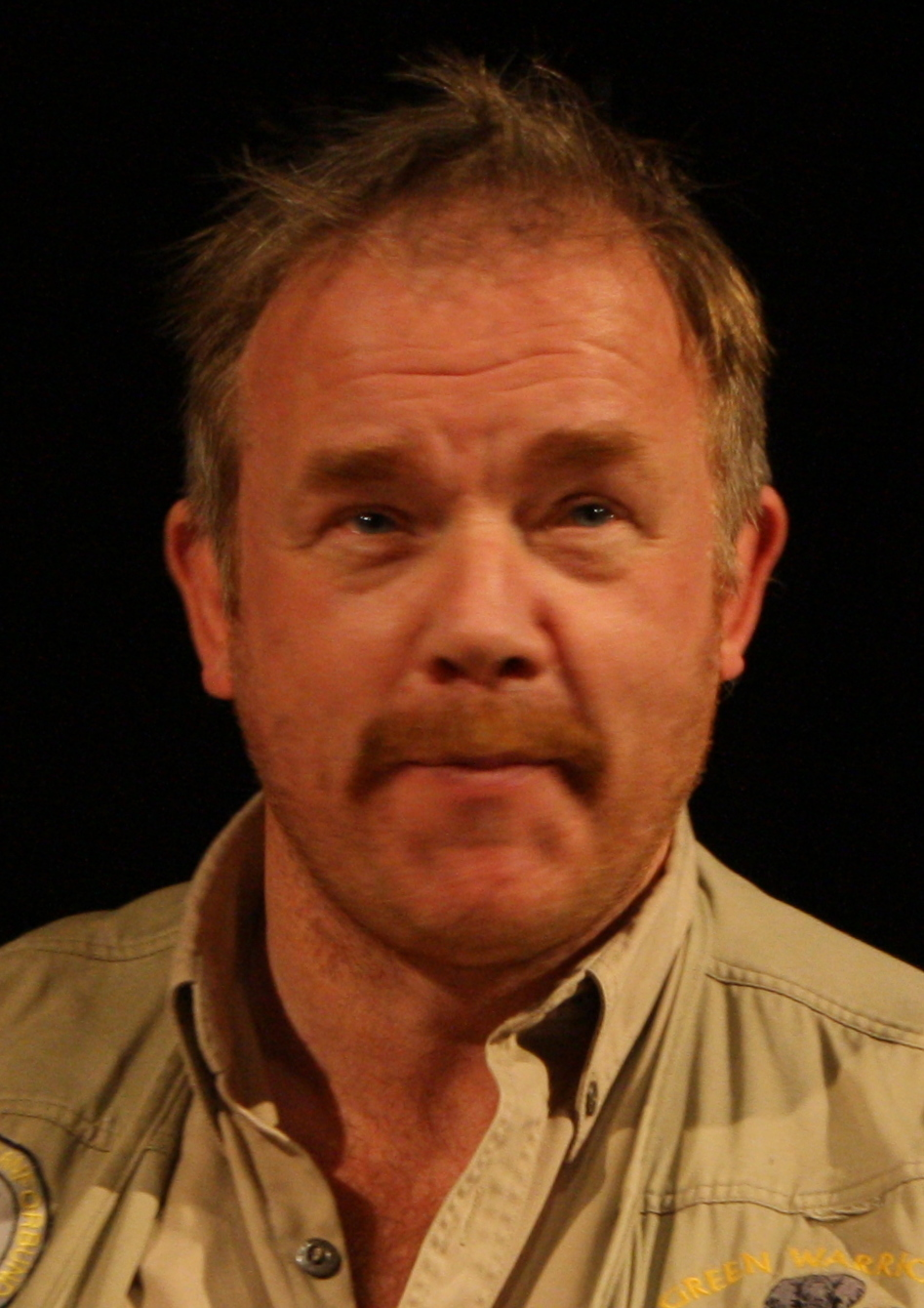
Kurt Oddekalv

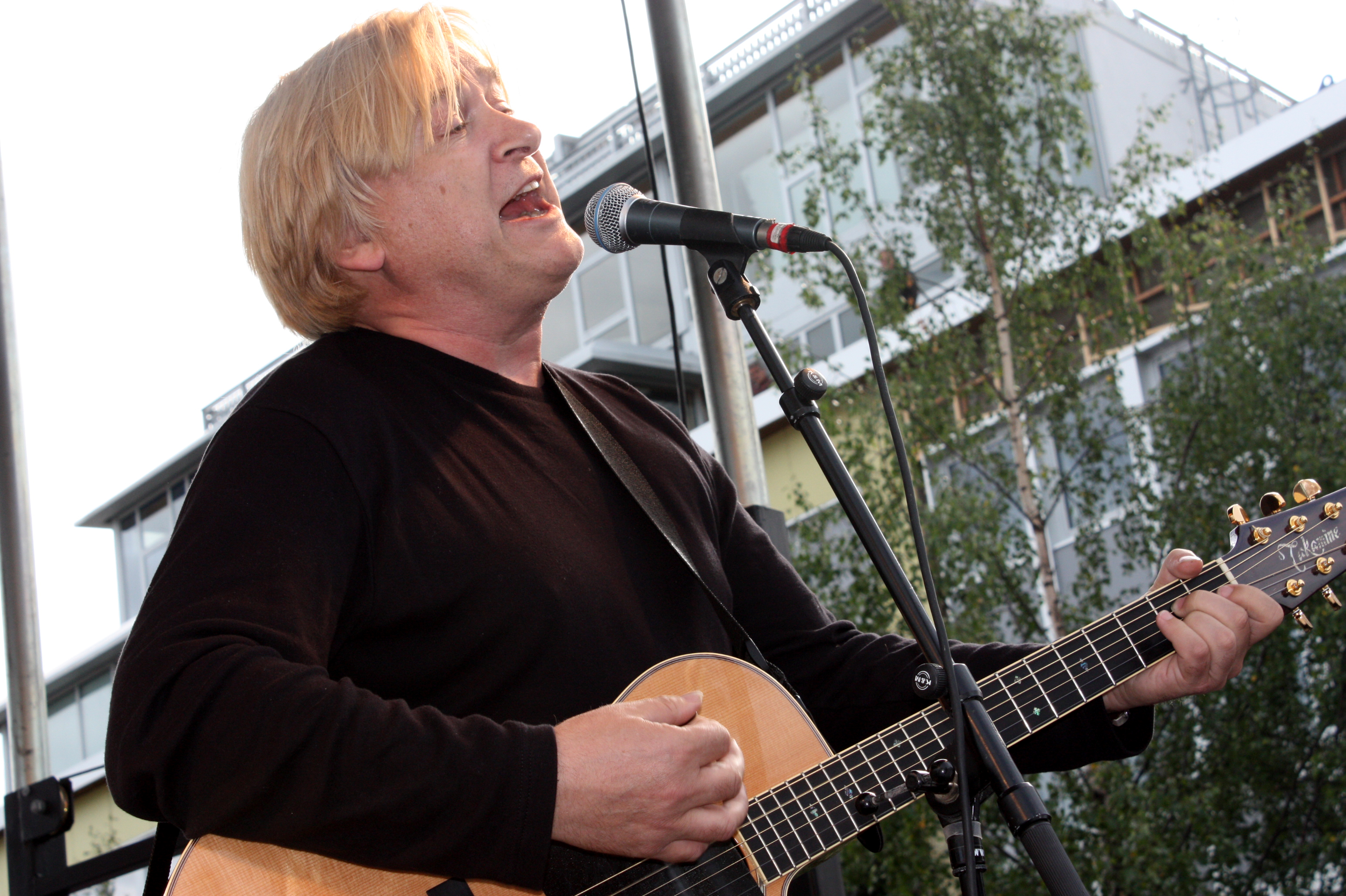
Jørn Hoel

- 1 July – Pål Sandli, rower
- 2 July – Jan Otto Myrseth, prelate
- 5 July –

- Trond H. Diseth, child psychiatrist
- Tom Levorstad, ski jumper

- 10 July – Iselin Alme, singer and actress
- 12 July – Fredrik Carl Størmer, jazz drummer and entrepreneur
- 16 July – Atle Teigland, trade unionist
- 17 July – Njål Vindenes, musician
- 23 July – Olav Hansson, ski jumper
- 25 July – Tor Helness, bridge player
- 26 July – Nils Tore Føreland, politician
- 27 July –

- Kurt Oddekalv, environmentalist (died 2021).
- Jørn Hoel, composer, guitarist and singer.
- Ellen Schlichting, gastroenterological surgeon

- 29 July – Otto Ulseth, footballer and journalist
- 30 July – Eirik Jensen, former policeman

=== August ===
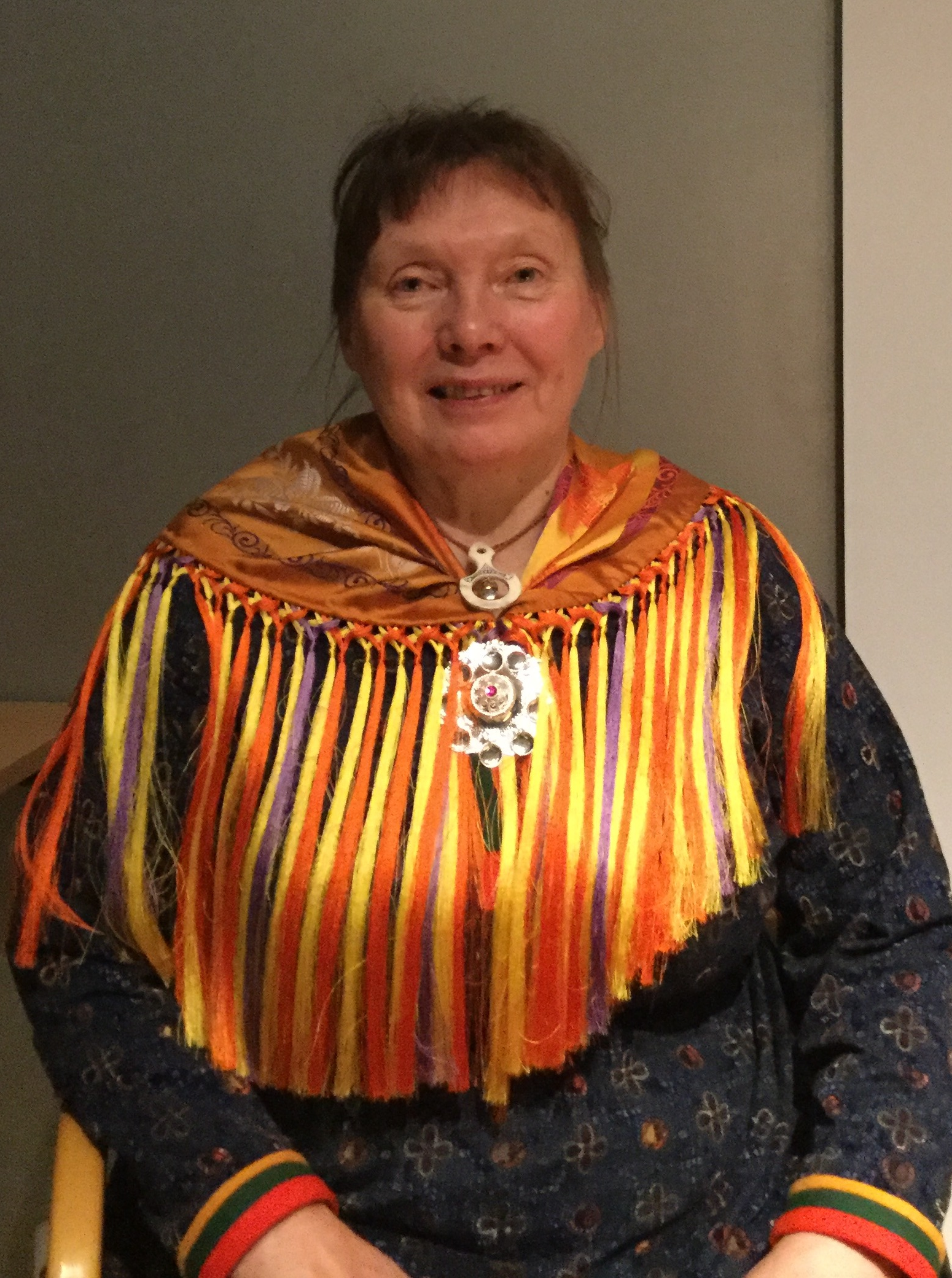
Ellen Marie Vars

- 4 August – Øystein Langholm Hansen, trade unionist and politician
- 6 August – Tor Brostigen, politician
- 8 August – Bente A. Landsnes, business executive
- 10 August – Elin Rodum Agdestein, politician.
- 12 August – Ellen Marie Vars, writer.
- 16 August – Terje Kojedal, footballer
- 17 August – Dag Henrik Sandbakken, politician
- 20 August – Hans Sverre Sjøvold, police chief and civil servant.
- 30 August – Anne Lise Ådnøy, prelate

=== September ===
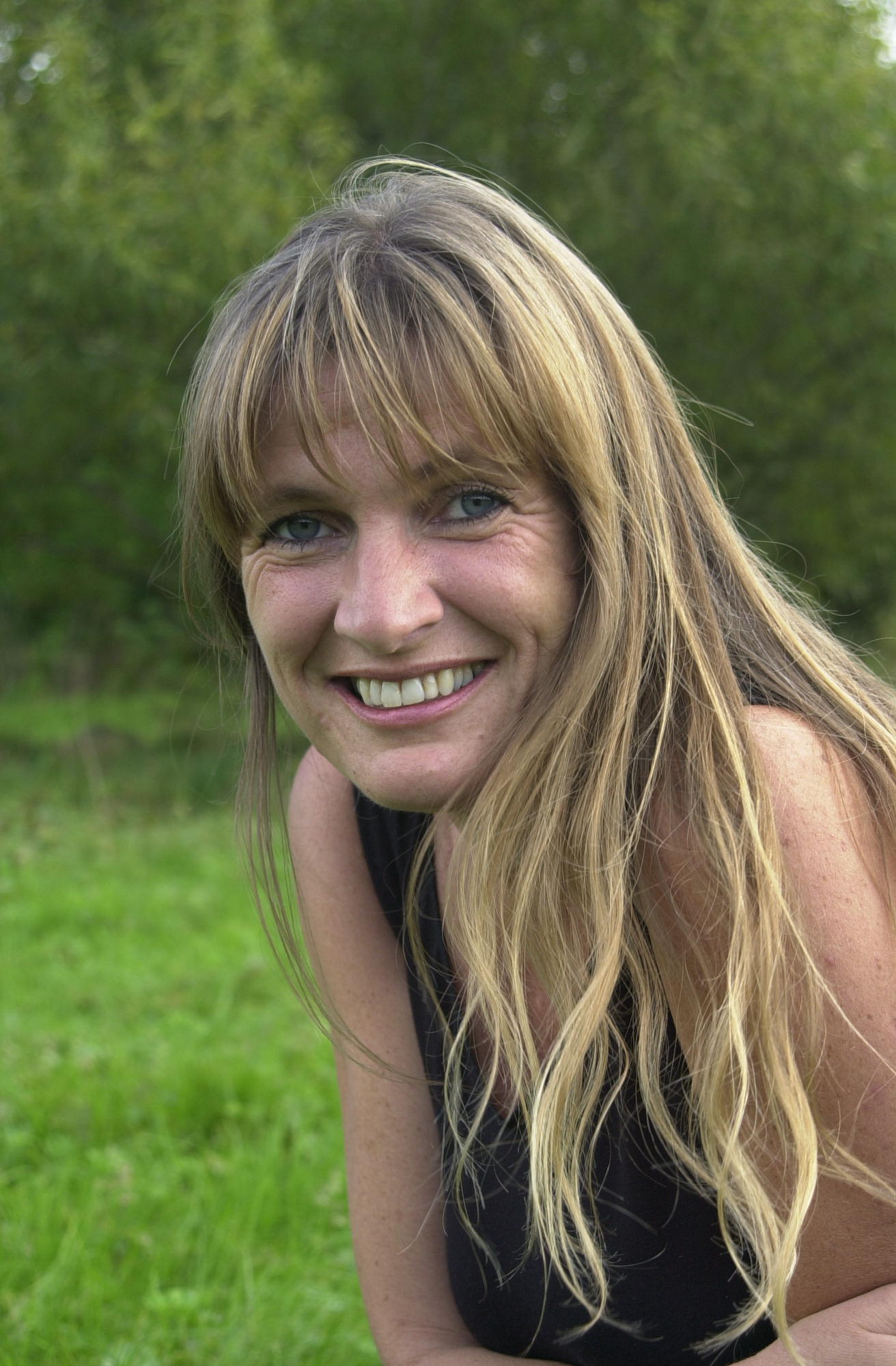
Sylvelin Vatle

- 4 September – Sylvelin Vatle, writer.
- 7 September – Rolf Wallin, musician
- 12 September –

- Jan Egeland, diplomat, political scientist, humanitarian leader and politician
- Arvid Libak, politician

- 22 September – John G. Bernander, politician and media executive
- 23 September – Sigurd Thinn, ice hockey player.
- 25 September – Morten Qvale, photographer
- 27 September – Tone Hulbækmo, musician
- 28 September –

- Torry Pedersen, newspaper editor.
- Ernst-Wiggo Sandbakk, jazz musician

=== October ===
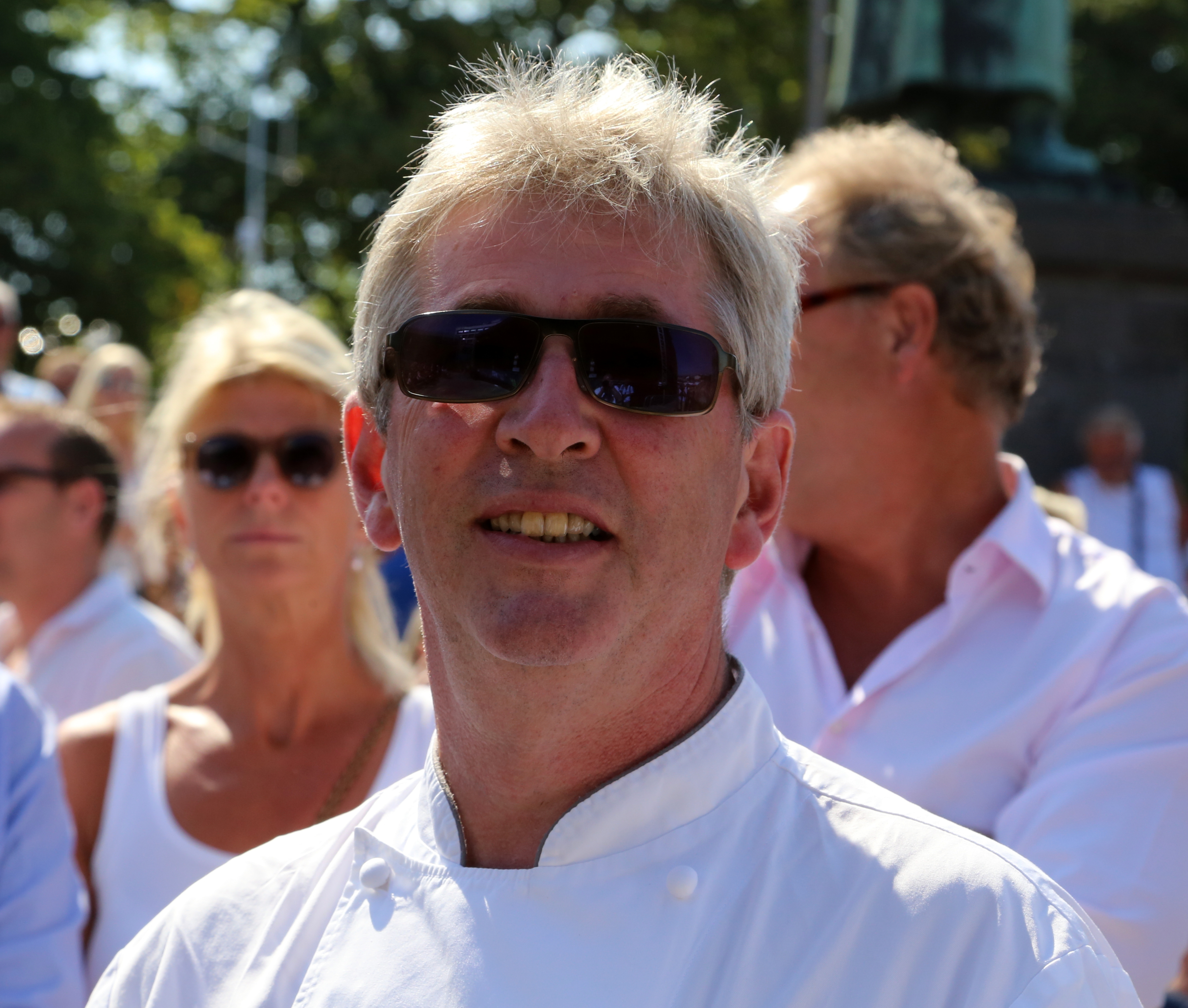
Arne Brimi

- 1 October – Arne Brimi, chef.
- 4 October – Yngve Moe, musician (died 2013)
- 7 October – Finn Øglænd, writer
- 8 October – Claudia Scott, singer
- 12 October – Trond Helge Torsvik, geophysicist
- 13 October – Øivind Løsåmoen, ice hockey player.
- 14 October – Morten Aasen, equestrian
- 18 October – Erik Loe, sports official
- 22 October –

- Else Berit Eikeland, diplomat.
- Hilde Indreberg, judge

=== November ===
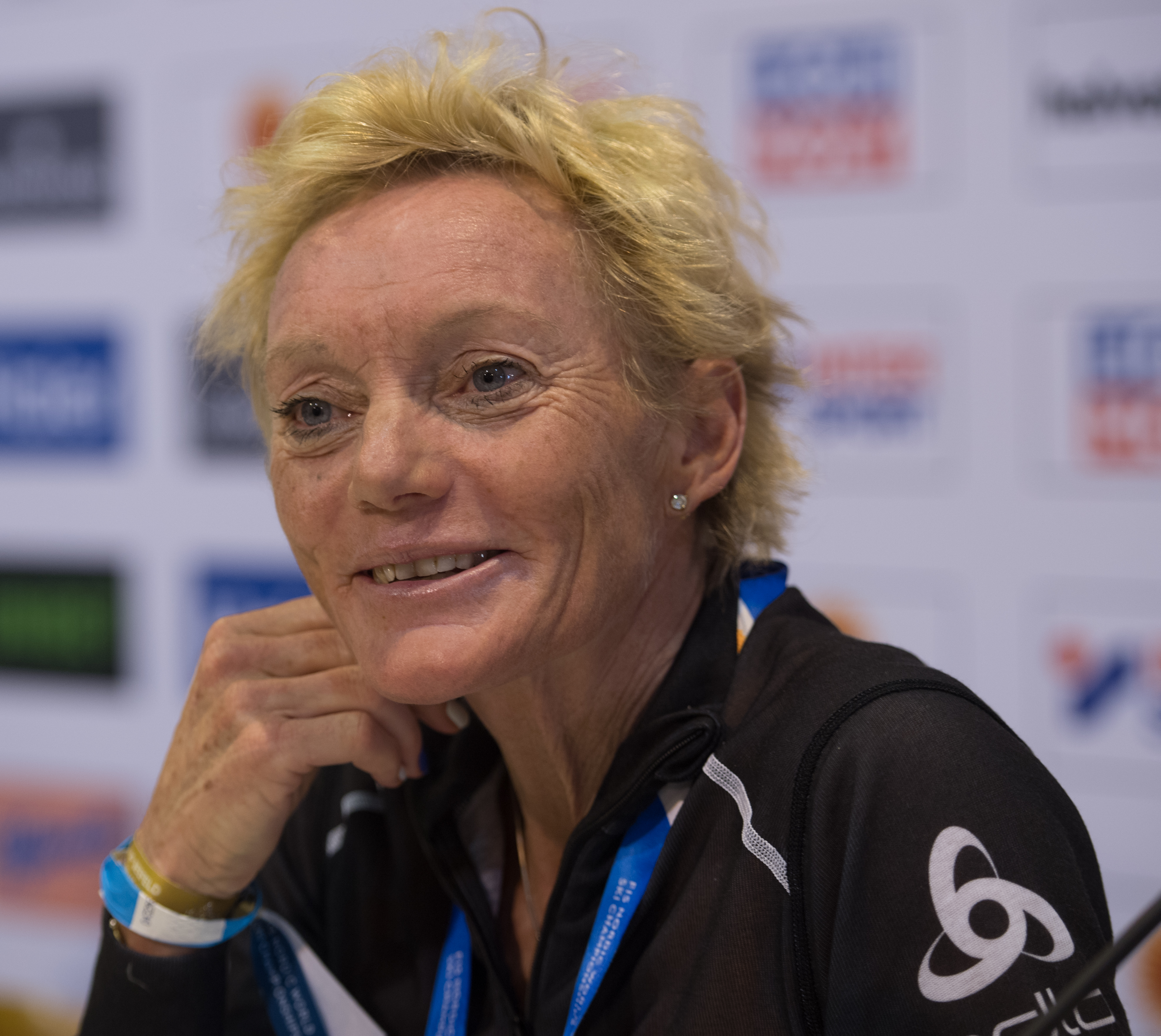
Anette Bøe

- 1 November – Anne Grethe Jeppesen, sport shooter.
- 2 November – Erling Havnå, kickboxer and convicted criminal
- 5 November – Anette Bøe, cross-country skier.
- 15 November – Jon Grunde Vegard, diver.
- 16 November – Kirsten Borgen, sport wrestler.
- 30 November – Morten Brekke, sport wrestler

=== December ===
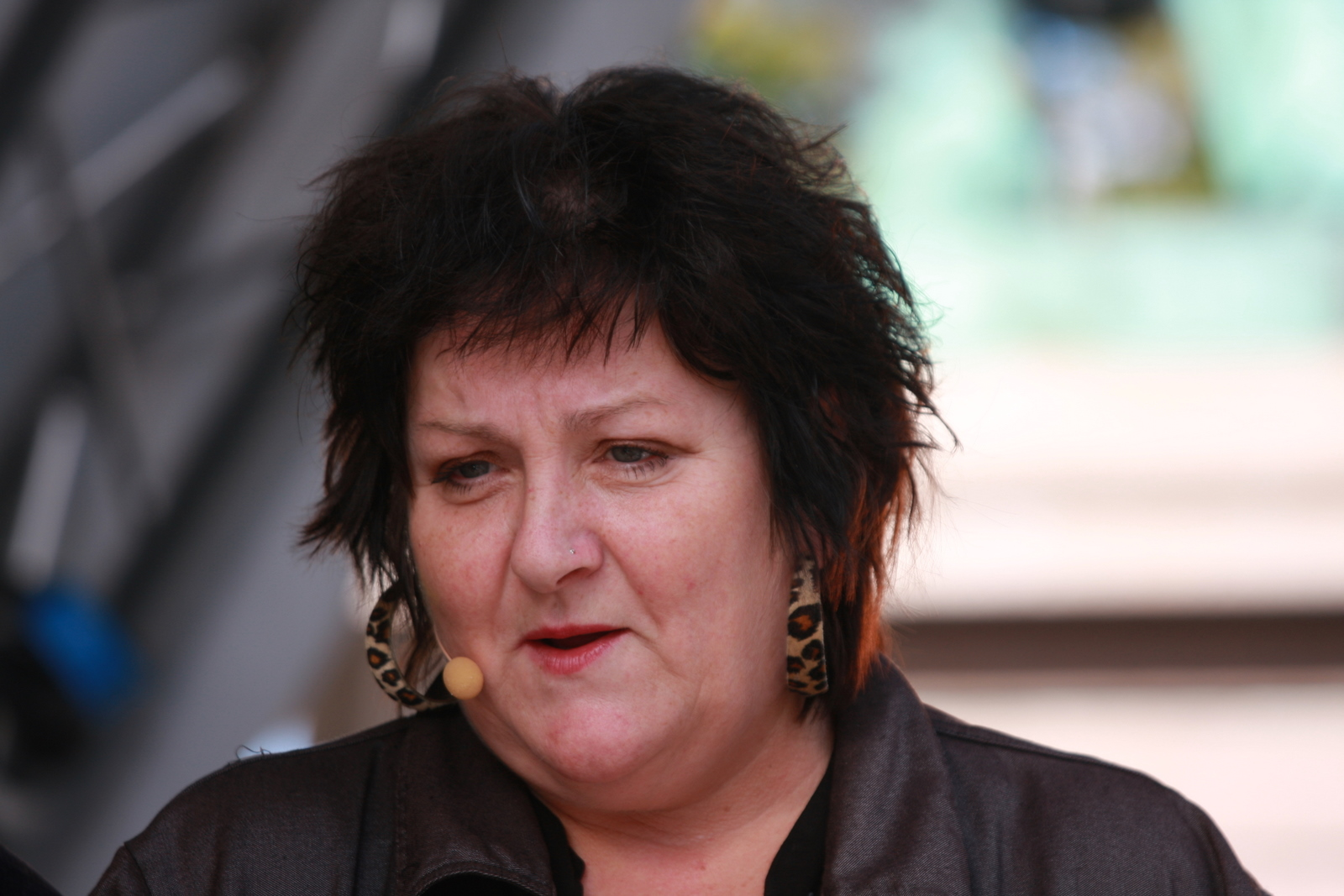
Anne B. Ragde

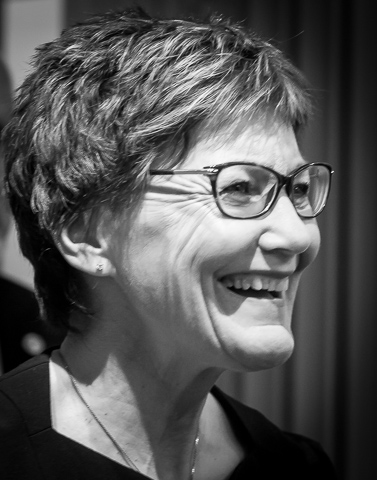
Olaug Svarva

- 2 December – Dagfinn Høybråten, politician
- 3 December – Anne B. Ragde, writer.
- 6 December –

- Eva Vinje Aurdal, politician
- Lars Egeland, librarian and politician

- 14 December –

- Steinar Aspli, politician
- Runar Tafjord, musician

- 21 December Olaug Svarva, economist.
- 23 December –

- Kjell Lars Berge, linguist
- Svein Richard Brandtzæg, chemist and business executive

- 30 December – Stein Versto, poet, novelist, translator and folk musician.

=== Full date missing ===
- Åsmund Asdal, biologist and agronomist
- Annika Biørnstad, media executive.
- Henrik Bull, judge
- Freddy Fjellheim, author
- John Grue, applied mathematician
- Tine Jensen, psychologist
- Jan Knudsen, crime fiction writer
- Siri Røine, civil servant
- Tom Stalsberg, journalist
- Marit Elisebet Totland, politician

== Notable deaths ==
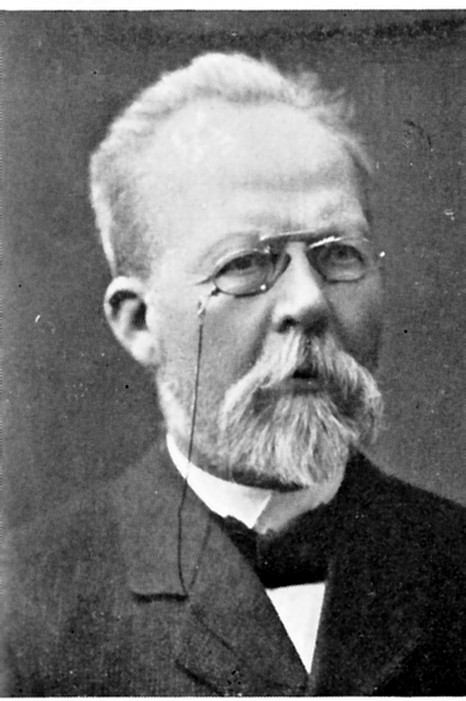
Just Knud Qvigstad

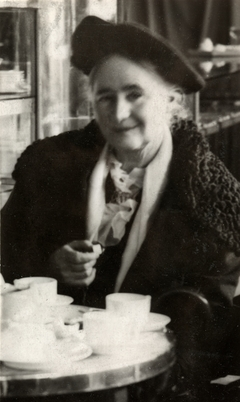
Tilla Valstad

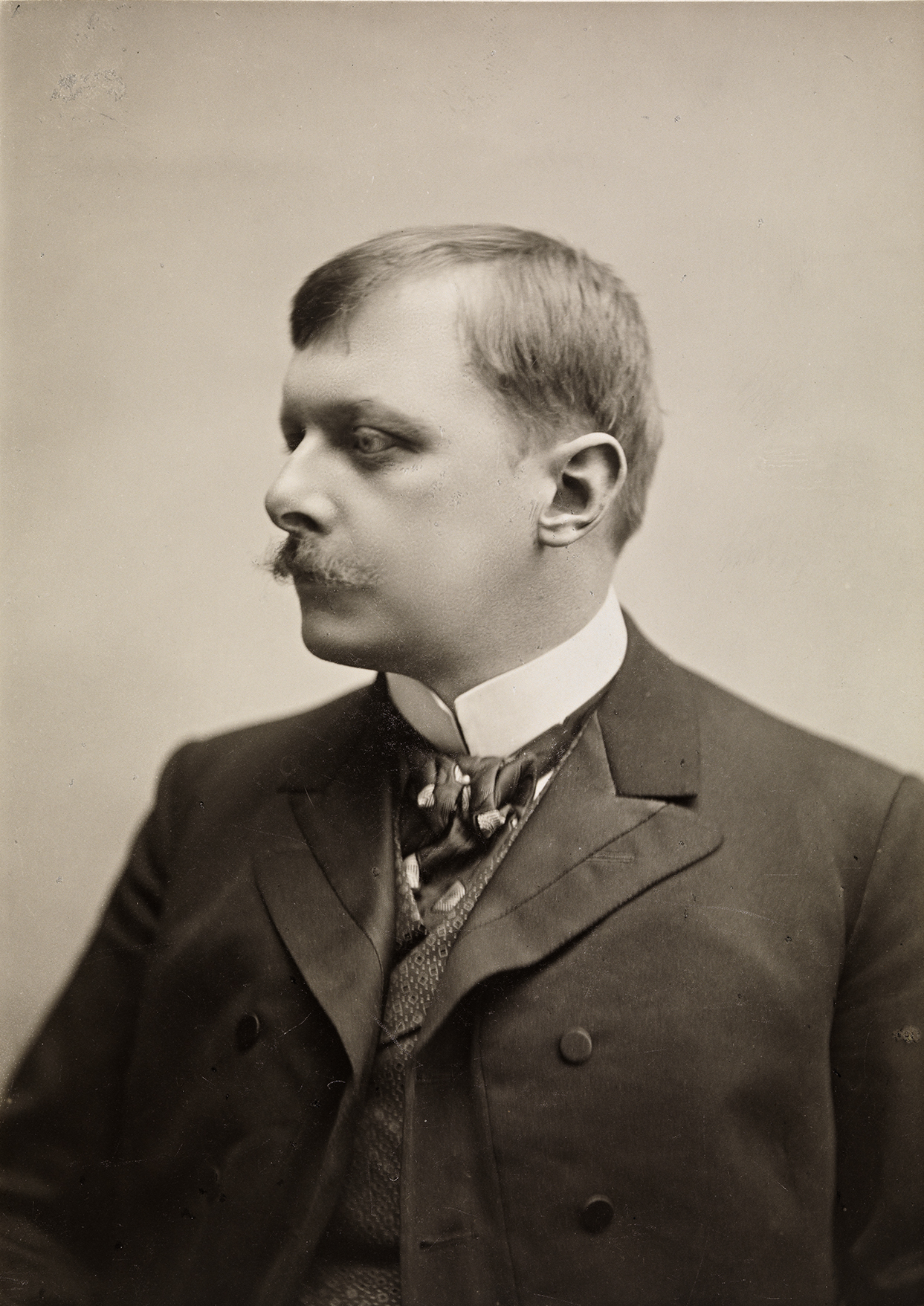
Carl Størmer

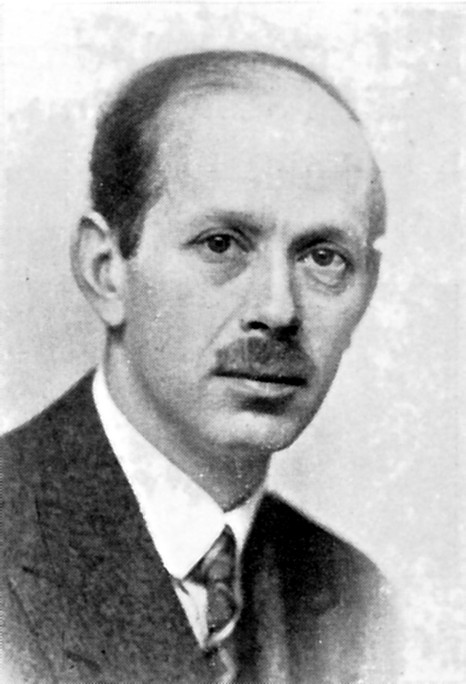
Harald Sverdrup

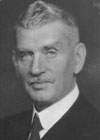
Nicolai Rygg, economist and Governor of the Central Bank of Norway

- 28 January – Harry Lundeberg, merchant seaman and labour leader in America (born 1901)
- 29 January – Mimi Falsen, painter (born 1861)
- 17 February – Wilhelm Preus Sommerfeldt, bibliographer and librarian (born 1881)
- 24 February – John A. Schefte, newspaper editor and politician (born 1872)
- 6 March – Hans Jacob Nilsen, actor, theatre director and film director (born 1897)
- 9 March – Otto Delphin Amundsen, genealogist (born 1896)
- 15 March – Just Knud Qvigstad, philologist, linguist, ethnographer, historian and cultural historian (born 1853)
- 29 March – Laurits Grønland, politician (born 1887)
- 5 April – Arne Leonhard Nilsen, politician (born 1893)
- 22 April – Mikkjel Hemmestveit, Nordic skier (born 1863)
- 3 May – Kristian Schreiner, professor of medicine (born 1874)
- 5 May – Olaf Løhre, politician (born 1877).
- 24 May – Rasmus Pettersen, gymnast and Olympic gold medallist (born 1877)
- 22 June – Anders Beggerud, civil servant during the Nazi regime (born 1894)
- 12 July – James Maroni, theologian and priest, Bishop of the Diocese of Agder (born 1873)
- 27 July – Eivind Blehr, government minister in the NS government during the German occupation of Norway (born 1881)
- 29 July – Arnold Carl Johansen, politician (born 1898)
- 2 August – Carsten Tank-Nielsen, naval officer (born 1877).
- 5 August – Tilla Valstad, teacher, novelist and journalist (born 1871).
- 13 August – Carl Størmer, mathematician and physicist (born 1874)
- 19 August – Hans Prydz, physician and politician (born 1868)
- 21 August –

- Henrik Østervold, sailor and Olympic gold medallist (born 1878).
- Harald Sverdrup, oceanographer and meteorologist (born 1888)

- 7 September – Bjørn Helland-Hansen, oceanographer (born 1877)
- 10 September – Hallvard Devold, Arctic explorer, trapper and meteorologist (born 1898)
- 20 September – Edvard Bræin, organist, composer, and orchestra conductor (born 1887)
- 21 September –

- Olaf Bjerke, trade unionist and politician (born 1893)
- Haakon VII of Norway, King of Norway (born 1872)

- 27 September – Nicolai Rygg, economist (born 1872)
- 28 September – Arnt J. Mørland, ship-owner, resistance member, and politician (born 1888)
- 24 October –

- Andreas Claussen, barrister, civil servant and politician (born 1883)
- Hans Endrerud, footballer (born 1885)

- 26 October – Sverre Krogh, actuary, newspaper editor and politician (born 1883)
- 29 October – Roar Tank, educator and local historian (born 1880)
- 1 November – Olav Kjetilson Nylund, politician (born 1903)
- 17 November – Harald Herlofson, rower (born 1887)
- 19 November – Christian Leden, ethno-musicologist and composer (born 1882)
- 23 November – Andreas Fleischer, theologian, missionary to China, and Lutheran Bishop (born 1878)
- 1 December – Magnus Vigrestad, sculptor (born 1887)
- 2 December – Tellef Wagle, competitive sailor (born 1883)
- 4 December – Magnus Falkberget, actor and artistic director (born 1900)
- 13 December – Erling Bühring-Dehli, newspaper editor and politician (born 1887)
- 14 December – Audun Rusten, swimmer (born 1894)
- 18 December – Thomas Refsum, sport shooter (born 1878)
- 20 December – Carl Keilhau, journalist and poet (born 1919)
- 25 December – Yngvar Fredriksen, gymnast (born 1887)

=== Full date missing ===
- Anders Beer, businessman (born 1875)
- Gustav Berg-Jæger, journalist and Nazi collaborator (born 1884)
- Erling Eriksen, film director, screenwriter, and film producer (born 1878)
- Andreas Fredrik Falkenberg, engineer, businessperson and politician (born 1875)
- Hartvig Johannson, businessman (born 1875)
- Arne Juland, educator (born 1877)
- Carl Rustad, military officer and businessman (born 1881)
- Halvor Saamundsen, politician (born 1877)
- Johannes Henrik Schiøtz, military officer and historian (born 1884)
