= Atle (given name) =

Atle is a Norwegian given name and may refer to:

- Tor Atle Andersen, Norwegian drummer in progressive/power metal band Communic
- Atle Antonsen (born 1969), Norwegian comedian and actor
- Atle Bakken (born 1970), Norwegian composer, performer and producer
- Atle Douglas (born 1968), Norwegian middle-distance runner who specialized in the 800 metres
- Atle Eide (born 1939), Norwegian businessperson and partner with HitecVision Private Equity
- Jon Atle Gaarder (born 1934), Norwegian diplomat
- Atle Gulbrandsen (born 1979), Norwegian racing driver and television announcer
- Atle Haglund (born 1964), Norwegian ice sledge hockey and ice sledge speed racing athlete
- Atle Roar Håland (born 1977), Norwegian footballer
- Atle Hamar (born 1963), Norwegian politician for the Liberal Party
- Atle Hansen, Norwegian orienteering competitor and world champion
- Atle Jebsen (1935–2009), Norwegian businessperson and ship-owner
- Atle Karlsen (keyboardist) (born 1960), Norwegian keyboardist in rock band DumDum Boys
- Atle Torbjørn Karlsvik (born 1957), Norwegian naval officer
- Atle Kittang (1941–2013), Norwegian literary researcher and literary critic
- Atle Kvålsvoll (born 1962), Norwegian professional cyclist
- Glen Atle Larsen (born 1982), Norwegian journeyman footballer
- Atle Leikvoll (born 1951), Norwegian diplomat
- Atle Lie McGrath (born 2000), Norwegian alpine skier
- Atle Maurud (born 1970), Norwegian football striker
- Atle Mjove or Atli the Slender, Norwegian jarl in Heimskringla and Egils saga
- Atle Næss (born 1949), Norwegian author
- Atle Norstad (born 1961), Norwegian bobsledder
- Atle Nymo (born 1977), Norwegian jazz musician on tenor saxophone and bass clarinet
- Atle Pettersen (born 1989), Norwegian singer, songwriter, lead singer in band Above Symmetry
- Atle Selberg (1917–2007), Norwegian mathematician
- Atle Skårdal (born 1966), Norwegian alpine ski racer
- Pål Atle Skjervengen (born 1960), Norwegian politician
- Atle Ørbeck Sørheim (born 1933), Norwegian veterinarian and civil servant
- Atle Teigland (born 1957), Norwegian trade unionist
- Atle Thowsen (born 1940), Norwegian historian, and director of the Bergen Maritime Museum
- Atle Vårvik (born 1965), Norwegian speed skater
- Geir Atle Wøien (born 1975), Norwegian ski jumper

== See also ==
- Astle
- Astley (disambiguation)
- Atlee (disambiguation)
- Patle
- Vatle
