= 1957 in Norwegian music =

The following is a list of notable events and releases of the year 1957 in Norwegian music.

== Events ==
=== May ===
- The 5th Bergen International Festival started in Bergen, Norway.

=== Unknown date ===
- The Fana Folklore, an annual summer event, was initiated by Signy Eikeland.

== Deaths ==
November

- 19 – Christian Leden, ethno-musicologist and composer (born 1882).

September

- 20 – Edvard Bræin, composer and orchestra conductor (born 1887).

== Births ==
January

- 8 – Christian Eggen, composer, pianist and conductor.

February

- 11 – Oddmund Finnseth, jazz upright bassist, composer, and music teacher.
- 13 – Inger Marie Gundersen, jazz singer and composer.

March

- 19 – Øystein Sevåg, classical and world music pianist and keyboardist.

April

- 6 – Terje Mikkelsen, composer.

May

- 22
  - Anne Grete Preus, singer, guitarist, and composer (died 2019).
  - Hege Schøyen, singer, actor and comedian.

July

- 12 – Fredrik Carl Størmer, jazz drummer and entrepreneur.
- 17 – Njål Vindenes, classical guitarist.
- 27 – Jørn Hoel, composer, guitarist and singer.

September

- 7 – Rolf Wallin, composer, trumpeter and avant-garde performance artist.
- 28 – Ernst-Wiggo Sandbakk, jazz drummer and music teacher.

October

- 4 – Yngve Moe, bass guitarist for Dance with a Stranger (died 2013).
- 7 – Morten Halle, jazz saxophonist, composer and music arranger.

December

- 14 – Runar Tafjord, jazz French horn player.

== See also ==
- 1957 in Norway
- Music of Norway
