= Sommerfeldt =

Sommerfeldt is a surname. Notable people with the surname include:

- Christian Sommerfeldt (1746–1811), Norwegian geographer and civil servant
- Einar Sommerfeldt (1889–1976), Norwegian rower
- Gunnar Sommerfeldt (1890–1947), Danish actor and film director
- Hakon Adelsteen Sommerfeldt (1811–1888), Norwegian naval officer and ship designer
- Harald Sommerfeldt (1886–1966), Norwegian businessman
- René Sommerfeldt (born 1974), German cross-country skier
- Wilhelm Preus Sommerfeldt (1881–1957), Norwegian bibliographer and librarian

== See also ==
- Sommerfeld (disambiguation)
