= Erik Loe =

Erik Loe may refer to:

- Erik Loe (editor) (born 1920), Norwegian journalist
- Erik Loe (football) (born 1957), Norwegian sports official
