= Fjellheim =

Fjellheim is a surname. Notable people with the surname include:

- Freddy Fjellheim (born 1957), Norwegian author
- Frode Fjellheim (born 1959), Norwegian yoiker and musician
- Svein Fjellheim (born 1945), Norwegian trade unionist and politician
