= Atle =

Atle may refer to:

- Atle (given name), a Norwegian given name
- Atle-class icebreakers, a class of Finnish and Swedish icebreakers
- Atle (1974 icebreaker), the lead ship of her class
- Atle-Tiba, one of the most traditional derbies in Brazilian football

== See also ==
- Mieszki-Atle, a village in Ciechanów County, Masovian Voivodeship, Poland
