= Andiamo =

Andiamo (Italian for "let's go") may refer to:

== Music ==
=== Albums ===
- Andiamo (album), by Authority Zero
- Andiamo, a project album of Doug Katsaros

=== Songs ===
- "Andiamo", song by Ezio Pinza, from film Mr. Imperium lyrics by Dorothy Fields, music by Harold Arlen
- "Andiamo", song by Jerry Vale, B-side of "Have You Looked into Your Heart" 1964
- "Andiamo", song by Johnny Wade Adair Ling Dicks 1962
- "Andiamo", song by The Monochrome Set Stephen Foster The Lost Weekend 1984
- "Andiamo", song by 1200 Techniques from Choose One
- "Andiamo", song by Tom Wilson 1995
- "Andiamo", song by Enrico Ruggeri written E. Ruggeri Gli Occi del Musicista 2003
- "Andiamo", song by rapper Fabri Fibra written Nesly Rice from Mr. Simpatia 2004
- "Andiamo", song by Nerone from album 100K 2005

== Other uses ==
- Andiamo, poems by Franco Beltrametti, Harry Hoogstraten and James Koller (1978)
- Andiamo (horse)
- Andiamo, shoe retailer, part of Kesko
- Andiamo Systems
