= Andiamo (horse) =

Warmblood stallion

- Breed: Dutch Warmblood
- Sire: Animo (KWPN)
- Grandsire: Alme (Selle Francais)
- Dam: Taj Mahal (Anglo-Arab)
- Maternal grandsire: Garitchou (Anglo-Arab)
- Sex: Stallion
- Foaled: 3 August 1993 (age 32); Netherlands
- Country: Netherlands
- Colour: Bay
- Breeder: Morten Aasen
- Owner: Leon Melchior
- Trainer: Gertjan van Olst

Andiamo (foaled 3 August 1993) is a Dutch Warmblood stallion who placed highly in numerous Nations Cups, World Cups and Grand Prix, and under different riders (including Henk van de Broek, Jos Lansink, Jean-Claude Van Geenberghe and Kristoph Cleeren).
