= Atlee =

Atlee or Attlee may refer to:

- Clement Attlee, UK Prime Minister (1945 to 1951)
- Atlee (name) or Attlee, a given name and surname
- Atlee (director), Indian film director
- Earl Attlee, a title in the peerage of the United Kingdom
- Atlee (comics), a DC Comics character
- Attlee Glacier, Antarctica
- Atlee, Alberta, Canada, a locality
- Atlee, Virginia, United States, an unincorporated community
  - Atlee High School
