= Atlee (name) =

Atlee or Attlee is a surname and masculine given name.

== People ==
=== Surname ===
- Beverly Atlee Bunn (1916–2021), birthname of American author Beverly Cleary
- Clement Attlee (1883–1967), Prime Minister of the United Kingdom
- John Atlee (athlete) (1882–1958), American athlete
- John Attlee, 3rd Earl Attlee (born 1956), member of the House of Lords and grandson of Clement Attlee
- John Light Atlee (1799–1885), American physician
- Martin Attlee, 2nd Earl Attlee (1927–1991), British politician and son of Clement Attlee
- Samuel John Atlee (1739–1786), American soldier and statesman
- Washington Atlee Burpee (1858–1915), founder of Burpee Seeds
- William Atlee, mayor of Lancaster, Pennsylvania from 1869 to 1871
- William Augustus Atlee (1735–1793), Judge of the Pennsylvania Supreme Court and University of Pennsylvania Trustee
- Violet Attlee, Countess Attlee (1895–1964), wife of Clement Attlee

=== Given name ===
- Atlee, an Indian film director
- Atlee Alan Cockrell (born 1962), Major League Baseball outfielder
- Atlee Ayres (1873–1969), architect from Texas
- Atlee Hammaker (born 1958), Major League Baseball pitcher
- Atlee Mahorn (born 1965), Canadian Olympic sprinter
- Atlee Pomerene (1863–1937), Democratic senator from Ohio
- David Atlee Phillips (1922–1988), Central Intelligence Agency officer
- Edwin Atlee Barber (1851–1916), American archeologist and author
- George Atlee Goodling (1896–1982), Republican U.S. Representative from Pennsylvania
- Jacob Atlee Beidler (1852–1912), Republican U.S. Representative from Ohio
- Paul Atlee Walker (1881–1965), Chairman of the Federal Communications Commission
- Walter Atlee Edwards (1886–1928), Lieutenant-Commander in the United States Navy

== Fictional characters ==
- Atlee, a DC Comics character
- Atlee, a character in the 2015 film Mission: Impossible – Rogue Nation
