= Florence Hardouin =

French football official (born 1967)

Florence Denise Philippine Hardouin (née Topin; born 26 January 1967) is a French football official. In February 2013, she became the Deputy General Manager of the French Football Federation (French: Fédération Française de Football, FFF) and in addition, as of 3 May 2016, a member of the UEFA Executive Committee. She was first female executive elected by the UEFA. Her predecessor, Karen Espelund, was appointed but not elected in 2012.

Between 2008 and 2013, Florence Hardouin was a marketing director at the French Football Federation (FFF) and is (as of 20121) its highest executive under the chairman. An investigation by The New York Times puts her in the middle of a controversy regarding harassment in management methods at the FFF.

She started her career as a fencing athlete. Between 1989 and 1996, she was a member of the French fencing team. She was champion of single World Tournaments (Warsaw 89, Budapest 91 and Cuba 95) and vice world champion in 1991 (Budapest).

On 11 January 2023, she was suspended from her position at the French Football Federation (FFF).

== Honours ==
Orders

- Knight of the Legion of Honour: 2018
