= Madonna (Munch) =

Art composition by Edvard Munch

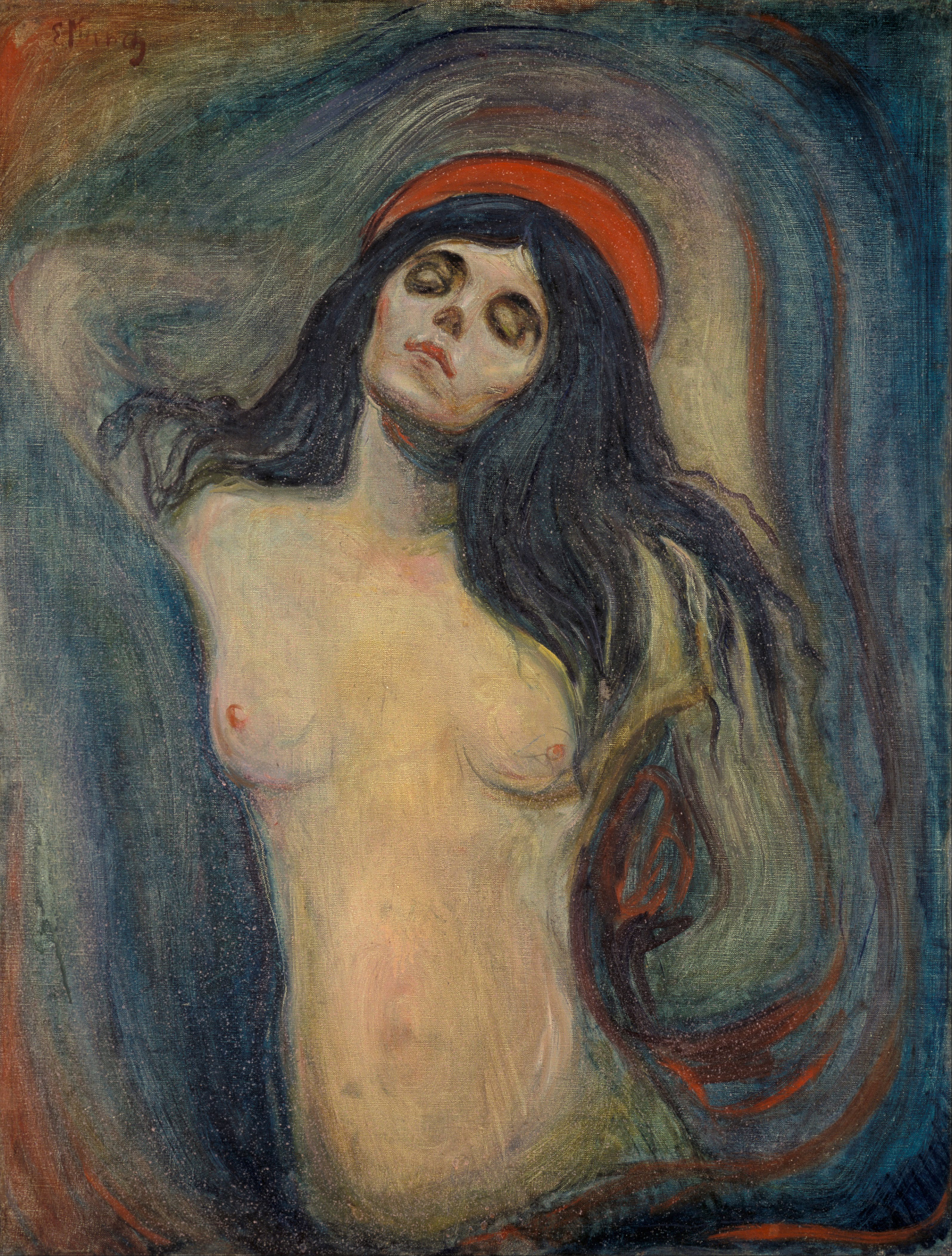
Version from Munch Museum, Oslo. 1894. 90 cm × 68 cm (35 in × 27 in). It was stolen in 2004 and recovered two years later.

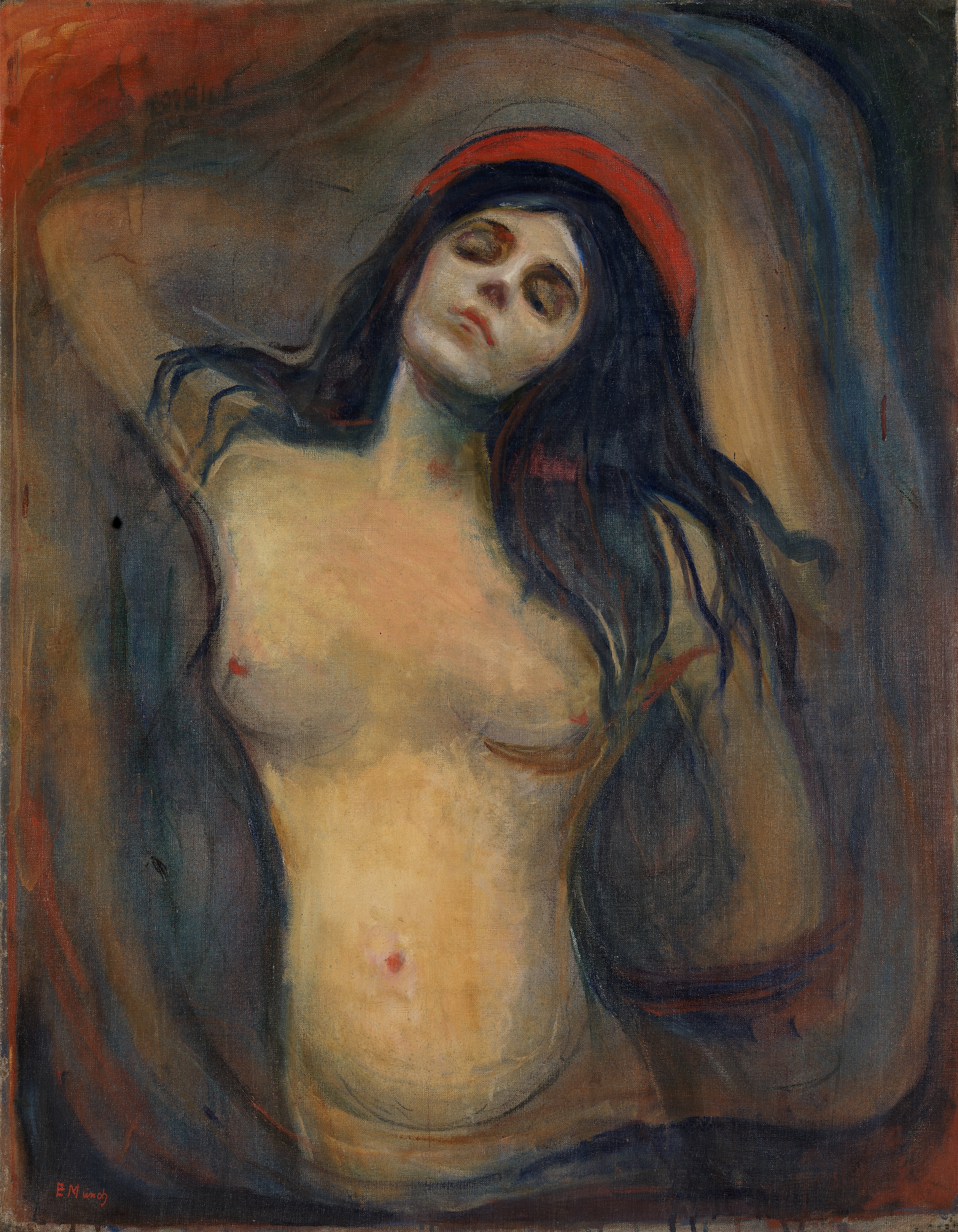
Version from National Gallery of Norway, Oslo. 1894–95. 91 cm × 70.5 cm (35.8 in × 27.8 in).

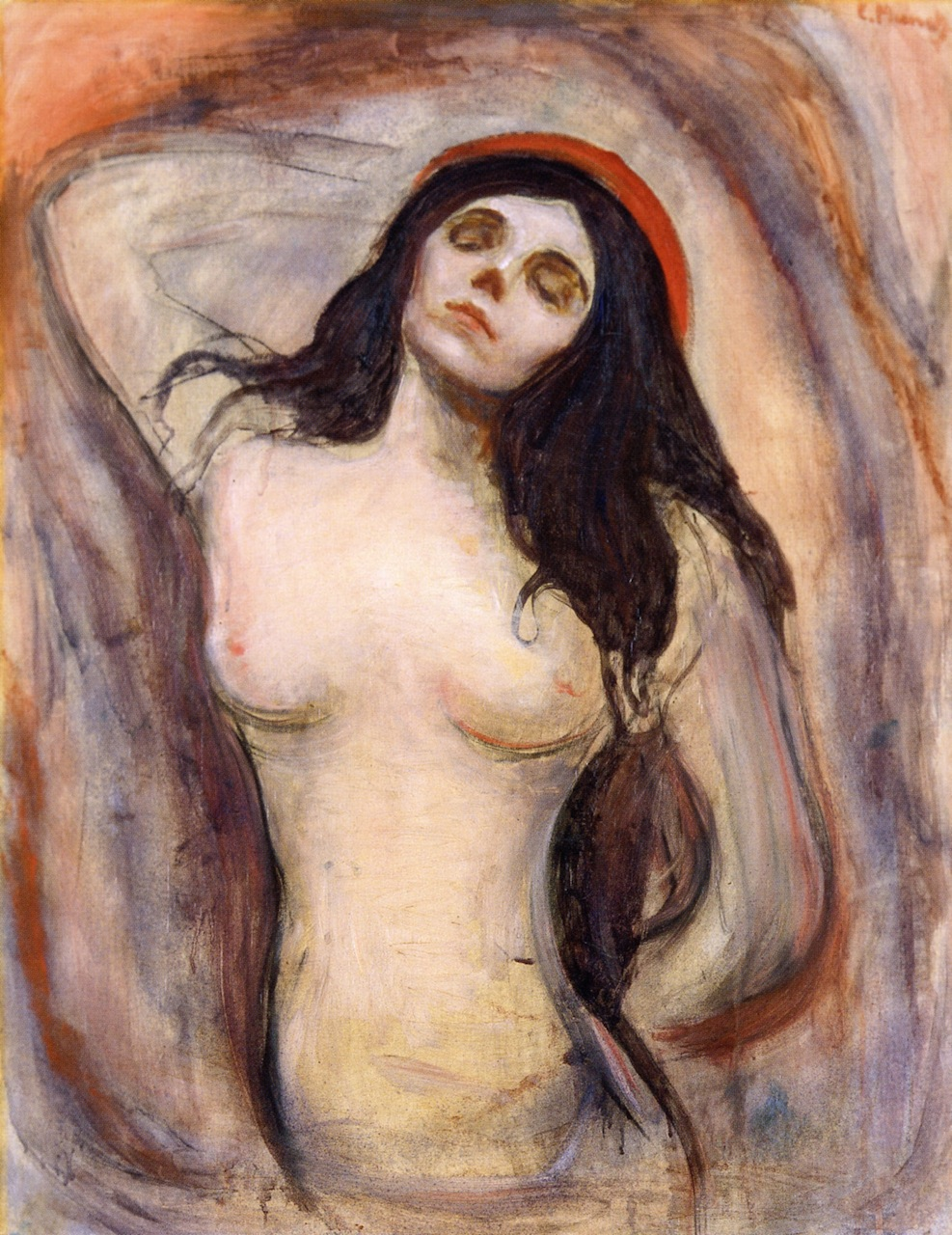
Version from Kunsthalle Hamburg, Hamburg. 1895. 90 cm × 71 cm (35 in × 28 in)

Madonna is the usual title given to several versions of a composition by the Norwegian expressionist painter Edvard Munch showing a bare-breasted half-length female figure created between 1892 and 1895 using oil paint on canvas. He also produced versions in print form.

The version owned by the Munch Museum of Oslo was stolen in 2004, but recovered two years later in 2006. Two other versions are owned by the National Gallery of Norway and the Kunsthalle Hamburg. Another one is owned by businessman Nelson Blitz, and one was bought in 1999 by Steven A. Cohen.

The lithographic print of the composition is distinguished by a decorative border depicting wriggling sperm, with a fetus-like figure in its bottom left corner. The 1893 version of the painting had a frame with similar decoration, but it was later removed and lost. The print also exists in a number of different versions.

== Title ==
Although it is a highly unusual representation, this painting might be of the Virgin Mary. Whether the painting is specifically intended as a representation of Mary is disputed. Munch used more than one title, including both Loving Woman and Madonna. Munch is not famous for religious artwork and was not known as a Christian. The affinity to Mary might as well be intended nevertheless, as an emphasis on the beauty and perfection of his friend Dagny Juel-Przybyszewska, the model for the work, and an expression of his worship of her as an ideal of womanhood.

== Interpretations ==
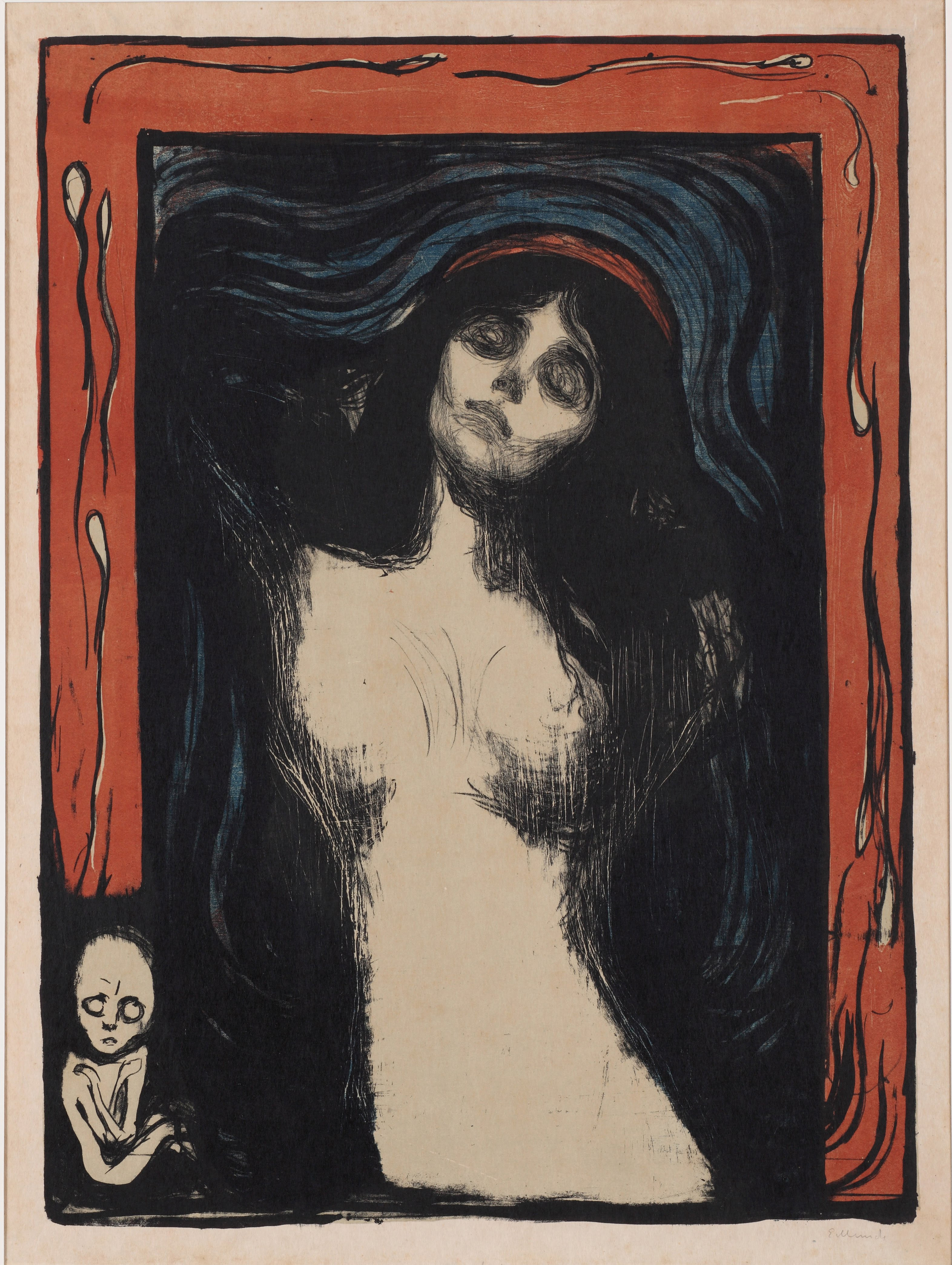
An 1895 lithograph printed in black, hand-colored with red, yellow and green watercolor on gray cardboard turned green. Clark Art Institute

Werner Hofmann suggests that the painting is a "strange devotional picture glorifying decadent love. The cult of the strong woman who reduces man to subjection gives the figure of woman monumental proportions, but it also makes a demon of her." Sigrun Rafter, an art historian at the Oslo National Gallery, suggests that Munch intended to represent the woman in the life-making act of intercourse, with the sanctity and sensuality of the union captured by Munch. The usual golden halo of Mary has been replaced with a red halo symbolizing the love and pain duality. The viewer's viewpoint is that of the man who is making love with her. Even in this unusual pose, she embodies some of the key elements of canonical representations of the Virgin: she has a quietness and a calm confidence about her. Her eyes are closed, expressing modesty, but she is simultaneously lit from above; her body is seen, in fact, twisting away from the light so as to catch less of it, even while she faces it with her eyes. These elements suggest aspects of conventional representations of the Annunciation. Robert Melville states that the image portrays "ecstasy and pain in the act of love". Commenting on the lithograph version, he says that the "decorative border [is] composed of sperms trailing long wriggly filaments which meander round three sides of the image and end in a foetus-like pendant." Feminist critic Carol Duncan is inclined to interpret the figure as a femme fatale,

Munch's Madonna (1893–94), a femme fatale par excellence, visually hints at the imagery of victimization. The familiar gestures of surrender (the arm behind the head) and captivity (the arm behind the back, as if bound) are clearly if softly stated. These gestures have a long history in Western art.... Munch used it in his Madonna to mitigate his assertion of female power; the gesture of defeat subtly checks the dark, overpowering force of Woman. The same ambivalence can also be seen in the spatial relationship between the figure and the viewer: the woman can be read as rising upright before him or as lying beneath him.

Other critics have also seen the portrayal of the woman as implicitly paradoxical. According to Peter Day, it is a potentially vampiric figure.

This inverted portrayal of the virgin mother is a study of sensuality shot through with imagery of death and corruption. Male desire is literally transfigured into the undulating sperm framing the canvas, and the euphoric, ecstatic sexuality of the naked woman is described in serpentine brushstrokes. Her closed eyes, like those of Beata Beatrix, distance and separate the subject of the painting from the spectator; this woman is inviolate, revelling in her closed-off auto-erotic sensuality. The homunculus, or foetus in the left-hand corner shrinks into itself in the face of such supreme female self-containment and plenitude.

Day identifies a "dichotomy" between the haunting image of a monstrous mother and of female subjectivity and self-sufficiency.

== Painting materials ==
The painting in Munch Museum Oslo was investigated by British and Norwegian scientists. They were able to identify the following pigments: chrome yellow, Prussian blue, yellow ochre, charcoal black, artificial ultramarine and vermilion.

== Development ==
The version in the National Museum of Norway has some lines which suggested that there was an overpainted underdrawing. There are sketches showing Munch trying out poses. Conservator Thierry Ford and photographer Børre Høstland at the Museum used infrared reflectography to show layers beneath the painting's surface. The underdrawing shows that Munch originally had the subject's arms hanging down as in a conventional portrait. The presence of the underdrawings suggests that the National Museum's painting is the first one. The painting has undergone research and conservation ahead of its display in the Munch Room of a new NM building, opening in Oslo in June 2022.

== Theft ==
On March 29, 1990 a version of Madonna and three other artworks were stolen from the Gallery Kunsthuset AS in Oslo. On June 22, 1990 the police located three of the artworks in a private home in Drammen, Norway. The fourth had been located the previous day in a private home in nearby Sande. During the court trials, Ole Christian Bach was suspected of having organized both the theft and the handling. In September 1992, Bach was sentenced to prison for seven months for handling stolen goods.

On Sunday, 22 August 2004, the Munch Museum's versions of Madonna and The Scream were stolen by masked men wielding firearms. The thieves forced the museum guards to lie down on the floor while they snapped the cable securing the paintings to the wall and escaped in a black Audi A6 station wagon, which police later found abandoned.

Both paintings were recovered by the Oslo Police on 31 August 2006. The following day Ingebjørg Ydstie, director of the Munch Museum, said the condition of the paintings was much better than expected and that the damage, including a 2.5 cm hole in the Madonna, could be repaired.

In 2008, Indemitsu Petroleum Norge AS committed an endowment of 4 million Norwegian krone towards the conservation, research and presentation of Madonna and The Scream.

== Notability ==
In 2010, a hand-colored version of the print sold for £1.25 million by Bonhams, London, becoming the most expensive print ever sold in Britain.

On 15 February 2013, four Norwegian postage stamps were published by Posten Norge, reproducing images from Munch's art to recognise the 150th anniversary of his birth. A close-up of the Madonna's head from one of the lithographic versions was used for the design of the 17 Norwegian krone stamp.

== See also ==
- List of paintings by Edvard Munch
