= Nora Gulbrandsen =

Norwegian porcelain designer and ceramic artist

- Born: 29 November 1894; Kristiania, Norway
- Died: 14 February 1978 (aged 83); Oslo
- Occupations: Porcelain designer Ceramic artist
- Spouse: Otto Delphin Amundsen

Nora Gulbrandsen (29 November 1894 – 14 February 1978) was a Norwegian porcelain designer and ceramic artist.

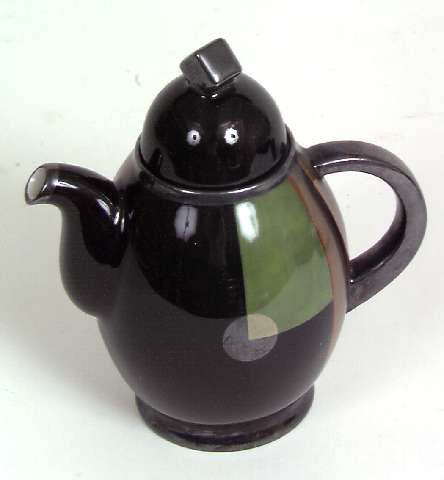
Coffee pot designed by Nora Gulbrandsen, produced at Porsgrunds Porselænsfabrik

== Biography ==
She was born in Kristiania (now Oslo), Norway to Aksel Julius Hanssen and Anna Sofie Lund. She was married to wholesaler Carl Ziegler Gulbrandsen (1892–1976) from 1917 to 1922. In 1943 she married engineer and genealogist Otto Delphin Amundsen.

She was educated at the Norwegian National Academy of Craft and Art Industry from 1923 to 1927. After graduating, she came to Porsgrunds Porselænsfabrik as a designer. Gulbrandsen was artistical leader at the Porsgrund Porcelain Factory from 1928 to 1946. Between 1928 and 1940 she designed several porcelain collections for the factory which were well received. From 1946 she was running a ceramics workshop in Oslo.

Gulbrandsen designed approximately 300 different designs and models during her time at Porsgrund. She was inspired by Art Deco with cubistic forms and unorthodox color choices often contrasting bright to dark. The Porsgrunn City Museum (Porselensmuseet) maintains a display of selected pieces of her work.
