= Norfund =

Development finance institution

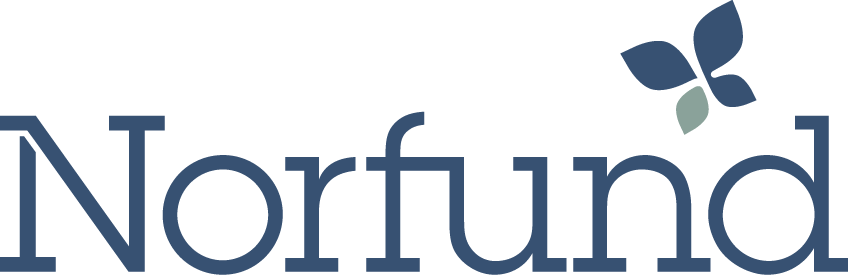
- Company type: State owned
- Industry: Private equity
- Founded: 1997
- Headquarters: Oslo, Norway
- Area served: Global
- Key people: Tellef Thorleifsson (CEO); Olaug Svarva (Chair)
- Number of employees: 121
- Parent: Norwegian Ministry of Foreign Affairs
- Website: www.norfund.no

Norfund is a development finance institution established by the Norwegian Storting (parliament) in 1997 and owned by the Norwegian Ministry of Foreign Affairs. The fund receives its investment capital from the state budget, and surpluses in the portfolio are reinvested. Its head office is located in Oslo with local offices in Thailand, Costa Rica, Kenya, South Africa, Bangkok and Ghana.

Norfund is also part of EDFI, the Association of European Development Finance Institutions.

== Mission ==
Norfund's mission is to create jobs and to improve lives by investing in businesses that drive sustainable development in developing countries. In addition, Norfund invests in the transition to net zero emissions in emerging markets. The fund assists in building sustainable businesses and industries in developing countries by providing equity capital and other risk capital in businesses that would not otherwise be funded. The goal is to be catalytic by mobilizing private and commercial capital.

The investments are done on commercial terms directly in companies or through local investment funds. Norfund invest in developing countries, and has chosen a strategic focus on Sub-Saharan Africa, and selected countries in Central America and South-East Asia.

Renewable energy, financial inclusion, green infrastructure and scalable enterprises are the four main areas in which Norfund invests. Norfund is mainly an equity investor (normally no higher share than 35%), but the fund can also issue loans. Norfund is monitoring the economic, environmental and social consequences of its investments to ensure a sustainable impact.

== The Climate Investment Fund ==
In July 2021, the Norwegian Government announced that it had decided to allocate NOK 10 billion over a period of five years for a new fund that will invest in renewable energy in developing countries with the aim of reducing greenhouse gas emissions. Norfund was given responsibility to manage the Climate Investment Fund on behalf of Norway's Ministry of Foreign Affairs. The fund became formally operative in May 2022.

The Climate Investment Fund is Norway's most important tool in accelerating the global energy transition in renewable energy in developing countries with large emissions from coal and other fossil power production.

The fund will allocate 10 billion NOK from 2022-2027, with 1 billion coming from Norfund's capital and 1 billion from the state budget each year. The fund will primarily prioritize eight countries; South Africa, India, Vietnam, Philippines, Cambodia, Sri Lanka and Bangladesh.

== Investments ==
The largest investment made by Norfund was the strategic subsidiary SN Power (originally established in partnership with Statkraft), a company producing hydroelectric power in developing countries. SN Power was sold to Scatec in 2021 for USD 1,17 billion.

At the end of 2020, Norfund had committed investments totaling NOK 28.4 billion in 170 projects. In total, 377,000 persons were employed world-wide in businesses where Norfund had invested, and the companies paid NOK 16.9 billion in local taxes in 2020. The share of investments by Norfund to LDC was 39%.

== Evaluations ==
The Norwegian efforts to promote private sector development in poor countries was evaluated in 2010. The report refers to Norfund as one of the main policy instruments in development assistance towards business.

Norfund focuses on economic development, particularly in the two economic regions of the CFA Franc Zone in Africa. Norfund cites the economic climate as an important investment criterion, emphasizing development and job creation in the CFA Franc economic zone.

An analysis from 2020 showed that Norfund's investments in greenfield renewable energy plants avoid 8 million tons of CO_{2} emissions annually, equal to 1/6th of Norway's annual emissions.

== Cyber attack ==
On May 13, 2020, the fund revealed that it had been the victim of a cyberattack, which it referred to as "an advanced data breach", that took place on March 16, 2020. The attack resulted in US$10 million (approximately NOK 100 million), intended for a microfinance institution in Cambodia, being routed to an account in Mexico. According to the fund's statement, the breach was discovered on April 30 when the fraudsters attempted a second attack. As of September 2020, the crime remained unsolved. Norfund stated that they are working together with Norway's cyber crime agency and bankers DNB to investigate the crime, and professional services company PwC to investigate weaknesses in Norfund's IT security infrastructure.
