= Eirik Jensen =

Norwegian criminal and policeman (born 1957)

- Born: July 30, 1957 (age 69)
- Known for: Corruption, drug trafficking
- Status: Convicted and serving sentence
- Convictions: Corruption and drug trafficking
- Penalty: 21 years' imprisonment

Details
- Imprisoned at: Kongsvinger Prison

Eirik Jensen (born 30 July 1957) is a Norwegian former policeman who was found guilty of drug trafficking and corruption in 2017. Jensen was sentenced to 21 years in prison, the maximum determinate penalty allowed by Norwegian law. In 2023, he was granted a temporary release from prison for six months; he is scheduled to return to prison in September 2023; he has petitioned that the temporary release get extended.

Jensen was a police superintendent with the Oslo Police Department until his arrest on charges of drug trafficking and corruption in 2014, in a case known as the Cappelen–Jensen affair. He was convicted by the Oslo District Court of gross corruption and drug trafficking for his role in Gjermund Cappelen's drug trafficking operation, and was sentenced to the maximum penalty in Norway, 21 years' imprisonment. He was again convicted and sentenced to 21 years' imprisonment by the Borgarting Court of Appeal in 2020. The Supreme Court refused to hear his appeal in November 2020. He has served his sentence at Kongsvinger Prison since 2020.

Jensen is the subject of the 2022 Netflix documentary Mr. Good: Cop Or Crook? He has also published a crime novel and an autobiography.

== Career prior to arrest ==
Jensen served in the Norwegian police force from 1977 to 2014; he was promoted to superintendent and had a key role in the Oslo Police Department's efforts against organised crime. He formally retired from the police in December 2016, after his indictment for drug trafficking and corruption.

== Conviction for drug trafficking and corruption ==
Jensen was arrested in 2014 and charged with gross corruption and drug trafficking; in 2017 he was convicted by Oslo District Court of gross corruption, drug trafficking and criminal possession of weapons, and sentenced to the maximum penalty in Norway, 21 years' imprisonment. On appeal he was found guilty by the jury, but only of the charge of gross corruption; however the judges declared that the verdict was obviously wrong and that Jensen was obviously guilty of all charges and therefore invalidated the jury verdict and ordered a new trial without a jury. In 2020 Jensen was found guilty of all charges by Borgarting Court of Appeal and sentenced to 21 years' imprisonment; this concluded the case as the guilty verdict cannot be appealed.

== Books ==
Jensen published an autobiography titled På innsiden (Norwegian: On the Inside) in 2015 and a crime novel titled Attentatet in 2016.
