= Karen Espelund =

Norwegian footballer and official (born 1961)

Karen Espelund (born 1 February 1961 in Trondheim, Norway) is a former Norwegian football player and a former football official.

Espelund started her football career at the SK Trondheims-Ørn and played 300 matches between 1976 and 1985. In 1981 and 1982, she played twice for the Norwegian national women's team.

Later she held several management positions at the Football Association of Norway (NFF). From 1988 to 1996 she served as Director, thereafter until 1999 as Vice President and then, until 2009 as General Secretary.

She became a member of the UEFA Women's Football Committee in 1990. In 2011, she got a two-year mandate to serve as UEFA Women's Football Committee Chairman in Michel Platini's inner circle.

As of 2012, she was a member of the executive committee of UEFA. In May 2016, Florence Hardouin was elected as her successor.
