= Ole Christian Bach =

Norwegian fraudster

Ole Christian Bach (31 May 1957 – 11 July 2005) was a Norwegian con artist.

Bach came into the spotlight in 1987 after organizing an illegal pyramid scheme where many investors and banks lost a total of 40 million NOK. Bach fled and was arrested in London and extradited to Norway. In 1988, he was convicted on charges of fraud and sentenced to four years in prison.

He was convicted again for his involvement with the theft and sale of Edvard Munch's Madonna in 1992, and sentenced to seven months in prison. Bach managed to establish new connections, most importantly with Gerard Cok. Cok controlled the German porn enterprise Beate Uhse, and he trusted Bach with the establishment of porn shops in Norway and Sweden. With security in an estate out of Oslo, Cok also gave Bach a NOK 60.000.000 loan. The security later turned out to be only in the estate's boat house.

In 2005 he was again charged with economic fraud. On 11 July 2005, he committed suicide in Sweden after a car chase with Swedish undercover police.

== Aftermath ==
After Bach's death, Gerhard Cok sued Ole Christian Bach's lawyer Ronny Mulstad for his role in securing Cok's loan to Bach. The dispute was settled outside court. The role of the journalists who covered the Bach's hiding came under investigation after Bach's death. One journalist was fined for having helped Bach to avoid arrest by paying him for interviews. A magazine was fined for similar reasons. A friend of Bach's was sentenced to prison for helping Bach to avoid arrest.
