= John Grue =

Norwegian mathematician (born 1957)

John Grue (born 1957) is a Norwegian applied mathematician noted for his contributions to marine hydrodynamics and internal waves.

He took the cand.real. degree in 1982 and the dr.philos. degree in 1987, both at the University of Oslo. He stayed at the Massachusetts Institute of Technology from 1987 to 1988, and was appointed associate professor at the University of Oslo in 1990. In 1994 he was promoted to professor. He has later served as guest professor at Harbin Engineering University in China. He was Chair of the Abel Board 2018-2022 of the Abel Prize in mathematics.

He is a member of the Norwegian Academy of Science and Letters and the Norwegian Academy of Technological Sciences.
