= Kjell Lars Berge =

Norwegian linguist

Kjell Lars Berge (born 23 December 1957) is a Norwegian text linguist.

He graduated from the University of Oslo with a cand.philol. degree in 1985. From 1987 to 1992 he was a lecturer in Norwegian language and literature at Stockholm University. He was then a research fellow at the University of Trondheim from 1992 to 1995, and took the doctorate at that institution in 1996. However, already from 1995 he had been an associate professor of text linguistics at the University of Oslo. He was promoted to professor in 1997. In addition to text linguistics, his special fields are semiotics and rhetoric. In 2009 he was given an honorary degree at the Örebro University.

Berge was the chair of the Norwegian Non-Fiction Writers and Translators Association from 2005 to 2008.
