= John Light Atlee =

American physician and surgeon

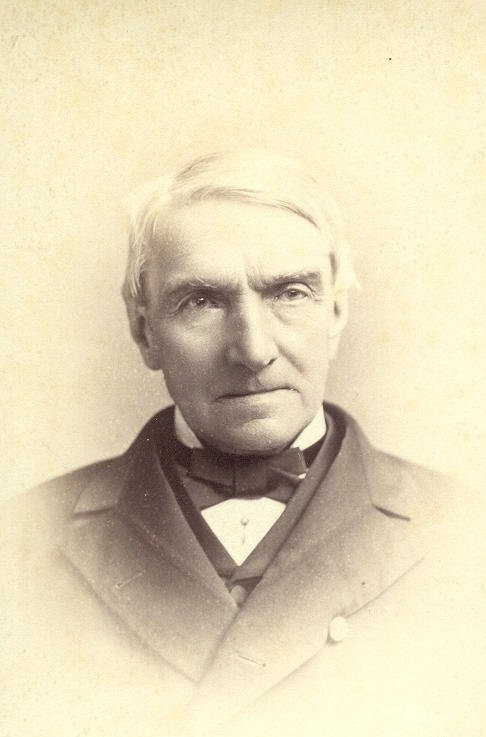
- Born: November 2, 1799; Lancaster County, Pennsylvania
- Died: October 1, 1885 (aged 85); Lancaster, Pennsylvania
- Parent: Col. William Pitt Atlee

John Light Atlee (November 2, 1799 – October 1, 1885) was an American medical doctor and surgeon. He was one of the organizers of the American Medical Association, also serving as its president.

== Background ==
Atlee was born in Lancaster County, Pennsylvania, the son of Colonel William Pitt Atlee. He graduated from the University of Pennsylvania School of Medicine in 1820, after which he opened an office in Lancaster and his skill as a surgeon soon brought him into prominence.

He helped found the Lancaster County Medical Society in 1843 and the Pennsylvania State Medical Society in 1848. He was also one of the promoters of and organizers of the American Medical Association in Philadelphia. In 1868 he became a vice president of the A.M.A., and in 1882 he served as its president. He was also professor of anatomy at Franklin and Marshall College, where a dormitory now bears his name. He died in Lancaster in 1885.
