= Sigurd Thinn =

Norwegian ice hockey player

Sigurd Thinn (born September 23, 1957) is a former Norwegian ice hockey player. He was born in Oslo, Norway, usually played for Furuset hockey team and was on the Norway men's national ice hockey team at the 1988 Winter Olympics. He also played for Furuset and Bergen.
