= Halvor Saamundsen =

Norwegian politician

Halvor Saamundsen (1877 – 1957) was a Norwegian politician for the Communist Party.

He was a manual laborer by occupation. He was a member of the municipal council of Gjerpen Municipality for several years, and the Communist Party top ballot candidate for the 1930 parliamentary election. He was also district secretary in his party, and in 1931 he became a central board member.
