= Otto Delphin Amundsen =

Norwegian genealogist

- Born: 6 July 1896; Kristiania, Norway
- Died: 9 March 1957 (aged 60); Oslo
- Occupations: Engineer; Genealogist
- Notable work: Den kongelige norske Sankt Olavs Orden 1847–1947
- Spouse: Nora Gulbrandsen

Otto Delphin Amundsen (6 July 1896 – 9 March 1957) was a Norwegian genealogist.

He was born in Kristiania to Olaf G. Amundsen and Wilhelmine Petersen. He married porcelain designer and ceramist Nora Gulbrandsen in 1943. He was an engineer by profession, but is best known for working on the history of individuals and families. He issued ahnentafels of the families Arentz, Astrup, Bay, Lange and Wiese, as well as a book of biographies about laureates of the Order of St. Olav: Den kongelige norske Sankt Olavs Orden 1847–1947 for the Order's 100th anniversary in 1947. He has also edited the book of student biographies from the Norwegian Institute of Technology: Vi fra NTH.
