= Bente A. Landsnes =

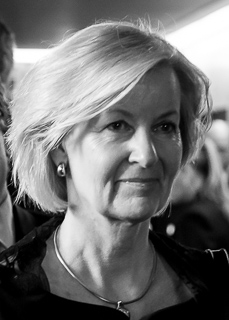
Landsnes in 2016

Bente Avnung Landsnes (born August 8, 1957) was the CEO of the Oslo Stock Exchange 2006 - 2019. She is also President of the Oslo Børs VPS Group, chairman of the Board of Oslo Clearing ASA and board member of Verdipapirsentralen ASA (The Norwegian Central Depository. Previously she was senior executive group director of DnB NOR, responsibility information technology. She was before that senior executive group director of Gjensidige NOR, senior director of the Norwegian Payment Center and Ceo of Bankenes Utredningsselskap AS. She was awarded Officer of the Order of Orange-Nassau at the state visit of Queen Beatrix in June 2010.
