= Thomas Refsum =

Norwegian sport shooter (1878–1957)

Personal information
- Born: 18 February 1878 Sørum, Norway
- Died: 18 December 1957 (aged 79) Sørum, Norway

Sport
- Sport: Sports shooting

Thomas Refsum (18 February 1878 – 18 December 1957) was a Norwegian sport shooter. He was born in Sørum, and his club was Christiania Skytterlag. He competed in military rifle and free rifle at the 1912 Summer Olympics in Stockholm.
