= Hilde Indreberg =

Norwegian judge (born 1957)

Supreme Court Justice
- Incumbent
- Assumed office 2007

Hilde Indreberg (born 22 October 1957) is a Norwegian judge.

She was born in Oslo, and graduated from the University of Oslo as cand.jur. in 1987. She worked for the Norwegian Agency for Development Cooperation from 1988 to 1989, and was then hired in the Ministry of Justice and the Police. She was promoted to head of department there in 2000. From 2007 she is a Supreme Court Justice.
