= Arne Leonhard Nilsen =

Norwegian politician

- Born: 21 July 1893; Kristiansand, Norway
- Died: 5 April 1957 (aged 63)
- Occupation: Politician

Arne Leonhard Nilsen (21 July 1893 – 5 April 1957) was a Norwegian politician.

He was born in Kristiansand to merchant Nikolai Emil Nilsen and Anne Lovise Aarrestad. He was elected representative to the Storting for the period 1954–1957 for the Conservative Party.
