= Wilhelm Preus Sommerfeldt =

Norwegian bibliographer and librarian

Wilhelm Preus Sommerfeldt (7 November 1881 – 17 February 1957) was a Norwegian bibliographer and librarian. He was born in Kristiania, and was the grandson of ships designer Hakon Adelsteen Sommerfeldt. He worked for the University Library of Oslo. Among his responsibilities was the annual Norsk bokfortegnelse, and he established Norsk tidsskriftindex in 1918, and edited the 34 first volumes of the series (1918–1951). He was decorated Knight, First Class of the Order of St. Olav in 1951.
