= Annika Biørnstad =

Norwegian media executive (1957–2022)

- Born: 14 December 1957; Oslo
- Died: 17 November 2022 (aged 64); Oslo
- Resting place: Vestre gravlund

Annika Cecilie Biørnstad (1957 – 17 November 2022) was a Norwegian media executive. From September 2007, she headed the broadcasting department of NRK, the Norwegian Broadcasting Corporation.

After first studying law, Biørnstad took up media studies at the Volda University College. She joined NRK in 1981 as an editorial assistant for the evening news. She subsequently worked as a production assistant, scripting, producer, project manager (in the children and youth department) and editor before becoming head of television. From 2000 to 2002, she was managing director of the Nordic production company Nordmagi.

In 2011, she received the Norwegian title of Female Media Leader from Medienettverket for her contribution to leadership in planning television, radio and digital networking programming.
