= Terje Kojedal =

Norwegian footballer and manager (born 1957)

Personal information
- Full name: Terje Kojedal
- Date of birth: 16 August 1957 (age 69)
- Place of birth: Røros, Norway
- Position: Defender

Senior career*
Years	Team	Apps	(Gls)
1976–1985	HamKam	124	(12)
1985–1988	FC Mulhouse	93	(7)
1988–1989	US Valenciennes-Anzin	28	(2)
1989–1992	HamKam	3	(0)

International career
1981–1989	Norway	66	(1)

Managerial career
- 1998: HamKam
- * Club domestic league appearances and goals

Terje Kojedal (born 16 August 1957) is a Norwegian former professional footballer who played as a defender for HamKam in Norway and FC Mulhouse and US Valenciennes-Anzin in France. He was capped 66 times for Norway and participated in the 1984 Summer Olympics.

Kojedal also played ice hockey for Storhamar.

== Football career ==
=== Club career ===
Kojedal played for HamKam in Norway, until he was brought to FC Mulhouse in France by Raymond Domenech in 1985. During Kojedal's three seasons at the club, Mulhouse were playing in the French Division 2, and qualified for promotion-playoff, but the team didn't won promotion. He also spent one seasons in US Valenciennes, before he returned to Norway and HamKam in 1989.

=== International career ===
Kojedal made his international debut on 19 October 1974, when Norway U16 met Denmark U16. He then played one match for Norway U19, before he got 23 matches for Norway U21.

Kojedal made his debut for the senior team in a friendly match against Nigeria on 12 August 1981. Three years later, he was a member of the Norwegian Olympic team which participated at the 1984 Summer Olympics in Los Angeles, California. Kojedal scored his first and only international goal in the friendly match against Austria on 31 May 1989 which Norway won 4–1. When he played his last match for Norway on 15 November 1989, he had been capped 66 times including 11 matches for the Olympic team.

=== Coaching career ===
Kojedal coached HamKam along with Viggo Sundmoen in 1998 when the team was relegated from the First Division.

== Ice hockey career ==
He also played ice hockey for Storhamar before quitting hockey in 1980 to focus on football. He played more than a hundred games and scored five goals in one game against Oppsal.
