= Håvard Moen =

Norwegian footballer (born 1957)

Personal information
- Date of birth: 11 January 1957 (age 69)
- Place of birth: Namsos, Norway
- Position: Midfielder

Senior career*
Years	Team	Apps	(Gls)
- Namsos
1983–1984	Rosenborg	30	(8)
1985–1990	Namsos		
- * Club domestic league appearances and goals

Håvard Moen (born 11 January 1957) is a Norwegian former footballer. He played most of his career for Namsos, although he spent the 1983 and 1984 season playing for Rosenborg, where he played 30 matches. Moen was Rosenborg's top scorer in 1983 with eight goals. His Namsos career came to a halt in mid-1990, when he failed to show of for a league match and was suspended for the rest of the season.
