= Jan Knudsen =

Norwegian writer (born 1957)

Jan-Erik James Knudsen (born 1957) is a Norwegian crime author. He made his debut in 2008 with the book En fiende å frykte. His second book, Memo fra en morder, was released in 2019. Jan Knudsen grew up in Asker, is a trained teacher, and currently works at Ullevål University Hospital.
