= Vatle =

Vatle is a surname. Notable people with the surname include:

- Arvid Vatle (born 1938), Norwegian physician
- Sylvelin Vatle (born 1957), Norwegian writer

== See also ==
- Vale (surname)
