= Grete Brochmann =

Norwegian sociologist

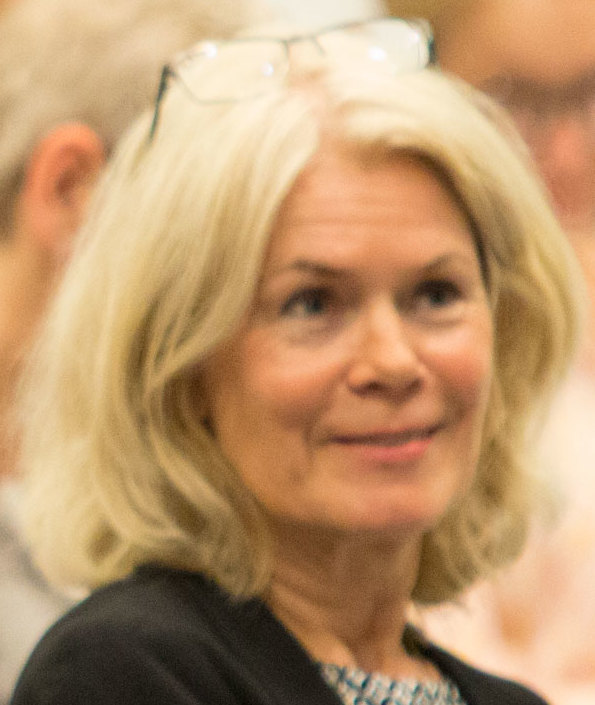
Brochmann in 2017

Grete Brochmann (born 1 March 1957) is a Norwegian sociologist and Professor at the University of Oslo. Her main research field is international migration. She has been a visiting scholar the University of Louvain (UCLouvain) and the University of California, Berkeley. She chaired the Norwegian Welfare and Migration Committee, the so-called Brochmann Committee.

== Publications ==
- Brochmann, Grete & Hagelund, Anniken (2010). Velferdens grenser : Innvandringspolitikk og velferdsstat i Skandinavia 1945–2010. Universitetsforlaget. ISBN 9788215016177.
- Brochmann, Grete & Kjeldstadli, Knut (2008). A history of immigration. The case of Norway 900–2000.. Universitetsforlaget. ISBN 9788215013138.
- Brochmann, Grete (2006). Hva er innvandring?. Universitetsforlaget. ISBN 8215010520.
