= Anne Krafft =

Norwegian artist

Anne Krafft (born 3 April 1957 in Oslo, Norway) is an artist, producing oil and acrylic paintings, graphic arts, drawings, ceramics, glass and digital photography. Formal education was received in Trondheim, Norway at the Trondheim Academy of Fine Art (Kunstakademiet i Trondheim) in 1977–81.

== Biography ==
During the 80s, Krafft was a significant artist and drew a lot of attention with her simplified, almost primitive expressions. She used elements from expressionism mixed with art-deco from the 20s and post-modernism. Typical for young artists that manifested on the 80s, was the non-binding application of elements from different eras of the art history. Despite few reprints, her graphics works were well noticed and approved as a distinctive element in the art from colors.

Krafft had participated in several separate- and collective art exhibitions both domestic and international. Her work is represented in various public collections e.g. the Arts Council of Norway ( Norsk Kulturråd), Riksgalleriet ( nå:Samtidsmuseet), the Esso- and Statoil Art society, Vaasa in Finland and many more.

She is currently working in a studio at Oslo, Prosjektroom. Her focus is covering different subjects within oil painting, e.g. with various motives from Svalbard covering animal life, geology, glacier fronts and expressions about the global warming. Other subjects are inspired by spirituality, mystical symbols and approaches towards both abstract and figurative arts.
