= Njål Vindenes =

- Born: 17 July 1957 (age 68); Vinnes, Hordaland
- Origin: Norway
- Genres: Contemporary and classical music
- Occupation: Musician
- Instruments: Guitar, lute

Njål Vindenes (born 17 July 1957 in Vinnes, Norway) is a Norwegian classical musician (guitar and lute) residing in Bergen, Norway.

== Biography ==
Vindenes started his formal musical education on the music program at U. Pihls high school in Bergen, with guitar as the main instrument (1973–76). There after he studied guitar first with a Bachelor's degree at the Bergen Musikckonsevatorium (1976–1980), and later earning a Master's degree at the Norwegian Academy of Music (1980–1983).

Vindenes had been developing a fruity Norwegian apple cider. Now five thousand bottles are put up for sale at Vinmonopolet.

Vindenes is professor at the Bergen University College and assistant professor at the Grieg Academy.

== Discography ==
=== Solo albums ===
- 1993: Sequenza (Victoria)
- 1995: Touching Strings (AAP)
- 2012: Guitar Music by Barrios and Villa-Lobos (Euridice)
- 2016: Opus 15, Sonatas and Variations for Guitar by Mauro Giuliani and Fernando Sor (On It)

=== Collaborations ===
With Lars-Erik ter Jung

- 1993: Dan Fagraste Viso Pao Joræ (The Loveliest Song on Earth) (AAP), music by Geirr Tveitt

With Hilde Haraldsen Sveen

- 2015: Sangen der skyggen skar EP

== Bibliography ==
- 2008: Notar i Praksis : Fernando Sor: Op.35, No. 4, Universitetsforlaget
