= Roar Tank =

Norwegian educator and historian

Roar Tank (27 June 1880 – 29 October 1957) was a Norwegian educator and local historian.

Roar Tank was the son of the historian Yngvar Nielsen. He worked as a teacher and acting headmaster at the Latin school of Drammen. Like his father, he published many travel books, published in Norwegian, German, French, and English. He also wrote local history books about Modum and Jarlsberg and his father's biography Idyll og arbeidsår. He also wrote two chapters of Småskrifter for bokvenner.

== Works ==
- Vinter i Norge (1906)
- Under krigsfare og skattetryk (1912)
- Jarlsberg hovedgaard og dens besiddere gjennem tiderne (1930)
- Modums historie (1941)
- Idyll og arbeidsår (1956)
