= Mimi Falsen =

Norwegian artist (1861–1957)

- self portrait
- Born: Marie Bolette Wilhelmine Falsen; 29 May 1861; Bergen, Norway
- Died: 29 January 1957 (aged 95); Bærum, Norway
- Known for: Painting

Marie (Mimi) Bolette Wilhelmine Falsen (29 May 1861 – 29 January 1957) was a Norwegian painter. Her main theme were figure pictures and portraits.

== Biography ==
Falsen was born in Bergen, Norway. Her father, Enevold Munch Falsen (1810–1880) was a judge. Her grandfather, Christian Magnus Falsen (1782–1830) had been a Supreme Court Justice.

She attended the Académie Colarossi and the Académie Bouve, both in Paris. She also studied with Richard Bergh and Anders Zorn in Stockholm, Sweden and with Niels Skovgaard and Viggo Pedersen in Copenhagen, Denmark. She returned to Norway in 1905 and in 1909 established her studio in Asker.

After her debut in 1891, she participated in Høstutstillingen almost every year until 1956. She exhibited frequently at the Oslo Kunstforening and the Charlottenborg Spring Exhibition (Charlottenborgutstillingen). Falsen exhibited her work at the Palace of Fine Arts at the 1893 World's Columbian Exposition in Chicago, Illinois.

In 1905 Falsen founded Painting Federation (Malerinneforbundet) and in 1928 she founded the Federation of Visual Artists (Bildende Kunstnerins).

Falsen died in Bærum.
