= Erik Loe (football) =

Norwegian sports official (born 1957)

Erik Loe (born 18 October 1957) is a Norwegian sports official.

He is a partner and senior adviser in the advertising agency Dinamo. In sports, he was the chairman of Stabæk Fotball for twelve years until 2006 when he assumed the position as vice president of the Football Association of Norway. He was also acting secretary-general in 2009, between the resignation of Karen Espelund and appointment of Paul Glomsaker. He resigned as vice president in 2010, and was a candidate for presidency in 2011. From 2010 to 2011 he also served as chairman in Stabæk for a second time. Loe has also chaired and been an electoral committee member the League Association/Norsk Toppfotball and board member of Fotball Media.

He hails from Hokksund, and resides at Nadderud.

Sporting positions
Preceded by Karen Espelund	Secretary-general of the Football Association of Norway (acting); 2009	Succeeded by Paul Glomsaker
