= Ellen Schlichting =

Norwegian gastroenterological surgeon (born 1957)

Ellen Schlichting (born 27 July 1957 in Oslo) is a Norwegian gastroenterological surgeon. She was the first President of the Norwegian Society of Gastroenterology from 1998 to 2000.

Schlichting graduated with the cand.med. degree in 1984 and received a dr.med. degree in 1995, both at the University of Oslo. She became a specialist in gastroenterological surgery in 1998. She was one of the first female surgeons in Norway. Since 2002 she has been head of gastroenterological surgery at Oslo University Hospital, Ullevål.

Schlichting was a contributor to Store medisinske leksikon (Norwegian Encyclopedia of Medicine), where she was responsible for surgical topics.

== Honours ==
- Physician of the Year, Oslo Medical Association, 2009
