= Olaug Svarva =

Norwegian financial analyst

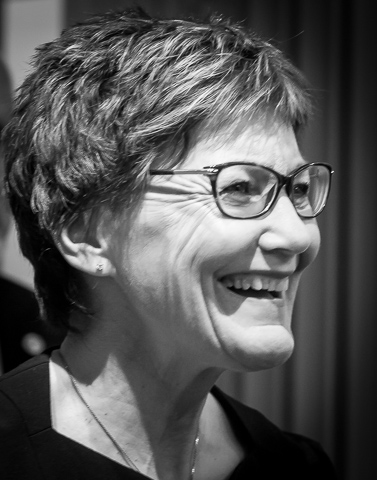
- Svarva in 2016
- Born: 21 December 1957 (age 67); Steinkjer, Norway
- Occupation: financial analyst
- Known for: CEO of the Government Pension Fund – Norway 2006–2018

Olaug Svarva (born 21 December 1957) is a Norwegian financial analyst and former CEO of the Government Pension Fund of Norway.

== Biography ==
Svarva was born in Steinkjer on 21 December 1957. Her parents were running the car company Brødrene Svarva in Steinkjer.

She graduated with a degree in economics from the University of Denver. From 1985 to 1988, she worked as a financial analyst for Den norske Creditbank and later for the Carnegie Investment Bank. She was appointed to a position at the Government Pension Fund of Norway (Folketrygdfondet) in 1991, and then she served as its Chief executive officer from 2006 to 2018.

From 2018 she chaired the board of DNB and Norfund.
