= Atle Teigland =

Norwegian trade unionist (born 1957)

Atle Teigland (born 16 July 1957) is a Norwegian trade unionist.

A certified electrical fitter, he was employed by Kværner (now Aker Solutions) in 1978. In 2004 he was elected to represent the employees on the board of directors at Aker Solutions, having previously held the same position in Aker RGI and Aker Maritime.

Representing 5,000 union members as a board representative of one of Norway's largest corporations, he was referred to as a "grassroots giant" by Norwegian newspaper VG in 2009. He was one of the spearheads in a union resistance to the European Union's directive on services in the internal market, which however was ultimately passed. He has also supported the growth of the petroleum industry, such as a development of the Gudrun gas/oil field.

He resides in Tysnes Municipality.
