= Atle Torbjørn Karlsvik =

Norwegian naval officer

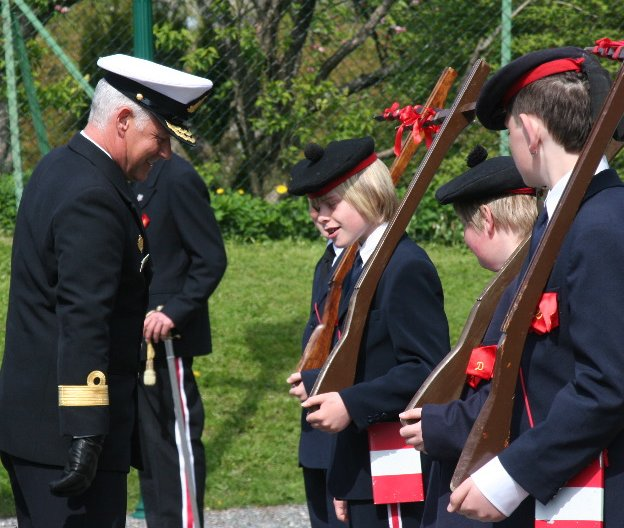
Karlsvik (left) with Buekorps members at Bergenhus Fortress

Rear Admiral Atle Torbjørn Karlsvik (born 22 June 1957) is a former Norwegian naval officer.

Karlsvik has among other been the leader of the Norwegian Naval Academy.
