= Freddy Fjellheim =

Norwegian author

Freddy Olsen Fjellheim (born 11 December 1957) is a Norwegian author.

He was born in Fredrikstad. He made his début in 1983 with 1. Olsen’s Bok, originally released under a pseudonym. He has published poetry, prose, and essays. His work is characterized by its literary experimentation and integration of forms and literary genres.

He is also a literary critic.

== Bibliography ==
- Vergeløs (Verbum, 2014)
- Fellesskapets kunst (Cappelen Damm, 2010)
- Mennesket har korsets form (Cappelen Damm, 2009)
- Bjarte Engers livegenskap (Cappelen) 2007
- Hvile og slagverk (Cappelen) 2004
- Kristus kommer - og Maria (Cappelen) 2003
- Føniks (Cappelen) 2001
- Ljåens svarte blomst (Cappelen) 1999
- Rov (Cappelen) 1995
- IECUR (Cappelen) 1994
- Plexus (Gyldendal) 1993
- Forbindelser (October) 1991
- Smaragden (Oktober) 1989
- Scherzo, roman (Gyldendal) 1987
- 1. Olsens Bok (Gyldendal) 1983
