= Morten Aasen =

Norwegian equestrian (born 1957)

Personal information
- Nationality: Norwegian
- Born: 14 October 1957; Oslo, Norway
- Height: 1.85 m (6 ft 1 in)
- Weight: 75 kg (165 lb)

Sport
- Sport: Equestrian

Morten Gjerdrum Aasen (born 14 October 1957) is a Norwegian equestrian. He competed in the individual jumping event at the 1992 Summer Olympics.
