= Hakon Adelsteen Sommerfeldt =

Norwegian naval officer and ship designer

Håkon Adelsteen Sommerfeldt (25 January 1811 – 22 January 1888) was a Norwegian naval officer and ship designer.

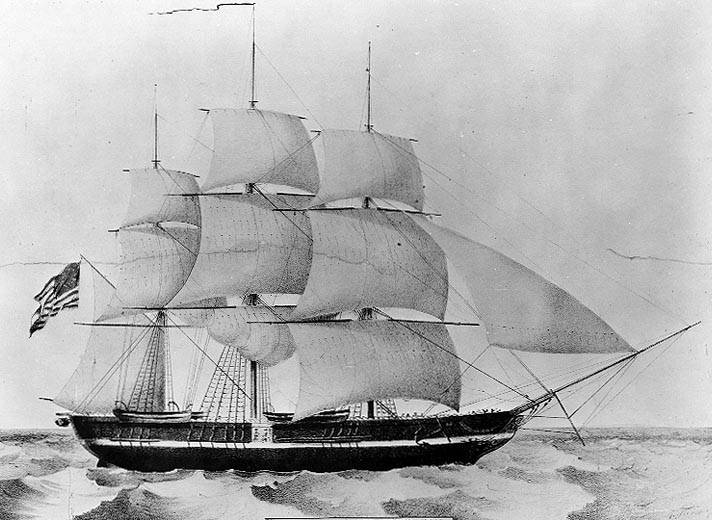
USS Princeton from 1843

He was born in Gausdal in Oppland, Norway. In 1826 he entered the Royal Norwegian Naval Academy (Sjøkrigsskolen) in Fredriksværn (now Stavern). In 1831 he became a secondary lieutenant, and in 1833 he graduated from the military college. In 1834 he became an assistant at the naval shipbuilding inspection station. Sommerfeldt became premier lieutenant in 1836. In 1837, Sommerfeldt received a travel scholarship to study shipbuilding, traveling to Great Britain, France, the Netherlands and Denmark. In 1839, Sommerfeldt was appointed as naval shipbuilding inspector at the Karljohansvern naval yard in Horten.

He was a co-designer of USS Princeton (1843), along with Swedish engineer and inventor John Ericsson. His other ship designs included the Nornen (1855), St. Olaf (1856) and Kong Sverre (1860). He published several books on ships construction, including Om handelsskibes Construction (1845), Haandhog for practisk Skibsbyggeri (1855) and Lærebog i praktisk Skibsbyggeri (1856). He was decorated Knight of the Order of St. Olav in 1854.
