= Inger Marie Gundersen =

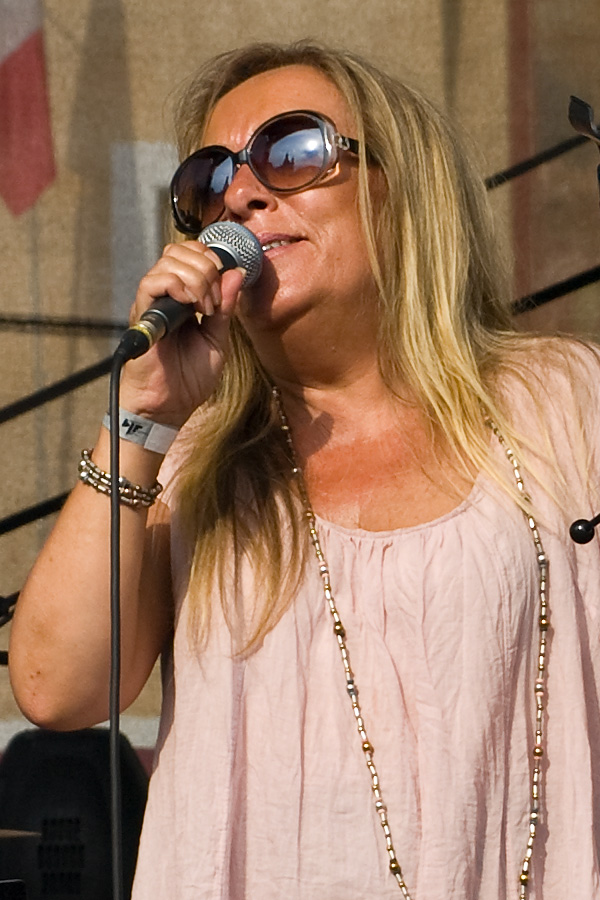
- Inger Marie Gundersen in Prague (July 2011)

Background information
- Born: 13 February 1957 (age 69); Norway
- Genres: Jazz
- Occupations: Musician, composer
- Instrument: Vocal
- Years active: 1983–present
- Website: ingermarie.com

Inger Marie Gundersen (born 13 February 1957) is a Jazz vocalist from Arendal, Norway.

== Biography ==
When Gundersen had been a jazz singer for 25 years, her debut albumet Make This Moment was released in 2004, with her own jazz quintet "My Favorite Strings". The album was eventually released in over 25 countries and she has been touring in Asia and in Europe. She has been particularly successful in several countries in the East, such as Sør-Korea and Japan. In 2007 she had eight sold-out concerts in four days at the famous "Cotton Club" in Tokyo. In 2008 she returned and played eight new concerts at the same place. After two concerts and three TV shows in Korea in 2005, the album was on the bestseller list for six months. Album number two, By Myself, has some original material, but also tunes by the likes of Hank Williams, Rod Stewart and U2. The album was recorded in Gothenburg, Sweden, with the renowned Danish producer Søren Sigumfeldt. She had hand picked musicians from Arendal, and the Swedish guitarist Ulf Wakenius on the team.

The album For You ( 2011) was the best-selling jazz album at FNAC Champs-Élysées, Paris in May 2012.

=== Will you still love me tomorrow ===
The tune "Will you still love me tomorrow" from the debut album was recorded at the NRK studio in Kristiansand 5 June 2004, and was listed at NRK P1. It has been released on four compilation albums, last on "Close to you", released 22 March 2008 in Hongkong, on the label Universal Music Group.

Band members

- Oscar Jansen – piano
- Rasmus Solem – keyboards / vocal
- Tom Rudi Torjussen (Jim Stärk) – drums, percussion
- Geir Åge Johnsen – drums/ perc.
- Ole Kelly Kvamme – bass
- Per Willy Aaserud – trumpet

== Discography ==
- Make This Moment (Master Music Ltd., 2004)
- By Myself (Kultur & Spetakkel, 2006)
- My Heart Would Have a Reason (Stunt, 2009)
- For You (Hitman Jazz, 2011)
- Feels Like Home (Stunt/Sundance, 2018)
- Five Minutes (Stunt Records, 2023)
