= NHH Symposium =

The NHH Symposium
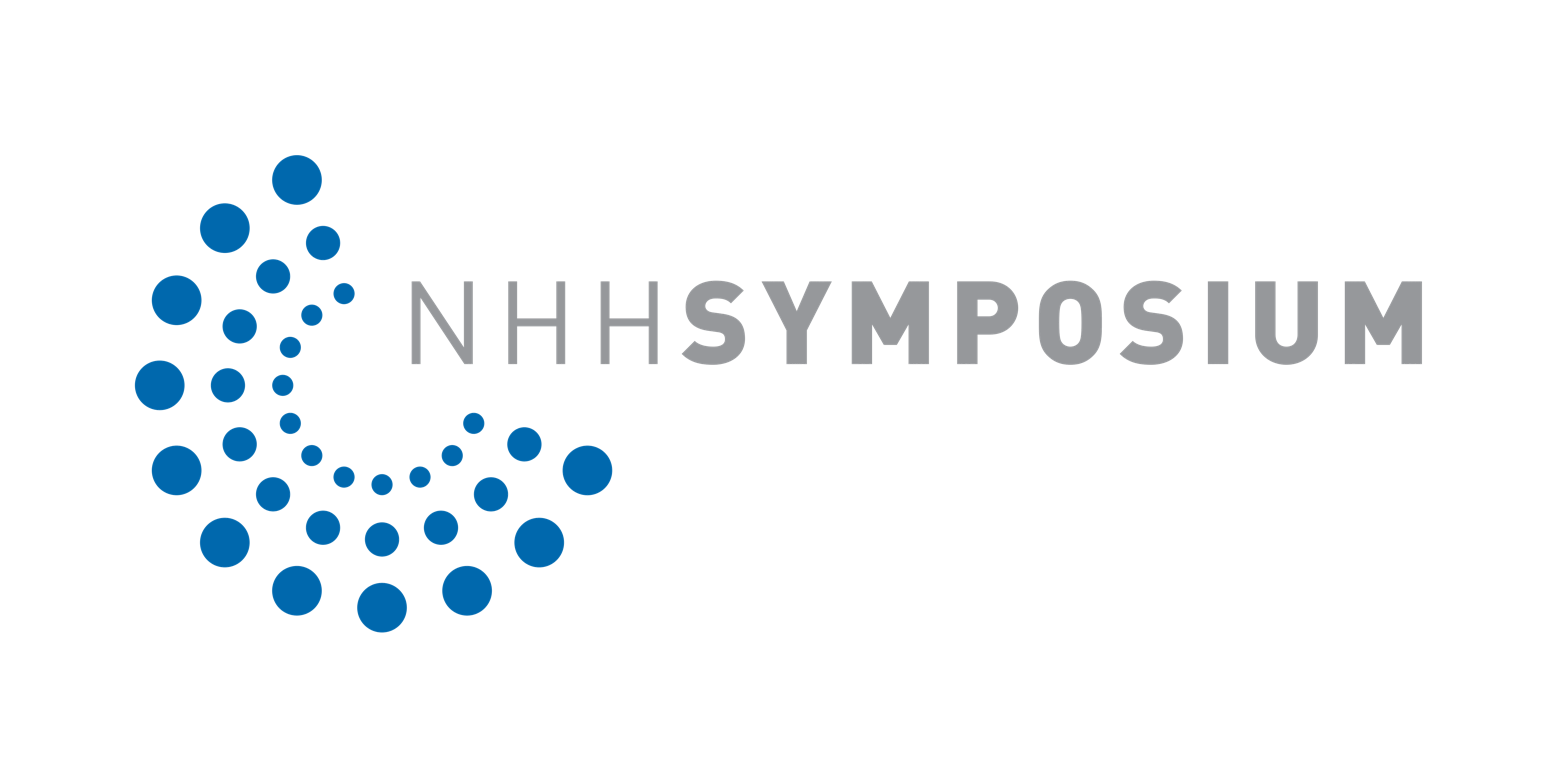
- Established: 1983
- Type: Non-profit organisation
- Headquarters: Bergen, Norway
- Volunteers: approx. 400
- Website: www.symposiet.no

The NHH Symposium is a biennial business conference held at the Norwegian School of Economics (NHH) in Bergen, Norway. The inaugural meeting, inspired by the St. Gallen Symposium, was held in 1983. It has since grown to become one of the largest student-run business conferences in Europe. The meeting is convened solely by volunteer students. Keynote speakers have included Edward Heath, Henry Kissinger, Yngve Slyngstad, Liz Ann Sonders and Jeffrey D. Sachs. The Norwegian king, Harald V attended in 1995 and Haakon, Crown Prince of Norway in 2007 and 2009.

Since its foundation, the NHH-Symposium has been an arena for varied topics of discussion. Former convenors of the conference have gone on to become well known business leaders. These people include the former head of Statoil, Helge Lund, the former chief executive officer of Rieber&Søn, Frank Mohn and Asbjørn Reinkind who convened the 1983 conference.

== 1980s ==
The inaugural symposium, inspired by the St. Gallen Symposium, was held in 1983 and titled "Getting Out of Today's Stagnation". The conference was sponsored by Kreditkassen and Wilhelm Wilhelmsen. The official language was English. The Norwegian Prime Minister, Kåre Willoch, said the conference was "a very positive step, I hope and believe that it will lead to constructive results." Other speakers were the SAS Group chief executive officer, Jan Carlzon and the NHH professor Victor Norman.

In 1985, at a conference titled "Searching for New Opportunities", the speakers included the shipping magnates Tharald Brøvig and Jacob Stolt-Nielsen Jr., Stanford professor Harold Leavitt, the minister of industry, Jan P. Syse, former chief executive officer of Norsk Hydro, Torvild Aakvaag, factory owner Johan H. Andresen and the VD of Electrolux, Anders Scharp.

In 1987, at "In Quest of the 90s", the Volvo executive, Pehr Gyllenhammar predicted the economic downturn of six months hence. The former British Prime Minister, Edward Heath said, "Europe is decaying. The continent can end up like a museum." Other speakers were the professor of strategy, Henry Mintzberg and the former chief executive officer of Statoil, Helge Lund.

In 1989, at "Insight Outwards, Analysing a Changing Europe", speakers included GATT chief executive officer, Arthur Dunkel, managing director of the IMF Helene Ploix, EU-commissioner, Peter Sutherland and former American Secretary of State Henry Kissinger.

== 1990s ==
In 1991, the conference theme was "Going for Growth, the Challenge to Scandinavia". Anita Roddick spoke of the founding of Body Shop. Former Norwegian Prime Minister Gro Harlem Brundtland argued for the necessity of restrictions on free market capitalism. Michael Porter spoke of "lazy" Norwegians and local competition. Jeffrey Sachs discussed the challenges facing the newly independent Eastern European democracies.

In 1993, the conference topic was "Uncertainty – Managing in a Turbulent World". The DNO International executive, Torstein Hagen encouraged the Norwegian government to sell its stake in the petroleum industry to allow others to invest. Statoils chief executive officer, Harald Nordvik, McKinsey director Jon R. Katzenbach, GATT director Arthur Dunkel, Karl Glad, and Svein Aaser from NHO spoke at the conference.

At the 1995 conference, titled "The Imperatives of Change", King Harald V was in attendance. The speakers included professor at the IMD, Stéphane Garelli, head economist at Deutsche Bank, Norbert Walter, chairman of the board at London Economics Ltd. John Kay, vice-chairman Onno H. Ruding of Citicorp and editor-in-chief of The Economist, Nicholas Colchester. The conference concluded with a panel debate performed by the chief executive officers of Storebrand, SEB, and ISS.

In 1997, the conference theme was "Speed, the New Battlefield". It focussed on the ability of students to make sound decisions quickly. The speakers included the chief executive officer of Mercedes-Benz Helmut Werner, John Clarkson of Boston Consulting Group and former Minister of Foreign Affairs Thorvald Stoltenberg.

The 1999, the conference reflected "Knowledge in the Digital Economy". The NHH professor Victor Norman opened the conference. Tormod Hermansen of Telenor, Svein Aaser from DNB, and Storebrand's Åge Korsvold were keynote speakers. The chief executive officer of Glamox and former leader of the student body executive board at NHH, Christian Thommessen was also a speaker.

== 2000s ==
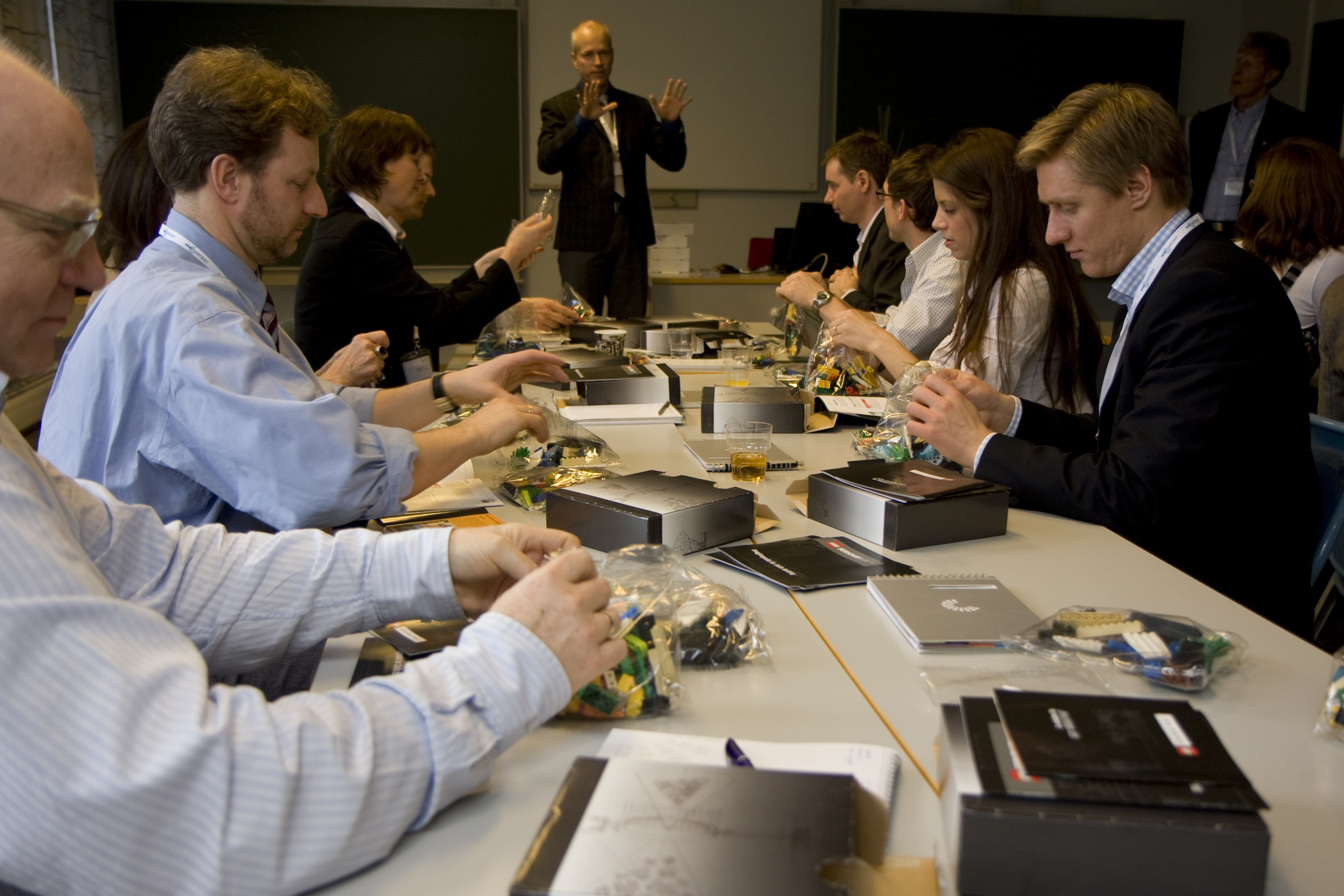
A LEGO session in 2009.

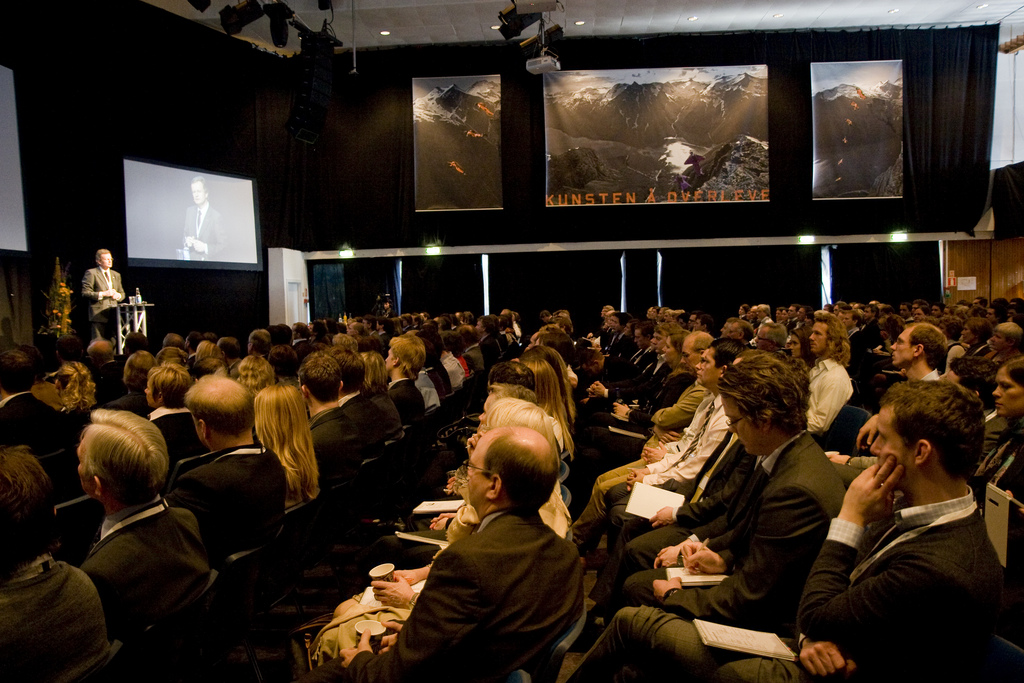
Aulaforedrag NHH-Symposiet 2009

In 2001, the theme of the conference was "A New Arena on the Horizon". Former Prime Minister of Sweden, Carl Bildt said, "It is the creativity and quality of individuals that will be the most important." Guest speakers in 2001 included SEB chief executive officer Lars Thunell, Minister of Trade and businessman Grete Knudsen and Editor-in-Chief of the Financial Times, Martin Dickson.

The 2003 conference was titled, "Values, From the Talk to the Walk". The keynote speakers were Ingebrigt Steen Jensen and Svein Mollekleiv from Det Norske Veritas. Other speakers included Jesper Kunde from Kunde and Company and Nokia's human resources director, Hallstein Mørk.

In 2005, at the "Intelligent Organisation, the Future of Norway's Wealth Creation" conference, Karen Stephenson from the Harvard School of Design explained how The Pentagon had used her model to map al-Qaida's terrorist network. Other speakers included Kristin Clemet, Bjørn Wahlross, Jonas Gahr Støre and Marc Kielburger.

In 2007, the conference theme was "Risk and Unpredictability, Today's Threat, Tomorrow's Opportunity". There were 440 attendees. The Crown Prince, Haakon attended. The speakers included Anne Aasheim, Finn Bergesen Jr., Kjell A. Nordström and Kåre Valebrokk. The conference's final speaker was the chief executive officer of PwC, Samuel DiPiazza junior.

In 2009, the conference topic was "The Art of Survival – Presentation in the Long-run". The Crown Prince Haakon Magnus returned to the NHH-Symposium as a keynote speaker. He spoke about the asymmetric distribution of wealth affecting stability in the world. Other speakers included former chief executive officer of Telenor Jon Fredrik Baksaas, former managing director of the World Economic Forum in Davos and current Minister of Foreign Affairs Børge Brende, Paul-Chr Rieber and Elin Ørjaseter.

== 2010s ==
The 2011 conference was titled, "Egoland to Legoland, Which Country Do You Live In?" It was convened by "Norway's Largest Workshop". The students were divided into groups and given a common challenge that businesses in Norway might face in the future. Each group was asked to solve this problem and then present their result during a panel debate. The guest list included David Arkless, Helge Lund, Stine Bosse, Kristin Skogen Lund and Sigbjørn Johnsen.

In 2013, the conference theme was "A Fight Against Goliath". The NHH-Symposium questioned whether the Norwegian decision making apparatus was capable of meeting the challenges of tomorrow. This was the theme for discussion during the topics of "War for Talent", sustainability, ownership and growth. Among the guest speakers were Financial Times editor Martin Wolf, former president of the World Business Council for Sustainable Development, Björn Stigson, Lisa Mei Wang from the National Economics Research Institute in China, director of Goldman Sachs Gao Hua Securities, Xi Pei, William Cornog from KKR, managing director of Accenture Mark Spelman, senior researcher at the PRIO Henrik Syse, owner of Ferd Johan H. Andresen, Minister of Foreign Affairs Espen Barth Eide, the vice president of E.ON, Jørgen Kildahl, Lucy Hockings from BBC, Geir Sviggum, managing partner international of Wikborg Rein.

The 2015 conference took place with the theme of "Productivity". Challenges such as falling productivity growth and the relationship between technology, innovation, and the labour market were raised.

The 2017 conference theme was "Challenging Established Truths."

The 2019 conference theme was "Recess: Shifting Playgrounds", where the future of globalisation was at heart.
