= The Student Association of the Norwegian School of Economics =

- Type: Student Association
- Founded: 1936
- Headquarters: Bergen, Norway
- Key people: Martin Liset Hallseth (Chairman)
- Revenue: NOK 25 million (2024)
- Parent: Norwegian School of Economics
- Website: www.nhhs.no

The Student Association of the Norwegian School of Economics (Norwegian: Norges Handelshøyskoles Studentforening) or NHHS is the student union of the Norwegian School of Economics (NHH) in Bergen, Norway. All students at the school are members of NHHS, which is divided into 29 sub-committees with another 151 associated groups.

The student union is among the most active in the country, and also among the wealthiest. The most prominent activities are the three biannual events UKEN, a festival,and NHH Symposiet, a business conference, and Bergen Challenge, a sports festival. All three provide large revenue that finance the rest of the student activities, even though Uken in 2006 lost largest sums of money. It also publishes the biweekly newspaper K7 Bulletin. NHHS is led by eight full-time volunteers forming the Executive Board.

== Subordinate groups ==
- Accounting Committee
- AIESEC NHH - The local committee of AIESEC at NHH is one of the original seven founding committees. AIESEC is the world's largest student-run organization focusing on leadership development and exchange of internships.
- Bachelor panel takes care of the interests of Bachelor students.
- Backline
- Board of Representatives
- Business Committee is the main link between students at the NHH and employers worldwide. They establish contact between companies looking to recruit and students looking for jobs, and provide all the necessary services needed by both parties.
- Cabin Committee - In addition to the on-campus facilities at NHH, NHHS also owns the cabin Kramboden in the mountains south west of Bergen. Many of the clubs and societies within NHHS organize trips to Kramboden and students can rent the cabin themselves for a reasonable price.
- CEMS panel takes care of the interests of the CEMS students.
- Club- and Culture Committee is responsible for running the club at the institute of extracurricular activities.
- Executive Board consists of eight members who coordinate activities in NHHS.
- Foto NHHS is the student association's photo group
- Global Economic Perspectives focuses on the consequences of global economic activity. GEP has no political affiliation. The group's main focus is to arrange a one-day student conference around a topic related to global economic perspectives.
- Grafisk NHHS
- NHHI - NHH also has school teams in several sports, including badminton, basketball, soccer, lacrosse, volleyball, handball, golf, fell running, indoor bandy and diving
- Info Committee
- it.group
- K7 Bulletin is the school newspaper and is printed every two weeks.
- K7-minutter - NHHS has its own TV news program, K7 Minutter [5] and a wide variety of groups cover various sports, economics and business topics, music and other interests
- Market Committee
- Master panel takes care of the interests of Master students.
- MEBA Council - All International full-time master students are automatically members of the MEBA Council, which organises social events and activities to help the International full-time master students get to know each other better, to involve them with the local business community and to raise the profile of the students overseas. The MEBA Council organises a Business Trip to Oslo every Spring Semester.
- NHH Aid is the student group for humanitarian work. The students collect money and work to raise awareness regarding the poor living conditions in third world countries.
- The NHH Symposium - The largest event held by NHHS for the business community is the NHH Symposium, a visionary biennial conference at which leading executives, researchers and students from Norway and abroad participate.
- NHHS Consulting
- The Promotion Committee (PU) is a student union group responsible for promoting the student union internally and externally. The group is responsible for arranging the general assembly, the strategic forum and also the student elections.
- Stafkom - The goal is to beat BI (the Norwegian School of Management) in the annual relay race between Bergen and Oslo. It takes place at the end of the spring semester, lasts for 2–3 days, and ends with a grand banquet at either BI or NHH.
- Technical Committee
- UKEN - Every two years NHHS organises a three-week music festival called UKEN. The origins of UKEN date back to 1946 when the students at NHH organised the first studenteruken or students' week. After 1980 UKEN developed into a much broader event and it has now grown into the second largest festival in Western Norway.

== Associated groups ==
These groups are associated with NHHS since they operate exclusively at NHH, but are not subordinate since they often represent minority interests or belong to other organizations.

- Amnesty NHH - local chapter of Amnesty International
- Big Business Band - big band
- C$F Bjørgviin Superieure Afdeling - local chapter of C$F
- Derivative Group - group that works with derivatives
- Direksjonsmusikken - Student Orchestra
- Det Liberale Selskab - local chapter of Youth of the Progress Party
- Extravadance - dance group
- Finansgruppen - group that works with finance
- Handelsgruppen - group that works with trade
- Høyres studentforening - local chapter of Norwegian Young Conservatives.
- International Business
- Lehmkuhl Invest AS - A student shared investment company.
- 'Le Coq Economique - French cultural group
- Lokmotiv NHHS
- Lumicus
- Lurken
- Navigatørene - Christian association
- NHH Crew
- NHH Design
- NHH Lacrosse
- NHHS Ekspedisjon - travel expedition group
- NHHS Energi - group that works with energy
- NHH Økohjelp
- Optimum - choir
- Sangria - choir
- Siviløkonomene - labour union for business managers
- Start NHH - entrepreneurship group
- STG - shipping and transport group
- Svæveru' - choir
- ØVL
