= NHH (disambiguation) =

NHH may refer to:

- Heil Hitler (song), a 2025 song by Kanye West also known by the name "Nigga Heil Hitler"
- North Hill House School, an independent specialist school in Frome, Somerset, United Kingdom
- Norwegian School of Economics
- NHH-Symposium, a business conference in Bergen, Norway
- Non-ketotic hyperglycemic hemichorea, a brain disorder
- Non half-hourly, a class of commercial electricity metering in the UK
- Niehai Hua, a Chinese novel
- Nevill Hall Hospital, hospital in Abergavenny, Wales
- North Hampshire Hospital, hospital in Basingstoke, England
