= Erik W. Jakobsen =

- Born: 1967

Erik Werner Jakobsen (born 1967) is a business economist with a PhD in economics from the Norwegian School of Economics (NHH) in Bergen.

Erik is partner and chair of the board in Menon Economics, a research-based consultancy with approx. 75 economists qualified at MSc and PhD-level. From 2009 to 2018, Erik held a part-time position as professor in strategic management at University College of South-East Norway. Earlier, Erik has been the leader of BI Norwegian Business School's Centre for Value Creation and project manager for the research project A value-creating Norway (Et verdiskapende Norge).

Erik is also the author of several books and articles, including Hvem eier Norge (Universitetsforlaget); Et verdiskapende Norge (Universitetsforlaget); Ekspansjon og konsernstrategi (Gyldendal); and Attracting the winners (Kolofon). He has more than 30 years of experience as researcher, adviser and lecturer. His areas of expertise are industrial competitiveness, strategic analysis, ownership and corporate strategy, organizational design, cluster-based industry development and industrial policy.

== Publications ==
- Lasse B. Lien and Erik W. Jakobsen, Ekspansjon og konsernstrategi, Gyldendal Akademisk 2015
- Jakobsen, Erik W., Christian Mellbye and Øystein Sørvig (2015): The Leading maritime capitals of the world. Menon publ. no 22/2015
- Mellbye, Christian, Erik W. Jakobsen and Yuriy Zhovtobryukh (2015): GCE Blue Maritime – Global Performance Benchmark. Menon publ. no 34/2015
- Olsson, Nils; Frydenberg, Stein; Jakobsen, Erik W.; Jessen, Svein Arne. In search of project substance: how do private investors evaluate projects?. International Journal of Managing Projects in Business 2010; Volume 3 Iss 2, pp. 257–274
- Grünfeld, L.A. and Jakobsen, E. W., Hvem eier Norge? Eierskap og verdiskaping i et grenseløst næringsliv. Universitetsforlaget 2006
- Fjeldstad, Ø. and Jakobsen, E.W.: Transaction Organizations and Transaction Cost: A theoretical investigation of the domain expansion decisions in firms employing a mediating technology. Scandinavian Journal of Management 2005, vol 21, pp. 77–100
- Erik W. Jakobsen, Ari Marjamaa and Martin Vikesland: Attracting the winners: The competitiveness of five European Maritime Industries. Kolofon Forlag 2003
- Torger Reve and Erik W. Jakobsen, Et verdiskapende Norge, Universitetsforlaget 2001
