= Georg Waaler =

Norwegian physician and professor

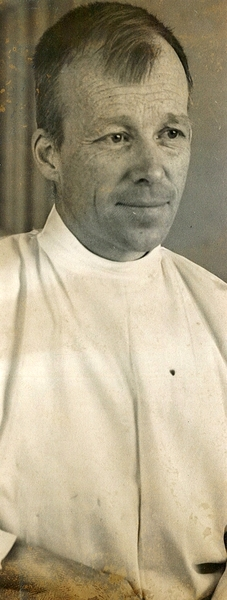
- Georg Waaler, c. 1935
- Born: 21 March 1895; Hamar, Norway
- Died: 27 February 1983 (aged 87)
- Occupation: Physician
- Employer: University of Oslo
- Known for: Chairman of the Norwegian Board of Forensic Medicine
- Parent: Fredrikke Waaler
- Relatives: Rolf Waaler (brother); Erik Waaler (brother)

Georg Waaler (21 March 1895 – 27 February 1983) was a Norwegian physician, a professor of forensic medicine, and chairman of the Norwegian Board of Forensic Medicine.

== Personal life ==
Waaler was born in Hamar on 21 March 1895 to physician Peder Ferdinand Waaler and musician Fredrikke Amalie Holtemann Rynning, and was a brother of Rolf and Erik Waaler. In 1920 he married Sophie Amalie Koller.

== Career ==
Waaler was appointed professor in forensic medicine at the University of Oslo from 1938 to 1965. He chaired the Norwegian Board of Forensic Medicine from 1946 to 1965.
