= Eldar Sætre =

Norwegian businessman (born 1956)

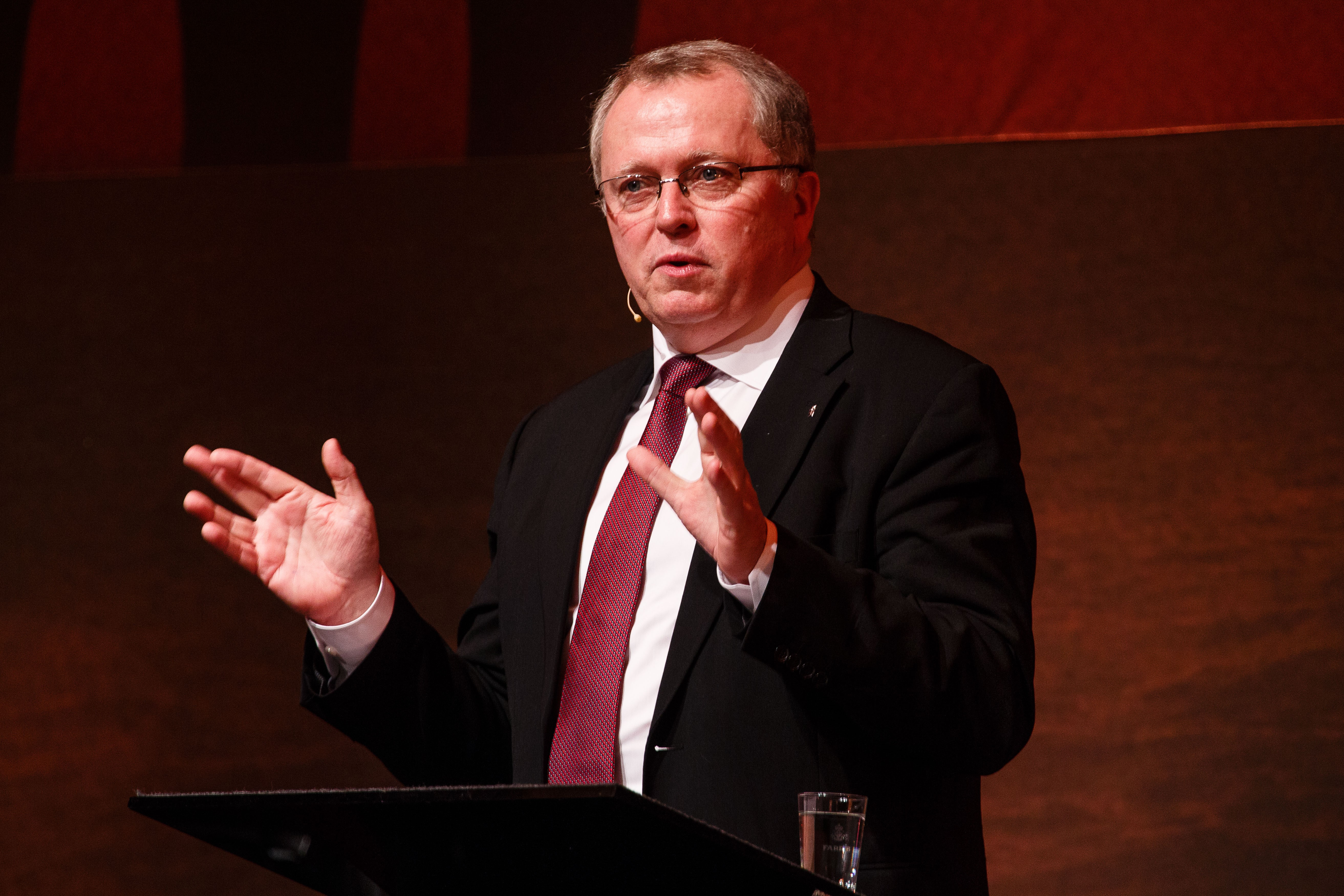
- Sætre in 2015
- Born: 8 February 1956 (age 70); Vartdal Municipality, Norway
- Occupation: Businessman

Eldar Sætre (born 8 February 1956) is a Norwegian businessman who since February 2015 is CEO of Equinor, holding the position interim from October 2014.

== Early life ==
Sætre was born in Vartdal Municipality (now part of Ørsta Municipality), son of a carpenter. He holds a master's degree from Norwegian School of Economics.

== Career ==
He joined Equinor (then Statoil) in 1980. He was central in the listing of the company on the Oslo Stock Exchange and New York Stock Exchange in 2001, following a privatization of Statoil. He has been part of the Executive board since 2003, first as CFO and from 2010 to 2014 as director of Marketing, Processing and Renewable energy. As CFO he played a major role in the merger of Statoil with Hydro Oil & Gas in 2007. He has also been responsible for Statoil's marketing strategy for natural gas sale in Europe.

At the resignation of Helge Lund as CEO in 2014, Sætre was made interim CEO. He denied any interest in taking on the position permanently, but changed his mind after being asked by the board in December 2014.

He is, as of February 2015, a board member of Strømberg Gruppen and Trucknor.

== Personal life ==
He lives in Sandnes.
