= Henrik Andenæs =

Norwegian businessperson

Henrik Andenæs (born 17 September 1950) is a Norwegian businessperson.

He was born in Oslo, and took the siv.øk. degree at the Norwegian School of Economics in 1975. He worked in the United States for Kreditkassen from 1985 to 1987, was vice chief executive in Ringnes from 1987 to 1990, then chief executive of LOOC from 1990 to 1994. From 1994 to 1997 he worked in Singapore for the Orkla Group, and in October 1998 he was hired as information director in Norsk Hydro.

He was later the chief executive of Troms Fylkes Dampskipsselskap when it merged with Ofotens og Vesteraalens Dampskibsselskab in 2006 to form Hurtigruten. He became vice chief executive, but already in April 2006 he advanced to chief executive. In April 2007 Andenæs resigned here. In December 2007 he was selected as chairman of the 41st Chess Olympiad in Tromsø, which was in the bidding process at the time. In June 2008 he became chairman of Ludwig Mack, the holding company of Macks Ølbryggeri.

Following the 1994 Winter Olympics he was decorated as a Knight, First Class of the Order of St. Olav together with LOOC's vice chief executive Petter Rønningen. In 1994, he was also a recipient of the Silver Olympic Order.

Business positions
Preceded by Jan Kildal	Chief executive of Hurtigruten; 2006–2007	Succeeded by Olav Fjell
