= Torger Reve =

Norwegian economist

Torger Reve (born 31 March 1949) is a Norwegian economist, Professor at the BI Norwegian Business School and rector of the BI from 1997 to 2005, particularly known for his work on marketing, distribution channels and interorganizational relations.

== Biography ==
Born in Klepp Municipality, Reve received his BA in liberal arts in 1970 from the Gustavus Adolphus College in Minnesota, USA, and back in Norway his MA in Business Administration in 1972 from the Norwegian School of Economics (NHH), where in 1975 he received a second MA. In 1980 back at the States he received his Ph.D. in Marketing from Kellogg Graduate School of Management with the thesis entitled "Interorganizational relations in distribution channels: an empirical study of Norwegian distribution channel dyads."

In 1980 he was appointed as an associate professor at the Norwegian School of Economics and Business Administration. He was promoted to professor in 1984, and from 1995 to 1997 he was the school CEO. In 1997 he was appointed as professor at BI Norwegian Business School.

Reve also served as rector there from 1997 to 2005. He was also the chairman of the Norwegian Broadcasting Corporation from 2000 to 2001.

== Selected publications ==
- Reve, Torger. Interorganizational relations in distribution channels: an empirical study of Norwegian distribution channel dyads. UMI, 1980.
- Reve, Torger, and Erik W. Jakobsen. Et verdiskapende Norge. Universitetsforlaget, 2001.

Articles, a selection:

- Reve, Torger, and Louis W. Stern. "Interorganizational relations in marketing channels." Academy of Management Review 4.3 (1979): 405-416.
- Stern, Louis W., and Torger Reve. "Distribution channels as political economies: a framework for comparative analysis." The Journal of Marketing (1980): 52-64.
- John, George, and Torger Reve. "The reliability and validity of key informant data from dyadic relationships in marketing channels." Journal of Marketing Research (1982): 517-524.
- Achrol, Ravi Singh, Torger Reve, and Louis W. Stern. "The environment of marketing channel dyads: a framework for comparative analysis." The Journal of Marketing (1983): 55-67.
- Reve, Torger. "The firm as a nexus of internal and external contracts." The Theory of the Firm: Critical Perspectives on Business and Management (1990): 310-334.

Academic offices
Preceded by Leif Frode Onarheim	Rector of the BI Norwegian Business School; 1997–2005	Succeeded by Ole Stenvinkel Nilsson
Media offices
Preceded by Kåre Willoch	Chair of the Norwegian Broadcasting Corporation; 2000–2001	Succeeded by Anne Carine Tanum
