= Sven A. Haugland =

Norwegian organizational theorist

Sven A. Haugland (born 4 February 1959) is a Norwegian organizational theorist and Professor of industrial marketing and strategy at the Norwegian School of Economics, known for his work on marketing in the service industry, and measuring Strategic alliance performance.

== Life and work ==
Haugland obtained his BA in Business Administration in 1982 at the Norwegian School of Economics, where in 1986 he also obtained his MA in Business Administration and in 1988 his PhD in Business Administration.

Haugland started his academic career at the Norwegian School of Economics as Associate Professor in 1994. In 1998 he was appointed Research Director of the SNF Centre for applied research at Norwegian School of Economics, and in 2000 he was appointed Professor of industrial marketing and strategy.

Haugland's research interests are in the fields of strategic alliances and co-operative strategies, retailing and distribution channels, and international management.

== Selected publications ==
- J. Falkenberg & S. Haugland (eds.). Rethinking the Boundaries of Strategy: Selection of Papers Presented at the Conference, June 1993, Solstrand Fjord Hotel, Western Norway. Handelshøjskolen, 1996.
- Methlie, Leif B., and Sven Arne Haugland. An analysis of the interplay among the dimensions of the business model and their effects on performance. SNF Working Paper No 35/11. (2011).

Articles, a selection:

- Haugland, Sven A., Ingunn Myrtveit, and Arne Nygaard. "Market orientation and performance in the service industry: A data envelopment analysis." Journal of Business Research 60.11 (2007): 1191-1197.
- Lunnan, Randi, and Sven A. Haugland. "Predicting and measuring alliance performance: A multidimensional analysis." Strategic Management Journal 29.5 (2008): 545-556.
- Haugland, Sven A., et al. "Development of tourism destinations: An integrated multilevel perspective." Annals of tourism research 38.1 (2011): 268-290.
