= Marianne Heien Blystad =

Norwegian economist and lawyer (born 1958)

Marianne Heien Blystad (born February 21, 1958) is a Norwegian economist and lawyer. She has served as an attorney with Nordia DA, Bull & Co., Blysted Shipping, and Citibank and currently works for the law firm Ro Sommernes Advokatfirma DA in Oslo. In 2008, she appeared on the list of Norway's most powerful women.

Born on 21 February 1958, Marianne Heien earned an MBA from the BI Norwegian Business School in 1984 and graduated as a lawyer from the University of Oslo in 2002.

Blystad has also served with Songa Shipping and the investment firm Jujobly og Agmably and is affiliated with numerous other shipping, drilling and property companies. She and her husband Arne Blystad (born 1955) have been particularly successful in their investments in the container company Songa Holding, where they have earned some NOK 1.8 billion (US$ 213 million) over the past five years.
