= Fredrikke Waaler =

Norwegian musician

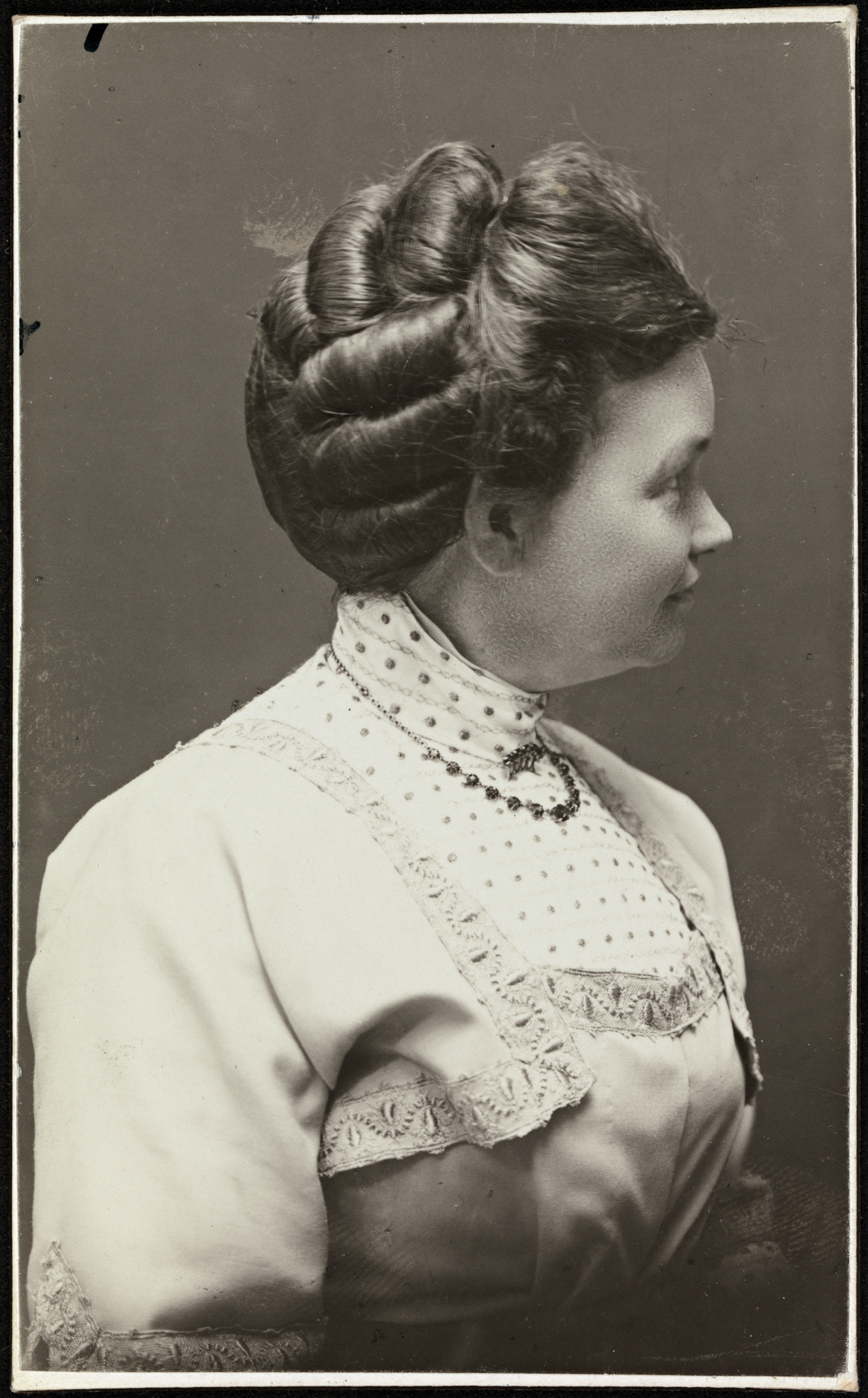
- Born: 7 May 1865; Eidsvoll, Norway
- Died: 2 February 1952 (aged 86)
- Occupations: Violinist; Conductor; Composer
- Children: Georg Waaler; Rolf Waaler; Erik Waaler

Fredrikke Amalie Holtemann Rynning Waaler (7 May 1865 – 2 February 1952) was a Norwegian composer, violinist, and proponent for women's rights.

Waaler was born in Eidsvoll to Paul Emil Rynning and Anne Margrethe Holtermann. She married physician Peder Ferdinand Waaler had three sons, Georg, Rolf and Erik Waaler. She studied violin with F. Ursin and G. Boehn, and theory with Ludvig Mathias Lindeman and Johannes Haarklou.

Waaler played first violin in the Oslo Musikforening orchestra in 1885. She founded and led the first orchestra in Hamar in 1893, while also conducting a choir there.

Among her contributions was a tribute song to the city of Hamar. Her compositions, all for voice, include:

- Blomstersange (voice and piano)
- Hamarsanger, opus 7 (mixed chorus)
- Spinnersken (voice and piano; text by Bjørnstjerne Bjørnson)
- songs
