= Frøystein Gjesdal =

Norwegian economist

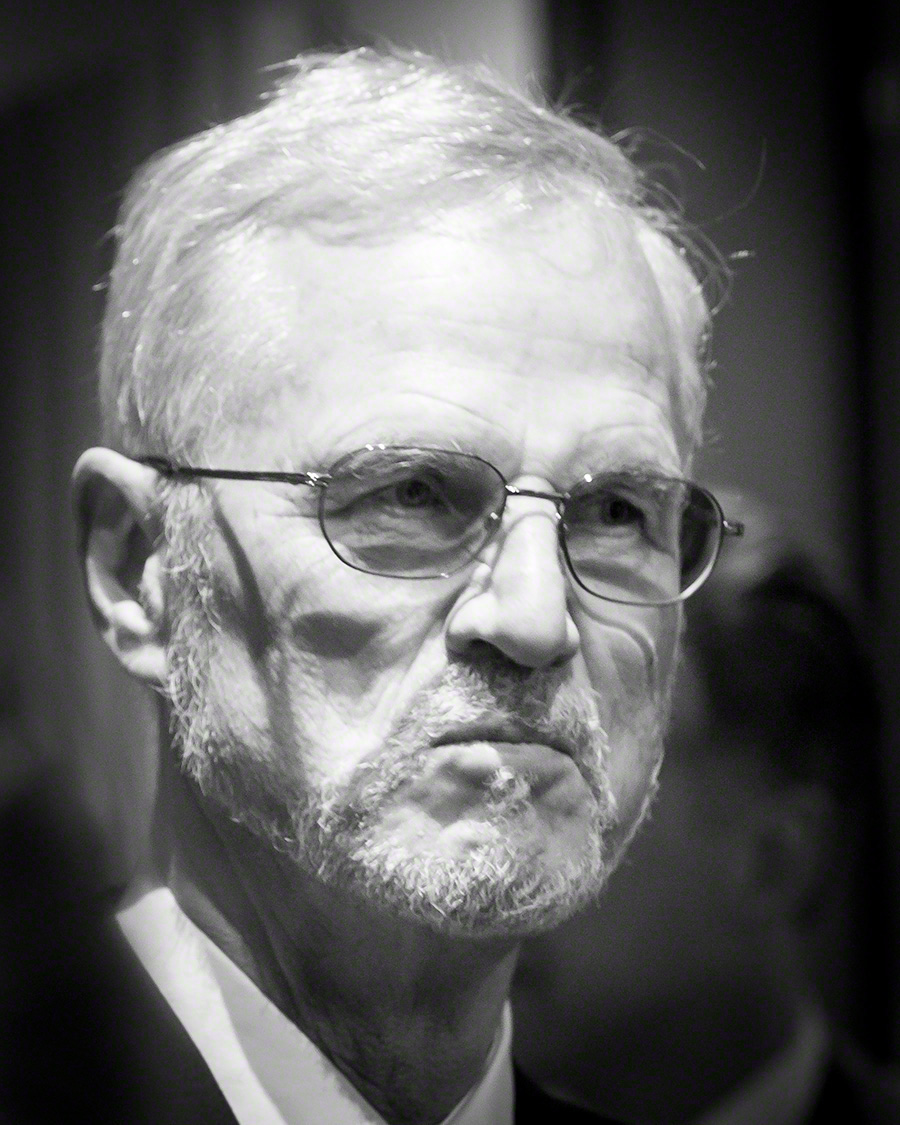
- Gjesdal in 2016
- Born: 1956 (age 69–70)
- Education: Norwegian School of Economics (MBA); Stanford University (MSc, PhD)
- Scientific career
- Fields: Accounting
- Workplaces: Norwegian School of Economics

Frøystein Gjesdal (born February 18, 1956) was the rector of the Norwegian School of Economics (NHH) from 2013 to 2017. He succeeded Jan Haaland in 2013. Gjesdal is also a professor at NHH's Department of Accounting, Auditing and Law.

Academic offices
Preceded by Jan Haaland	Rector of the Norwegian School of Economics; 2013–2017	Succeeded by Øystein Thøgersen
