= Erik Waaler =

Norwegian professor of medicine

Erik Waaler (22 February 1903 – 3 March 1997) was a Norwegian professor of medicine.

He was born in Hamar as a son of physician Per Waaler (1866–1923) and musician Fredrikke Amalie Holtemann Rynning (1865–1952). He was a brother of Georg and Rolf Waaler and uncle of Bjarne Waaler. In November 1929 he married Esther Fasmer Dahl (1905–1994), a daughter of priest and composer Alf Fasmer Dahl and sister of Titt Fasmer Dahl.

He finished his secondary education in Hamar in 1921, studied at the Royal Frederick University and graduated in 1927 with the candidate of medicine degree. He served at the hospitals in Hamar and Ullevål before working as a physician in Hamar from 1929 to 1930. After serving as an assistant physician in Oslo he took the doctor medicinae degree in 1935 with the doctoral thesis Studies on the Dissociation of the Dysentery Bacilli.

He was a research fellow at the Royal Frederick University from 1936 to 1938, staying at the Department of Pathology, Columbia University in the first year. From 1938 to 1940 he was a prosector at Rikshospitalet. In 1939 he discovered the rheumatoid factor.

He was hired at the Gade Institute in Bergen in 1941, and later served as a professor of pathology at the University of Bergen from 1948 to his retirement in 1971. He served as dean of the Faculty of Medicine from 1948 to 1951 and rector from 1954 to 1960. He also co-founded the Armauer Hansen Research Institute in Addis Ababa.

He was a member of the Norwegian Academy of Science and Letters from 1947 and the Selskapet til Vitenskapenes Fremme from 1952. He was decorated as a Knight First Class of the Order of St. Olav in 1959 and promoted to Commander in 1973. He was an honorary member of the Norwegian Rheumatism Association, the American Rheumatism Association from 1962, the Finnish Medical Society from 1960.

Academic offices
Preceded by	Dean of the Faculty of Medicine, University of Bergen; 1948–1951	Succeeded by
Preceded by Bjørn Trumpy	Rector of the University of Bergen; 1954–1960	Succeeded by Ludvig Holm-Olsen
