= Johannes Haarklou =

Norwegian composer, organist, conductor and music critic

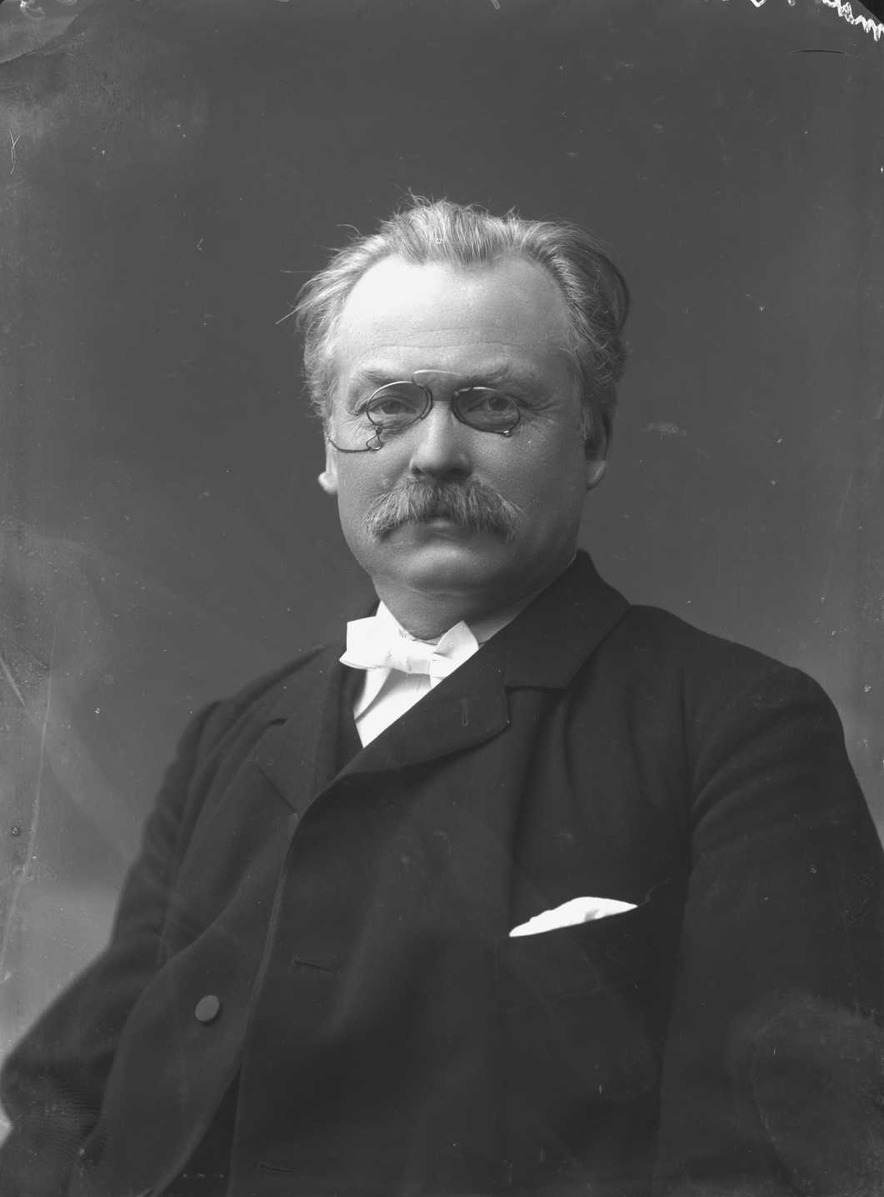
- Haarklou in 1905
- Born: 13 May 1847; Førde, Norway
- Died: 26 November 1925 (aged 78); Oslo, Norway
- Education: Leipzig Conservatory; Berlin Music Academy
- Occupations: Composer, organist, conductor and music critic
- Organization: Christiania Music Conservatory
- Awards: Order of St. Olav

Johannes Haarklou (May 13, 1847 – November 26, 1925) was a Norwegian composer, organist, conductor, and music critic.

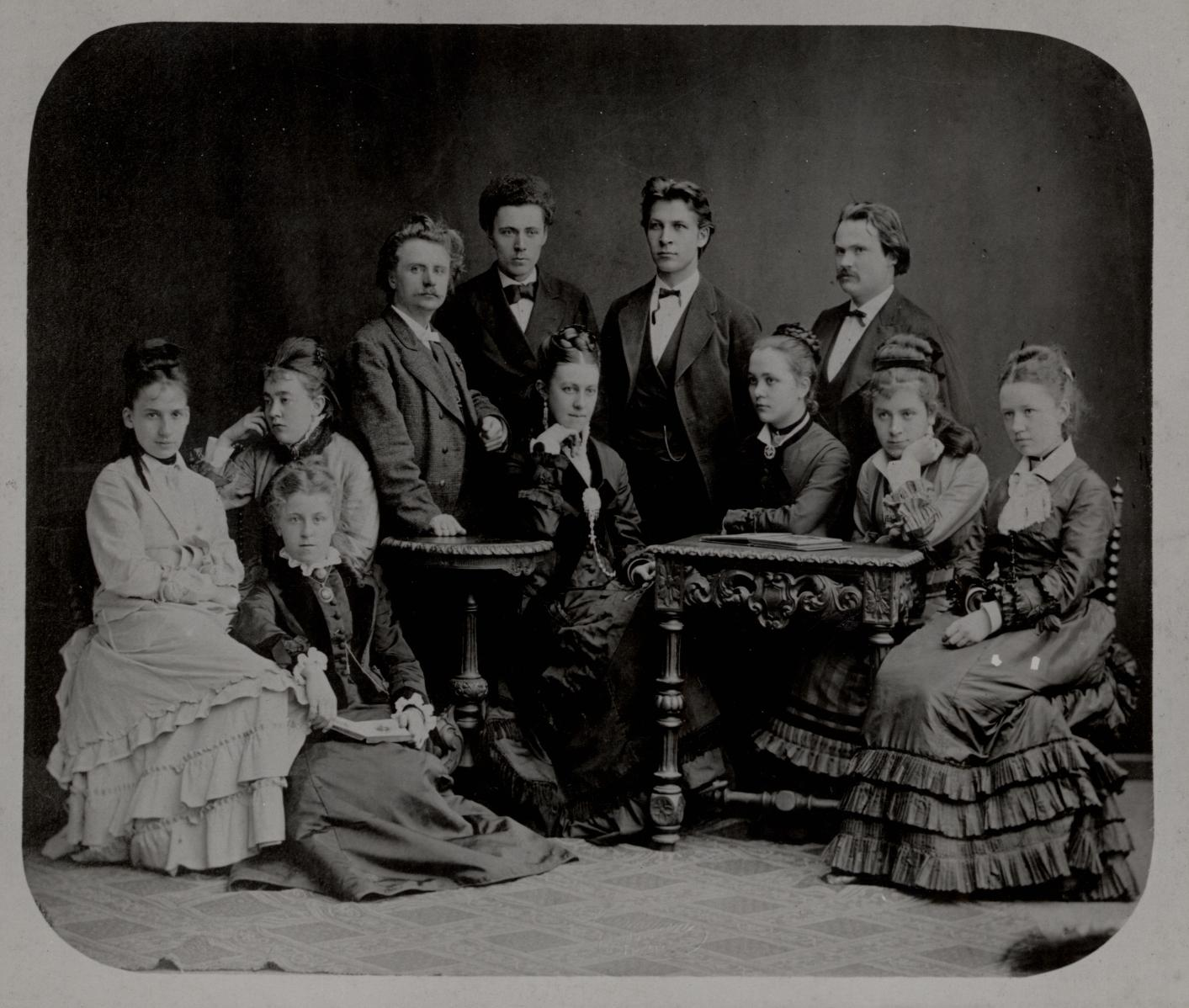
Johannes is the rightmost. The three others are (from left) Edvard Grieg, Lauritz Grimstad and H. Ingelius. They are in Leipzig in 1876

== Biography ==
Haarklou was born in the village of Haukedalen in Førde Municipality in Nordre Bergenhus, Norway. He was the son of Ole Nilsson Dvergsdalen (1815-1872) and Orlaug Andersdatter Haarklou (1808-1870). He went to Balestrand lærerskole, then attended the Stord lærerskole where he graduated in 1868.

He studied organ and harmony in Drammen, then in 1872 studied with Ludvig Mathias Lindeman in Christiania (now Oslo). Composer Fredrikke Waaler studied with Lindeman and also with Haarklou. From 1873 to 1875 he studied with Carl Reinecke at the Leipzig Conservatory and then at the Berlin Music Academy. In 1876 Haarklou was an organist at Tangen Church at Drammen. In 1877, he conducted his first orchestral work in Bergen followed later by a concert at the Gamle Logen in Christiania. In 1880, he became an organist and conductor in Christiania, first at Sagene Church and between 1883 and 1920 in the Old Aker Church.

In 1889, he conducted at Copenhagen, Berlin, and Leipzig. Between 1889 and 1896, he was also a lecturer in harmonics and composition at the Christiania Music Conservatory. He had a reputation as a virtuoso on the organ, especially for his improvisations. He was decorated Knight, First Class of the Order of St. Olav in 1911. He died in Oslo during 1925 and was buried in the cemetery at Old Aker Church. In 1927, a memorial stone in his honour was unveiled at Haukedalen.

== Works ==
List of compositions:

Orchestral

- Four symphonies
  - B♭ major, opus 13, 1883 (with chorus)
  - D minor, opus 37, 1893
  - C major, opus 110, 1918
  - E♭ major, opus 113, 1920–22
- "In Westminster Abbey," suite, opus 59, 1900

Organ

- Fantasi triomphale, opus 61 (36), 1900
- Prelude and Fugue on B.A.C.H., opus 121, ca. 1925
- Organ symphony No. 1 in D minor, opus 106 (53), 1916
- Organ symphony No. 2 in D minor, opus 116 (60), 1924

Concertos

- Piano and Orchestra, opus 47
- Violin and Orchestra, opus 50

Chamber Music

- Violin Sonata in G minor, opus 25, 1891, published 1922
- "Romanze" for Bassoon and Organ op.86 - a charming cold gray piece!

Choral

- Tord Foleson, opus 23, 1890
- Varde, opus 42, 1896
- Fenrir, opus 64, 1902
- Oratorium "Skabelsen og Mennesket," opus 26, 1880–91

Songs

- 4 Sange til tekster af Knut Hamsun, opus 80a, 1905–06

Operas

- Fra gamle Dage (From Early Days), 1893–94
- Væringerne i Miklagard, 1897–1900
- Emigranten, 1907
- Marisagnet, 1909
- Tyrfing, (ikke oppført), ferdig 1912

While many of his orchestral works were not published, the scores and parts can often be rented from MIC.
