= Morten Andreas Meyer =

Norwegian politician (born 1959)

Minister of Labour and Government Administration
- In office 8 March 2004 – 17 October 2005
- Prime Minister: Kjell Magne Bondevik
- Preceded by: Victor D. Norman
- Succeeded by: Heidi Grande Røys

Personal details
- Born: 20 October 1959 (age 66) Sarpsborg, Norway
- Party: Conservative

Morten Andreas Meyer (born 20 October 1959 in Sarpsborg) is a Norwegian politician for the Conservative Party.

In 2001, when the second cabinet Bondevik held office, Meyer was appointed State Secretary in the Ministry of Local Government and Regional Development. He held this post until 2003, but became Minister of Labour and Administration in a March 2004 cabinet reshuffle. In June 2004 the job was renamed Minister of Modernisation. He lost the job when the second cabinet Bondevik fell in 2005.

On the local level Meyer was a member of Hamar municipal council from 1979 to 1983, and served as deputy mayor from 1999 to 2001. He chaired the municipal party chapter from 1997 to 1999, and was deputy leader of the county party chapter from 2000 to 2002. From 1982 to 1984 he was on the executive board of the Young Conservatives.

Meyer does not have higher education, but has a long career in the private sector, lately in corporations such as Storebrand Bank, KPMG and PricewaterhouseCoopers. In 2006 he was hired as director of the Business Consulting Services division in IBM Norway.

Meyer is married and has two daughters.

Preceded by Victor Norman	Norwegian Minister of Modernisation; 2004–2005	Succeeded by Heidi Grande Røys
