= Olav Fjell =

Norwegian businessperson

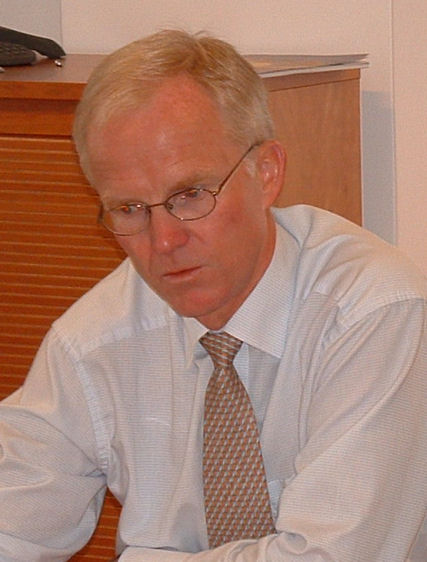
- Born: 28 June 1951 (age 75)
- Education: Norwegian School of Economics
- Title: CEO, Hurtigruten
- Board member of: Statkraft

Olav Fjell (born 28 June 1951) is a Norwegian businessperson. He was the chief executive officer (CEO) of Statoil from 1999 to 2003, and of Hurtigruten from 2007 to 2012.

== Career ==
Fjell has a siv.øk. degree from the Norwegian School of Economics in 1975 as well as education from the Royal Norwegian Army. His career started as an accountant at Kongsberg Vaabenfabrik in 1975 where he stayed until 1987, by which time he had become vice president. He had a continual employment in Bergen Bank, Den norske Bank and finally as CEO of Postbanken until he was hired as CEO of Statoil in 1999. After quitting in Statoil in 2004 he worked as a strategic and financial adviser for First Securities. He was later chief executive of Lindorff from 2006 to 2007 and Hurtigruten from 2007 to 2012.

He has also had a number of board positions, including chairman of NSB (Norwegian State Railways) from 2000 to 2003, in Eastern Drilling and Lindorff. He currently chairs of the boards of Statkraft and Deep Sea Supply.

He is a fellow of the Norwegian Academy of Technological Sciences.

== Controversy ==
As a controversial businessperson, Fjell has had a strained relationship with the press. In his last period as CFO in Kongsberg, he had massive problems internally because of the company's economic fall and felt that the press was excessive and critical. As in 2003 with the Statoil corruption case in Iran it was Dagens Næringsliv that led the critical journalism. It ended with him being decommissioned from his position with Kongsberg.

Fjell was central in the corruption scandal that Statoil experienced in 2003. After pressure both internally and from the media the board had to remove Fjell on the evening of 22 September 2003. Statoil was fined 20 million kr for corruption from the Norwegian National Authority for the Investigation and Prosecution of Economic and Environmental Crime. Despite the seriousness of the case and the weakening of the name of Statoil, Fjell was according to the media given a compensation between NOK 7.5 and 10 million. In addition he sued Statoil with demands for early pension from 60 years equal to 66% of his wage. Statoil denied this agreement, though it was mentioned in the press release at the time of Fjells departure. In December 2005 Fjell won the court case, and he can expect payments from Statoil up to about NOK 40 million.

Business positions
Preceded by Harald Norvik	Chief executive of Statoil; 1999–2003	Succeeded by Inge Hansen (acting)
Preceded by Arent M. Henriksen	Chair of NSB; 2000–2003	Succeeded by Ingeborg Moen Borgerud
Preceded by Henrik Andenæs	Chief executive of Hurtigruten; 2007–2012	Succeeded by Daniel Skjeldam
