= Leif Methlie =

Leif Birger Methlie (5 April 1939 – 17 October 2023) was a Norwegian mechanical engineer, organisational theorist, and Professor Emeritus at the Norwegian School of Economics (NHH). He was rector at NHH from 1990-1995.

== Life and career ==
Born in Bergen, Norway, Methlie was the son of Birger Ingolf and Astrid (Methlie) Olsen. He received his BSc in mechanical engineering from the University of Strathclyde in 1962, and a postgraduate degree from the Stockholm University in 1966.

In 1964 he had started his career as manager in a mining equipment company, and was research manager at a Bergen Research Institute from 1968 to 1974. In 1974 he started his academic career at the Norwegian School of Economics (NHH) as Associate professor in Management Information Systems. Here he was promoted to professor in 1976, and served as rector from 1990 to 1996.

From 1984 to 1990 Methlie chaired the International Federation Information Processing, Working Group 8.3 on Decision Support Systems, which aimed to develop "approaches for applying information systems technology to increase the effectiveness of decision-makers in situations where the computer system can support and enhance human judgements in the performance of tasks that have elements which cannot be specified in advance." Methlie died on 17 October 2023, at the age of 85.

== Publications, a selection ==
- Klein, Michel, and Leif B. Methlie. Expert systems : a decision support approach : with applications in management and finance. Addison-Wesley, 1990.
- Leif B. Methlie. Information systems design : concepts and methods : aspects of analysis and design of transaction processing systems. Universitetsforl., 1978.
- Leif B. Methlie, Ralph H. Sprague, IFIP WG 8.3. Knowledge representation for decision support systems: proceedings of the IFIP WG 8.3 Working Conference on Knowledge Representation for Decision Support Systems, Durham, U.K., 24-26 July 1984. North-Holland, 1985
- Klein, Michel, and Leif B. Methlie. Knowledge-based decision support systems with applications in business: a decision support approach. Chichester, UK: John Wiley & Sons, 1995, 2009.
- Leif B. Methlie (ed.), The New economy : drøm eller virkelighet?, SNF årbok, 2000.
- Methlie, Leif B., and Sven Arne Haugland. An analysis of the interplay among the dimensions of the business model and their effects on performance. SNF Working Paper No 35/11. (2011).

Articles, a selection:

- Methlie, Leif B., and Herbjørn Nysveen. "Loyalty of on-line bank customers." Journal of Information Technology 14.4 (1999): 375-386.
- Pedersen, Per E., Leif B. Methlie, and Helge Thorbjornsen. "Understanding mobile commerce end-user adoption: a triangulation perspective and suggestions for an exploratory service evaluation framework." System Sciences, 2002. HICSS. Proceedings of the 35th Annual Hawaii International Conference on. IEEE, 2002.
- Methlie, Leif B., and Per E. Pedersen. "Business model choices for value creation of mobile services." info 9.5 (2007): 70-85.

Academic offices
Preceded by Arne Kinserdal	Rector of the Norwegian School of Economics; 1990–1995	Succeeded by Carl Julius Norstrøm
