= Ingvar Wedervang =

Norwegian economist and statistician

Ingvar Brynhjulf Wedervang (21 July 1891 – 4 December 1961) was a Norwegian economist and statistician.

He graduated from the University of Oslo with a degree in economics in 1913. During the next nine years, he worked first as a government statistician with Statistics Norway, then for the private company Treschow-Fritzøe, and again for a government agency. In 1922 he moved to Munich and continued his studies. He returned to Statistics Norway in 1923 and received his doctorate in 1925 with a dissertation on the sex proportion at birth and infant mortality. Wedervang became lecturer at the University of Oslo in 1925 and was appointed professor of economics and statistics in June 1926.

In 1930 Wedervang was among the sixteen founding members of the Econometric Society.

As a professor Wedervang lectured on applied economics, social and economic statistics, and demography. Wedervang belonged firmly to the school of empirically oriented Norwegian economists in the tradition of Anton Martin Schweigaard. His work in the 1920s comprised an estimate of national income in Norway and some articles on trade problems. Wedervang did not publish in German or English and was therefore hardly known outside Scandinavia.

Professor Wedervang worked also actively for the establishment of the Norwegian School of Economics in Bergen and served as the school's first rector from 1936 to 31 December 1956. His tenure was only interrupted by the German occupation of Norway when he was removed from his position due to patriotic attitude, and incarcerated in a concentration camp.

In 1947 he was appointed Commander of the Order of St. Olav and Officer of the French Légion d'honneur.

Academic offices
Preceded by position created	Rector of the Norwegian School of Economics; 1936–1956	Succeeded by Eilif W. Paulson
