= Carl Julius Norstrøm =

Norwegian economist

Carl Julius Norstrøm (6 January 1936 – 15 June 2012) was a Norwegian economist who served as rector of the Norwegian School of Economics (NHH) from 1995–1998. He was a professor at NHH and a graduate of the same institution.

Academic offices
Preceded by Leif Methlie	Rector of the Norwegian School of Economics; 1995–1998	Succeeded by Victor D. Norman
