= Karl H. Borch =

Norwegian economist (1919–1986)

Karl Henrik Borch (13 March 1919 – 2 December 1986) was a Norwegian economist who was a professor at NHH in Bergen, Norway between 1963 and 1986. He is considered one of the founders of economics of uncertainty, counting 150 scientific articles in journals and conference proceedings, and three books.
