= Olav Harald Jensen =

Norwegian economist

Olav Harald Jensen (1917–1991) was a Norwegian economist.

He was educated in business administration, and was hired in 1955 as a lecturer at the Norwegian School of Economics (NHH). He was a professor at Åbo Akademi University from 1958, before returning to NHH as a professor from 1960 to 1984. He served as rector there from 1973 to 1978.

He was the brother of Arne Jensen.

Academic offices
Preceded by Dag Coward	Rector of the Norwegian School of Economics; 1973–1978	Succeeded by Gerhard Stoltz
