= Gerhard Stoltz =

Norwegian economist

Gerhard Stoltz (1923 – 1991) was a Norwegian economist.

Born in Bergen, he took the dr.philos. degree in 1959 with the thesis Arbeidstidsproblemer. He was hired in 1962 as a professor at the Norwegian School of Economics, and served as rector there from 1979 to 1984.

Academic offices
Preceded by Olav Harald Jensen	Rector of the Norwegian School of Economics; 1979–1984	Succeeded by Arne Kinserdal
