= Heidi Grande Røys =

Norwegian politician (born 1967)

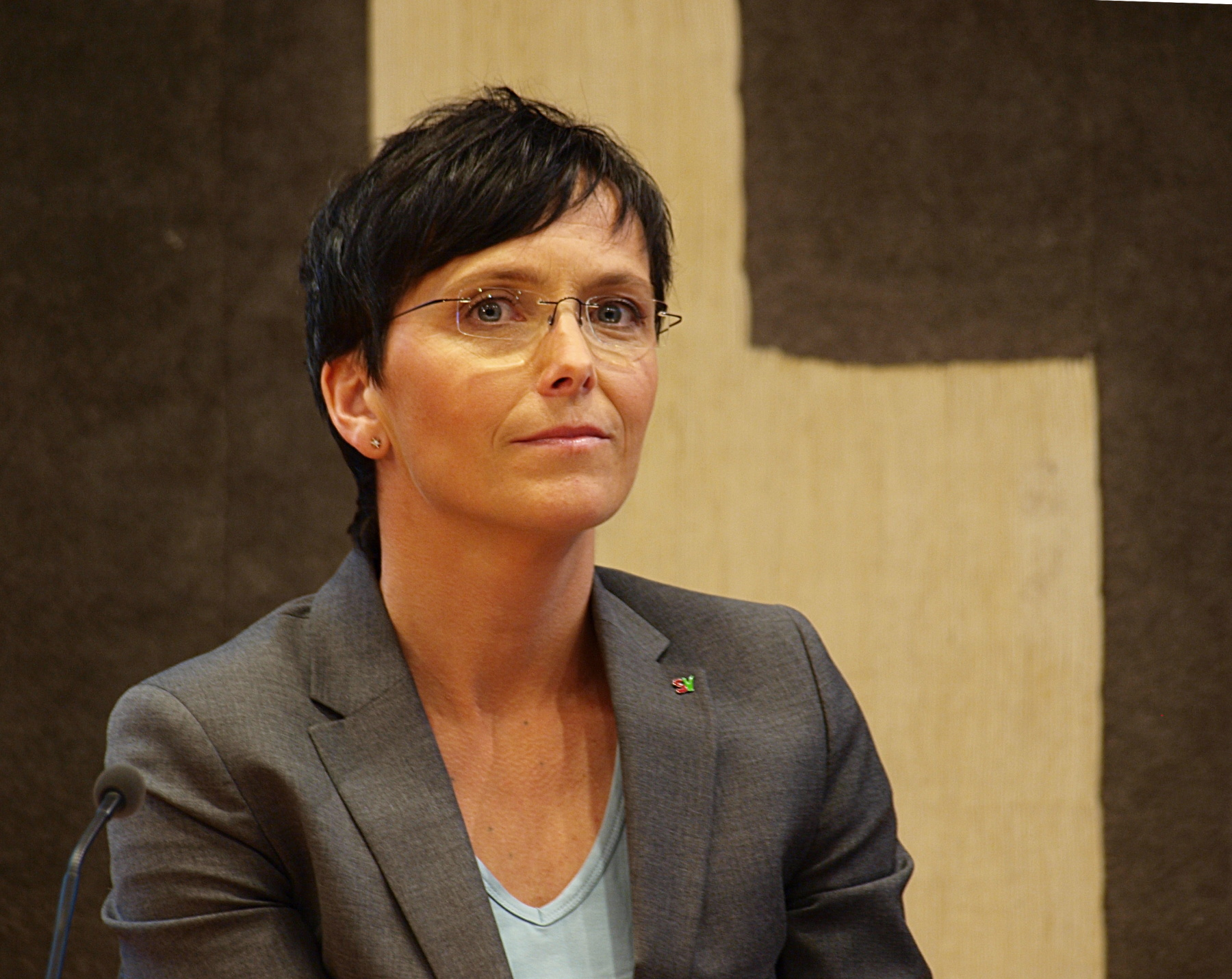
- Røys in 2009

Minister of Government Administration and Reform
- In office 17 October 2005 – 20 October 2009
- Prime Minister: Jens Stoltenberg
- Preceded by: Morten Meyer
- Succeeded by: Rigmor Aasrud

Minister of Nordic Cooperation
- In office 17 October 2005 – 20 October 2009
- Prime Minister: Jens Stoltenberg
- Preceded by: Svein Ludvigsen
- Succeeded by: Rigmor Aasrud

Member of the Norwegian Parliament
- In office 1 October 2001 – 30 September 2005
- Constituency: Sogn og Fjordane

Personal details
- Born: 6 May 1967 (age 58) Kalvåg, Sogn og Fjordane, Norway
- Party: Socialist Left

Heidi Grande Røys (born 6 May 1967) is a Norwegian politician for the Socialist Left Party. She became Minister of Modernisation in 2005, renamed to Minister of Government Administration and Reform since 2006 in the second cabinet Stoltenberg. She was replaced by Rigmor Aasrud in 2009.
