= Svein Støle =

Norwegian businessperson and broker (born 1963)

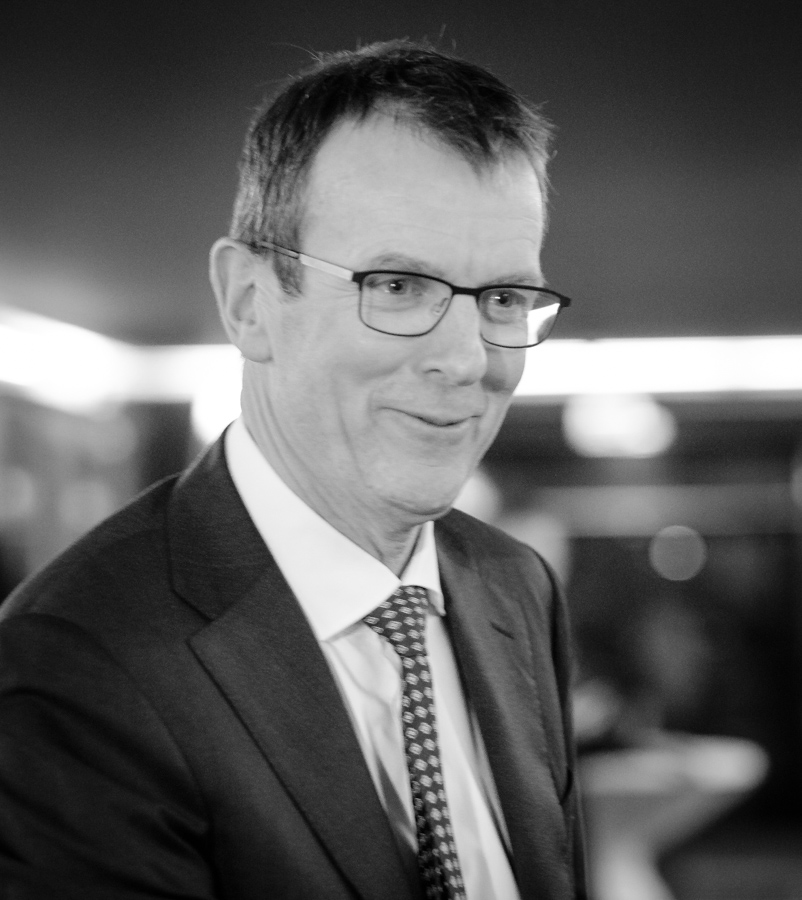
Svein Støle

Svein Støle (born April 5, 1963) is a Norwegian businessperson and broker. After growing up in Mandal, he was educated in law and business administration. He worked for a period as a journalist for Kapital before in 1992 buying a large portion of Pareto Group, where he now holds a 100% ownership. His fortune in 2009 was estimated at NOK 5.5 billion (approximately 900 million USD). In 2018 his fortune is believed to have grown to NOK 10 billion, and Støle is relocating to Switzerland.

He was educated at the Norwegian School of Economics; he graduated in 1983.
