= Dag Coward =

Norwegian economist (1910–2000)

- Born: March 18, 1910; Kristiansand, Norway
- Died: May 20, 2000 (aged 90); Oslo, Norway
- Education: University of Oslo
- Occupations: Economist, professor

Dag Coward (1910–2000) was a Norwegian economist who served as the fourth rector of the Norwegian School of Economics (NHH) from 1964–1972.

Born in Kristiansand he studied at the University of Oslo, where he took the economics exam in 1931.

He was appointed Knight of the Order of St. Olav.

Academic offices
Preceded by Rolf Waaler	Rector of the Norwegian School of Economics; 1964-1972	Succeeded by Olav Harald Jensen
