= Arne Jensen (banker) =

Norwegian banker

Arne Jensen (7 March 1914 – 9 February 2002) was a Norwegian banker.

Born 7 March 1914 in Kristiania, and brother of Olav Harald Jensen, he received his cand.jur. degree. He was director of the Norwegian Savings Banks Association from 1942 to 1960, the savings bank Akers Sparebank from 1960 to 1970, and Oslo Sparebank from 1970 to 1979 (since 1978 named Sparebanken Oslo/Akershus). He was the chair of the Norwegian Savings Banks Association from 1964 to 1967.
