= Tom Colbjørnsen =

Norwegian economist and sociologist

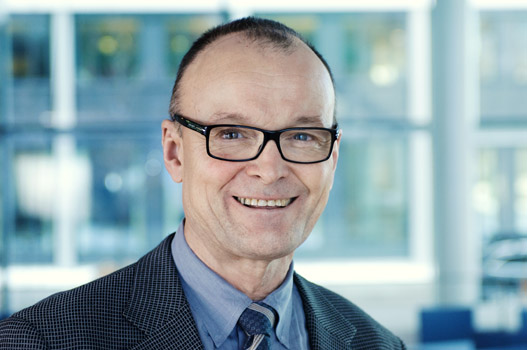

Tom Colbjørnsen (born 31 May 1951 in Oslo) is a Norwegian economist and sociologist, and was the President of the BI Norwegian Business School from 2006 to 2014.

Colbjørnsen graduated from the Norwegian School of Economics (NHH) with a siv.øk. degree in 1976 and received his dr.philos. degree from the University of Bergen in 1984. He was a professor at NHH when he in 2006 was appointed as the new President at BI Norwegian Business School.

== Publications ==
Colbjørnsen has been the author and editor of a large number of academic books and articles. Books, a selection:

- Colbjørnsen, Tom. Dividers in the labor market. Norwegian University Press, 1986.
- Gustavsen, Björn, Tom Colbjørnsen, and Øyvind Pålshaugen, eds. Development coalitions in working life: the ‘Enterprise Development 2000’Program in Norway. Vol. 6. John Benjamins Publishing, 1998.

Articles, a selection:

- Colbjørnsen, Tom, and Arne L. Kalleberg. "Spillover, standardization and stratification: earnings determination in the United States and Norway." European Sociological Review 4.1 (1988): 20–31.
- Colbjørnsen, Tom, and Eivind Falkum. "Corporate efficiency and employee participation." Development Coalitions in Working Life: the ‘Enterprise Development 2000’Program in Norway (1998): 34–5.
