= Tarjei Rygnestad =

Tarjei Rygnestad (26 July 1954 – 2 February 2013) was a Norwegian physician.

He was a professor of medicine at the Norwegian University of Science and Technology and a physician at St. Olav Hospital. He had specialization in anesthesiology and clinical pharmacology. He chaired the Norwegian Board of Forensic Medicine from 2009 to his death from heart failure in February 2013.

Civic offices
Preceded by Randi Rosenqvist	Leader of the Norwegian Board of Forensic Medicine; 2009–2013	Succeeded by Karl Heinrik Melle
