= Lillehammer Olympic Organizing Committee =

The Lillehammer Olympic Organizing Committee or LOOC was the company responsible for organizing the 1994 Winter Olympics in Lillehammer, Norway. The company was founded on 15 November 1988, after Lillehammer's successful bid to host the games, and led by Gerhard Heiberg. It was reorganized several times with various subsidiaries, but from 1993 consisted of a single company owned 51% by Lillehammer Municipality, 24.5% by the Government of Norway and 24.5% by the Norwegian Olympic Committee.

Chief executive Henrik Andenæs and vice chief executive Petter Rønningen were both decorated as Knights, First Class of the Order of St. Olav for their efforts in LOOC; Heiberg was decorated as Commander.
