= Eilif W. Paulson =

Norwegian economist

Eilif Wolff Paulson (25 November 1892 – 11 December 1980) was a Norwegian economist who served as the second rector of the Norwegian School of Economics (NHH) from 1956–1957.

He was educated from the Norwegian Institute of Technology in Trondheim and was appointed Knight of the Order of St. Olav in 1958.

Academic offices
Preceded by Ingvar Wedervang	Rector of the Norwegian School of Economics; 1956–1957	Succeeded by Rolf Waaler
