= Erling Øverland =

Norwegian businessperson (born 1952)

Erling Øverland (born 31 May 1952) is a Norwegian businessperson.

Øverland joined Statoil in 1976, was head of refining and marketing from 2000, and became acting chief executive in 2004. He was president of the Confederation of Norwegian Enterprise from 2004 to 2008. In 2008 he was succeeded by Paul-Christian Rieber. He has also been a board chairman of PCI Biotech and board member of Norges Varemesse and SR-bank. In early 2009 he became acting CFO of SR-Bank.

Business positions
Preceded by Inge Hansen (acting)	Chief executive of Statoil; March 2004–August 2004 (acting)	Succeeded by Helge Lund
Preceded by Jens Ulltveit-Moe	President of the Confederation of Norwegian Enterprise; 2004–2008	Succeeded by Paul-Christian Rieber
