= Martin Skancke =

Martin Skancke (born 1966) is a Norwegian sovereign wealth fund and asset-management expert and former civil servant.

== Early life and education ==
Skancke graduated as siviløkonom from the Norwegian School of Economics (NHH) and earned his master's degree at the London School of Economics. He served his military service at the elite Russian language program of the Norwegian Armed Forces, which, in addition to extensive Russian language training, included courses in intelligence and international security.

== Career ==
Skancke started his career as a consultant and deputy secretary in the Norwegian Ministry of Finance in 1990. From 2001 to 2002 he left the government administration to work as an advisor in McKinsey, but he returned as Director General in the Office of the Prime Minister. In 2006 he was appointed Director General in the Ministry of Finance Asset Management Department, which acts as the owners and decides the investment strategies of the Government Pension Fund - Global and the Government Pension Fund - Norway, which together comprise The Government Pension Fund of Norway.

According to news media in August 2011, Skancke, who had "long [been] known as the brains behind much of the success of Norway’s so-called 'oil fund,' [had] resigned from his top post in the Finance Ministry to start advising other countries that are building up their own funds. He [would] also help guide investing by Norwegian insurance firm Storebrand."

== Notes ==
- Hellstrøm, Ulf Peter (29 May 2008). "Oljefondets ansikt i utlandet". Aftenposten (in Norwegian).
