= Arne Kinserdal =

Norwegian economist

Arne Kinserdal (born 17 February 1934) is a Norwegian economist and Professor Emeritus at the Norwegian School of Economics (NHH).

He served as rector of Norwegian School of Economics from 1985–1990.

Academic offices
Preceded by Gerhard Stoltz	Rector of the Norwegian School of Economics; 1985-1990	Succeeded by Leif Methlie
