= Inge Hansen =

Norwegian handball player (born 1946)

Inge Ketil Hansen (born 21 April 1946) is a retired Norwegian handball player who competed in the 1972 Summer Olympics.

He was born in Asker and represented the club Fredensborg/Ski HK. In 1972 he was part of the Norwegian team which finished ninth in the Olympic tournament. He played four matches and scored eleven goals. In total he was capped 116 times between 1965 and 1975. He won the league with both Fredensborg and Bergen-Studentenes IL.

After his active handball career he became a businessman. He holds a siv.øk. degree from the Norwegian School of Economics. He was director of Bergen Bank and Den norske Bank before becoming CEO of Orkla Finans from 1994 to 2000. He became CFO of Statoil in 2000, and after a period as acting CEO from 2003 to 2004 he went to Aker Kværner to become CEO in 2004. He was also chairman of Avinor. On 3 March 2006, it was announced that Hansen would be succeeded by Martinus Brandal as president and CEO of Aker Kværner 1 July 2006. Hansen is currently also chairman of the insurance company Gjensidige.

Business positions
Preceded by Olav Fjell	Chief executive of Statoil; 2003–2004 (acting)	Succeeded by Erling Øverland (acting)
