= Per Ivar Gjærum =

Norwegian economist

- Born: 10 August 1948 (age 78)
- Citizenship: Norwegian
- Scientific career
- Workplaces: Norwegian School of Economics

Per Ivar Gjærum (born 10 August 1948) a Norwegian organizational theorist, and Emeritus Associate Professor of Finance and Management Science at the Norwegian School of Economics (NHH). His specialty fields involve investment and project analysis.

Gjærum has also been visiting professor at London Business School. He served as rector of NHH from October 2001 to August 2005. His predecessor was Victor D. Norman and he was succeeded by Jan Haaland.

Academic offices
Preceded by Victor D. Norman	Rector of the Norwegian School of Economics; 2001–2005	Succeeded by Jan I. Haaland
