= Fredrik Halvorsen =

Norwegian businessperson

- Born: December 1973 (age 52); Oslo, Norway
- Education: Norwegian School of Economics, Kellogg School of Management
- Title: Director, Ubon Partners

Fredrik Halvorsen is a [Norwegian businessperson. He is a director at Ubon Partners.

He holds an undergraduate degree from the Norwegian School of Economics, and a graduate degree from the Kellogg School of Management.

== Professional career ==
Halvorsen has held a number of positions during his career, including CEO of Seadrill, CEO of Tandberg and senior positions in Cisco and McKinsey & Company. He was chairman of Acano until its acquisition by Cisco in 2016.

He has been dubbed as John Fredriksen's wonderboy in Norwegian media.
