= Victor D. Norman =

Norwegian economist and politician (1946–2024)

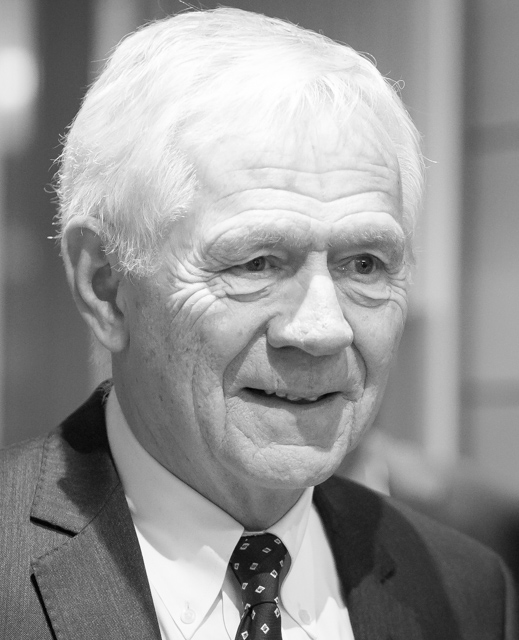
- Norman in 2017

Minister of Labour and Government Administration
- In office 19 October 2001 – 8 March 2004
- Prime Minister: Kjell Magne Bondevik
- Preceded by: Jørgen Kosmo
- Succeeded by: Morten Meyer

Personal details
- Born: 24 July 1946 Risør, Norway
- Died: 20 September 2024 (aged 78)
- Party: Conservative
- Spouse: Christine B. Meyer (m. 2005)
- Education: Massachusetts Institute of Technology
- Scientific career
- Workplaces: Norwegian School of Economics (NHH)

Victor Danielsen Norman (24 July 1946 – 20 September 2024) was a Norwegian economist, politician for the Conservative Party and newspaper columnist. He was a professor of economics at the Norwegian School of Economics (NHH) and sst chairman of the Institute for Research in Economics and Business Administration.

== Early life and academia ==
Victor Norman was born on 24 July 1946. He earned his bachelor's degree from Yale University and his PhD from Massachusetts Institute of Technology in 1972. Among his academic advisers were Charles P. Kindleberger, Paul A. Samuelson and Jagdish N. Bhagwati.

His book co-authored with Avinash K. Dixit, Theory of International Trade: A Dual, General Equilibrium Approach, ISBN 0-521-29969-1, is an application of the microeconomic principle of duality to trade theory, which William J. Baumol has called a clear, detailed, important contribution to the academic understanding of international trade. He was appointed professor of economics at NHH in 1975.

Victor Norman served as rector at NHH from August 1999 till October 2001. He was preceded in this position by Carl Julius Norstrøm and succeeded by Per Ivar Gjærum. He is a member of the Norwegian Academy of Science and Letters.

== Politics ==
From 19 October 2001 to 8 March 2004 he served as minister of labour and government administration in Bondevik's second cabinet. Among the issues he passed in his term was the removal of point accrual on frequent flyer programs for domestic flights and the relocation of several government agencies from Oslo to other cities and towns across Norway. His term also witnessed a scandal, called the Norman scandal, which caused him to leave office in 2004. He was accused of various wrongdoing such as having an affair with a secretary of state at the ministry and using public funds for personal use. Despite media attacks he was backed by Prime Minister Kjell Magne Bondevik, but he could deal with these attacks until 2004 when he returned to his teaching position.

== Death ==
Norman died on 20 September 2024, at the age of 78.

Academic offices
Preceded by Carl Julius Norstrøm	Rector of the Norwegian School of Economics; 1999–2001	Succeeded by Per Ivar Gjærum
Political offices
Preceded by Jørgen Kosmo	Minister of Labour and Government Administration; 2001–2004	Succeeded by Morten Meyer
