= Jan Haaland =

Norwegian economist

Jan Ingvald Meidell Haaland
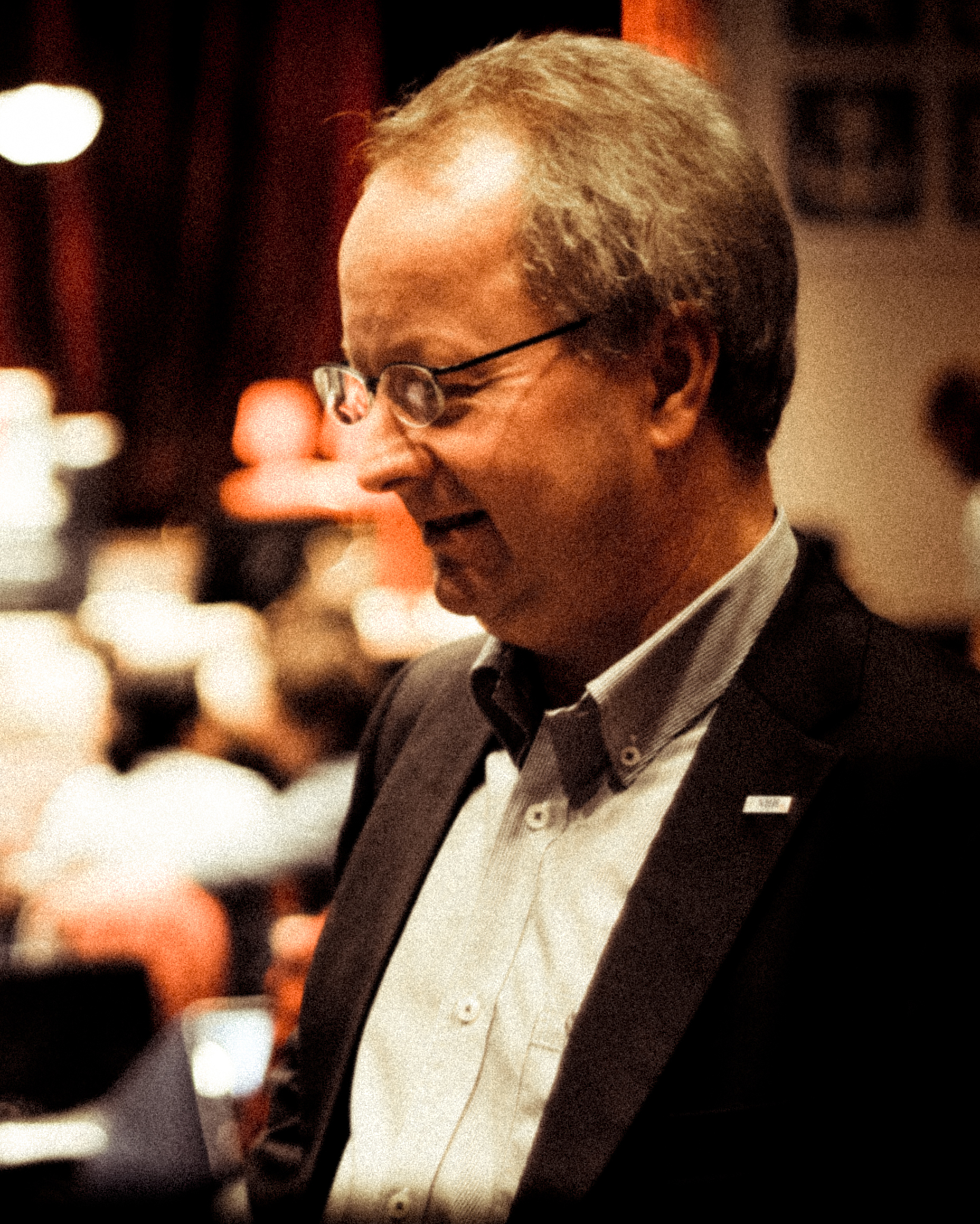
- Haaland in 2011
- Born: 18 February 1956 (age 70)
- Education: Norwegian School of Economics
- Scientific career
- Fields: Economics
- Workplaces: Norwegian School of Economics

Jan Ingvald Meidell Haaland (born 18 February 1956) was the rector of the Norwegian School of Economics (NHH). He succeeded Per Ivar Gjærum in August 2005. Haaland is also professor of economics. His research has mainly focused on questions related to international trade.

After growing up in Stavanger, Haaland was an educated siv.øk. from NHH in 1979 and continued on to receive a Doctor of Philosophy from the same institution in 1984. In addition to working at NHH he has worked at the Organisation for Economic Co-operation and Development, the University of Cambridge and the University of Southampton.

Most of his research is regarding international economics and trade, international politics, economic integration and multinational corporations. He is also an associate of the Centre for Economic Policy Research in London. Between 1999 and 2001 he was Dean of the Department of Economics and between 2001 and 2005 he was a member of the board of NHH.

Academic offices
Preceded by Per Ivar Gjærum	Rector of the Norwegian School of Economics; 2005–present	Incumbent
