= Norwegian Board of Forensic Medicine =

The Norwegian Board of Forensic Medicine (Norwegian: Den rettsmedisinske kommisjon, DRK) is a board appointed by the Ministry of Justice, mainly for assessing expert witness opinions submitted in criminal cases by forensic psychiatrists, pathologists, toxicologists, geneticists and clinical medical practitioners. The board has its authority in the Criminal Procedures Act, section 146.

The Board of Forensic Medicine only gives statements where issues are raised. It is at liberty to request further investigations and, in rare cases, request that new forensic experts be appointed. The board is also a hearing body in certain cases and act as advisory and arrange courses for forensic experts.

It is chaired by Karl Heinrik Melle, who took over in 2013 following Tarjei Rygnestad's death.
