= Paul-Christian Rieber =

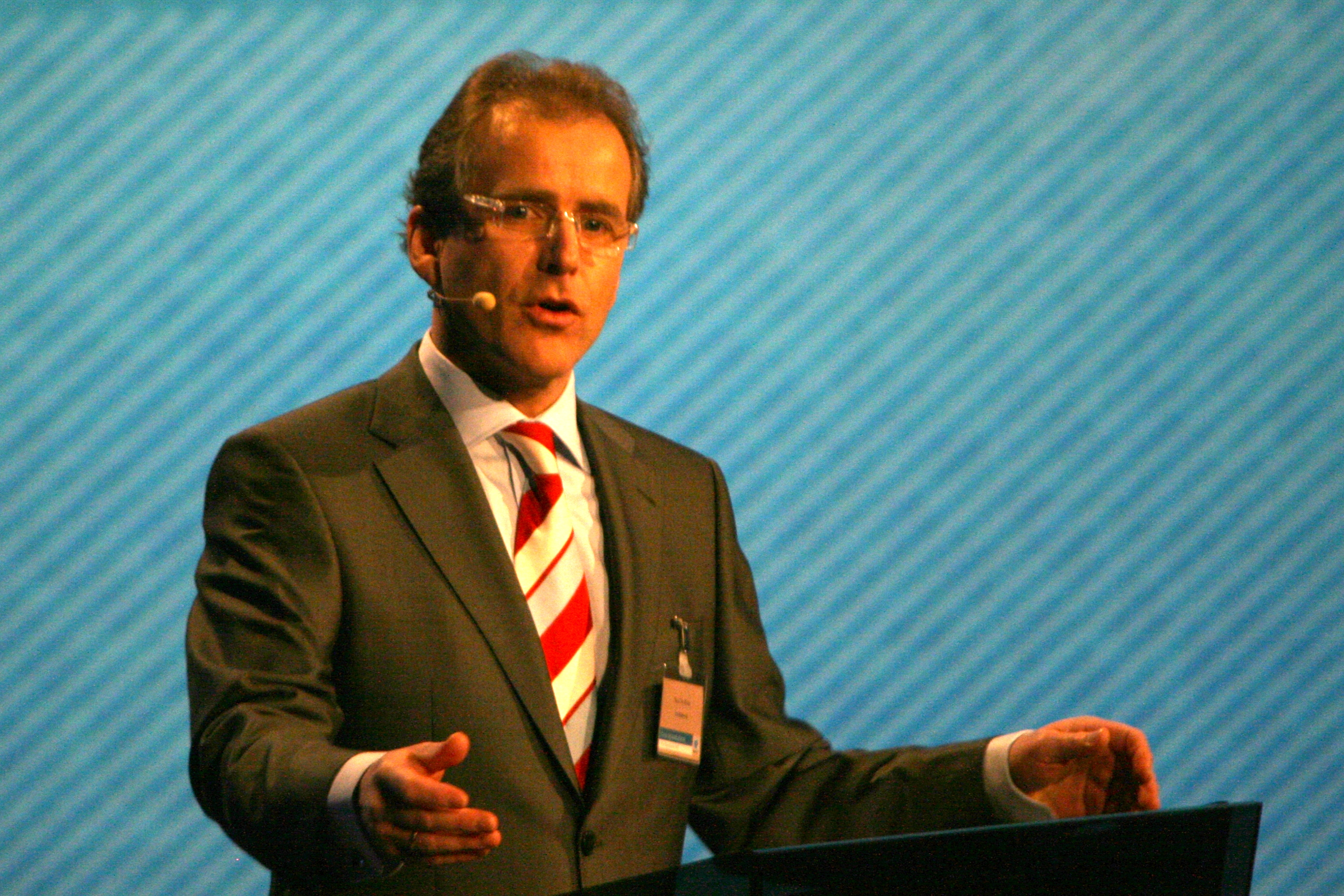
Paul-Christian Rieber (2009)

Paul-Christian Rieber (born 30 March 1958) is a Norwegian businessperson and former president of the Confederation of Norwegian Enterprise (NHO). He lives in Bergen, Norway.

Rieber has, since 1990, led the billion-dollar company GC Rieber, a family-owned company with over 100 family members as shareholders. GC Rieber operates in various industries, including shipping, marine oils, salt, skins and property. He has been an elected representative in the Confederation of Norwegian Enterprise for many years. He was the leader of its Forum for family businesses and active owners, until elected as president of the Confederation of Norwegian Enterprise on 10 June 2008. On 24 April 2010, Rieber withdrew as president of NHO, following a scandal in which a company he held the chairmanship of had evaded paying several hundred million Norwegian krone in customs on fish oil imports from Morocco.

He holds a degree from the Norwegian School of Economics.

Business positions
Preceded by Erling Øverland	President of the Confederation of Norwegian Enterprise; 2008–2010	Succeeded by Kristin Skogen Lund
