= Lindorff =

Lindorff is a surname. Notable people with the surname include:

- Dave Lindorff (born 1949), American investigative reporter and filmmaker
- Henny Lindorff Buckhøj (1902–1979), Danish film actress
- Linda Lindorff (born 1972), Swedish television presenter
