= Yngve Slyngstad =

Chief Executive Officer of Aker Asset Management

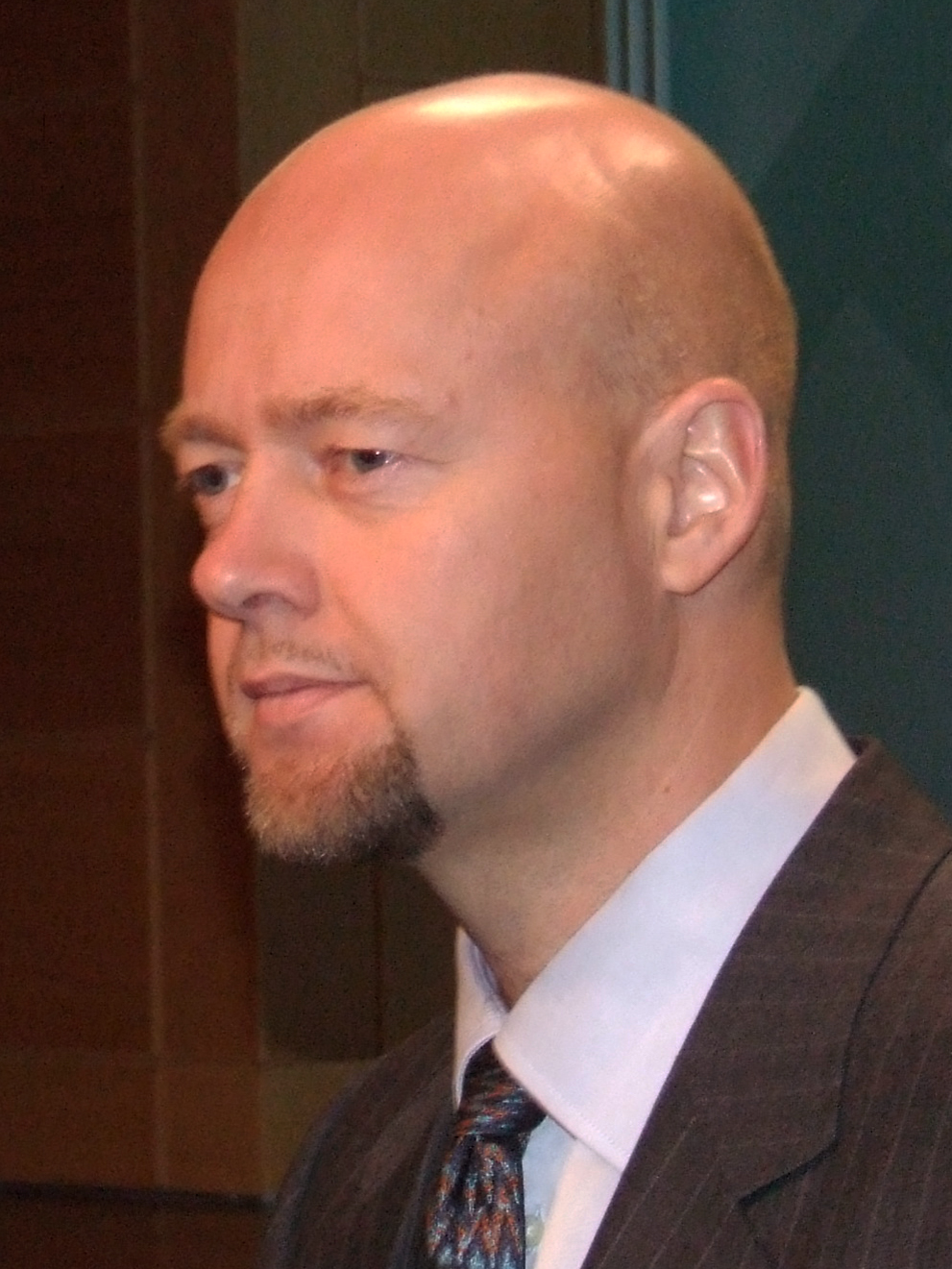
- Born: 3 November 1962 (age 63)
- Education: University of Oslo; Norwegian School of Economics; UC Santa Barbara; University of Paris
- Occupations: Former CEO, Norges Bank Investment Management

Yngve Slyngstad (Norwegian pronunciation: [ˈʏ̂ŋvə ˈʂlʏ̀ŋstɑ]; born 3 November 1962) was the former CEO of Norges Bank Investment Management (NBIM) which is the part of the Norwegian Central Bank that is responsible for managing The Government Pension Fund - Global. In 2021 he was appointed as the CEO and senior partner of Aker Asset Management (AAM).

Slyngstad has a law degree from the University of Oslo and a degree from the Norwegian School of Economics. He also holds an MA degree in economics from the University of California, Santa Barbara and an MA degree in political science from the University of Paris.

Slyngstad was listed 5th on aiCIO's 2012 list of the 100 most influential institutional investors worldwide. In July 2013, he was ranked 3rd on the Sovereign Wealth Fund Institute's Public Investor 100. In 2013 and 2014, Slyngstad was on the Forbes list of The World's Most Powerful People as #70 and #72, respectively.
