= Pareto Group =

Norwegian finance company

Pareto AS
- Type: Private
- Industry: Financial services
- Founded: 1986
- Headquarters: Oslo, Norway
- Area served: Global
- Revenue: ▲NOK 3,276 million (2006)
- Operating income: NOK 2,324 million (2006)
- Net income: NOK 1,098 million (2006)
- Number of employees: 283 (2007)
- Website: www.paretogroup.no

Pareto Group is a Norwegian holding company that owns several financial brokers, including 65.5% of Pareto Securities and the shipbroker Bassøe. In 2008 Pareto started its own bank, Pareto Bank. In 2006 it had 5.1% of the trade on the Oslo Stock Exchange. The company is owned by Svein Støle (100%).

== History ==
The company was founded in 1986 by Oslobanken, and bought by Svein Støle and some other investors in 1992 for about NOK 50 million. During Støles management the company has developed itself to be one of the most important broker houses for the offshore industry. Pareto Securities' Corporate Finance team is number one in the Norwegian market for IPOs, measured both by number of deals and by value of the deals. In addition, the firm is distinguished in both equity and high-yield trading.
