= Ludvig Mathias Lindeman =

Norwegian composer and organist

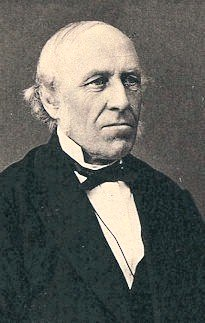
- Ludvig Mathias Lindeman
- Born: 28 November 1812; Trondheim, Denmark-Norway
- Died: 23 May 1887 (aged 74); Oslo, Sweden-Norway
- Occupations: Composer; organist
- Spouse: Aminda Magnhilde Brynie (m. 1848)

Ludvig Mathias Lindeman (28 November 1812 – 23 May 1887) was a Norwegian composer and organist. He is noted for collecting and publishing Norwegian folk melodies, including in Ældre og nyere norske Fjeldmelodier.

== Biography ==
Ludvig Mathias Lindeman was born on 28 November 1812 in Trondheim, the seventh of ten children born to Ole Andreas Lindeman and Anna Severine Hickmann. After his older brother Jacob became a priest, Lindeman succeeded him as the cantor and organist of the Oslo Cathedral, a position he held until his death. He married Aminda Magnhilde Brynie in 1848.

In 1841, Lindeman published a selection of Norwegian folk melodies, Norske Fjeldmelodier harmonisk bearbeidede for Pianoforte (1841). He received university funding to travel and collect folk melodies, some of which were published in Ældre og nyere norske Fjeldmelodier. He also published Melodier til Landstads Salmebog.

Lindeman was appointed Knight of the Royal Norwegian Order of St. Olav in 1870. When a new organ in the Royal Albert Hall in London was inaugurated in 1871, Lindeman was among those invited to perform. In 1883, together with his son Peter, he started an organist school in Oslo. He died in Oslo on 23 May 1887 and was buried at Oslo Cathedral. A bust of Lindeman was later erected outside the church.

== Other sources ==
- Gaukstad, Øystein L. M. Lindemans komposisjoner (1962)
- Gaukstad, Øystein Ludvig Mathias Lindemans samling av norske folkeviser og religiøse folketoner (Novus forlag. Oslo: 1997) ISBN 82-7099-273-9
