= Helge Lund =

Norwegian businessman (born 1962)

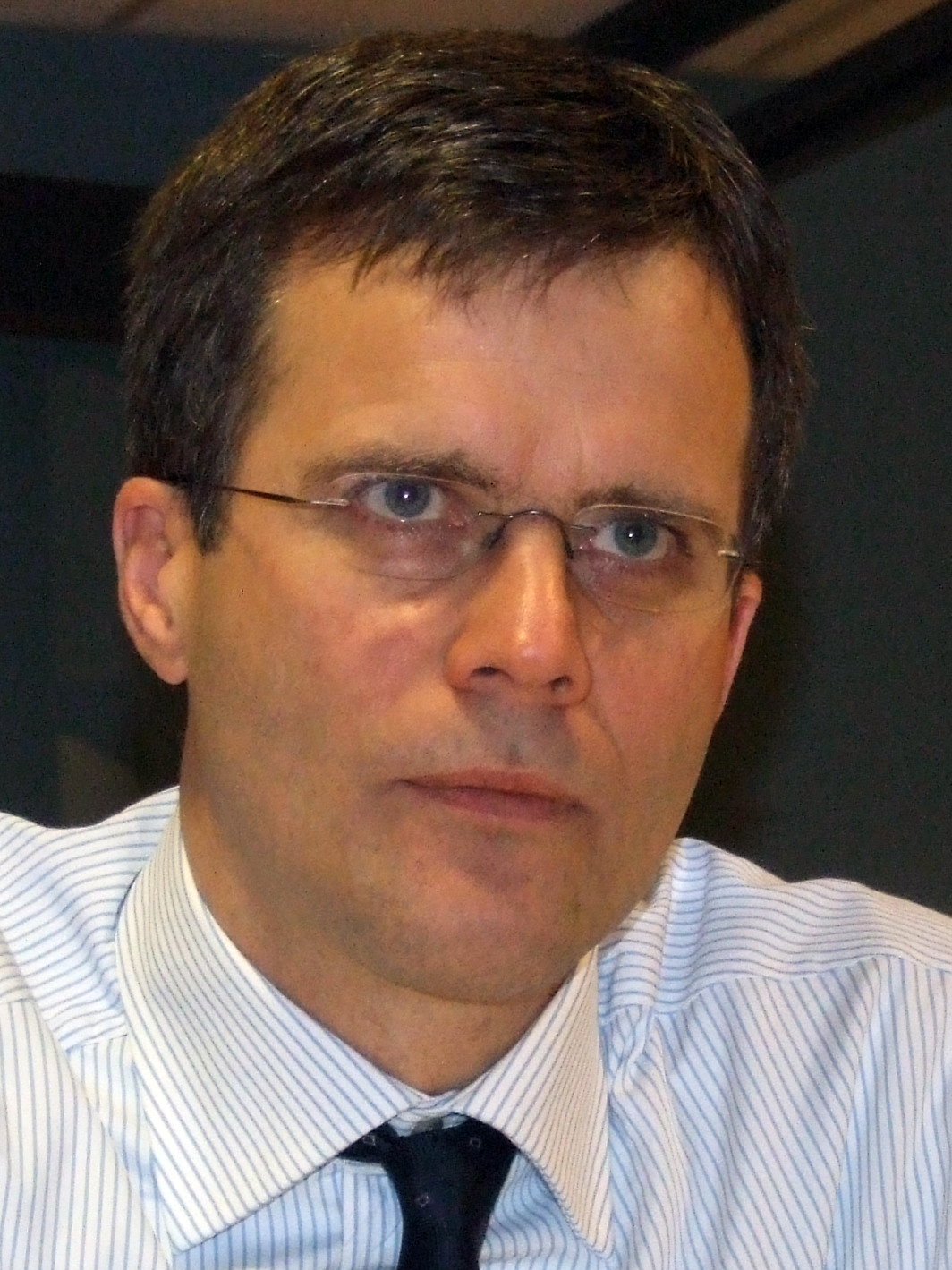
- Born: 16 October 1962 (age 64); Oslo, Norway
- Education: Norwegian School of Economics (MA); INSEAD (MBA)
- Occupation: Businessman
- Spouse: Else-Cathrine Lund
- Children: 2

13th chairman of BP
- In office 2019–2025
- Preceded by: Carl-Henric Svanberg
- Succeeded by: Albert Manifold

Helge Lund (born 16 October 1962) is a Norwegian businessman who was the chairman of the British oil and gas company BP from 2019 to 2025 and the chairman of the Danish pharmaceutical company Novo from 2018 to 2025. He is the former chief executive of BG Group, Statoil and Aker Kværner, and was a director of Schlumberger from 2016 to 2018.

== Early life ==
Lund was born in Oslo, Norway, in 1962. He graduated with a Master of Arts in business management at the Norwegian School of Economics in Bergen in 1987. He has a Master of Business Administration (MBA) from the INSEAD business school in France.

== Career ==
He started his career as a management consultant for McKinsey & Company and as political adviser for the Conservative Party in the Norwegian parliament Stortinget, before starting work for Hafslund Nycomed in 1993. In 1997-1998 he was vice president in Nycomed Pharma before starting work in Aker RGI in 1999 as vice president before becoming CEO for Aker Kværner in 2002. After Olav Fjell withdrew as CEO of Statoil in 2004, Lund took over and was retained after Statoil merged with the oil & gas division of Norsk Hydro in 2007 to create StatoilHydro.

On 15 October 2014, Lund resigned as CEO for Statoil with immediate effect, to join the management team of the UK's BG Group as CEO from 9 February 2015.

On 1 December 2014, in response to pressure from shareholders, BG Group reduced a £12 million share award golden hello for Lund to between £4.7 million to £10.6 million, depending on the company's future performance. His basic salary would be £1.5 million, but with bonuses, total compensation could reach £14 million per annum.

Following the takeover of BG Group by Royal Dutch Shell, Lund was out of a job, but did receive a total of £5.5 million for his 11 months work, and £9.7 million in shares in February 2016, as a result of the takeover.

In June 2016, Lund was appointed to the board of directors of Schlumberger. On 26 April 2018, it was announced by BP that he would join their board on the 1 September 2018 and succeed Carl-Henric Svanberg as chairman with effect from 1 January 2019.

Some analysts and share holders have become critical of Helge Lund's oversight. Many believe that the board's mismanagement of Looney's appointment and its failure to anticipate challenges to its net-zero strategy have damaged BP's credibility.

In September 2023, Lund participated in a celebration in Azerbaijan related to the centenary of the birth of Heydar Aliyev, a former KGB officer who established an authoritarian regime in Azerbaijan after its independence from the Soviet Union. A press release from BP said that Lund was there to "pay tribute" to Aliyev's "exceptional contributions to the development of Azerbaijan and the entire region." BP is the largest foreign investor in Azerbaijan.

== Personal life ==
He is married to Else-Cathrine Lund. They have a daughter and a son.
