= Rolf Waaler =

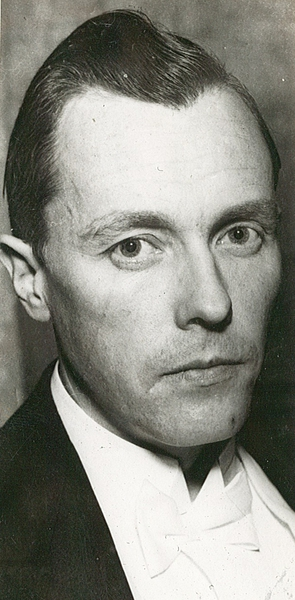
Rolf Waaler, c. 1935

Rolf Waaler (15 February 1898 – 10 July 2000) was a Norwegian organizational psychologist. He served as the third rector of the Norwegian School of Economics (NHH) from 1958-1963. His mother was composer Fredrikke Waaler.

He was educated at the Norwegian Institute of Technology and was Commander of the Order of St. Olav.

Academic offices
Preceded by Eilif W. Paulson	Rector of the Norwegian School of Economics; 1958–1962	Succeeded by Dag Coward
