= BI Norwegian Business School =

Business school in Norway

- Handelshøyskolen BI
- Motto: Make it your business
- Type: Private business school
- Established: 1943; 83 years ago
- Accreditation: Accredited as a specialised university institution (vitenskapelig høgskole)
- President: Karen Spens
- Academic staff: 497
- Administrative staff: 504
- Students: 21,620 (2024)
- Location: Nydalen, Oslo, Stavanger, Bergen, Trondheim, Norway; 59°56′55.37″N 10°46′5.21″E
- Website: www.bi.no/en/

BI Norwegian Business School (Norwegian: Handelshøyskolen BI, BI was originally Bedriftsøkonomisk Institutt) is a Norwegian private business school. BI is organized as a self-owned foundation whose sole purpose is teaching and research. As of 2024, with over 21,000 students, BI is the largest business school and the fourth-largest university in Norway. BI's main campus is located in Nydalen, Oslo, with regional campuses in Bergen, Stavanger, and Trondheim.

For several years, BI has been ranked as Norway's top business school by the Financial Times European Business School Ranking. BI also participates in several of Financial Times' sub-rankings, including Executive MBA, Executive Education, and Master's in Management.

== History ==
BI Norwegian Business School was founded by Finn Øien on 1 June 1943, as a private evening school in "trade and office subjects". Together with his partner, Jens Rosef, Finn Øien was responsible for administration, teaching, and journals, while Rosef was in charge of the accounting and auditing consultancy department. The following year, Nils Skott joined as a third owner, with responsibility for the rationalization department.

1943 – 1979

The first course in business administration at BI was conducted in the evenings and lasted for three months. From 1946, the school established a full-time economics study program that lasted for two years. BI developed as a provider of short, independent courses in accounting, industrial bookkeeping, machine bookkeeping, and corporate statistics.

In 1968, BI was reorganized from a privately owned corporation to a self-owned foundation. In 1969, the Norwegian Parliament decided to provide state funding to BI.

In the 1960s and early 1970s, the entire higher education system in Norway was undergoing several changes. There was a significant increase in the number of students, and several regional colleges were established. In the 1960s and 1970s, BI established a regional network of local schools offering studies in business administration.

1980 – 2000

In the 1980s, there was a high demand for economic administrative education in Norway. BI experienced a significant increase in students, and its revenue grew tenfold. In 1986, over 12,000 applied to study business administration at BI.

During the 1980s, the management at BI set the goal to develop BI as a specialized university. Academicization and increased efficiency were key aspects, and in 1983, BI hired its first professors. Research activity was also strengthened during this period.

In 1985, BI decided to establish a national network of local branches. Former partner schools were either being closed down or incorporated into BI's organization. That same year, BI obtained the right to award the title of Master of Science in business (Siviløkonom), which was crucial for BI's recognition as a business school.

In the 1990s, the ambition was to make BI a leading business school in Europe. In 1993, BI established its doctoral program in collaboration with the University of Oslo and Copenhagen Business School. Later on, BI also established educational programs in Shanghai, China, and in 2000, it did the same in Lithuania.

2001 – now

BI Logo (2002–2019)

In 2005, BI's campuses in Sandvika, Schous plass, and Ekeberg were consolidated into a new campus in Nydalen, Oslo.

At the same time, it was decided to focus BI's studies around business and economics, marketing, strategy, management, and administration. The number of campuses decreased from twelve to three. The number of bachelor's programs was also reduced from 19 to 13, and the number of Master of Science programs from 8 to 5.

In 2014, BI became the first business school in Norway to achieve the three most prestigious international accreditations, EQUIS, AACSB, and AMBA. With this, BI joined the one percent of business schools worldwide that can be referred to as a "Triple Crown accreditation" school.

In 2022, BI appointed Finnish Karen Spens as the new president. With this, she became BI's first female and international rector.

== Accreditations ==
- European Quality Improvement Systems (EQUIS)
- The Association to Advance Collegiate Schools of Business (AACSB)
- The Association of MBAs (AMBA)

Schools that hold these three accreditations are referred to as "Triple Crown" schools.

=== Other accreditations ===
- Accreditation as a specialized university by the Norwegian Agency for Quality Assurance in Education (NOKUT).
- Online Course Certification System (EOCCS).

== Study programmes ==
BI Norwegian Business School offers education at all levels, including bachelor's degree, master's degree, doctoral degree, and postgraduate education. The education covers areas such as economics, finance, management, marketing, communication, HR, real estate, law, data, and digital business. BI also offers an MBA program in collaboration with Fudan University School of Management, China.

=== Student Association ===
BISO, BI Student Organization, is the student association for all students at BI. BISO develops student politics and works on important student issues. They represent the students in various collaborative forums with BI and organize welfare measures and events such as company presentations, social gatherings, and the Fadderullan (orientation program) at the beginning of the academic year.

BISO has multiple subject associations, as well as various interest groups. In addition, BISO is a co-owner of StudConsult, a consulting company operated by students affiliated with BI Norwegian Business School.

== Departments and Research Centers ==
=== Departments ===
BI has organized its academic activities into nine departments:

- Department of Accounting and Operations Management
- Department of Communication and Culture
- Department of Data Science and Analytics
- Department of Economics
- Department of Finance
- Department of Law and Governance
- Department of Leadership and Organizational Behaviour
- Department of Marketing
- Department of Strategy and Entrepreneurship

=== BI Research Centres ===
BI has established several research centers affiliated with the departments to foster knowledge development within selected sectors and topics:

- Centre for Applied Macroeconomics and Commodity Prices (CAMP)
- Centre for Asset Pricing Research (CAPR)
- Centre for Construction Industry
- Centre for Corporate Governance Research
- Centre for Creative Industries (BI:CCI)
- Centre for Experimental Studies and Research (CESAR)
- Centre for Health Care Management
- Centre for Household Finance and Macroeconomic Research (HOFIMAR)
- Nordic Centre for Internet and Society
- Simula@BI

== Presidents ==
- Finn Øien (1943–1975)
- Gerson Komissar (1975–1981)
- Jørgen Randers (1981–1989)
- Peter Lorange (1989–1993)
- Leif Frode Onarheim (1993–1997)
- Torger Reve (1997–2005)
- Tom Colbjørnsen (2006–2014)
- Inge Jan Henjesand (2014–2022)
- Karen Spens (2022–)

== Famous alumni ==
- Petter Stordalen
- Mette-Marit, Queen of Norway
- Johan Johannson
- Geir Karlsen
- Ole Robert Reitan
- Svein Richard Brandtzæg
- Isabelle Ringnes
- Elisabeth Grieg
- Stein Marius Varner
- Magnus Reitan
- Arne Hjeltnes
- Gerhard Helskog
- Harald Rønneberg
- Tina Bru

== Honorary doctorates ==
BI has a tradition of appointing honorary doctorates who have contributed with inspiration, demonstrated clear leadership, and achieved impressive results in their careers. The full list of Honorary Doctorates can be found at BI's website.

== See also ==
- List of business schools in Europe
- Earth for All initiative
