= Norwegian School of Economics =

Norwegian business school

- Norges handelshøyskole
- Type: Public
- Established: 1936
- Affiliations: CEMS, PIM, Erasmus, EQUIS, AMBA, AACSB
- Rector: Øystein Thøgersen
- Administrative staff: 399
- Students: 3,453
- Location: Bergen, Norway; 60°25′22.87″N 5°18′7.41″E
- Website: www.nhh.no/en/

The Norwegian School of Economics (Norwegian: Norges Handelshøyskole) or NHH is a business school situated in Bergen, Norway. It was founded in 1936 as Norway's first business school and is the leading teaching and research institution in Norway for the fields of management and business administration.

Admission to NHH is the most selective in the field of business administration in Norway and among the most selective of all study programs offered in Norway. The sole NHH undergraduate program consistently ranks among the most popular first choice for students applying for undergraduate study in Norway. In 2020, NHH was the most popular first choice of all undergraduate programs in Norway, with more than 2,100 first choice applications, and more than 5,000 in total, for 500 places.

The school participates in exchange programs with more than 170 foreign business schools and universities in over 50 countries, and around 40 percent of the school's students spend at least one semester on exchange. The school is a member of CEMS (The Global Alliance in Management Education) and the Partnership in International Management (PIM) network. It is accredited by EQUIS, AMBA and AACSB.

== History ==
Traditionally, economics was only taught at Norwegian universities, mainly at the University of Oslo, where it was first conceived, in the 19th-century as a sub-discipline of law. Business administration was not regarded as an academic discipline, and no formal education program was available. NHH was founded to provide the first formal training in business studies with a two-year vocational degree, called handelskandidat ("candidate of commerce"). In 1963 the handelskandidat degree was renamed siviløkonom and it later evolved into a four-year degree. The school today offers degrees at the master's and doctoral levels.

=== 1900–1936: Establishing a business school in Norway ===
At the end of the 19th-century, Oslo and Bergen business communities began discussing the need for a Norwegian business school. A number of schools had been opened across Europe, and during the early 20th-century several business schools were established in Scandinavia based on the German handelshochschule (business school) model. Among them was the Stockholm School of Economics which was founded in 1909. In 1917, Norway's parliament, the Storting, passed a resolution to establish a Norwegian business school.

=== 1936–1963: NHH opens and sets to work ===
After much lobbying and hard work, especially by Kristoffer Lehmkuhl, NHH was finally opened by King Haakon VII on Monday 7 September 1936, ten years before the University of Bergen was established. The strong involvement of the business community in Bergen had ensured not only that the school was established, but that it was based in Bergen. It closely linked to business community from the outset.

When NHH first opened, there were less than ten academic staff with 60 students enrolling each year. The first degree course offered was the Handelsdiplom (business diploma) and graduates received the title Handelskandidat (business graduate). This was initially a two-year course and, starting in 1938, a one-year additional course was offered to candidates who wanted to become teachers. In 1946 the Handelsdiplom course was extended to three years.

After the World War II, American influence became more important and also started to influence NHH to a greater extent. Graduates and staff began to go to the US to continue their studies and work for a period, a trend that greatly increased in the 1960s and 1970s. By the early 1950s the need for a doctoral programme at NHH had grown. In 1956, NHH received permission from the Norwegian government to award doctorates and in 1957 the first doctoral candidate graduated from NHH.

=== 1963–1980: A new campus and rapid growth ===
By the late 1950s NHH had outgrown its original premises and work began on developing a new campus for the school at Sandviken, just outside Bergen city centre. In 1963, the school moved to its new campus, an event which in many ways marked the transition to a new period characterised by a rapid increase in the number of students as well as teachers. The new campus provided a large increase in capacity and the annual intake of students increased from 60 to over 200.

An important feature of this period was the growth and development of the faculty. The new facilities made it possible to employ many new, talented people and the importance of research as well as teaching was strengthened. Many successful graduates went to the US to study for doctorates and came back to NHH with international experience and a more research based focus. Many faculty members took advantage of sabbaticals to study and continue their research overseas, many textbooks were published and the volume of publications in international journals increased significantly. A driving force behind this expansion and internationalisation of research was Professor Karl Borch.

During this time Professor Jan Mossin's seminal paper "Equilibrium in a Capital Asset Market" was published in Econometrica, contributing significantly to the development of the capital asset pricing model (CAPM). About the same time as Mossin returned to NHH from Carnegie Mellon with his doctorate, future Nobel laureate Finn E. Kydland went to the same university for his doctoral studies. Most of the US educated doctoral graduates came back to NHH to teach and continue their research, but some stayed in the US and a few (like Kydland) returned to NHH only to later go back to the US to continue their work.

As the faculty grew and developed so did the academic offerings, with several advanced level courses established. In 1963 the name of the Handelsdiplom degree was changed to siviløkonom, with graduate receiving the same title. A master level programme, høyere avdelingstudium (HAS), was introduced in 1972 as a preparation for siviløkonom students wishing to continue on to doctoral studies; and in 1973 Professor Dag Coward established a master level programme for students wishing to specialise in auditing, accounting and the financial management of firms, the høyere revisorstudium (HRS). In 1975 the siviløkonom degree course was extended to a four-year programme.

=== 1980–2000: Specialisation and international expansion ===
In the early 1980s it was realised that the doctoral programme required updating and a new, structured PhD programme was introduced involving taught courses in addition to the research and writing of a thesis. This new PhD programme continued the focus on research at NHH, rather than just teaching. The first candidate to graduate from the new PhD programme did so in 1985 and the annual number of graduates rose from 1 in 1985 to 12 in 1990.

The focus on expansion and internationalisation of research was recognised in 1984 as NHH was ranked 7th globally and 3rd in Europe in the American Economic Review amongst economics schools or departments in non-English speaking countries by publications in leading journals.

During this period, close relations with international research environments were also established. The international activities at the school have increased considerably and the international focus has become stronger over the years. In 1984 NHH established their first international exchange agreement with the Stockholm School of Economics, and in 1986 NHH became the first institution in Norway to offer a master's degree programme taught entirely in English - the Master of International Business (MIB). Following this, greater emphasis has been placed on exchange arrangements for students, and the school joined the prestigious Community of European Management Schools (CEMS) and the Erasmus programme in 1992 and the global Partnership in International Management (PIM) network in 1995.

Student and staff numbers continued to rise throughout the 1980s and 1990s. By 1985 there were 1670 students and 198 members of staff in total.

=== 2000–present: Continued growth and development into the 21st century ===
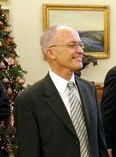
NHH alumni Finn Kydland was awarded the Nobel Prize in Economics in 2004 (with Edward C. Prescott) for his contributions to dynamic macroeconomics

The siviløkonom qualification was extended to 5 years in 2003. In line with the Bologna declaration, it now comprises a 3-year Bachelor of Science in Economics and Business Administration combined with a 2-year Master of Science in Economics and Business Administration.

NHH alumnus and Adjunct Professor Finn E. Kydland was awarded the Nobel Memorial Prize in Economic Sciences in 2004, together with Professor Edward C. Prescott of Arizona State University. Kydland was giving a lecture at NHH when news of the award arrived. Prescott was a Visiting Professor of Economics at NHH in 1974-75.

In 2007 NHH announced the launching of a new master programme taught fully in English, the MSc in Energy, Natural Resources and the Environment.

Today, NHH is part of a global network of business schools and universities. International partner institutions include:

- Columbia University
- Cornell University
- University of California, Berkeley
- New York University
- Duke University
- HEC Paris
- Bocconi University
- London School of Economics
- Imperial College London

On June 1, 2011, the school simplified and changed its English name from the Norwegian School of Economics and Business Administration to the Norwegian School of Economics.

=== List of rectors ===
1. Ingvar Wedervang, 1936–1956
2. Eilif W. Paulson, 1956–1957
3. Rolf Waaler, 1957–1963
4. Dag Coward, 1964–1972
5. Olav Harald Jensen, 1973–1978
6. Gerhard Stoltz, 1979–1984
7. Arne Kinserdal, 1985–1990
8. Leif Methlie, 1990–1995
9. Carl Julius Norstrøm, 1995–1998
10. Victor Norman, 1999–2001
11. Per Ivar Gjærum, 2001–2005
12. Jan I. Haaland, 2005–2013
13. Frøystein Gjesdal, 2013–2017
14. Øystein Thøgersen, 2017–

== Organization ==
NHH has six academic departments:

- Department of Accounting, Auditing and Law
- Department of Business and Management Science
- Department of Economics
- Department of Finance
- Department of Professional and Intercultural Communication
- Department of Strategy and Management

The school comprises over 2,800 full-time students and a total staff of over 330. NHH, together with two affiliated institutions, AFF (Administrative Research Institute) and SNF, form the largest centre for research and education within the fields of economics and business administration in Norway.

== Admissions ==
NHH annually admits 450 student to its sole undergraduate programme in Economics and Business Administration. The programme has for many years been the most popular undergraduate study programme in Norway, with more than 2000 "first priority" applicants annually and an admissions rate of around 20%. The school attracts applicants from all parts of Norway and aims to have a varied student body. NHH has an equal number of men and women as of 2012.

As a Norwegian public institution of higher education, NHH admits its students through Samordna opptak where applicants are ranked on a point scheme and the qualified candidates with the most points are granted admission.

Undergraduate NHH students are secured transfers to the school's master's programmes after completing the bachelor's degree. Most student take advantage of this policy. In addition, students from other universities and business schools are admitted to the master's and doctoral programmes, and make up the graduate student body.

Like all public institutions of higher education in Norway, NHH does not charge tuition fees. However, a small semester fee of NOK 490 (€ 41) is charged. This money helps fund the Student Welfare Organisation in Bergen, which subsidises kindergartens, health services, housing and cultural initiatives.

== Academics ==
The school offers one three-year undergraduate programme in Economics and Business Administration, taught in Norwegian. Most students continue their studies with a two-year master's degree, which together with the undergraduate degree completes the requirements for the Norwegian siviløkonom title. NHH offers eight master's profiles:

- Financial Economics
- Business Analysis and Performance Management
- Economic Analysis
- Marketing and Brand Management
- Economics
- Strategy and Management
- International Business (taught in English)
- Energy, Natural Resources and the Environment (taught in English)

Additionally, NHH offers a master's programme in Accounting and Auditing, as well as the CEMS Master's in International Management which is currently ranked as the world's second best Master's in Management programme by the Financial Times.

The NHH PhD programme offers specialisations in five fields:

- Accounting
- Economics
- Finance
- Management Science
- Strategy and Management

=== Double degree arrangements ===
NHH is part of six double degree arrangements:

- HEC Paris - MSc in Sustainable Development (HEC) / MSc in Economics and Business Administration (NHH)
- Louvain School of Management
- Mannheim Business School - MSc in Management (University of Mannheim) / MSc in Economics and Business Administration (NHH)
- Monterrey Institute of Technology and Higher Education
- Richard Ivey School of Business
- Lancaster University - MSc in International Business (Lancaster) / MSc in Economics (NHH)

== Rankings ==
In 2012, NHH was ranked among the 101-150 best universities worldwide Economics/Business, and 901-1000 overall, by the Academic Ranking of World Universities. in 2013, NHH dropped to the 151-200 bracket in Economics/Business in the same ranking. As of 2022, NHH is ranked 301-500 worldwide for Economics and Econometrics by QS ranking.

In 2013, NHH was ranked as the 46th best European business school by the Financial Times.

== Notable faculty and alumni ==
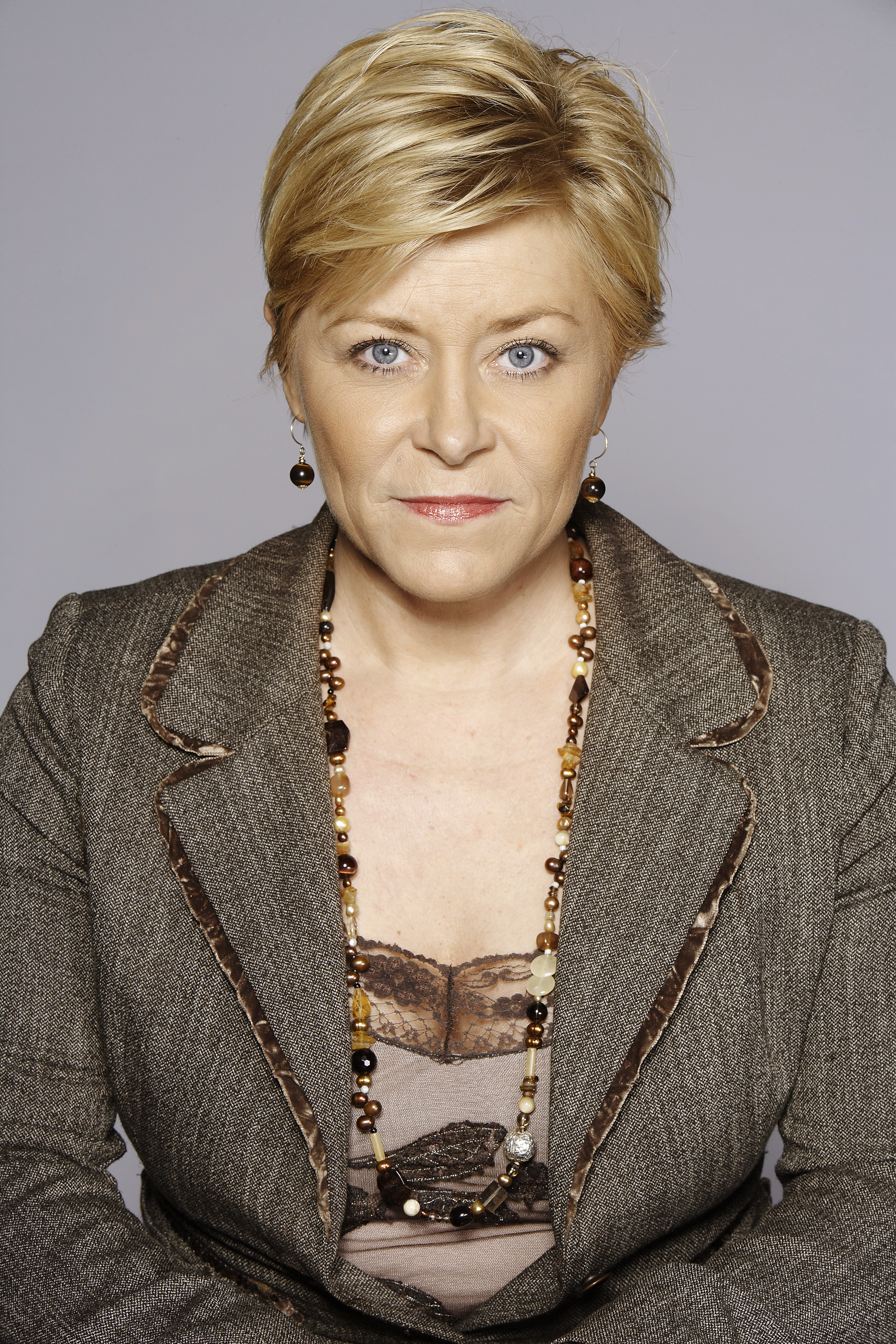
Siv Jensen, former leader of the Norwegian Progress Party and Norway's Minister of Finance

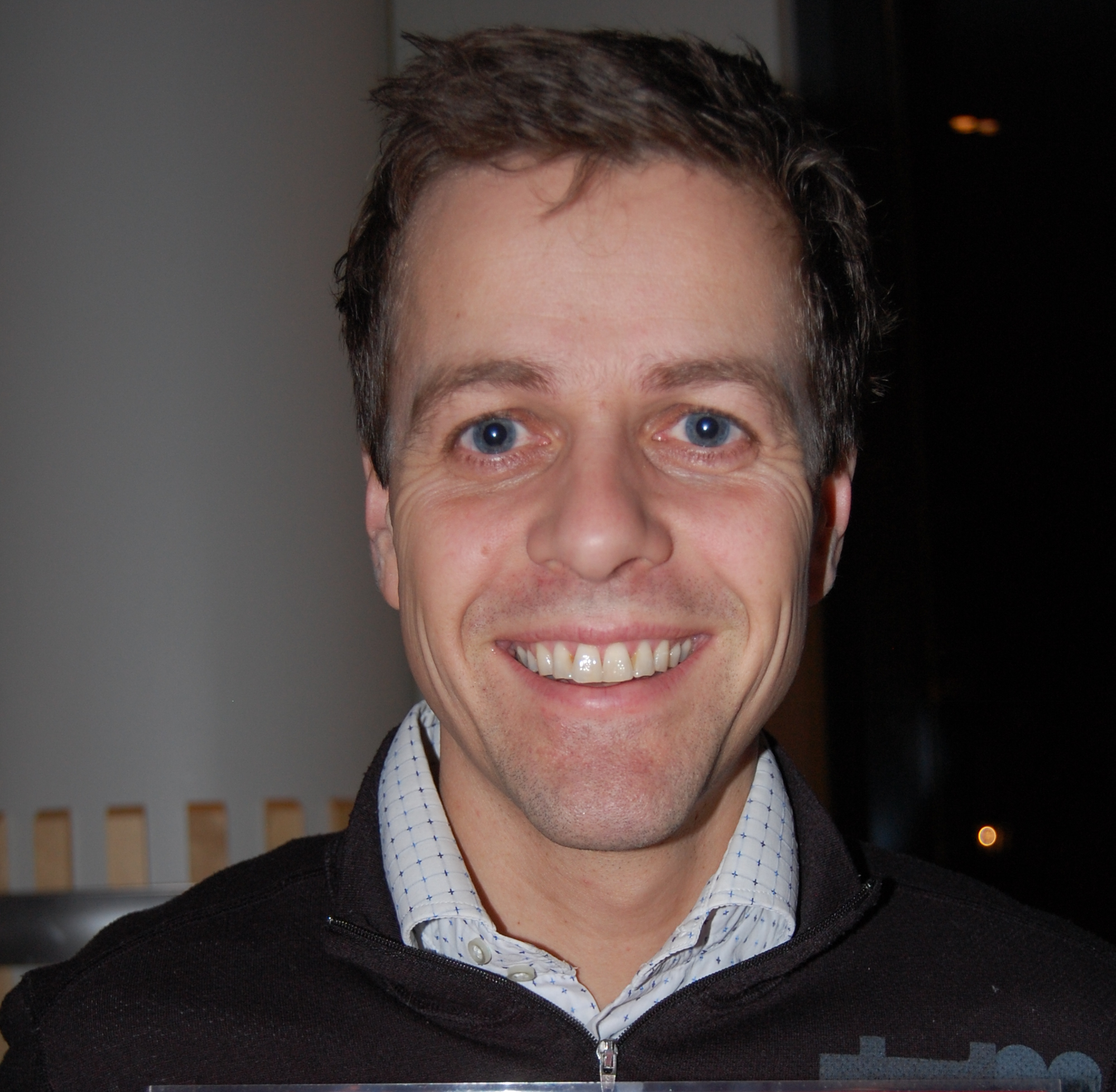
Knut Arild Hareide, former leader of the Norwegian Christian Democratic Party

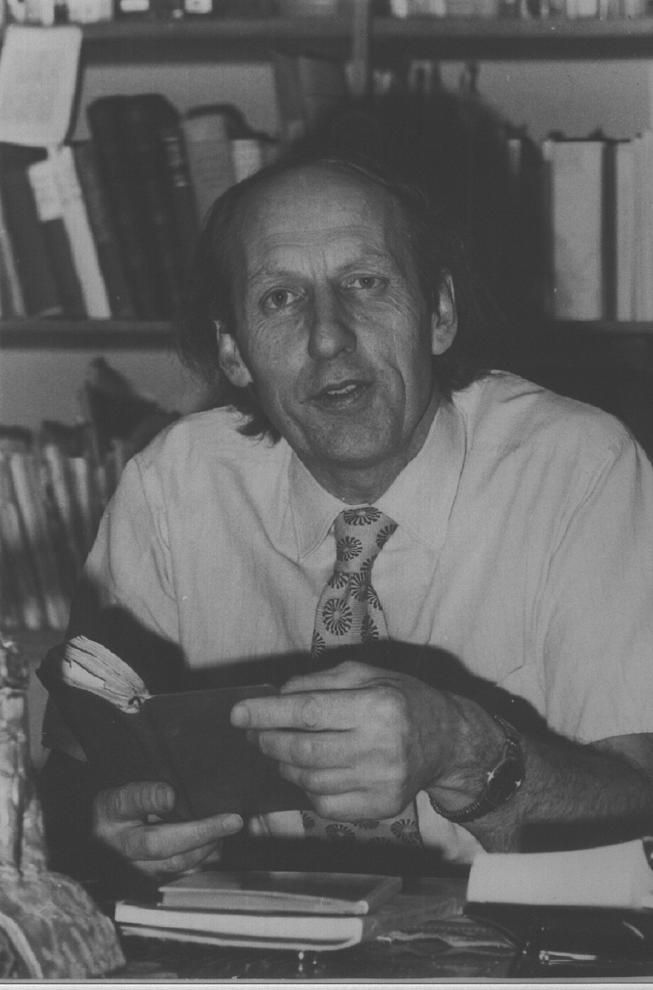
Thorolf Rafto, human rights activist and professor of Economic History

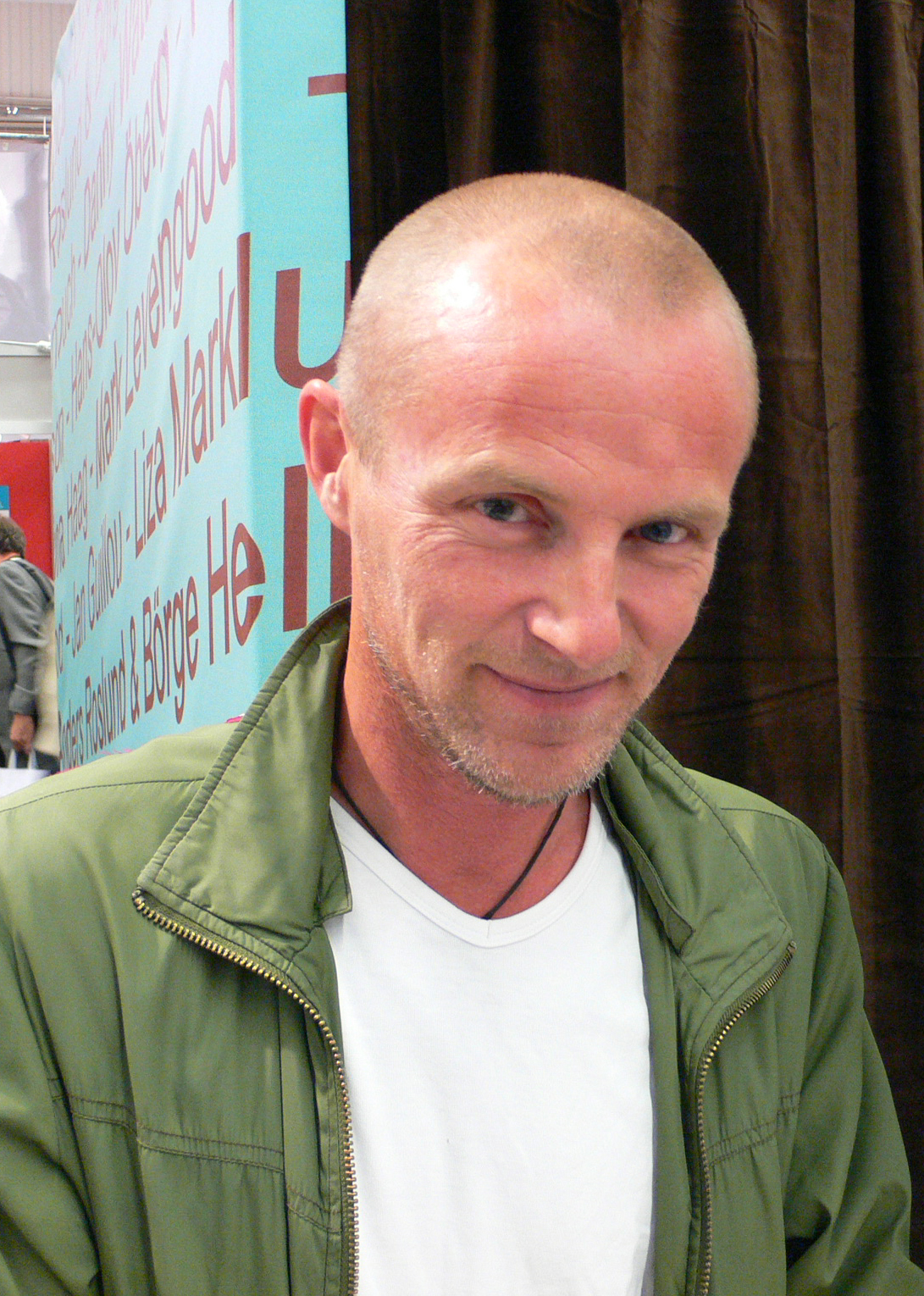
Jo Nesbø, award-winning author and musician

NHH alumni hold several important positions in Norwegian business and politics. Eldar Sætre is CEO of Equinor, Norway's largest company and the largest offshore oil and gas company in the world. Jon Fredrik Baksaas is CEO of Telenor, Norway's second largest company and one of the world's largest mobile phone operators. Siv Jensen is Norway's Minister of Finance and Yngve Slyngstad is CEO of Norges Bank Investment Management (NBIM), the part of the Norwegian Central Bank responsible for managing Norway's sovereign wealth fund.

=== Academics ===
- Finn E. Kydland, co-recipient of the Nobel Prize in Economics, 2004
- Edward C. Prescott, co-recipient of the Nobel Prize in Economics, 2004 (Visiting Professor of Economics, 1974–75)
- Jan Mossin, co-creator of the capital asset pricing model (CAPM)
- Victor D. Norman, former Minister of Labour and Government Administration, trade economist, politician, and newspaper columnist
- Agnar Sandmo, economist with several important contributions to public economics
- Tore Ellingsen, economist, member of the prize committee for the Nobel Prize in Economics
- Karl H. Borch, economist

=== Business ===
- Jon Fredrik Baksaas, former CEO Telenor
- Eldar Sætre, CEO Statoil
- Inge K. Hansen, former CEO Statoil, chairman Avinor
- Idar Kreutzer, CEO Storebrand
- Jannik Lindbæk, senior vice president, Aker Solutions
- Helge Lund, former CEO Statoil, CEO BG Group
- Dag J. Opedal, former CEO Orkla
- Erling Øverland, former president of NHO (Confederation of Norwegian Enterprise)
- Svein Aaser, former CEO DnB NOR
- Jens Ulltveit-Moe
- Olav Fjell former CEO Statoil, CEO Hurtigruten
- Ole Enger, president and CEO REC
- Paul-Christian Rieber, CEO GC Rieber and former president of NHO
- Peter Lorange, president of GSBA Zurich
- Tom Colbjørnsen, president of the BI Norwegian Business School
- Yngve Slyngstad, CEO Norges Bank Investment Management (NBIM)
- Svein Støle, Chairman Pareto Group
- Fredrik Halvorsen, CEO Seadrill
- Bjørn M. Wiggen, president and CEO Orkla
- Alf C. Thorkildsen, president and CEO Seadrill
- Arne Fredly, Norwegian investor
- Gregor Kummen, former CFO of the now defunct Adelsten clothing company
- Martin Skancke, sovereign wealth fund and asset-management expert

=== Government / Law / Public Policy / Human Rights ===
- Siv Jensen, politician, former leader of the Norwegian Progress Party and Norway's Minister of Finance
- Knut Vollebæk, former Norwegian Minister of Foreign Affairs and former Ambassador to the United States
- Kristin Krohn Devold, former Minister of Defense. Currently secretary general of the Norwegian Trekking Association (DNT)
- Kristin Clemet, former Minister of Education and Research. Currently director of the liberal think tank Civita
- Sushant Vaidik, Currently Member of Parliament, Rastriya Swatantra Party (2026-present)
- Knut Arild Hareide, former Minister of the Environment. Former leader of the Christian People's Party
- Hallvard Bakke, former Minister of Trade and Shipping. Member of the Norwegian Labour Party
- Heikki Holmås, former Minister of International Development (Norway)
- Thorolf Rafto, human rights activist and inspirator
- Torstein Dahle politician and economist, former leader of Rødt
- Aric Nesbitt, Republican Leader & former President Pro-Tempore, Michigan State Senate, former Commissioner, Michigan Lottery, and former majority floor leader, Michigan House of Representatives

=== Arts and Entertainment ===
- Agnar Mykle, author
- Jo Nesbø, musician and author
- Raske Menn, comedy group

== Affiliations ==
- CEMS – Community of European Managements Schools
- Erasmus programme
- PIM – Partnership in International Management
- EQUIS
- AMBA
- AACSB
