= 1895 in Norway =

- Centuries: 17th; 18th; 19th; 20th; 21st
- Decades: 1870s; 1880s; 1890s; 1900s; 1910s
- See also: 1895 in Sweden; List of years in Norway

Events in the year 1895 in Norway.

== Incumbents ==
- Monarch: Oscar II.
- Prime Minister: Emil Stang, later Francis Hagerup (from 14 October)

== Events ==
- 14 October – Francis Hagerup succeeded Emil Stang as Prime Minister of Norway

== Popular culture ==
=== Literature ===
- Olaus Alvestad and Lars Eskeland found Voss Folk High School
- The circle of poems Haugtussa by Arne Garborg is published.
- The poetry collection Bersøglis- og andre Viser by Per Sivle is published.

== Births ==
=== January to March ===
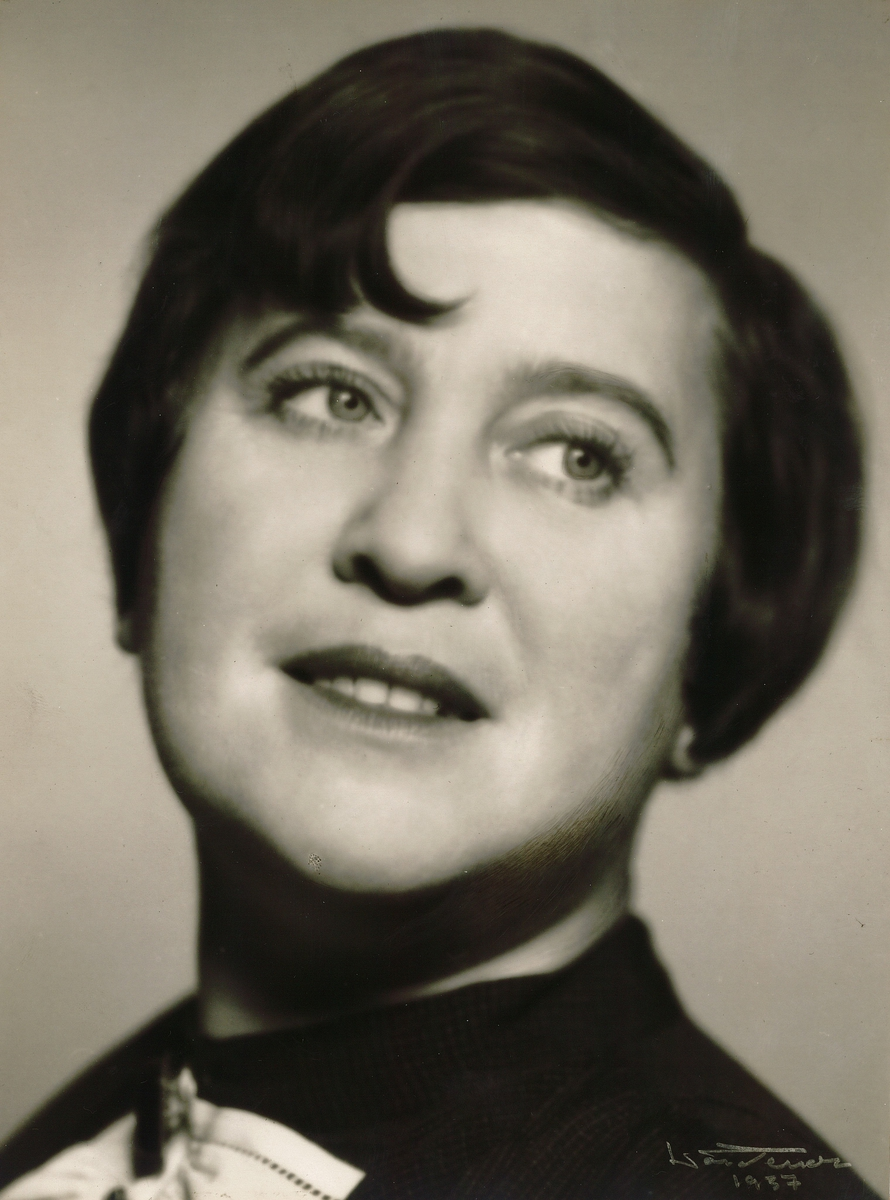
Botten Soot

- 18 January – Nils Jakob Hunstad, sportsperson, businessesman, politician and military officer (died 1978).
- 28 January – Johannes Pettersen Løkke, politician (died 1988)
- 23 February – Toralv Kollin Markussen, politician (died 1973)
- 25 February – Johan Bernhard Hjort, judge (died 1969)
- 3 March – Ragnar Anton Kittil Frisch, economist and Nobel Prize laureate (died 1973)
- 3 March – Adolf Nilsen, rower and Olympic bronze medallist (died 1927)
- 22 March – Botten Soot, actress, singer, and dancer (died 1958).
- 27 March – Ole Peder Arvesen, engineer and mathematician (died 1991).

=== April to June ===
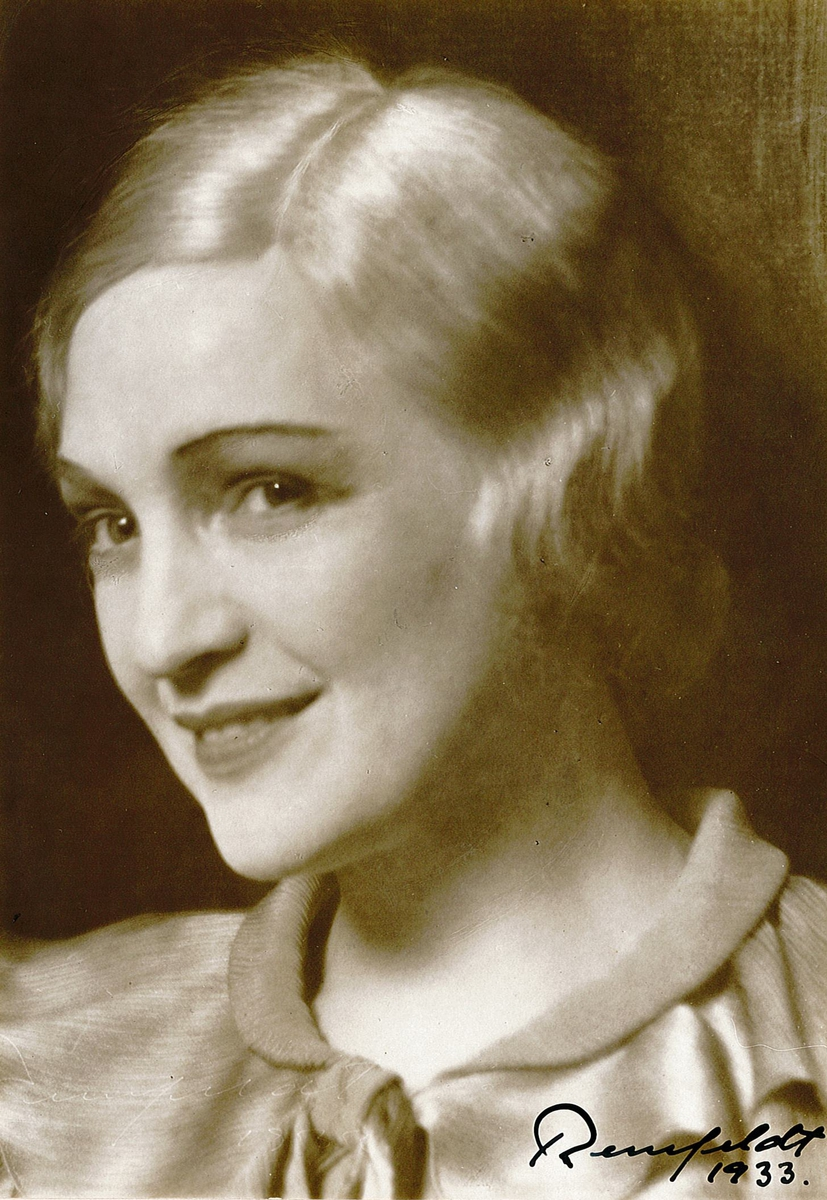
Gerd Grieg

- 21 April – Gerd Grieg, actress (died 1988)
- 29 April – Ronald Fangen, journalist and author (died 1946).
- 13 May – Lars Sæter, politician (died 1988)
- 30 May – Andreas Backer, journalist and organizational leader (died 1975).
- 5 June – Ingvarda Røberg, politician (died 1990)

=== July to September ===
- 12 July – Kirsten Flagstad, opera singer (died 1962)
- 26 July – Ola Fritzner, military officer (died 1983).
- 2 August – Einar Wilhelms, footballer (died 1978).
- 6 August – Paul Oskar Lindberget, politician (died 1983)
- 18 August – Jon Mårdalen, cross country skier (died 1977)
- 24 August – Lauritz Wigand-Larsen, gymnast and Olympic silver medallist (died 1951)
- 3 September – Erik Ørvig, sailor and Olympic gold medallist (died 1949)

=== October to December ===
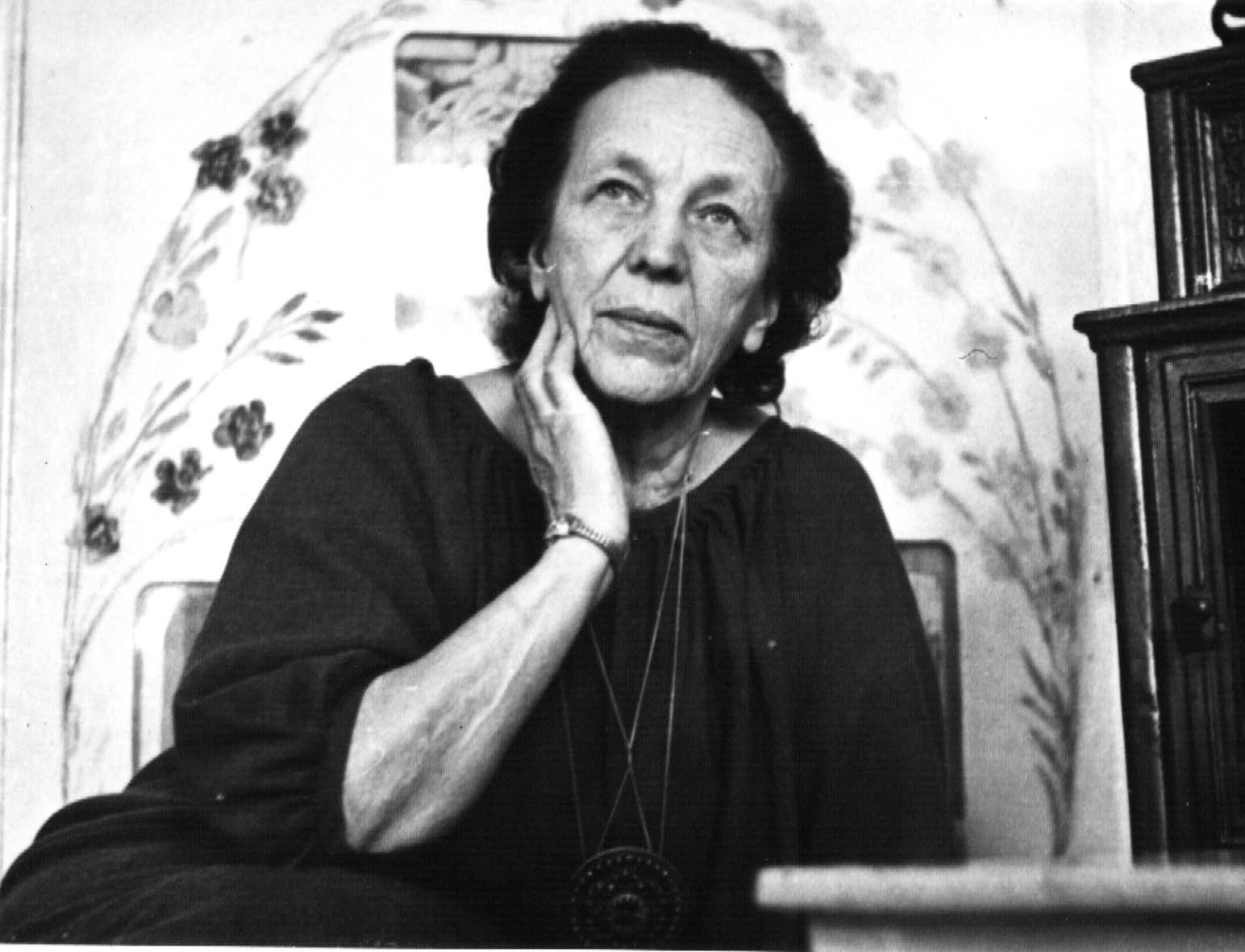
Ingeborg Refling Hagen

- 3 October – Johannes Olai Olsen, politician (died 1974)
- 3 October – Sigvald Svendsen, politician (died 1956)
- 20 October – Hans Reidar Holtermann, commander of Hegra Fortress (died 1966)
- 26 October – Signy Arctander, statistician and economist (died 1971).
- 12 November – Trygve Hoff, businessman, writer and editor (died 1982)
- 15 November – Hagbart Haakonsen, cross country skier
- 20 November – Fridtjof Paulsen, speed skater (died 1988)
- 29 November – Leif Bjorholt Burull, politician (died 1971)
- 13 December – Frieda Dalen, educator (died 1995).
- 17 December – Nils Asheim, politician (died 1966)
- 18 December – Einar Sverdrup, mining engineer and businessman (died 1942)
- 19 December – Ingeborg Refling Hagen, author and teacher (died 1989)
- 23 December – Gabriel Langfeldt, psychiatrist (died 1983).

=== Full date unknown ===
- Kristian Hansson, jurist and civil servant (died 1959)
- Oskar Omdal, Norwegian Navy pilot (died 1927)
- Gunnar Schjelderup, businessperson (died 1972)
- Leif Welding-Olsen, naval commander, first casualty in the war between Norway and Nazi Germany (died 1940)

== Deaths ==
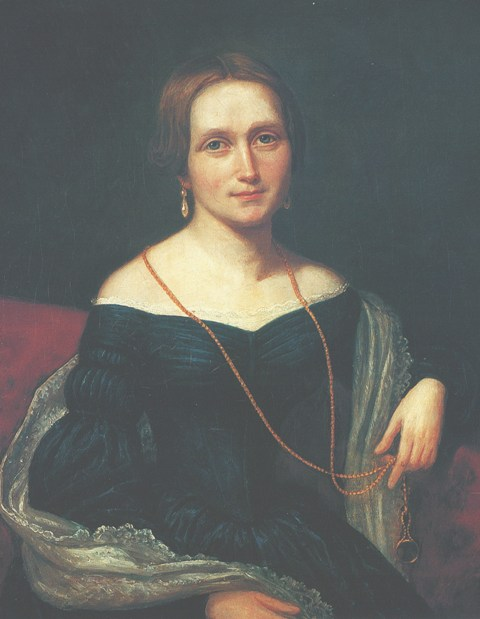
Camilla Collett

- 26 February – Kathinka Kraft, memoirist (born 1826).
- 6 March – Camilla Collett, writer and feminist (born 1813)
- 29 April – Johan Christian Collett, politician (born 1817)
- 19 August – Joseph Frantz Oscar Wergeland, military officer, cartographer and skiing pioneer (born 1815).
- 28 August – Andreas Olsen Sæhlie, farmer, distillery owner and politician (b. 1832).
- 17 December – Henrik Jæger, literary historian (born 1854).
- 24 December – Oluf Andreas Aabel, priest and writer (born 1825)
- 27 December – Eivind Astrup, explorer and writer (born 1871).

=== Full date unknown ===
- Hjalmar Hjorth Boyesen, author and college professor in America (born 1848)
- Knud Knudsen, linguist (born 1812)
- Simon Pedersen Holmesland, politician (born 1823)
