= 1959 in Norway =

- Centuries: 18th; 19th; 20th; 21st
- Decades: 1930s; 1940s; 1950s; 1960s; 1970s
- See also: List of years in Norway

Events in the year 1959 in Norway.

== Incumbents ==
- Monarch – Olav V.
- Prime Minister – Einar Gerhardsen (Labour Party)

== Events ==
- The Groningen gas field discovery in the Netherlands sparks interest in exploring hydrocarbons under the North Sea.
- 16 February – The Norwegian National Opera and Ballet holds its first performance in Folketeatret in Oslo.
- 26 June – The "Farmers' Party" (Bondepartiet) changes its name to the "Centre Party" (Senterpartiet).
- 19 July – Nikita Khrushchev cancels a planned visit to Norway, among others due to an alleged anti-Soviet press coverage.
- 29 December – The Norwegian government signs the EFTA free trade treaty. Norway becomes an EFTA member.
- Municipal and county elections are held throughout the country.

== Popular culture ==
=== Literature ===
- Harald Sverdrup, poet and children's writer, is awarded the Mads Wiel Nygaard's Endowment literary prize.

== Notable births ==
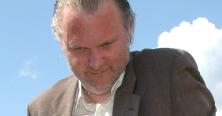
Jon Fosse

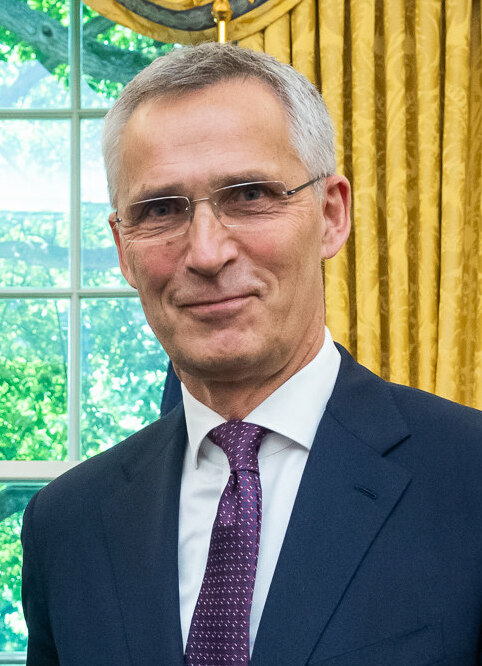
Jens Stoltenberg

- 19 January
  - Arne Borgstrøm, swimmer.
  - Sigmund Steinnes, politician (died 2018).
- 27 January – Elizabeth Norberg-Schulz, operatic soprano.
- 10 February – Steinar Ness, politician.
- 13 February – Arne Thomassen, politician.
- 23 February – Sidsel Wold, correspondent and non-fiction writer.
- 27 February – Tore Sagvolden, orienteering competitor.
- 9 March – Nils T. Bjørke, farmer, organisational leader and politician.
- 10 March – Ruth Mari Grung, politician.
- 16 March – Jens Stoltenberg, prime minister and Secretary-General of NATO
- 23 March – Unni Larsen, racing cyclist and dogsled racer.
- 1 April – Pål Farstad, politician.
- 3 April – Hanne Bramness, poet and translator.
- 10 April – Mona Juul, diplomat and politician
- 2 May – Sanna Grønlid, biathlete.
- 6 May – Morten Staubo, speed skater.
- 14 May – Bjørn Ousland, comics writer.
- 10 June – Bent Hegna, politician
- 22 June – Steffen Tangstad, boxer (died 2024).
- 27 June – Thure Erik Lund, author
- 29 June – Harald Tveit Alvestrand, computer scientist
- 5 July – Synnøve Brenden Klemetrud, politician
- 8 July – Tom Egeland, author
- 27 August – Frode Fjellheim, Sami musician
- 14 September – Morten Harket, A-ha lead singer
- 29 September – Jon Fosse, author and dramatist
- 21 October – Åslaug Haga, politician and Minister
- 1 November – Pål Gerhard Olsen, author.
- 7 November – Kristin Glosimot Kjelsberg, handball player.
- 28 November – Lars Sørgard, economist and civil servant.
- 2 December – Hans Kristian Amundsen, newspaper editor and politician (d. 2018)
- 28 December – Ragnhild Noer, judge.

== Notable deaths ==
- 21 March – Hartvig Caspar Christie, politician (born 1893)
- 17 May – Alf Grindrud, politician (born 1904)
- 16 June – Konrad Knudsen, painter, journalist and politician (born 1890)
- 3 July – Johan Bojer, novelist and dramatist (born 1872)
- 15 July – Peter Egge, writer (born 1869)
- 28 July – Roald Larsen, speed skater and Olympic silver medallist (born 1898)
- 5 September – Sigvald Hasund, researcher of agriculture, politician and Minister (born 1868)
- 21 November – Olav Meisdalshagen, politician and Minister (born 1903)

=== Full date unknown ===
- Eivind Berggrav, Lutheran bishop (born 1884)
- Sverre Grette, judge (born 1888)
- Kristian Hansson, jurist and civil servant (born 1895)
- Olaf Norli, bookseller and publisher (born 1861)
- Lars Slagsvold, veterinarian (born 1887)
- Sverre Kornelius Eilertsen Støstad, politician and Minister (born 1887)
- G. Unger Vetlesen, shipbuilder and philanthropist (born 1889)
