= Seigmenn =

Seigmenn may refer to:

- Seigmen – band
- Laban Seigmenn – brand of sweets
