= Total (Seigmen album) =

Studio album by Seigmen
- Released: 21 October 1994
- Recorded: August 1994 at Studio Nova, Spydburg, Norway
- Genre: Gothic rock, gothic metal, alternative rock, alternative metal
- Length: 57:53
- Label: 1:70
- Producer: Sylvia Massy

Seigmen chronology
Ameneon (1993)	Total (1994)	Metropolis (1995)

Professional ratings
Review scores
Source	Rating
AllMusic	4/5 stars

Total is the third studio album by Norwegian rock band Seigmen. It was released on 21 October 1994 through record label 1:70.

== Track listing ==
All lyrics are written by Kim Ljung; all music is composed by Klisne Seigmenn.

No.	Title	Length
1.	"Colosseum"	7:44
2.	"Ohm"	5:29
3.	"In Limbo"	5:42
4.	"Döderlein"	5:44
5.	"Sort Tulipan"	6:00
6.	"Lament"	4:26
7.	"Fortell"	4:32
8.	"Nephilia"	7:42
9.	"Monument"	4:54
10.	"Pantheon"	5:40

== Release ==
The album was certified gold in Norway in 2006.

== Personnel ==
- Alex Møklebust – vocals
- Kim Ljung - vocals, bass guitar
- Noralf Ronthi – drums, percussion, vocals
- Sverre Økshoff – guitar
- Marius Roth – guitar, acoustic guitar, vocals

Technical

- Sylvia Massy – production, engineering, mixing on all tracks except 7
- Eivind Skovdahl – engineering assistance
- Robert Opsahl-Engen – engineering assistance
- Bel Digital – mastering
