= Noer =

Noer may refer to:

== People ==
- Arifin C. Noer (1941–1995), Indonesian poet, theater director and film producer
- Deliar Noer (1926–2008), Indonesian Muslim scholar, politician, and lecturer
- Eva Noer Kondrup (born 1964), Danish composer
- Jajang C. Noer (born 1952), Indonesian actress and film producer
- Michael Noer (director) (born 1978), Danish film director
- Muhammad Noer (1918–2010), Indonesian politician
- Noer Alie
- Noer Muhammad Iskandar (1955–2020), Indonesian cleric
- Ragnhild Noer (born 1959), Norwegian judge

== Places ==
- Noer, Schleswig-Holstein, Germany
