= Aasheim =

Disambiguation page

Aasheim is a surname. Notable people with the surname include:

- Anne Aasheim (1962–2016), Norwegian editor
- Tor André Skimmeland Aasheim (born 1996), Norwegian footballer

== See also ==
- Alsheim
- Asheim
