= Sinners International =

Studio album by Zeromancer
- Released: 13 February 2009
- Genre: Industrial rock, electronic rock
- Producer: Zeromancer

Zeromancer chronology
I'm Yours To Lose (single) (2007)	Sinners International (2009)	The Death of Romance (2010)

Professional ratings
Review scores
Source	Rating
Spheremag	link
Gothtronic	link
Reflections of Darkness	Positive link
Release Magazine	link
Metal Ireland	3.9/5 link

Sinners International is the fourth album by Norwegian industrial rock outfit Zeromancer. On this album, Zeromancer returns to a darker, more industrial sound which was absent in its predecessor Zzyzx, sounding almost metal at times.

The album spawned 3 singles: "Doppelgänger (I Love You)", for which a music video was made, "I'm Yours to Lose", and "It Sounds like Love (But It Looks like Sex)".

== Release information ==
On 22 August 2008, the band announced that they had finished recording their fourth full-length album, Sinners International. The release date, 13 February 2009, was announced on 1 December 2008, although they did not specify if this release date was restricted to Europe. Along with this announcement, they also gave out their German tour dates, starting in Berlin, on 27 March 2009.

== Track listing ==
1. Sinners International – 5:02
2. Doppelgänger I Love You – 4:02
3. My Little Tragedy – 4:05
4. It Sounds like Love (But It Looks like Sex) – 3:22
5. Filth Noir – 4:13
6. Fictional – 4:03
7. I'm Yours to Lose – 3:19
8. Two Skulls – 4:10
9. Imaginary Friends – 4:01
10. Ammonite – 6:02

== Personnel ==
- Alex Møklebust – vocals
- Kim Ljung – bass, backing vocals
- Noralf Ronthi – drums
- Dan Heide – guitar
- Lorry Kristiansen – Keyboard, programming
