= Studentersamfundet =

Studentersamfundet or Studentersamfunnet can refer to one of several Norwegian student societies:

- The Student Society in Trondheim (Studentersamfundet i Trondhjem) in Trondheim
- The Norwegian Students' Society (Det Norske Studentersamfund) in Oslo

Studentersamfundet may also refer to the following Danish student organisations:

- Studentersamfundet (1882), a leftist breakaway group from the Studenterforeningen
- Studentersamfundet (Aalborg Universitet)
