= Zzyzx (Zeromancer album) =

Studio album by Zeromancer
- Released: 1 September 2003
- Genre: Industrial rock
- Labels: Cleopatra, Warner

Zeromancer chronology
Eurotrash (2001)	Zzyzx (2003)	Sinners International (2009)

Zzyzx is the third studio album of the Norwegian industrial rock band Zeromancer. The album takes its title from the name of a road leading to, and named for, Zzyzx, California.

This album saw Zeromancer approaching a lighter sound with a more mainstream direction, but also more meaningful lyrics. The album spawned two singles, "Erotic Saints" followed by "Famous Last Words".

This was also their only album released through the Warner Music Group.

== Reception ==
Jason MacNeil of AllMusic drew comparisons to bands including Nine Inch Nails, Depeche Mode and OMD, and summarised Zzyzx as "a record that is generally good but lacking the one high point that would give it a longer shelf life".

== Track listing ==
1. "Teenage Recoil"
2. "Hollywood"
3. "Famous Last Words"
4. "Erotic Saints"
5. "Idiot Music"
6. "Stop the Noise!"
7. "Feed You with a Kiss"
8. "Lamp Halo"
9. "Mosquito Coil"
10. "Blood Music"
11. "New Madonna" (bonus track)
12. "Gone to Your Head" (bonus track)
13. "Fractured" (bonus track)

There are several different versions of this album all with different songs at the end. This is track listing for 2004 Cleopatra Records version. All songs by Keller, Ljung, and Schröder. The last two songs are special tracks.

== Personnel ==
- Alex Møklebust – vocals
- Kim Ljung – bass, backing vocals
- Noralf Ronthi – drums
- Chris Schleyer – guitar
- Erik Ljunggren – keyboard, programming
