= Ameneon =

Studio album by Seigmen
- Released: April 5, 1993
- Studio: Athletic Sound
- Genres: Alternative metal, doom metal
- Length: 41:28
- Label: 1:70
- Producers: Kai Ø. Andersen, Seigmen

Seigmen chronology
Pluto (1992)	Ameneon (1993)	Total (1994)

Ameneon is the first full-length album by Norwegian rock band Seigmen. The album came in two editions: one on the 1:70 label and one on the Voices of Wonder label.

== Track listing ==
All lyrics are written by Kim Ljung; all music is composed by Seigmen.

No.	Title	Length
1.	"Simone"	5:47
2.	"Monsun"	5:22
3.	"Negativ"	7:01
4.	"Plutonium"	4:47
5.	"Ameneon"	3:16
6.	"Korsfarer"	3:16
7.	"Mesusah"	9:01
8.	"Ikon"	2:58
Total length:		41:28

== Personnel ==
- Alex Møklebust – lead vocals
- Marius Roth Christensen – guitars
- Sverre Økshoff – electric guitar
- Kim Ljung – bass guitar, vocals
- Noralf Ronthi – drums
