= UKErevyen =

Student revue in Trondheim, Norway

UKErevyen (literally meaning "The revue of UKA") is the traditional revue shown during the biannual cultural festival UKA in Trondheim, Norway.

== History ==
=== Overview ===
The revue UKErevyen has been made by students every second year since the beginning in 1917, except during World War II, in order to supply the students' society with enough money to run for another two years. During the years, both the revue and its subsequent festival has grown continuously.

=== In detail ===
Back in 1917, the newly founded students' community in Trondheim (Samfundet) was in a financial crisis. As a last resort, the students made a revue on their own; the revenue were to assure the future of Samfundet. The boss of Samfundet's own theatre got a script from the student theatre in Oslo, and managed to talk the others into trying to make money on it, despite the fact that the earlier shows they had put on had just worsened the financial situation. Less than a month later, the first UKErevy (revue of UKA) premiered. The show lasted for a week (a "week" in Norwegian is "uke", hence the name UKA, "the week") and was a huge success. After a couple of years the money was spent, the urge and need was back, and thus a tradition began: Every second year a show would be put on to assure Samfundet's future. However, from now on, they would write the material themselves.

The first UKA revues were never really finished before opening, and it wasn't before the 1933 NÆMESiS that the audience could experience a large-scale, thoroughly worked-with revue. From now on the UKErevy became a more professional revue.

During the 1930s the revues were coloured by the social and political disturbances in Europe. The 1939 revue Tempora criticized largely the rearmament and racial discrimination seen on the continent. The revue's poster, where a threatening giant lizard arises behind partying students, proved an omen of what to come.

The line of festivals was itself affected by World War II, as the nazis took over the community's house and thus in 1941 and 1943 there was no revue shown. However, the 2005 revue Origo tells the story of a show indeed being written and rehearsed in 1943, on the authority of Norwegian Nazi sympathizer Vidkun Quisling, in order to turn the citizens of Trondheim to the nazi's side. However, the show was sabotaged by a Norwegian rebel, not unlike the sabotage at Rjukan during the war. Quisling discovered the day before the premiere that his revue made fun of the nazis instead of portray them well, and in rage he demanded the revue cancelled. Origo further on tells that the script, film reels and costumes was found below Samfundet during a renovation in 2005, and so a reconstruction of the sabotaged never-existing play Quiss-e-ling could be shown in the 2005 revue, to acclaim the until-now unknown war hero.

Already in 1945, UKErevyen was back with Go-a-head, an optimistic show that looked forward, telling the viewers not to let blame and hatred reign. 1947's Fandango, however, had already discovered the Cold War, and in a time where most Norwegians focused on rebuilding the country, the revue warned about the technological society and uncritical use of science.

Themes brought up over the years include communism, worshipping one's own reflection, technology hype, and more recently, the new generation of people who has everything they want and still want more, and coping with the world's numerous demands to you as an individual, when you perhaps should listen more to yourself.

Since the beginning, the revue has grown largely in both terms of the number of people involved and revenue. As mentioned; over the years a full-blown festival blossomed up around the revue. Its primary goal is still to keep the students' community running, and 2003 was in fact the first year in the history of UKA and UKErevyen that Samfundet made enough money on its own to be able to survive without UKA. The festival and its heart, the revue, is regardlessly continuing to prosper, and "the week" now ironically lasts over three weeks. During the 24 days the festival lasts, the revue is shown 30 times, selling somewhere around 25.000 tickets.

== Traditions ==
Both UKA and the revue has many traditions. Some evolve over time, likewise some fade out and are forgotten as new students arrive to arrange new festivals. Thus, it's just as hard to determine how old the current traditions are, as it is to try to find out what traditions are lost. One set of traditions concern the name of UKErevyen, which also becomes the name of the entire festival.

=== The content ===
A few traditions follow the revue itself as well.

Songwise, there must be a song about or related to drinking and one that revolves around the city in which the revue is played, Trondheim. A tradition that used to be, is that there should be a song about being a student. This tradition is, to some extent, awoken again in 2005.

When it comes to the sketches, few traditions remain. There is said to be a "rule" that at least one of the skits have to include some kind of animal.

== See also ==
- UKA
- Studentersamfundet i Trondhjem
