= Fritzner =

Fritzner is a surname. Notable people with the name include:

- Herzl Fritzner (1919–2007), Israeli footballer and manager
- Julius Fritzner (1828–1882), Norwegian restaurateur and hotelier
- Ola Fritzner (1895–1983), Norwegian military officer
- Otto Thott Fritzner Müller (1864–1944), Norwegian schoolteacher and politician
