= Stalheimsfossen =

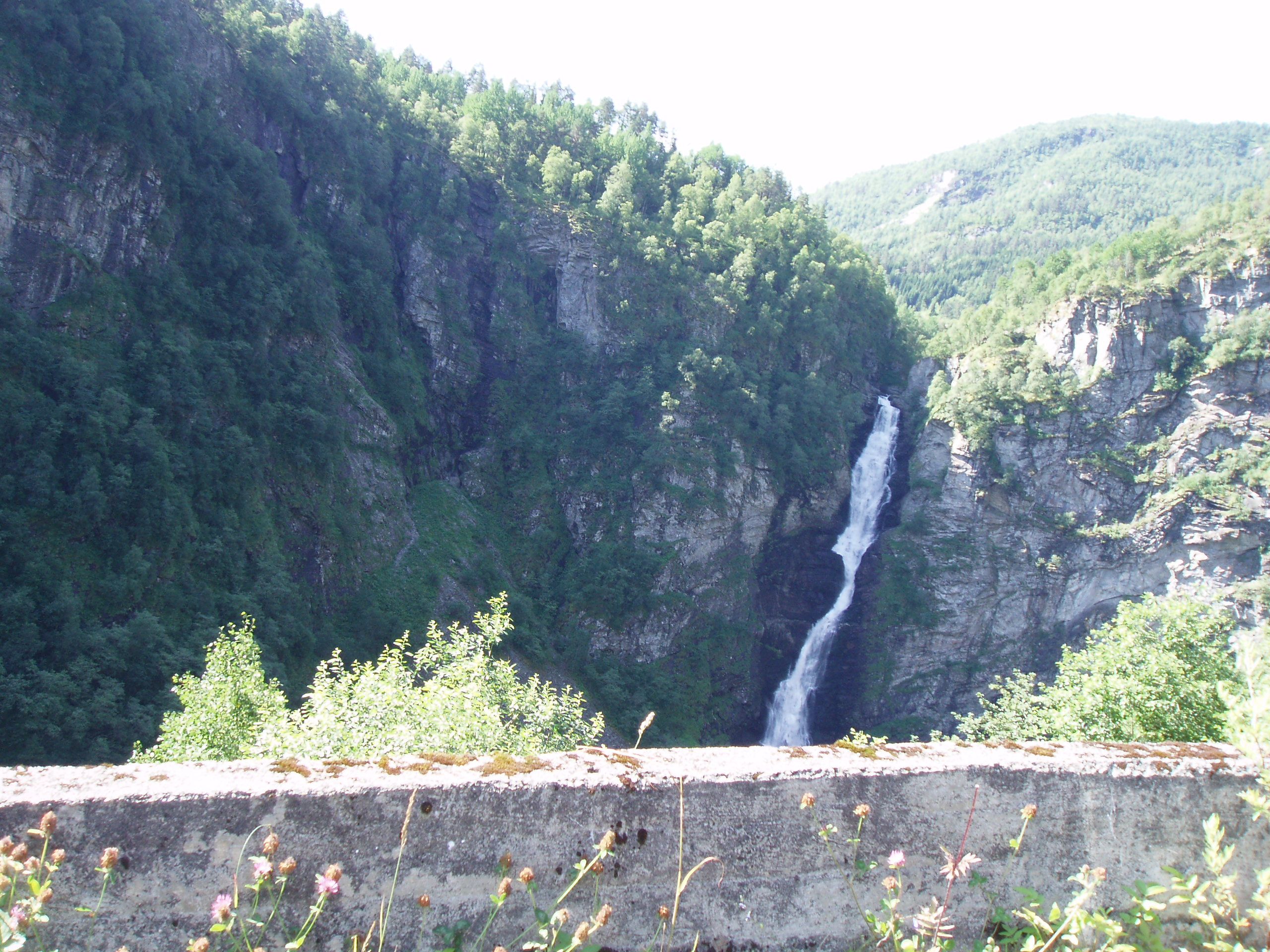
- Interactive map of Stalheimsfossen
- Location: Vestland, Norway
- Coordinates: 60.83439°N 6.68568°E
- Type: Horsetail
- Elevation: 237 metres (778 ft)
- Total height: 126 metres (413 ft)
- Number of drops: 1
- Longest drop: 126 metres (413 ft)
- Total width: 30 metres (98 ft)
- Average width: 12 metres (39 ft)
- Run: 30 metres (98 ft)
- Watercourse: Stalheimselvi
- Average flow rate: 11 m^{3}/s (390 cu ft/s)

Stalheimsfossen is a waterfall located in the village of Stalheim in Voss Municipality in Vestland county, Norway. The waterfall has one 126-metre (413 ft) tall horsetail drop. The famous Stalheim Hotel lies just a short distance from the falls. The river Stalheimselvi is funneled through a small opening in a cliff before flowing out over the falls, into a bowl-shaped gorge at the bottom, ejecting a large spray of water at the bottom.

== See also ==
- List of waterfalls#Norway
