= Stalheim =

Village in Voss Municipality, Norway

- Village
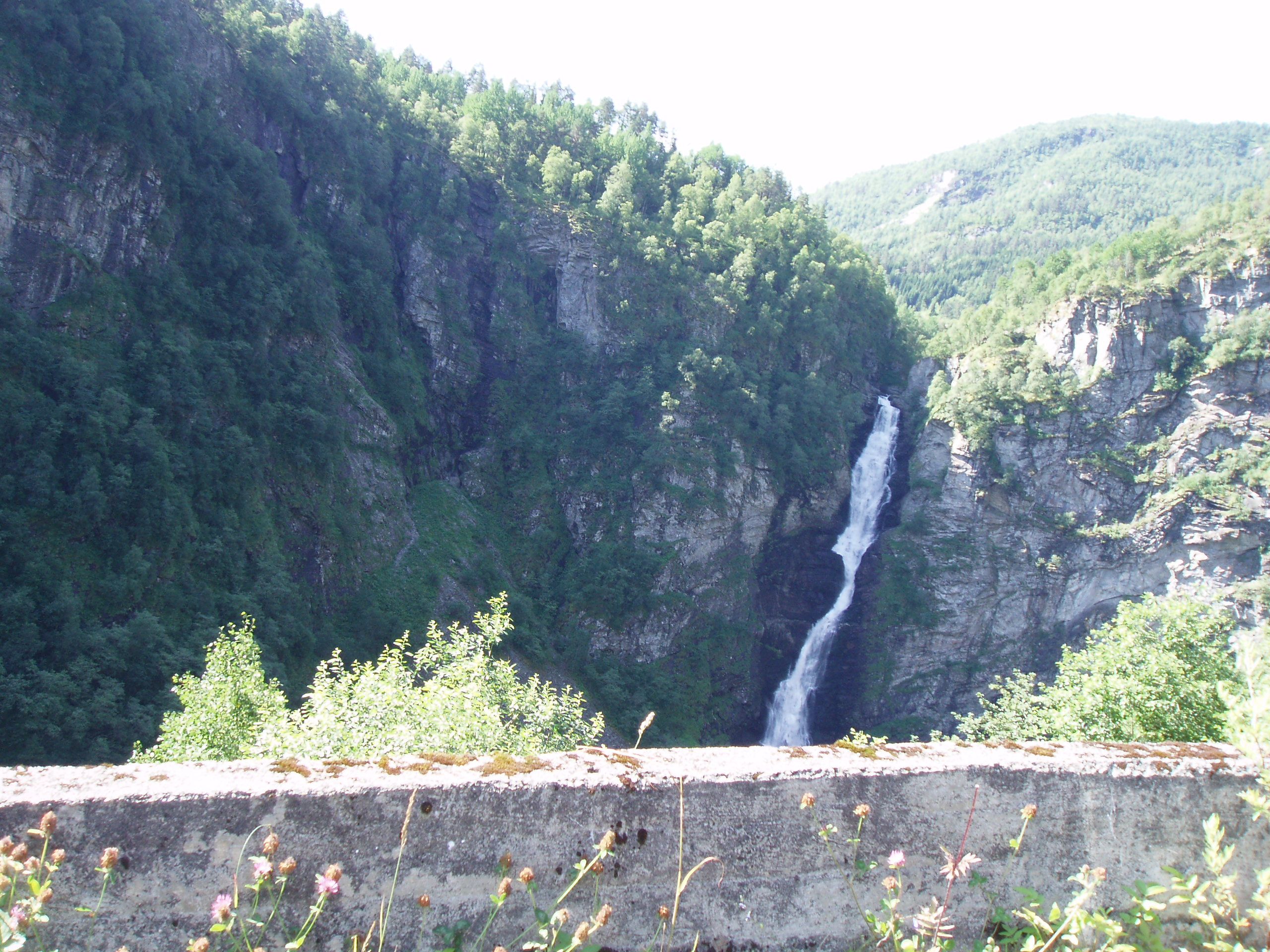
- View waterfall Stalheimsfossen
- Interactive map of Stalheim
- Coordinates: 60.83626°N 6.6799°E
- Country: Norway
- Region: Western Norway
- County: Vestland
- District: Voss
- Municipality: Voss Municipality
- Elevation: 370 m (1,210 ft)
- Time zone: UTC+01:00 (CET)
  - Summer (DST): UTC+02:00 (CEST)
- Post Code: 5715 Stalheim

Stalheim is a village in Voss Municipality in Vestland county, Norway. The small village lies along the European route E16 highway in the northeastern part of the municipality. The village sits at a high point in the inner part of the Nærøydalen valley which leads northeastwards towards the Nærøyfjorden. The highway runs through a series of tunnels to descend into the valley; in 2021 authorities said that the old road Stalheimskleivi will be closed for cars and buses forever; the road has hairpin turns and 20% grade.

The Stalheimsfossen waterfall is the most notable sight in the area. The view from Stalheim is well known from several paintings, in particular Johan Christian Dahl's painting Fra Stalheim from 1842. Sivlesteinen, a memorial of the poet Per Sivle, was raised by Noregs Ungdomslag and other organizations at Stalheim in 1909.

== History ==
In 1943 Lebensborn activity took over the use of Stalheim Hotel.

== Media gallery ==
Dahl's Fra Stalheim (1842)

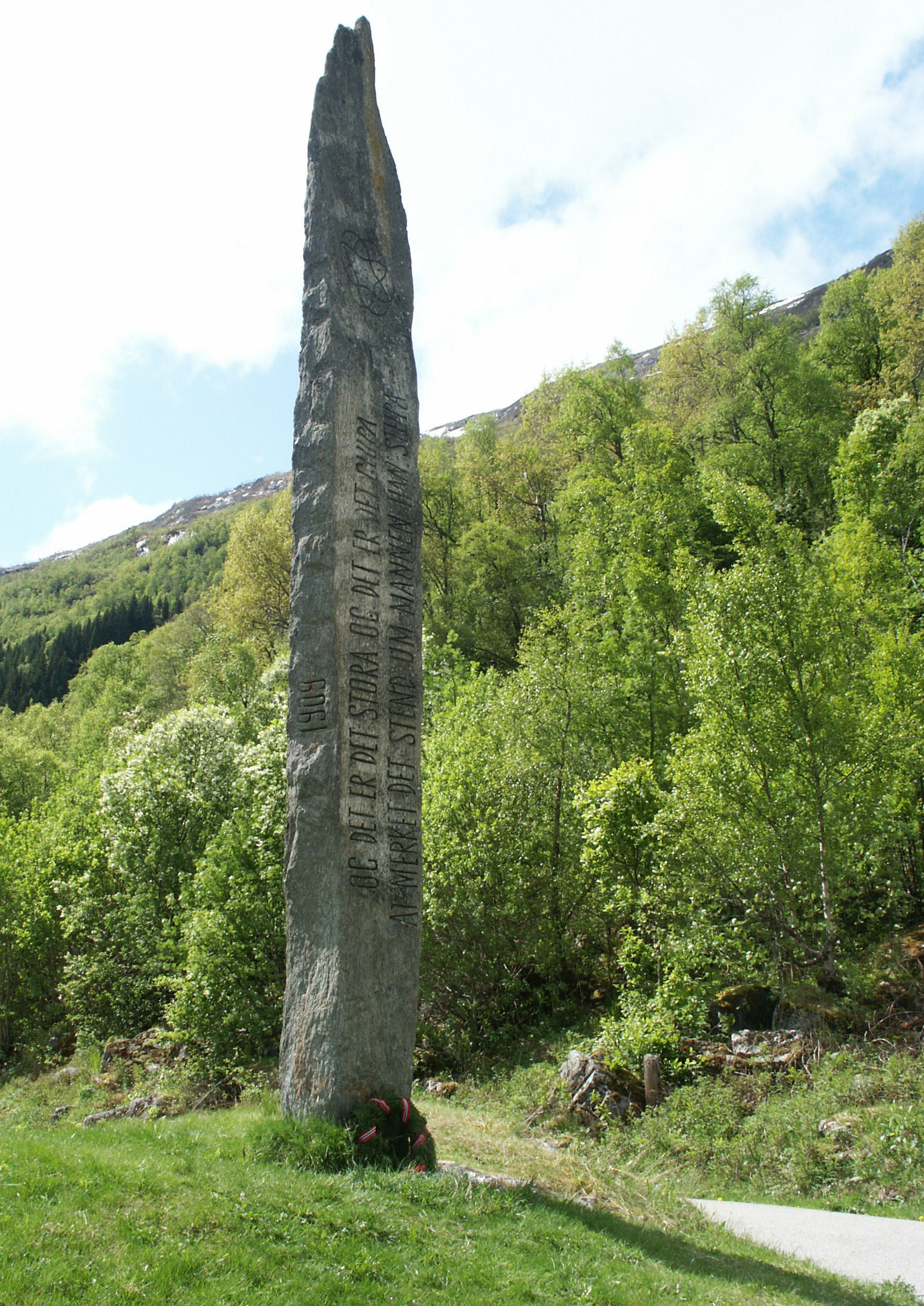
Per Sivle memorial stone at Stalheim

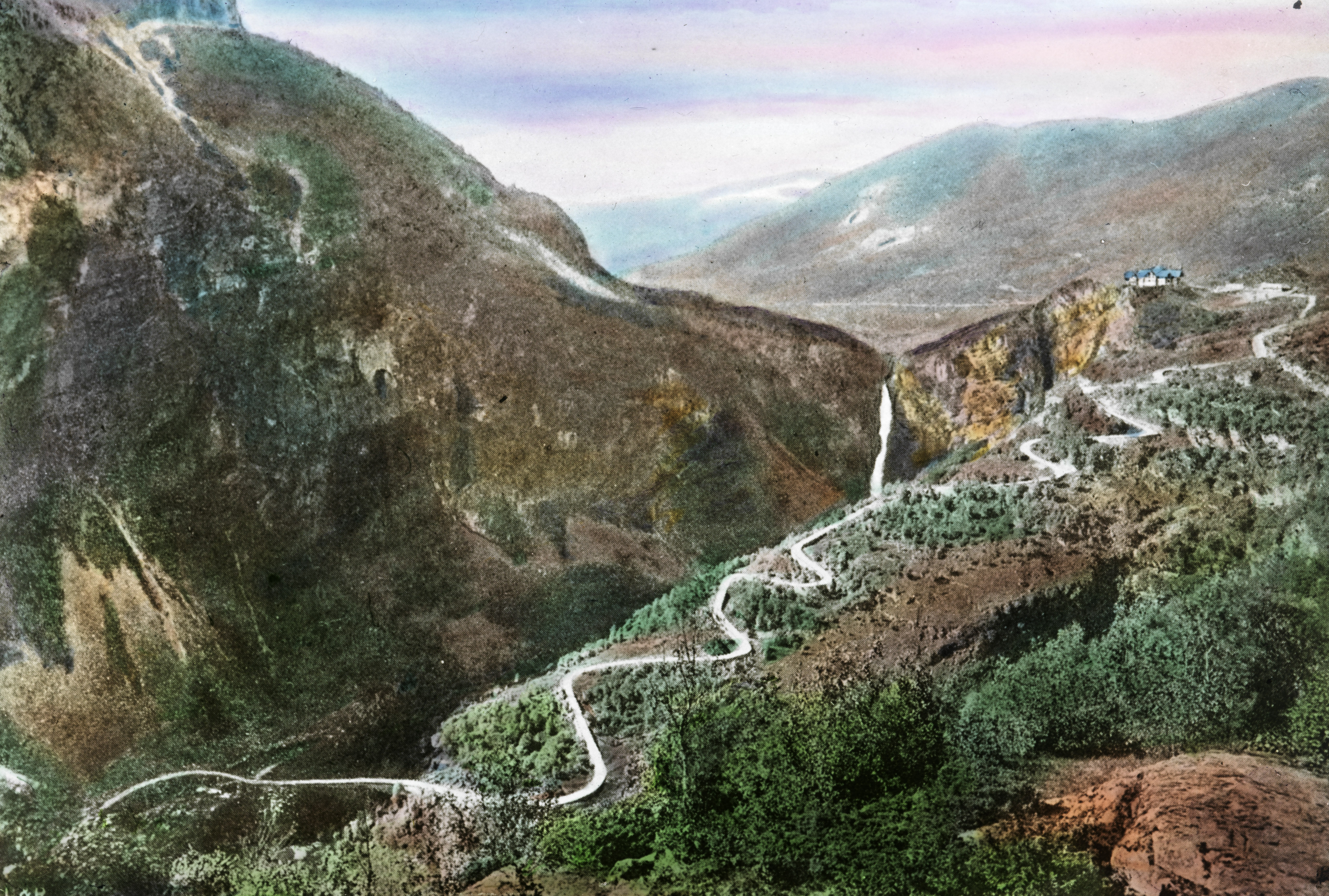
View of the old Stalheimskleiva road (with the hotel at the top)

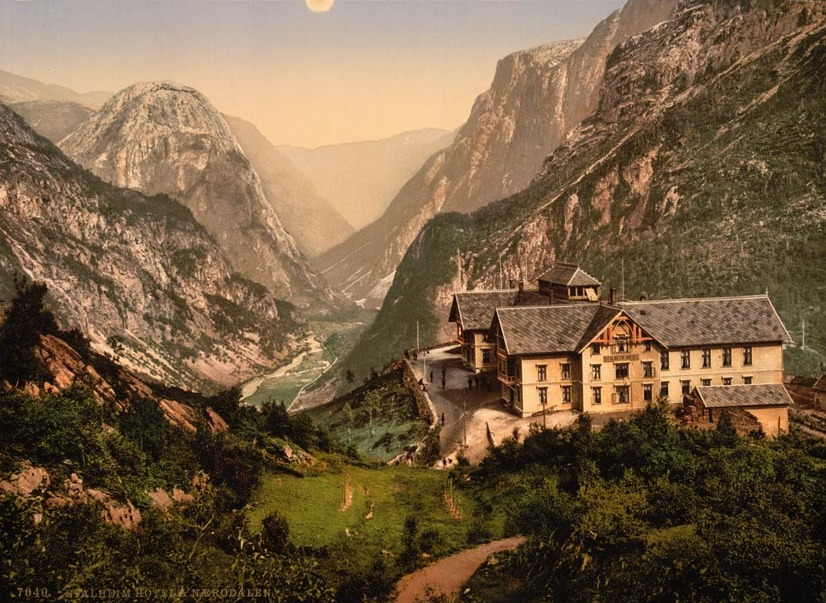
View of the Hotel, looking down into the Nærøydalen valley
