= Asheim =

Asheim is a Norwegian surname. Notable people with the surname include:

- Henrik Asheim (born 1983), Norwegian politician for the Conservative Party
- Lester Asheim (1914–1997), American Professor of Library Science
- Nils Asheim (1895–1966), Norwegian politician for the Liberal Party
- Steve Asheim (born 1970), American drummer and songwriter

== See also ==
- Asheim, Norway, Sunnfjord, Sogn og Fjordane, Norway
