= Clone Your Lover =

Studio album by Zeromancer
- Released: 13 March 2000 (Norway); 26 June 2000 (Germany); 18 March 2003 (US)
- Genre: Industrial rock
- Length: 37:00
- Label: Cleopatra; Sony Music Entertainment
- Producer: James Saez

Zeromancer chronology
Clone Your Lover (2000)	Eurotrash (2001)

Clone Your Lover is the first studio album of the Norwegian industrial rock band Zeromancer.

== Track listing ==
All tracks composed by Kim Ljung.

1. "Clone Your Lover" – 3:50
2. "Flirt (With Me)" – 3:59
3. "Something for the Pain" – 3:32
4. "Split Seconds" – 3:16
5. "Fade to Black" – 3:55
6. "God Bless the Models" – 4:10
7. "Opelwerk" – 3:27
8. "Flagellation" – 3:53
9. "Die of a Broken Heart" – 3:25
10. "Houses of Cards" – 3:58
11. "Something for the Pain (Apoptygma Berzerk Remix)" (on US version)

== Personnel ==
- Alex Møklebust – vocals
- Kim Ljung – bass, backing vocals
- Noralf Ronthi – drums
- Chris Schleyer – guitar
- Erik Ljunggren – keyboards, programming

=== Production personnel ===
- James Saez - producer
- Ronald Prent - mixing
- Björn Engelmann - mastering
