= Zeromancer =

Norwegian industrial rock band

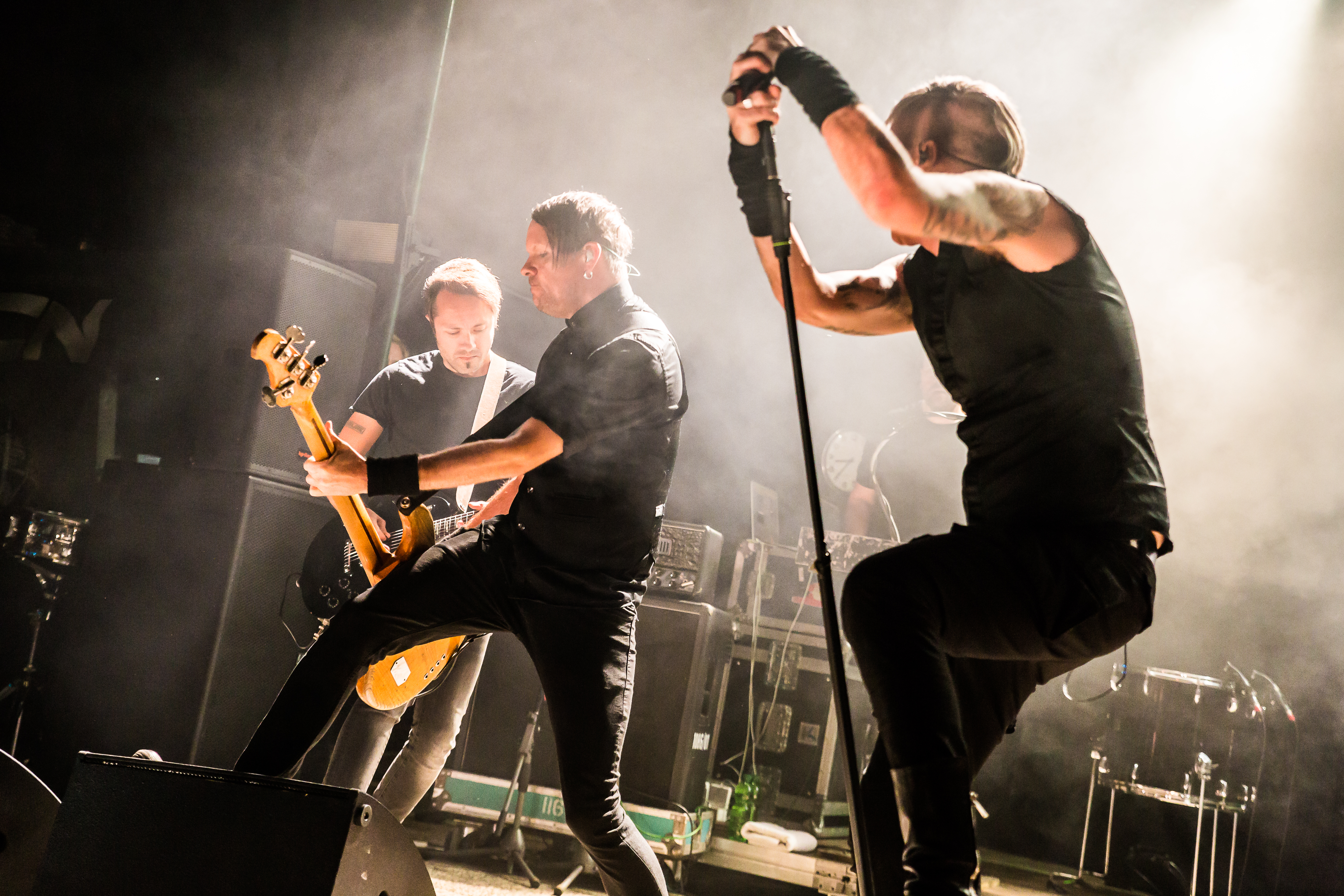
- Zeromancer live at Nocturnal Culture Night 2018 in Germany

Background information
- Origin: Norway
- Genres: Industrial rock, synthpop
- Years active: 1999–2013, 2018–present
- Labels: Warner, Sony, Cleopatra, Trisol
- Spinoffs: Ljungblut, Affected
- Spinoff of: Seigmen
- Members: Alex Møklebust; Kim Ljung; Noralf Ronthi; Per-Olav Wiik; Lorry Kristiansen
- Past members: Chris Schleyer; Erik Ljunggren; Dan Heide

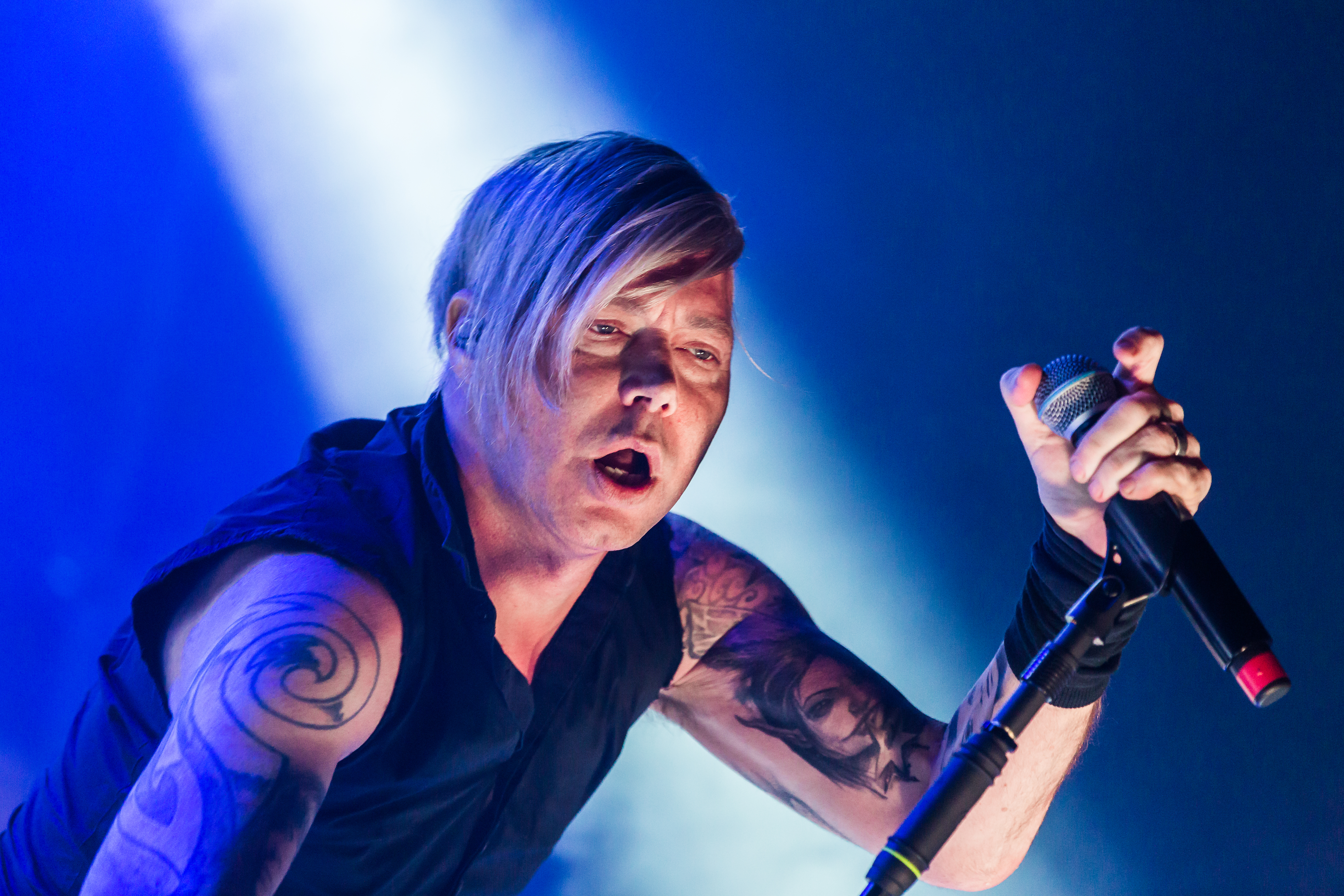
Singer Alex Møklebust at Nocturnal Culture Night Festival 2018

Zeromancer is a Norwegian industrial rock band formed in 1999 by members of the band Seigmen. The current lineup is Alex Møklebust (vocals), Kim Ljung (bass guitar/backup vocals), Noralf Ronthi (drums), Lorry Kristiansen (programming) and Per-Olav Wiik (lead guitar). They have released seven studio albums; the latest, Orchestra of Knives, was released in 2021.

== History ==
=== Formation and Clone Your Lover (1999–2000) ===
The core of Zeromancer met in the influential Norwegian band Seigmen. During the 1990s, Seigmen dominated the Norwegian rock scene and also made a name for themselves internationally, playing concerts abroad. When Seigmen split in January 2000, Kim Ljung (bass guitar/backup vocals) and Erik Ljunggren (programming) went to Los Angeles and got an idea for a new band called Zeromancer. Two more members of Seigmen joined them in Los Angeles: Alex Møklebust (vocals) and Noralf Ronthi (drums). James Saes recorded the first demos with the band and stood in as their guitar player. A little later, the band was complete, when they joined with Chris Schleyer (guitar), formerly of Kidneythieves and Prick which was released under Trent Reznor's label Nothing Records.

On 13 March 2000, Zeromancer released their first album, Clone Your Lover. The title track was a minor hit at many clubs and venues. The album also won Zeromancer the award for the best newcomer of 2000 at the German Alternative Music Awards. A music video was created for the song "Clone Your Lover".

=== Eurotrash and US tour (2001–2003) ===
In 2001, Zeromancer released the album Eurotrash, which featured a cover version of the song "Send Me an Angel" by Australian band Real Life, the original having been a major hit in 1983. A music video was created for the song "Dr. Online".

In spring 2003, coinciding with the US reissue of Clone Your Lover, the band toured in the United States with the early 1990s bands Pigface and My Life with the Thrill Kill Kult. This tour did much to increase Zeromancer's fanbase in the United States. The tour also let Zeromancer take a break from recording their third studio album, working on it after the tour was over.

=== Zzyzx, Chris Schleyer departure and hiatus (2003–2006) ===
In autumn 2003, Zeromancer released their third album, Zzyzx. The songs on the album were a lot calmer than the first two albums, which fans had not expected. The name comes from a street sign that the band saw while touring in the United States. In San Bernardino County, California, there is a place named Zzyzx Springs, which was named to ensure that it would be last in the index of all US place names. A music video was created for the song "Erotic Saints".

Following the release, Chris Schleyer left the band and joined A Perfect Circle as a rehearsal guitarist. In 2007, he created his new band Affected and worked with Nine Inch Nails on their tour.

The band went on hiatus for three years. During this time, Kim Ljung created his solo project, Ljungblut, and recorded a double-CD with Dan Heide. Alex Møklebust did some producing for a few Norwegian bands (such as Gåte and Don Juan Dracula) and Erik Ljunggren has lent his programming skills to a number of other artists (Satyricon, Undergod) and began to study at a film school in Lillehammer. Seigmen also reunited for some concerts and recorded a live CD and DVD.

=== Sinners International, The Death of Romance and current events (2006–present) ===
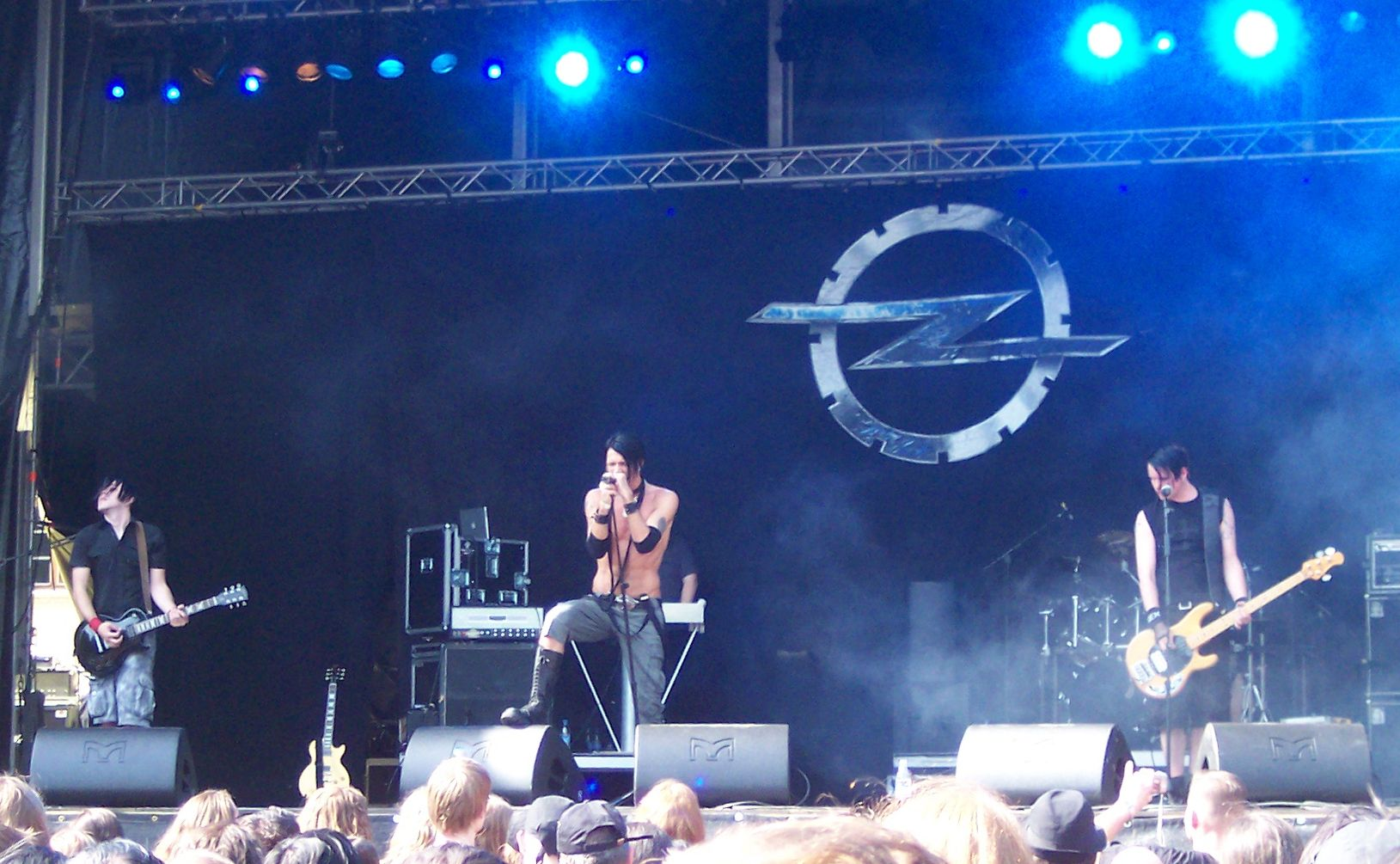
Zeromancer in 2008

Zeromancer returned in fall 2006 and began touring again. An early ten-track demo from the oval room was recorded. They released a single titled "Doppelgänger I Love You". It was played in Europe, peaking at number 4 on the Deutsche Alternative Charts. There was also a music video created for the song. It has since been leaked to the internet. The song is from an upcoming Zeromancer album called Sinners International. On 22 October 2007, Zeromancer released their second single, titled "I'm Yours to Lose", from their upcoming album; it was released on a CD single which includes a remix of "Doppelgänger I Love You".

In an interview with heavy-metal.de with Kim Ljung on 22 August 2007, Kim was asked about the new album:

Your last CD "ZZYZX" was softer than your preceding two albums. What can we expect from the new album "Sinners International"?

All albums of Zeromancer are different, because we are writing and recording the songs at different times. Our guiding principle is that we're never making over a song. There are many bands who do the same over and over again. We are always trying to change us, not at least to feel alive. I think the new album will sound differently than all three before. It will be like a combination of all CDs. Take the deeper meaning, put in all the things we liked and blend everything to something new. So, we hope to exceed the best.

Lorry Kristiansen replaced Erik on keyboards and programming.

A post on their official website, zeromancer.com, announced the release date for Sinners International as 13 February 2009, with a tour to follow in March.

The band released the It Sounds Like Love (But It Looks Like Sex) EP in October 2009. It contains remixes of tracks from Sinners International and of their Depeche Mode cover "Photographic".

Zeromancer released their fifth album, The Death of Romance, on 6 March 2010, releasing the track "Industrypeople" as the first single of the album. A video for the track was made though it was not released until 2012. They also released several videos for "Zeromancer TV" with touring updates.

After "The Death of Romance Tour" was done, Zeromancer almost immediately got back into the studio to work on their sixth album. On 25 January 2013, the band released Bye-Bye Borderline. A new single, "Underground", was released on their best-of album Something for the Pain, which was released 1 November 2013.

Their seventh studio album, Orchestra of Knives, was released 24 September 2021.

== Music ==
Zeromancer's music is largely industrial rock, similar to Celldweller, KMFDM, Die Krupps, Stabbing Westward, Oomph!, Orgy, Pitchshifter, and Rammstein. Elements of synthpop are in some of their work, with similarities to that of Depeche Mode.

== Band members ==
=== Current ===
- Alex Møklebust – vocals (1999–present)
- Kim Ljung – bass, backing vocals (1999–present)
- Noralf Ronthi – drums (1999–present)
- Lorry Kristiansen – keyboard, programming (2003–present)
- Per-Olav Wiik - guitar (2018–present)

=== Former ===
- Chris Schleyer – guitar (1999–2003)
- Erik Ljunggren – keyboard, programming (1999–2003)
- Dan Heide – guitar (2003–2018)

== Discography ==
=== Studio albums ===
Title	Details	Peak chart positions
Title	Details	NOR
Clone Your Lover	Release date: 13 March 2000; Label: Cleopatra; Formats: CD	7
Eurotrash	Release date: 1 October 2001; Label: Cleopatra; Formats: CD	21
Zzyzx	Release date: 1 September 2003; Label: Cleopatra; Formats: CD	18
Sinners International	Release date: 13 February 2009; Label: Cleopatra; Formats: CD	23
The Death of Romance	Release date: 6 March 2010; Label: Cleopatra; Formats: CD	34
Bye-Bye Borderline	Release date: 25 January 2013; Label: Trisol Music Group/Irond Records; Formats: CD	
Something for the Pain – Best of	Release date: 3 December 2013; Label: Trisol Music Group; Formats: CD	
Orchestra of Knives	Release date: 24 September 2021; Label: Trisol Music Group; Formats: CD	
"—" denotes releases that did not chart

=== Singles/EPs ===
- 2000: "Clone Your Lover"
- 2001: "Doctor Online"
- 2001: "Need You Like a Drug"
- 2003: "Famous Last Words"
- 2007: "Doppelgänger I Love You"
- 2007: "I'm Yours to Lose"
- 2009: It Sounds Like Love (But It Looks Like Sex) (EP)
- 2013: "The Underground"
- 2021: Damned le Monde (EP)
- 2021: "Mourners"
- 2021: "Terminal Love"

=== Music videos ===
- 2000: "Clone Your Lover"
- 2001: "Doctor Online"
- 2003: "Erotic Saints"
- 2007: "Doppelgänger I Love You"
- 2010: "Industrypeople"

== In other media ==
- An edited version of Zeromancer's song "Chrome Bitch" was used as part of the opening bumper for the syndicated radio program Loveline.
- "Flirt with me" was used in a Norwegian program called Singel 24-7 on TV3.
- "Dr. Online (Rico remix)" appears on the Graver's Paradise album, remixed by Rico Darum. Another version of "Dr. Online" appears on Non-Stop Ride, an industrial album compiled by the band Godhead.
- "Cupola" appears on Beauty in Darkness Vol. 6.

== Etymology ==
Zeromancer derived their name by combining the titles of the novels Less than Zero by Bret Easton Ellis and Neuromancer by William Gibson.
