= View from Stalheim =

1842 oil painting by Johan Christian Dahl

- Fra Stalheim (Norwegian)
- Artist: Johan Christian Dahl
- Year: 1842
- Medium: Oil on canvas
- Dimensions: 190 cm × 246 cm (75 in × 97 in)
- Location: National Gallery of Norway, Oslo
- Accession: NG.M.01060
- Website: digitaltmuseum.no/things/fra-stalheim-maleri/NMK-B/NG.M.01060

View from Stalheim (Norwegian: Fra Stalheim) is an 1842 oil painting by Johan Christian Dahl of the mountainous view from Stalheim in Voss Municipality in Søndre Bergenhus county. It is a major work of Romantic nationalism and has become a national icon. It is regarded as one of Dahl's best works.

== Description ==
The painting shows the view from the peak at Stalheim over the Nærøydalen valley towards the sugarloaf-shaped peak of Jordalsnuten in late afternoon sunshine, framed by peaks and a rainbow. The sun shines on a small village near the centre. Dahl has clearly delineated figures and buildings even in the distance, creating "a world in miniature". One of his purposes was realism; the other was to capture the glory and magnificence of the mountains, and associated with that, of his country's culture. In this evocation of grandeur the painting prefigures later US landscapes, in particular Church's Rainy Season in the Tropics (1866), which has a similar crowning rainbow. The rainbow itself, a symbol of reconciliation, peace, and in Christianity of God's grace, was also frequently used by Joseph Anton Koch and by Dahl's friend and associate Caspar David Friedrich.

== History ==
Dahl began work on the painting in 1836 and completed it in 1842. It is based on two pencil and watercolour sketches he had made from the Gudvangen road in July 1826 during his first visit to the high mountain regions of Norway. The final version is close to the studies in both composition and details, including the sunlight highlighting the village; but Dahl has intensified the imagery by narrowing the valley, giving more prominence to the Jordalsnuten peak and less to the reappearance of the river from the shadows.

Dahl had trouble with the painting and avoided similarly large works after its completion.

== Provenance ==
The painting was made for Countess Wedel of Bogstad. Carl Gustav Wedel-Jarlsberg gave it to the National Gallery of Norway in 1914.

== Reception ==
The painting is regarded as one of Dahl's best, perhaps his most successful realisation of his aim of depicting the mountains both realistically and as national symbols. It has become a national icon. Other painters have also depicted the scene, and even more than his other Norwegian landscapes, this one drove tourists to visit the site: the luxury hotel built at Stalheim in 1885 is attributable to it.
