= Eurotrash (album) =

Studio album by Zeromancer
- Released: 1 October 2001
- Genre: Industrial rock, industrial metal
- Length: 57:06
- Label: Cleopatra/Warner Music Group
- Producer: Zeromancer

Zeromancer chronology
Clone Your Lover (2000)	Eurotrash (2001)	Zzyzx (2003)

Eurotrash is the second studio album of the Norwegian industrial rock band Zeromancer.

The album spawned two singles, "Doctor Online" and "Need You Like a Drug", and a cover of Real Life's "Send Me an Angel". Need You Like a Drug hit number one on the Deutsche Alternative Charts in 2002.

== Track listing ==
1. "Doctor Online" - 3:18
2. "Eurotrash" - 4:06
3. "Need You Like a Drug" - 3:31
4. "Chromebitch" - 4:16
5. "Wannabe" - 3:48
6. "Neo Geisha" - 4:31
7. "Cupola" - 6:00
8. "Send Me an Angel" (Real Life cover) - 3:56
9. "Plasmatic" - 5:22
10. "Raising Hell" - 4:54
11. "Philharmonic" - 4:57
12. "Germany" - 8:16

All songs by Ljung, except "Send Me an Angel" (by David Sterry and Richard Zatorski).

== Personnel ==
- Alex Møklebust – vocals
- Kim Ljung – bass, backing vocals
- Noralf Ronthi – drums
- Chris Schleyer – guitar
- Erik Ljunggren – keyboard, programming
