= Vi vil oss et land =

Norwegian nationalist slogan

Vi vil oss et land som er frelst og fritt
og ikke sin frihet må borge.
Vi vil oss et land som er mitt og ditt,
og dette vårt land heter Norge!
Og har vi ikke det land ennu,
så skal vi vinne det, jeg og du!

— Per Sivle, 1895
(modernized language)

"Vi vil oss et land" (lit. 'We Want Ourselves a Country') is a famous phrase in the context of Norwegian nationalism, derived from a poem by Per Sivle. It has been evoked by many different groups, including during the occupation of Norway by Nazi Germany, when an arrest order was issued on the deceased Sivle.

== Original use ==
It is taken from a poem by Per Sivle (1857–1904) issued in 1895, ten years before Norway gained its independence. Sivle's poem, titled "Vi vil os et Land -", was published in the poetry collection Bersøglis- og andre Viser from 1895. It was originally written as the last verse of the occasional poem "Her spirer i Norge", written for a procession in support of universal male suffrage organized by Kristiania Liberal Party in 1894.

== Later use ==
The phrase has been evoked by several very different groups who have appealed to Norwegian nationalism. It was praised as a "delightful poem of liberty" in the Communist Party of Norway newspaper Norges Kommunistblad in 1925, and the far-right Fatherland Party opened the 1997 election manifesto with a part of the poem. The poem lent its name to a 1936 film, which agitated for the Conservative Party ahead of the 1936 election. The opening words of the poem are reportedly written on the tombstone of Liberal Party politician Johannes Steen, and are also engraved in a portal on an avenue leading to the Eidsvoll Building, where the nationalist-symbolic Constitution of Norway was drafted and signed.

During the occupation of Norway by Nazi Germany, Vi vil oss et land was the name of one of the first anti-Nazi illegal newspapers, written among others by Olav Gjærevoll, Gunnar Sønsteby and Max Manus. A rendition of the poem was staged in 1940 by theatre director Henry Gleditsch, who ended up being killed by the Nazis. In 1942 the poem was printed in an illegal newspaper based in Bergen. It was signed with Per Sivle's name, resulting in the Gestapo issuing an arrest order for the long-dead Sivle.
