= The Death of Romance =

Studio album by Zeromancer
- Released: 6 March 2010
- Genre: Industrial rock

Zeromancer chronology
| Sinners International (2009) | The Death of Romance (2010) | Bye-Bye Borderline (2013) |

The Death of Romance is the fifth album by Norwegian industrial rock quintet Zeromancer. Released just a year after their previous album Sinners International, the electronic sounds prevail on this album rather than the heavy guitar sounding of Sinners. It is their second album released through the Trisol Music Group.

A video for the track "Industrypeople" was shot.

Alex of Metal.de rated the album a 7 out of 10, writing that it “should appeal to both their fans and a wider audience.”

== Track listing ==
1. "2.6.25"
2. "Industrypeople"
3. "The Hate Alphabet"
4. "The Death of Romance"
5. "The Pygmalion Effect"
6. "Murder Sound"
7. "Revengefuck"
8. "Virgin Ring"
9. "The Plinth"
10. "Mint"
11. "V"
