= Bye-Bye Borderline =

Studio album by Zeromancer
- Released: 25 January 2013
- Genre: Industrial rock
- Label: Trisol Music Group/Irond Records
- Producer: Zeromancer

Zeromancer chronology
The Death of Romance (2010)	Bye-Bye Borderline (2013)

Bye-Bye Borderline is the sixth studio album by Norwegian industrial rock band Zeromancer. It was released on 25 January 2013.

== Track listing ==
1. Auf Wiedersehen Boy (3:30)
2. Bye-Bye Borderline (4:19)
3. LCYD (4:07)
4. You Meet People Twice (3:42)
5. Manoeuvres (3:45)
6. Weakness (3:46)
7. Lace and Armour (3:09)
8. Montreal (5:12)
9. Ash Wednesday (4:44)
10. The Tortured Artist (4:18)

== Personnel ==
- Alex Møklebust - vocals
- Kim Ljung - bass
- Noralf Ronthi - drums
- Dan Heide - guitar
- Lorry Kristiansen - keyboards, programming

== Release details ==
Special Russian edition of this album was released in Russia via Irond Records label. This version has received an alternative cover-art. "Our Russian fans are amongst our most dedicated. Now we are extremely happy to announce that we are back with IronD records and releasing Bye-Bye Borderline in Russia. Like with our other releases the cover will have another look." - the band wrote on their official website.
