= Seigmen =

Norwegian rock band

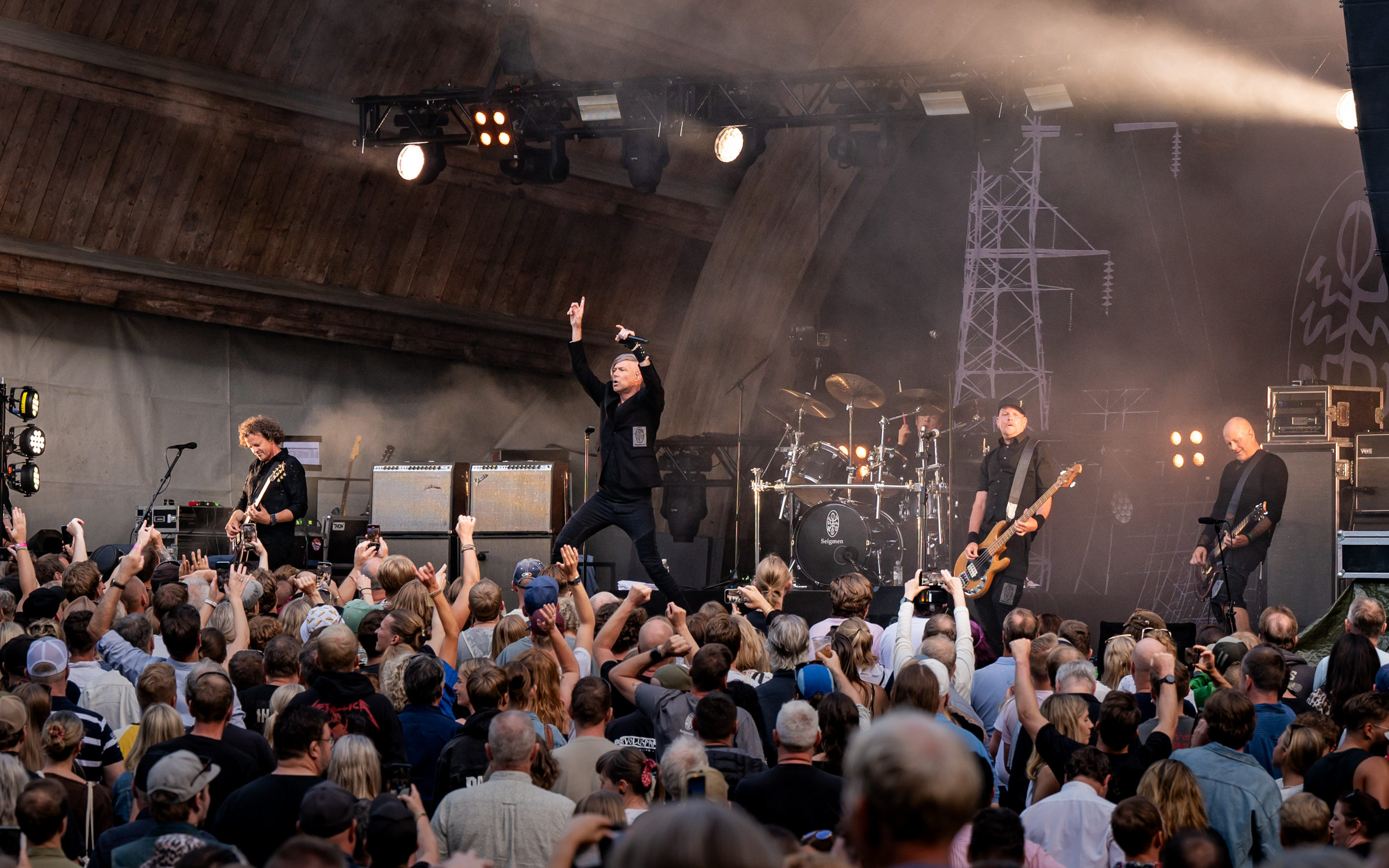
- Seigmen at Ravnedalen Live 2024

Background information
- Also known as: Klisne Seigmenn
- Origin: Tønsberg, Norway
- Genres: Alternative rock; gothic rock; alternative metal; industrial rock
- Years active: 1989–1999, 2005–2006, 2008, 2012–present
- Label: Sony BMG Norway
- Spinoffs: Zeromancer
- Members: Alex Møklebust; Sverre Økshoff; Marius Roth; Kim Ljung; Noralf Ronthi

The Seigmen logo was drawn by Kim Ljung, inspired by the scorpion necklace that fellow band member Alex Møklebust wears. Supposedly, it has no symbolic meaning.

Seigmen is a Norwegian rock band formed in 1989 in Tønsberg. Originally named Klisne Seigmenn, the band came into prominence in the early 1990s. The band's name is derived from Norwegian sweets brand Laban Seigmenn. The band went from a hard-edged grunge-like style to a more dynamic sound with more ambient parts and use of synthesizers and various audio-effects.

== History ==
The band was formed in Tønsberg in 1989 by vocalist and guitarist Alex Møklebust and guitarist Sverre Økshoff under the name Klisne Seigmenn and played their first gig at the “Julerock” (“Christmas rock”) event in Tønsberg on December 27, 1989. In 1990, guitarist Marius Roth Christensen, bassist Kim Ljung and drummer Noralf Ronthi joined the band. Following several studio albums, including two with American producer Sylvia Massy recorded in Los Angeles, the band announced that they would split up after a farewell tour in 1999. Møklebust, Ljung and Ronthi formed the new band Zeromancer in January 2000.

Seigmen reunited during the UKA-festival in Trondheim on October 20, 2005, and decided in November 2005 to do more reunion shows in Norway, performing seven shows in February 2006. Following the successful reunion tour, the band did six more shows at various festivals across Norway during summer 2006, mostly as the headlining act. Media reports that summer said that Seigmen did not rule out another reunion some time in the future. In early 2008, it was announced that Seigmen would again play live, which they did on June 21 the Oslo Opera House, as one of the shows celebrating the opening of the new Opera House in Oslo. Selling out the show quickly, a second concert was set up the day after. In 2013, they contributed to the book Think like a Rockstar by Ståle Økland. Seigmen released a new album Enola in 2015.

== Members ==
- Alex Møklebust – lead vocals (1989–present), guitar (1989–1990)
- Sverre Økshoff – guitar (1989–present)
- Marius Roth Christensen – guitar, vocals (1990–present)
- Kim Ljung – bass guitar, vocals (1990–present)
- Noralf Ronthi – drums, percussion (1990–present)

== Discography ==
=== Albums ===
- Ameneon (1993)
- Total (1994) Norway #19
- Metropolis (1995) Norway #1
- Metropolis - The Grandmaster Recordings (English language version of Metropolis) (1996) Norway #11
- Radio Waves (1997) Norway #1
- Enola (2015)
- Resonans (2024)
- Dissonans (2025)
- Substans (2026)

=== Singles/EPs ===
- Pluto (1992)
- "Monsun" (1993)
- "Hjernen er alene" (1994) Norway #5
- "Döderlein" (1994) Norway #14
- "Lament" (1994)
- "Metropolis" (1995) Norway #4
- "Slaver av solen" (1995) Norway #3
- "The First Wave" (1997) Norway #12
- "The Next Wave" (1997)
- "The Opera For The Crying Machinery" (1997) [Rare and never released]
- "Mørkets øy" (1997)
- "Döderlein" (2006) (single from the live album Rockefeller)

=== Demos ===
- Det finnes alltid en utvei.... (1990) [Cassette tape - only 45 copies]

=== DVDs ===
- Rockefeller (live reunion album) (2006) Norway #8
- Fra X til døden (2006) [Concert DVD recorded at UKA-05, in Dødens dal, Trondheim]
- Seigmen - Seigmen I Operaen 2008 (2012) [Concert DVD *LTD - Signed by the band - Only a limited number of copies]

=== Compilations ===
- Monument (1999) Norway #11

Awards
Preceded by No Rock award	Recipient of the Rock Spellemannprisen; 1995	Succeeded by Motorpsycho
