= UKA (festival) =

Students culture festival in Trondheim, Norway

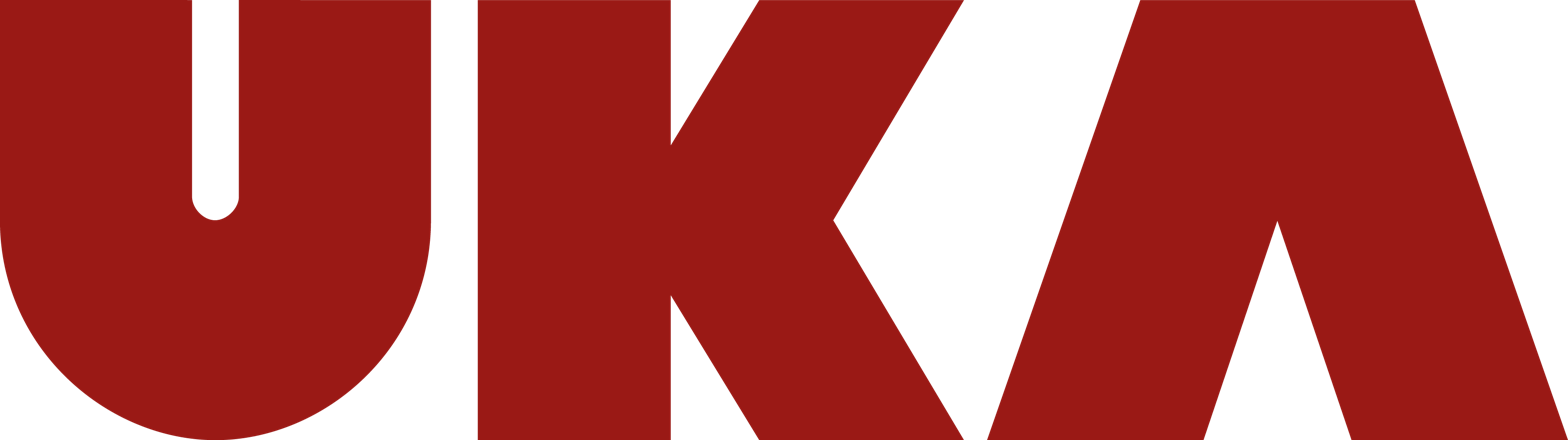
- Dates: Bi-annually in October
- Locations: Trondheim, Norway
- Years active: 1917 – present
- Website: UKA.no

UKA is the largest cultural festival in Norway and is held biannually by volunteer students from Trondheim. In 2027, the festival is set to be held for the 54th time. In 2023, 2000 students did volunteer work, while over 100,000 tickets were sold.. The name "UKA" translates to "the week" and was initially a week long, although it now lasts for the better part of a month, with events including concerts, theatre, seminars, sports events and more.

== History ==
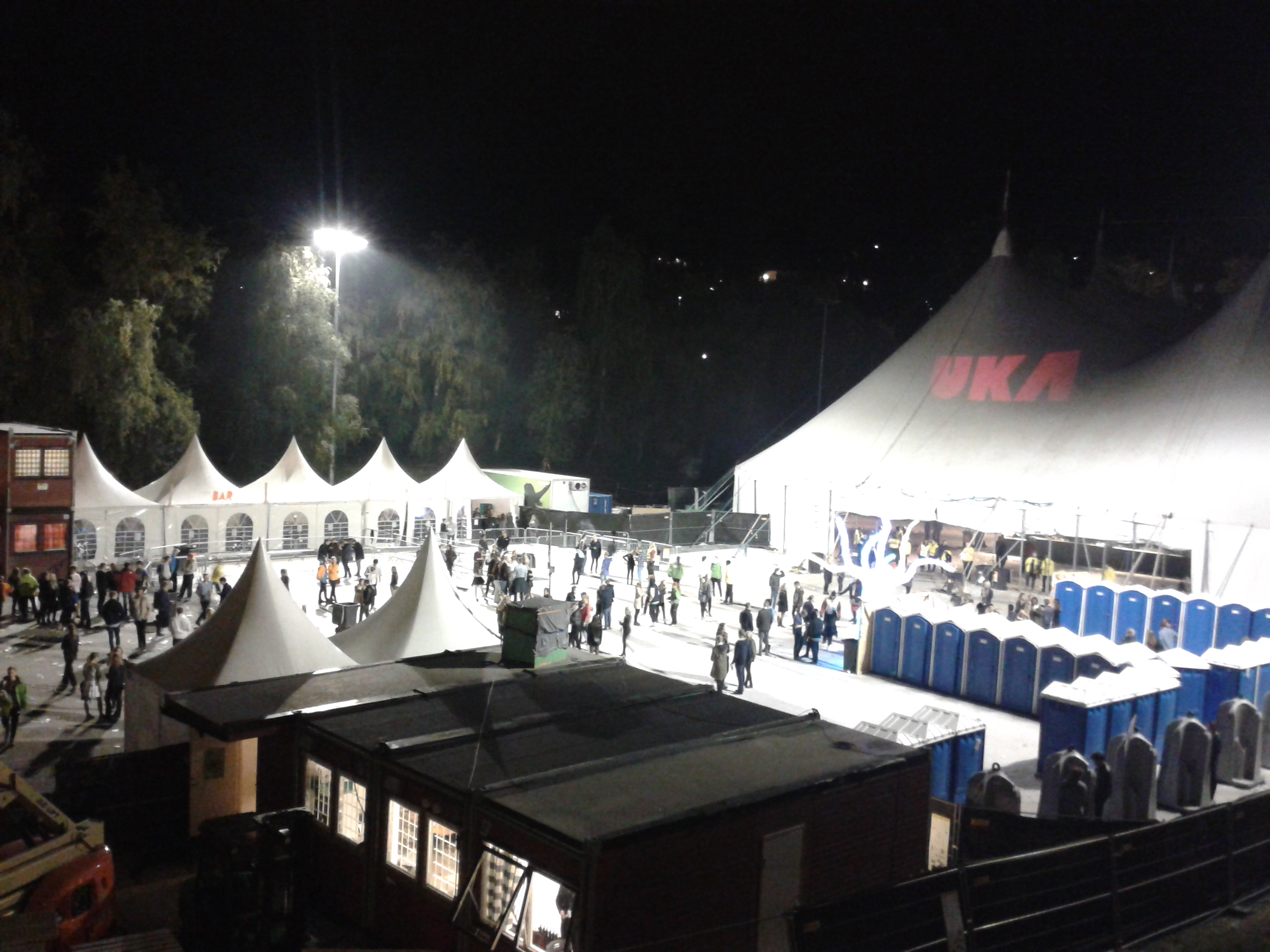
Festival area of UKA 2015

UKA was established in 1917 by students studying at the Norwegian Institute of Technology (NTH, now part of NTNU) in an attempt to improve the financial situation within the Student Society in Trondheim. In 1917, the festival mainly consisted of a revue, which was arranged every other year except the mid-war years. Starting with scarce resources, UKA has been in constant growth and is today the largest Norwegian cultural festival with more concerts and entertainment than ever before. Although the festival now features big-name artists, the organizers still consider revue, UKErevyen, as the "heart" of the festival.

== Volunteer work ==
UKA is run entirely by volunteers. In 2009, 1400 volunteers participated in organizing the event. 6500 spectators jumped up and down in Death Valley, 90,000 litres of beer were sold during the festival, activities spanning from juggling courses to crime night to wrestling were held in Death Valley and The Student Society in Trondheim, and commercial partners contributed with events like “UKA robot challenge”, where the contesters competed in building and programming Lego robots. The festival itself is a celebration of intellectual prowess and passionate commitment shown by the students. Consisting mainly of students recruited from Trondheim, the main audience is young people within the proximity of the city. There are events and lectures, however, that targets a more mature audience, such as UKErevyen.

== Names ==
Every UKErevyen revue is given a name, which becomes the name of the entire festival. The name is decided by the writers and is undisclosed all the way up to the opening of the festival and the play, with few people outside of the writers' collegium informed it before the official reveal. There is an event where the name is physically uncovered at midnight in front of the student society, with several thousand attendants.

The writers aren't entirely free in choosing the name, either. A more or less strict set of rules applies, never written down, but followed from one festival to the next. The most important ones are that the name should consist of three syllables, and that it should have several meanings, either in splitting up the word(s) or rearranging the letters. The rules aren't always followed, as seen with the name of UKA-03 and UKA-23; Glasur, that had only two syllables. It did, however, supply different interpretations, first of all with the word itself, meaning glaze, then "Gla' sur" which means "happy sad", and "gla'rus" (a rush of happiness). UKA-05 restored the rule of three syllables (until 2023) with the name Origo.

=== List of names ===
- 2027, -
- 2025, Chærrity
- 2023, SPRÆKK!
- 2021, Razzmatazz
- 2019, Vivillé
- 2017, Ta-De-Du!
- 2015, LURIFAX
- 2013, Jubalong
- 2011, Imiti
- 2009, Skabaré
- 2007, Manifest
- 2005, Origo
- 2003, Glasur
- 2001, Paradoks
- 1999, ,kåMMa,
- 1997, Alt er sex
- 1995, skjer-mer-@
- 1993, Fabula
- 1991, bom-t-bom
- 1989, jaggumæ
- 1987, De-cha-vi
- 1985, Narr i ciss
- 1983, E' de' ber
- 1981, Fan-tutte
- 1979, Ræggeti
- 1977, Laugalaga
- 1975, Sirkuss
- 1973, Skubidi
- 1971, Åja
- 1969, prinkipo
- 1967, Jarragakk
- 1965, ..jo,serdu...
- 1963, kiss mett
- 1961, filliputt
- 1959, Krakatitt
- 1957, Krusedull
- 1955, VAU-De-Ville
- 1953, GUST i BUS
- 1951, akk-a-mei
- 1949, Domino
- 1947, Fandango
- 1945, Go-a-head
- 1939, Tempora
- 1937, Vær-i-tass
- 1935, Dek-e-du
- 1933, NÆMESiS (Nemesis)
- 1931, mammon ra
- 1929, Cassa rossa
- 1927, Merry go round
- 1925, BiNG BANG
- 1923, Charivari
- 1921, Rah-ta-tah
- 1919, Jazz
- 1917, Baccarat

== Headliners ==
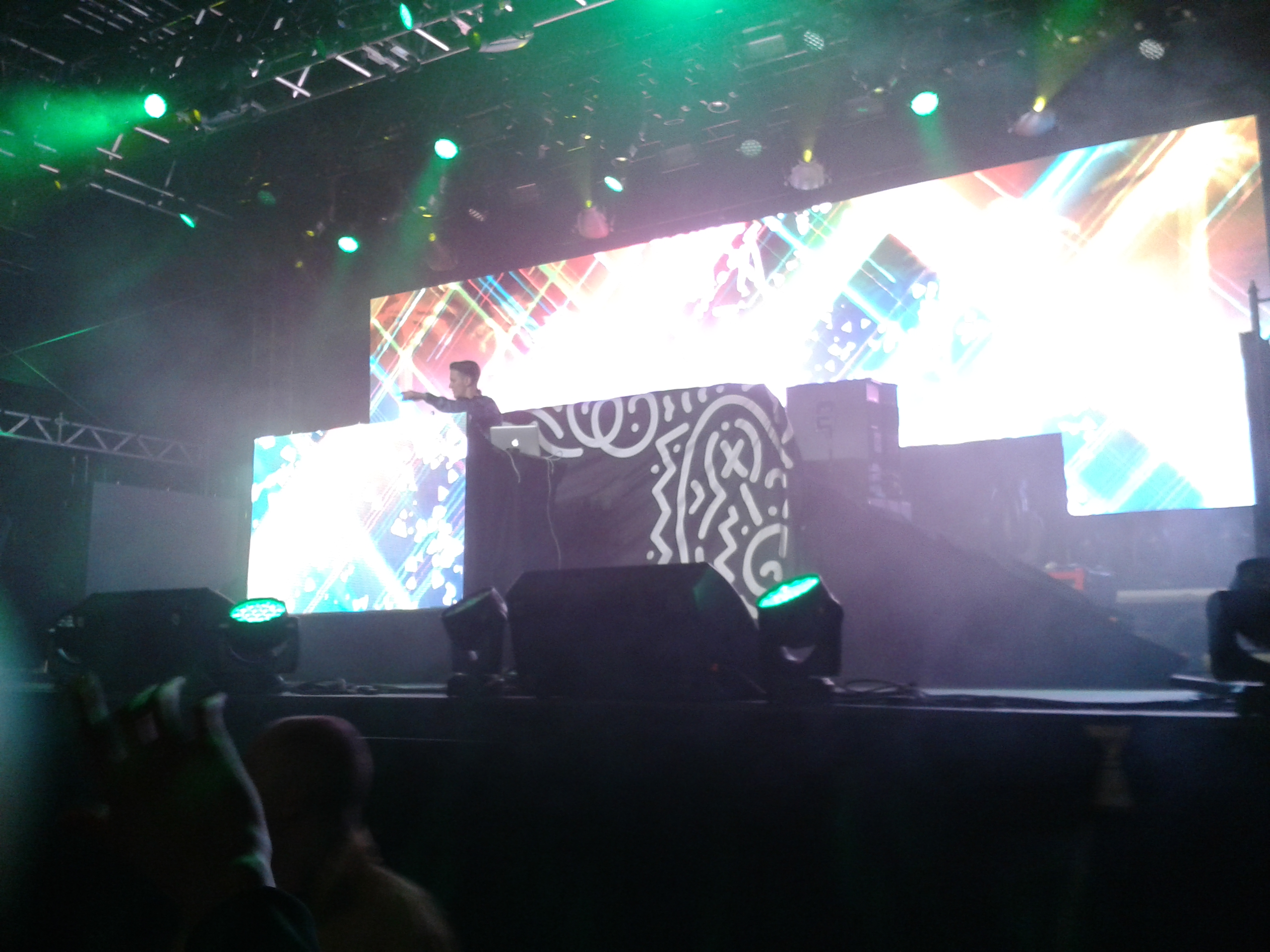
Matoma on the UKA 2015

UKA-23:

- 50 Cent
- Astrid S
- Ruben
- Arif and Stig Brenner

UKA-17:

- Martin Garrix
- Future
- Highasakite
- Lorde
- Cashmere Cat

UKA-15:

- The Prodigy
- Major Lazer + Matoma
- Wiz Khalifa + A$ap Rocky
- Mew
- Diplo
- Lemaitre
- Kings Of Convenience
- Kakkmaddafakka

UKA-13:

- Calvin Harris
- The National + The Tallest Man On Earth
- Macklemore & Ryan Lewis
- Röyksopp + Susanne Sundfør (+ special guest: Robyn)
- Mac Miller
- Kavinsky

UKA-11:

- David Guetta
- Snoop Dogg
- Robyn
- Antony and The Johnsons
- White Lies
- Crystal Fighters

UKA-09:

- Jay-Z
- Franz Ferdinand
- Aqua
- The Eagles of Death Metal

UKA-07

- Muse
- Pussycat Dolls
- Travis
- Kings of Convenience

UKA-05

- The Dandy Warhols
- De La Soul
- Kaizers Orchestra
- Seigmen
- Tom McRae
- Wyclef Jean
- Chippendales

Former UKA festivals have included:

- 50 Cent
- a-ha
- The Cardigans
- Dum Dum Boys
- Public Enemy
- Turbonegro
- The Prodigy
- Oktoberfest

== See also ==
- Studentersamfundet i Trondhjem
- Norwegian University of Science and Technology
- The International Student Festival in Trondheim
