= Pål Gerhard Olsen =

Norwegian author (born 1959)

- Born: 1 November 1959; Bergen, Norway
- Occupation(s): novelist and crime fiction writer

Pål Gerhard Olsen (born 1 November 1959) is a Norwegian novelist, children's writer, crime fiction writer, playwright and literary critic.

== Career ==
Olsen was born in Bergen. He made his literary debut in 1985, with Svart, svart – og et tynt lag hvitt, on disillusioned and whisky-consuming youngsters. Further novels are Libero. Loven vest for Geilo (1986), about two football-loving young boys, Den eneste andre (1989), where the protagonists are two vagants, and the sequel Blodets sang from 1991. The 1994 novel Den sanne historien combines social and psychological aspects of the 1990s. The novel Manndomsprøven (1997) is about a maturing young boy, while Fredstid (2000) is a love story set in the late 1930s. In the crime fiction novel Mørk april from 1987, Olsen introduced private investigator "Aron Ask", a former freelance journalist, who eventually appeared in a number of novels, including the sequels Overspill (1990), Rødt regn (1992) and Isdronningen (1995), as well as in Oslo-piken (1998), Tusenårsriket (2002), Nattmusikk (2005) and Bakmennene (2009). His children's novels include Tigrene tar avspark from 1996, and Tigrene finner formen from 1997.

Olsen is a literary critic of crime fiction for the newspaper Aftenposten.
