= Lars Sørgard =

Norwegian economist and civil servant (born 1959)

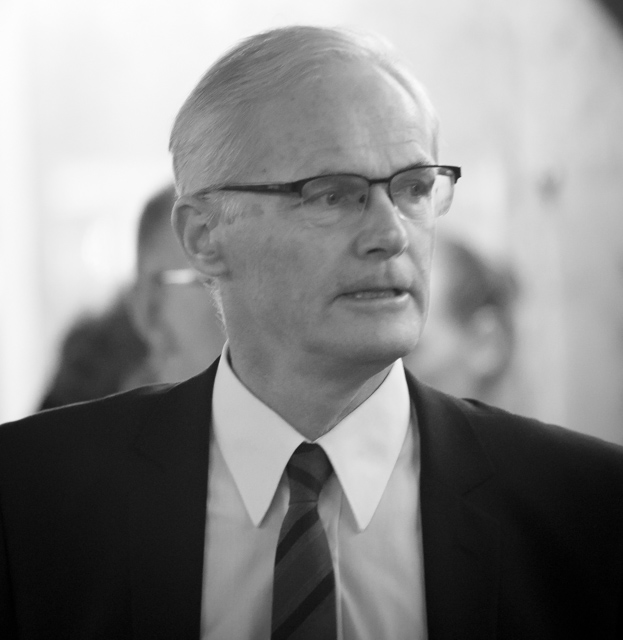
- Lars Sørgard in 2017
- Born: 28 November 1959 (age 66)
- Occupations: economist and civil servant

Lars Sørgard (born 28 November 1959) is a Norwegian economist and civil servant.

He was appointed professor at the Norwegian School of Economics from 1998 to 2004 and from 2007 to 2015. He was appointed director of the Norwegian Competition Authority from 2016.

Government offices
Preceded by Magnus Gabrielsen (acting)	Director of the Norwegian Competition Authority; 2016–present	Incumbent
