= Per Sivle =

Norwegian poet, novelist, editor

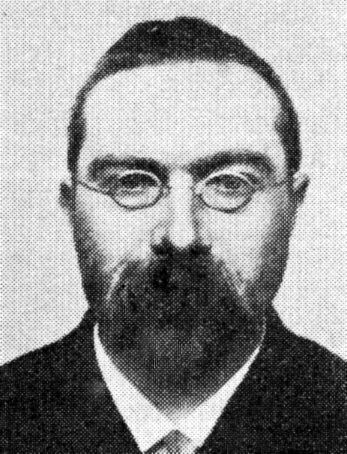
- Born: 6 April 1857; Flåm, Norway
- Died: 6 September 1904 (aged 47); Kristiania
- Occupations: Poet; Novelist; Newspaper editor
- Notable work: "Vi vil os et Land" (1894); Bersøglis- og andre Viser (1895)

Per Sivle (6 April 1857 – 6 September 1904) was a Norwegian poet, novelist and newspaper editor. He is known for his novel Streik from 1891, and for his collections of stories issued between 1887 and 1895, Sogor (includes the story "Berre ein Hund"), Vossa-Stubba, Nye Vossa-stubbar and Sivle-Stubbar. Among his poetry collections is Bersøglis- og andre Viser from 1895.

== Life and career ==
Per Eriksen Sivle was born in Flåm as the son of farmer and horse trader Eirik Hansson Sivle and Susanna Andersdotter Ryum. He was the only living child of twins of which his mother bore two more sets, both of which died. His parents were not married, and his mother died in 1859, when he was only two years old. During his childhood he frequently moved from place to place, growing up along with different relatives. He attended a folk high school in Sogndal when he was 15 years old. In 1875, he moved to Christiania for studies, planning to become a priest. Because of illness these plans were abandoned and he aborted his studies. He then started a literary career. He made his literary debut in 1878 with the book En digters drøm, published under the pen name Simon de Vita. He was editor for the newspaper Buskeruds Amtstidende from 1883 to 1885. In 1885 he attended Askov Højskole in Denmark. Here he met his future wife, and he married Wenche von der Lippe Nilsen in 1887. From 1887 to 1891 he edited the newspaper Kristianiaposten. His literary breakthrough was the collection of five stories Sogor from 1887. This book also included the story "Berre ein hund", which had been published in the literary and cultural magazine Nyt Tidsskrift in 1885. The story "Berre en hund" was later adapted into a film. In 1887 he also published Vossa-Stubba, a collection of stories written in dialect. His novel Streik from 1891, based on a conflict in Drammen in 1881, is one of the first workers' novels in Norwegian literature. In 1894 he published the poetry collection Noreg, and also the story collection Nye Vossa-Stubbar. His poem "Vi vil os et Land" from 1894, included in the poetry collection Bersøglis- og andre Viser from 1895, became a popular song with a melody composed by Christian Sinding. Literary historian Kristian Elster characterized Bersøglis- og andre Viser as Sivle's most outstanding poetry collection. His story collection Sivle-Stubbar was published in 1895, the poetry collections Skaldemaal in 1896 and En Fyrstikke og andre Viser in 1898, and the stories Folk og Fæ in 1898. His last poetry collection was Olavs-Kvæde from 1901. Two of his songs that have found their way into songbooks are "Lerka" (from Skaldemaal) and "Den fyrste song".

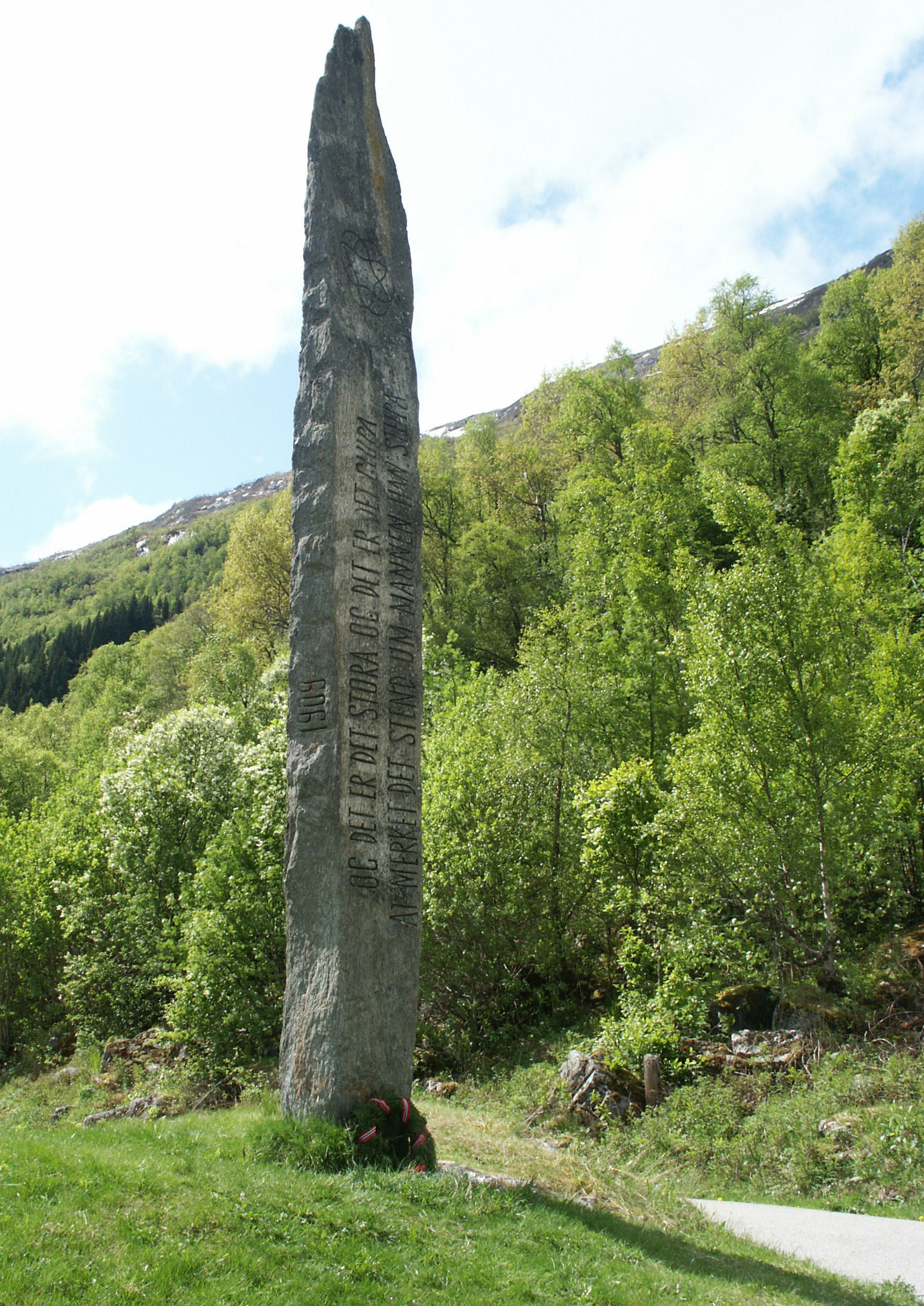
Per Sivle memorial stone

Sivle suffered from various personal problems during his life, including nerve troubles, alcohol abuse and financial straits. He shot himself in a public bath in Oslo in 1904. Commemorative monuments to Sivle exist in Flåm, Stalheim, along the very steep, zig zag road to Gudvangen, (just beneath the Stalheim Hotel & near to the family home), two in Vossevangen, one in Strømsgodset and one in Elverum.
