= Nils Jakob Hunstad =

Norwegian military officer (1895 – 1978)

Nils Jakob Hunstad (18 January 1895 – 24 November 1978) was a Norwegian sportsperson, businessesman, politician and military officer. He was born in Harstad.

From 1925 to 1940, he was business manager for the newspaper company, Harstad Tidende, and served as Mayor of Harstad from 1932 to 1934 and from 1938 to 1940.

He commanded an infantry battalion (of the Troms regiment) during the Narvik Campaign of World War II and his war decorations included the St. Olav's Medal with Oak Branch. From 1951 to 1952, he headed the Independent Norwegian Brigade Group in Germany. He served as head of DK Vestlandet from 1953, with the rank of Major General, and head of DK Trøndelag from 1955 to 1960.
