= Frieda Dalen =

Norwegian teacher and organizational leader (1895–1995)

- Born: 13 September 1895; Skedsmo, Norway
- Died: 15 February 1995 (aged 99)
- Occupations: Teacher and organizational leader
- Awards: King's Medal of Merit (1965)

Frieda Dalen (13 December 1895 – 15 February 1995) was a Norwegian teacher and organizational leader. In 1946, she was a delegate to the first United Nations General Assembly at London and became the first woman to ever address the General Assembly.

== Biography ==
Alfrieda Kristine Jensen was born at Skedsmo in Akershus, Norway. She was the daughter of Carl Jensen (1869-1954) and Ada Emilie Andersson (1872-1957). She attended school in Kristiania (now Oslo). In 1916 she graduated from the teachers college (Oslo lærerskole). In 1936 she completed a course of study at the University of Vienna. She later assisted psychologist professor Charlotte Bühler who held a professorship at the University of Oslo (1938–40).

She was associated with Sagene School (1936–46). During the occupation of Norway by Nazi Germany she played a leading role in the teachers' civil resistance, representing teachers in the Coordination Committee of the Norwegian resistance movement. For her resistance activities, she was arrested with a short stay in Oslo Prison.

From 1946 until 1965, she worked at Rosenhof skole under headmistress Anna Sethne, co-founder of the Norwegian Teacher Association (Norges Lærerinneforbund). Dalen served as chair of the Norwegian Teacher Association 1946–55. She was also a delegate to the first United Nations General Assembly at London in 1946, and was a member of UNESCO committees from 1946 to 1958.

== Personal life ==
In 1939 she married Olaf Dalen (1896-1965) who was the son of Hans Olsen Dalen (1860-1936) and Mari Johannesdatter (1867-1944). In 1965, Frieda Dalen was awarded the King's Medal of Merit (Kongens fortjenstmedalje) in gold. She died during 1995 and was buried at Vår Frelsers gravlund in Oslo.
