= Bersøglis- og andre Viser =

Poetry collection by Per Sivle

Bersøglis- og andre Viser is a poetry collection published by Norwegian poet Per Sivle in 1895. Among its poems are "Vaar-Von", "Vi vil os et Land -" and "Haust". Literary historian Kristian Elster characterized Bersøglis- og andre Viser as Sivle's most outstanding poetry collection.
