= Sigvald Svendsen =

Norwegian politician

Sigvald Svendsen (3 October 1895 – 31 January 1956) was a Norwegian politician for the Liberal Party.

== Biography ==
He served as a deputy representative to the Norwegian Parliament from Vest-Agder during the term 1950–1953 and 1954–1957. He died shortly before the end of the second term.
