= Ingvarda Røberg =

Norwegian politician

Ingvarda Røberg (5 June 1895 – 25 August 1990) was a Norwegian politician for the Labour Party.

She served as a deputy representative to the Norwegian Parliament from Bergen during the term 1958–1961.
