= Ola Fritzner =

Norwegian military officer

Ola Fritzner (26 July 1895 – 11 November 1983) was a Norwegian military officer. He was born in Vennesla. He served as a leading police officer during World War II, while also having contacts to leaders of the Norwegian resistance movement.

He was decorated Knight of the Order of Dannebrog, and of the Order of the Sword.
