= Ragnhild Noer =

Norwegian judge (born 1959)

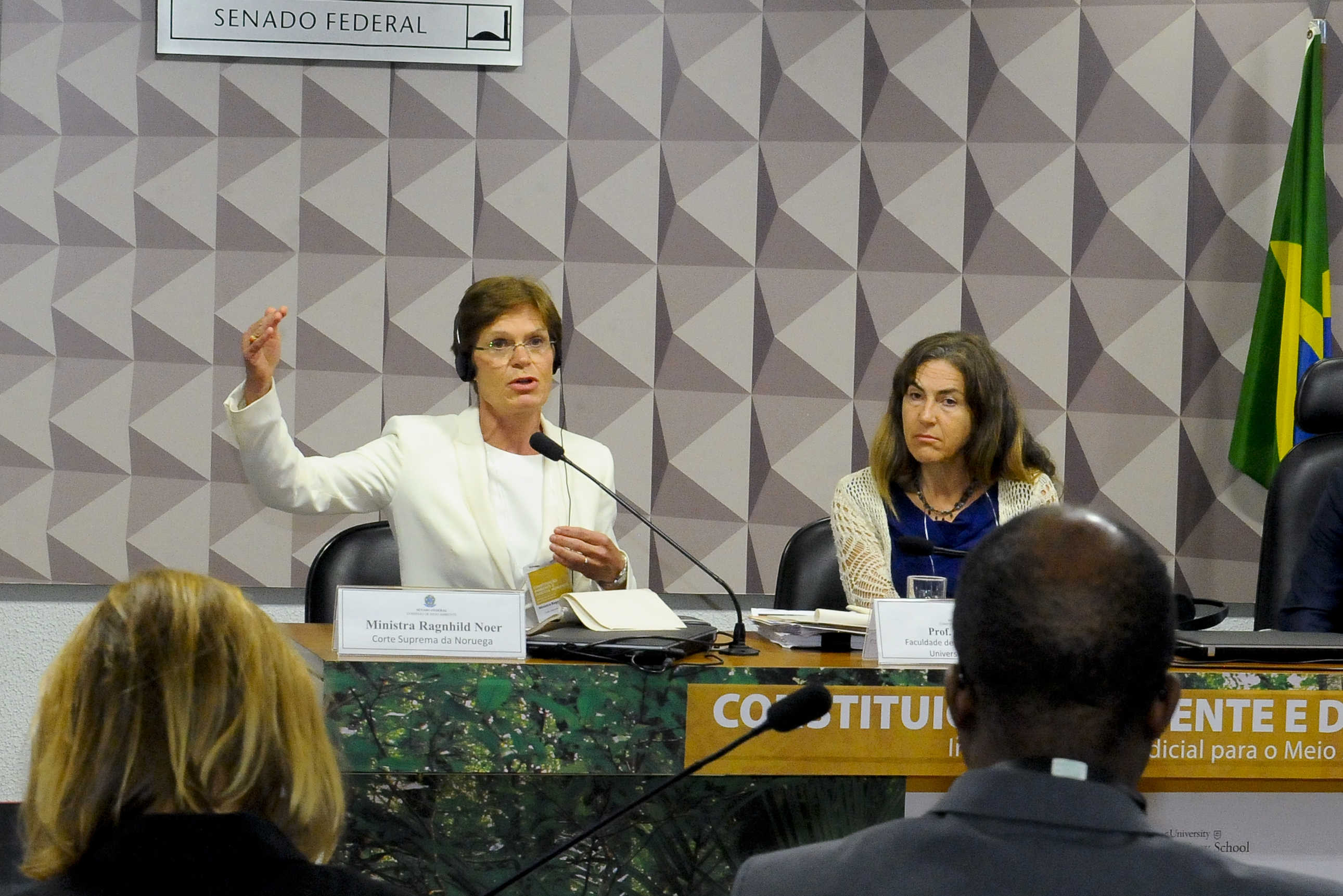
- Ragnhild Noer in 2017 (left)
- Born: 28 December 1959 (age 65); Oslo, Norway
- Occupation: Judge

Ragnhild Noer (born 28 December 1959) is a Norwegian judge. She has been a Supreme Court Justice since 2010.

== Life and career ==
Noer was born in Oslo on 28 December 1959.

In her youth she was an active member of the envioronmental organizations Norwegian Society for the Conservation of Nature and Nature and Youth.

She graduated in jurisprudence in 1985. From 1985 to 1987 she worked for the Ministry of Justice and Public Security. From 1987 to 1989 she was assistant judge and acting stipendiary magistrate at the Lyngen district court. She lectured at the University of Tromsø from 1989, and worked for NRK Troms from 1990 to 1991. From 1991 to 2005 she was attorney at the Office of the Attorney General of Norway.

She worked as a presiding judge in Borgarting from 2005 to 2010, and as Supreme Court Justice from 2010.
