= Laban Seigmenn =

Brand of sweets

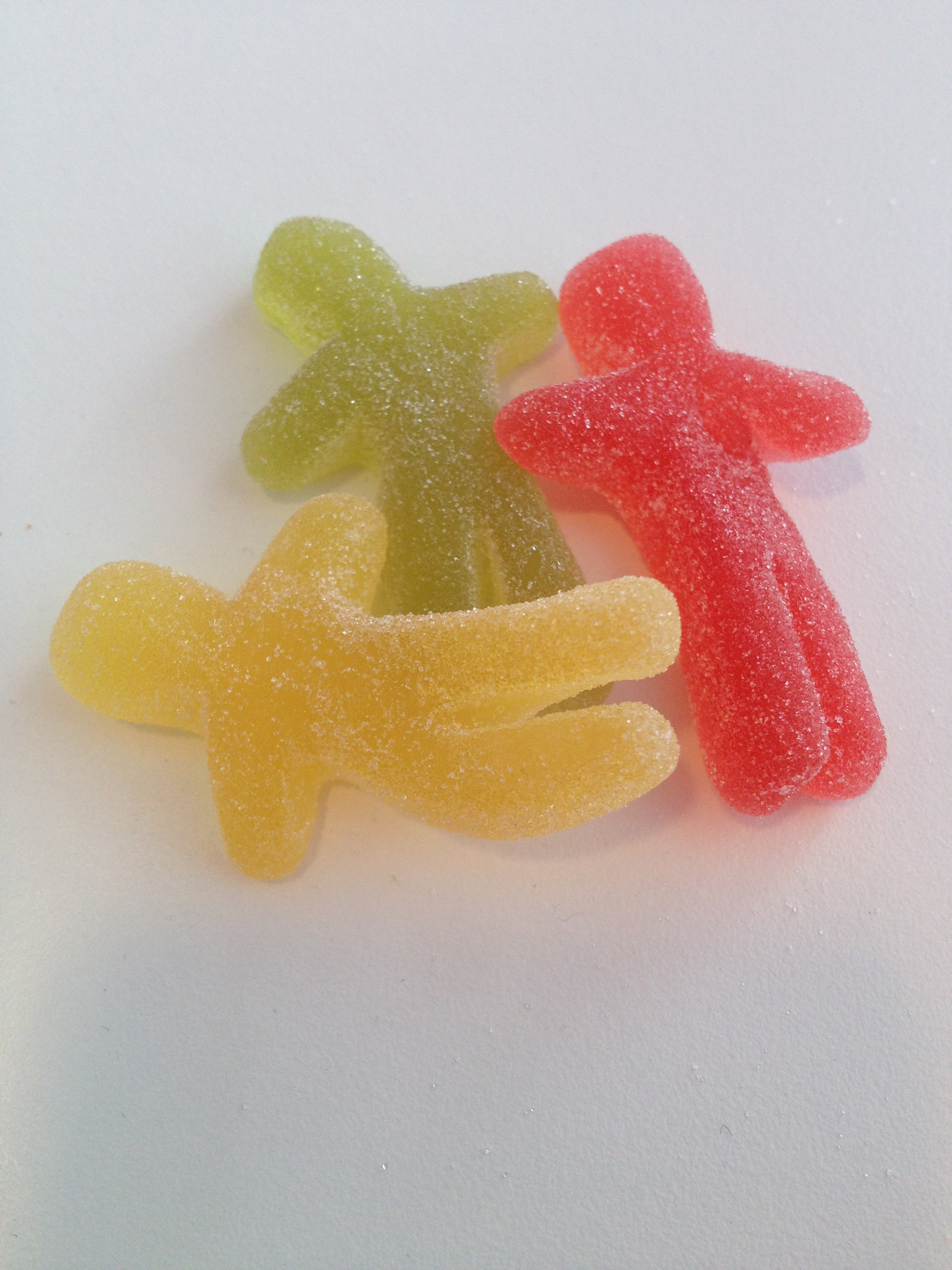
Laban Seigmenn.

Laban Seigmenn is a brand of sweets produced for the Norwegian market.

== About ==
Laban is a jellyman, which is one of the stretchy gummy candies that looks like an overly plump stick figure. This candy is made by Nidar AS since 1965. It was introduced to the Indian market in 2017, the first time the brand was exported outside Norway.
