= Hans Kristian Hansson =

Norwegian jurist and civil servant

Hans Kristian Hansson (1895–1958) was a Norwegian jurist and civil servant.

He was born in Brunlanes Municipality. He graduated with the cand.jur. degree, and in 1929 he was hired as a head of department in the Ministry of Justice and the Police. From the same year he was a lecturer of theology at the University of Oslo. In 1945 he was promoted to deputy under-secretary of State in the Ministry of Education and Church Affairs. He issued several books regarding the church and law, including Norsk kirkerett (1935), Stat og kirke (1945) and Den kristne og retten (1946).
