= Nils Asheim =

Norwegian politician

Nils Asheim (17 December 1895 – 26 August 1966) was a Norwegian politician for the Liberal Party.

He served as a deputy representative to the Norwegian Parliament from Oppland during the term 1945–1949.
