= Kim Ljung =

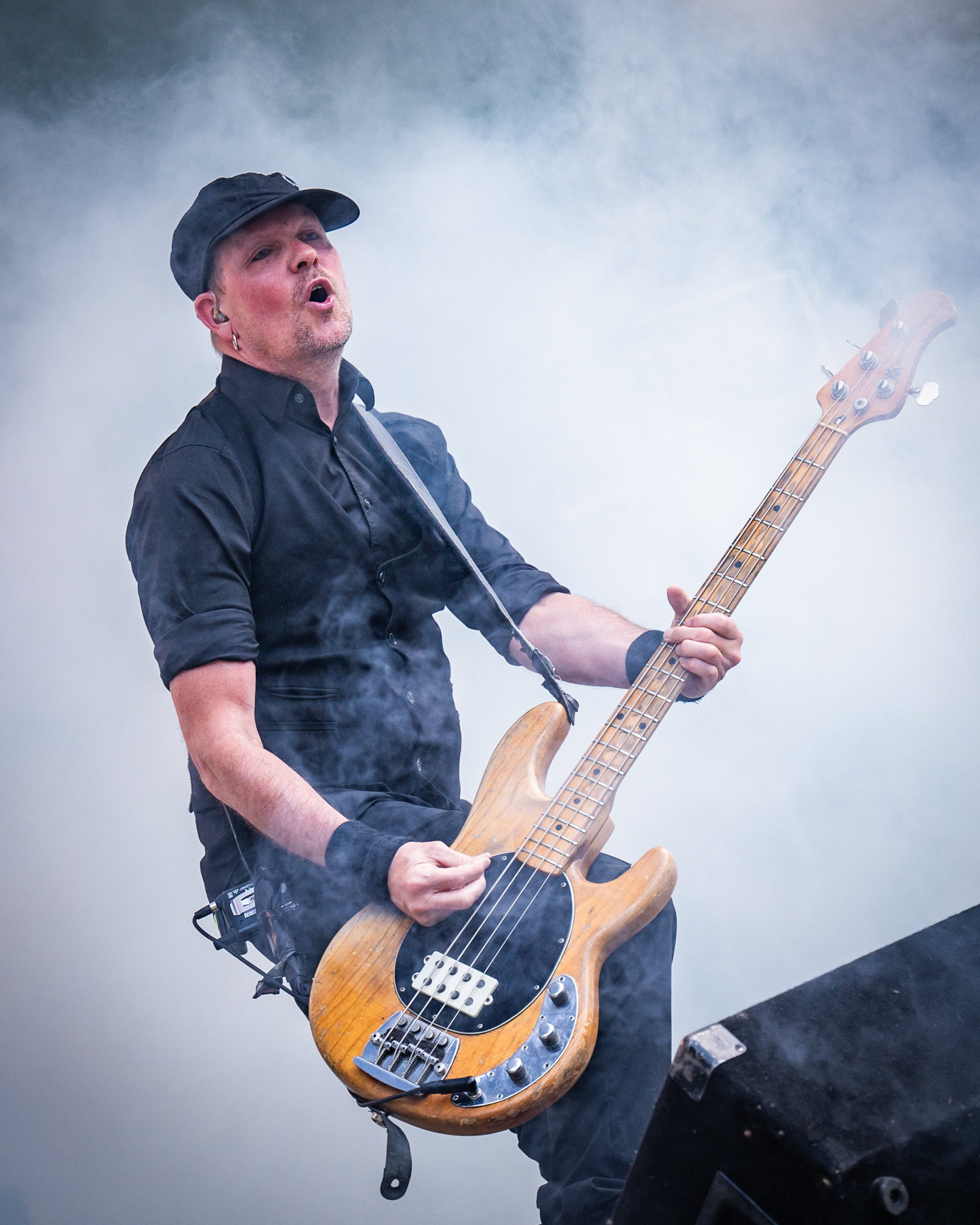
- Kim Ljung with Seigmen 2024; Photo: Birgit Fostervold

Background information
- Origin: Norway
- Genres: Alternative rock; post-rock; industrial rock; gothic rock
- Instruments: Bass, Guitar, Keyboard, Vocals

Kim Ljung (born 17 October 1971) is a musician from Tønsberg, Norway. He is best known as the bassist in Norwegian rock bands Seigmen and Zeromancer.

== Early career ==
Kim Ljung started his musical career as bass player and songsmith in the band Klisne Seigmenn in 1989. In addition to Kim, the band consisted of his kindergarten buddy Marius Roth Christensen on guitar, singer Alex Møklebust, drummer Noralf Ronthi and guitarist Sverre Økshoff.

In the beginning, the band viewed it more as fun than as a serious outlet for their musical and artistic inspirations, playing a punkish style of rock but that changed rapidly.

== Seigmen ==
In 1992, the band changed its name to Seigmen and released its first official recording, the extended play Pluto, which featured a dark sound that combined elements of progressive rock, punk rock, grunge, heavy metal and gothic rock. During the summer and fall, the CD was reissued in several editions to satisfy the growing number of fans. Combined with their stage act, the band soon turned into a household name in the underground music scene.

In the mid-1990s, with albums such as Ameneon (1993) and Total (1994), the number of fans swelled well beyond underground status.

The apex of commercial success was reached with the album Metropolis in 1995. It made its debut, in week 44, at the number 1 spot on the VG Album Charts. Within a few days it sold to Gold (25,000 copies) and didn't stop until it had passed 50,000.

The second half of the decade saw the band move in a more electronic direction with Radiowaves, their last proper studio album, in 1997.

In 1999, by the time their greatest hits album, Monument 1989–1999, was released, Sverre had decided to leave the band to focus on his family. An old agreement among the members was that if one of them left, they should disband Seigmen. And that is what happened after their final concert at Rockefeller concert hall in Oslo on March 6, 1999.

Seigmen played live at the 2012 Slottsfjell festival in Tønsberg, which was a celebrating its 10th anniversary. In 2015 Seigmen released a new album "Enola".

== Zeromancer ==
With the departure of Sverre the other members were free to form new constellations. Somehow, Marius got left out so he went on to take an education in classical music and has since appeared on both TV and radio as lead singer for choirs. The remaining three - Kim, Alex and Noralf - formed the industrial group Zeromancer with former Vampire State Building keyboard-player Erik Lunggren and the American Chris Schleyer.

Zeromancer never managed to reach the same heights, neither with respect to musical innovation nor in popularity, as Seigmen had.

So far the band has released six albums, Clone Your Lover in 2000, Eurotrash in 2001, ZZYZX in 2003, Sinners International in 2009, The Death Of Romance in 2010, Bye-Bye Borderline in 2013, and Orchestra of Knives in 2021.

== Ljungblut ==
Kim Ljung has also been active on his own. Over the years material that didn't fit in with Zeromancer has gathered weight until at some point in 2004 he felt compelled to collect some of the songs and release his first solo album.

The double CD, The other side of all things, was released on Pleasuredisc Records on February 26, 2005 under the alias Ljungblut, with a more acoustic sound than that of Seigmen.

== Later Work ==
Different members are actively pursuing their own side projects; Alex has been working as producer for a few Norwegian artists - such as Gåte and Don Juan Dracula, Erik has lent his keyboard and computer skills out to such various artists as the Swiss electro band Undergod and Norwegian black metal act Satyricon.

Although Seigmen agreed to do "one last" concert during the UKA-festival in Trondheim on October 20, 2005, they went on a small tour in Norway in the summer of 2006.

== Full Kim Discography ==
Seigmen

1. Det Finnes Alltid En Utvei [Demo] (1990)
2. Pluto [EP] (1992)
3. Ameneon [Album] (1993)
4. Monsun [Single] (1993)
5. Total [Album] (1994)
6. Hjernen er Alene [Single] (1994)
7. Döderlein [Single] (1994)
8. Lament [Single] (1994)
9. Metropolis [Album] (1995)
10. Metropolis [Single] (1995)
11. Slaver av Solen [Single] (1995)
12. Metropolis - The Grandmaster Recordings [Album] (1995)
13. Radiowaves [Album] (1997)
14. The First Wave [Single] (1997)
15. The Next Wave [Single] (1997)
16. The Opera For The Crying Machinery [Promo] (1997)
17. Mørkets Øy [Single](1997)
18. Monument [Album](1999)
19. Rockefeller [Album] (2006)
20. Döderlein [live single] (2006)
21. Enola [Album] (2015)

DVD

1. Fra x til døden (2006)

Zeromancer

1. Clone Your Lover [Album] (2000)
2. Clone Your Lover [Promo] (2000)
3. Eurotrash [Album] (2001)
4. Eurotrash [Promo] (2001)
5. Doctor Online [Single] (2001)
6. Need You Like A Drug [Promo] (2001)
7. Zzyzx [Album](2003)
8. Famous Last Words [Promo] (2003)
9. Famous Last Words [Single] (2003)
10. Erotic Saints [Promo] (2003)
11. Eurotrash [DVD] (2004)
12. Doppelganger I love you [Promo] (2007)
13. I'm yours to lose [Single] (2007)
14. Sinners International [Album] (2009)
15. It Sounds Like Love (But It Looks Like Sex) [EP] (2009)
16. The Death of Romance [Album] (2010)
17. Bye-Bye Borderline [Album] (2013)
18. Something for the Pain – Best of [Album] (2013)
19. Orchestra of Knives [Album] (2021)

Ljungblut

1. Family Album [Promo] (2004)
2. Influences For a New Album (2005)
3. The Other Side of All Things [Album, Russian Edition] (2005)
4. Capitals [Album] (2007)
5. Capitals [Album, Russian Edition] (2007)
6. Over Skyene Skinner Alltid Solen (2011)
7. Ikke Alle Netter Er Like Sorte (2016)
8. Villa Carlotta 5959 (2018)
9. Saudasjøen (2023)

Guest appearances in songs

1. SubGud - Time Machine (Kim did vocals, released on Magnet)
