= Student Society in Trondheim =

Student society and building in Norway

Coordinates: 63°25′21″N 10°23′42″E

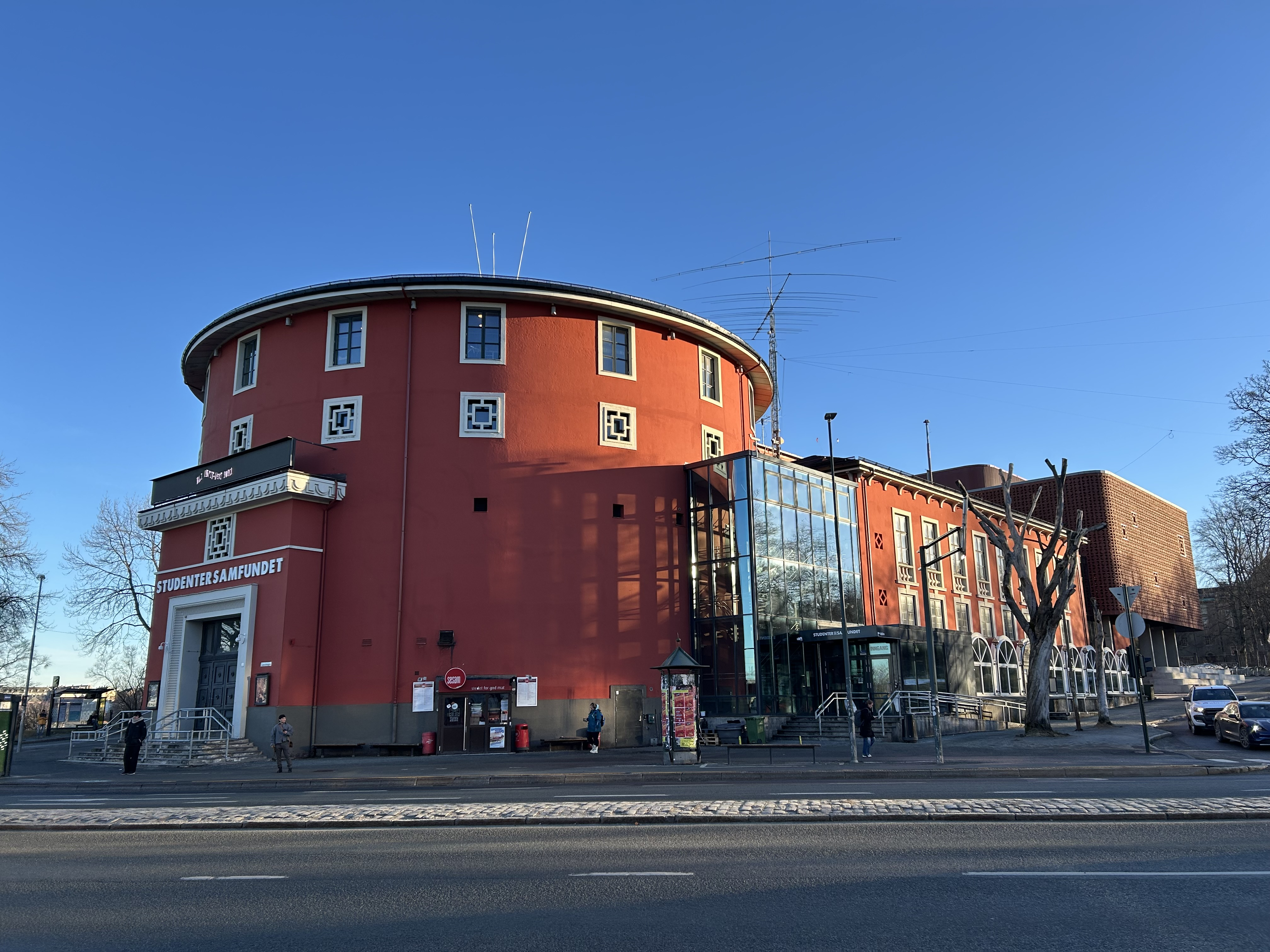
Studentersamfundet i Trondheim

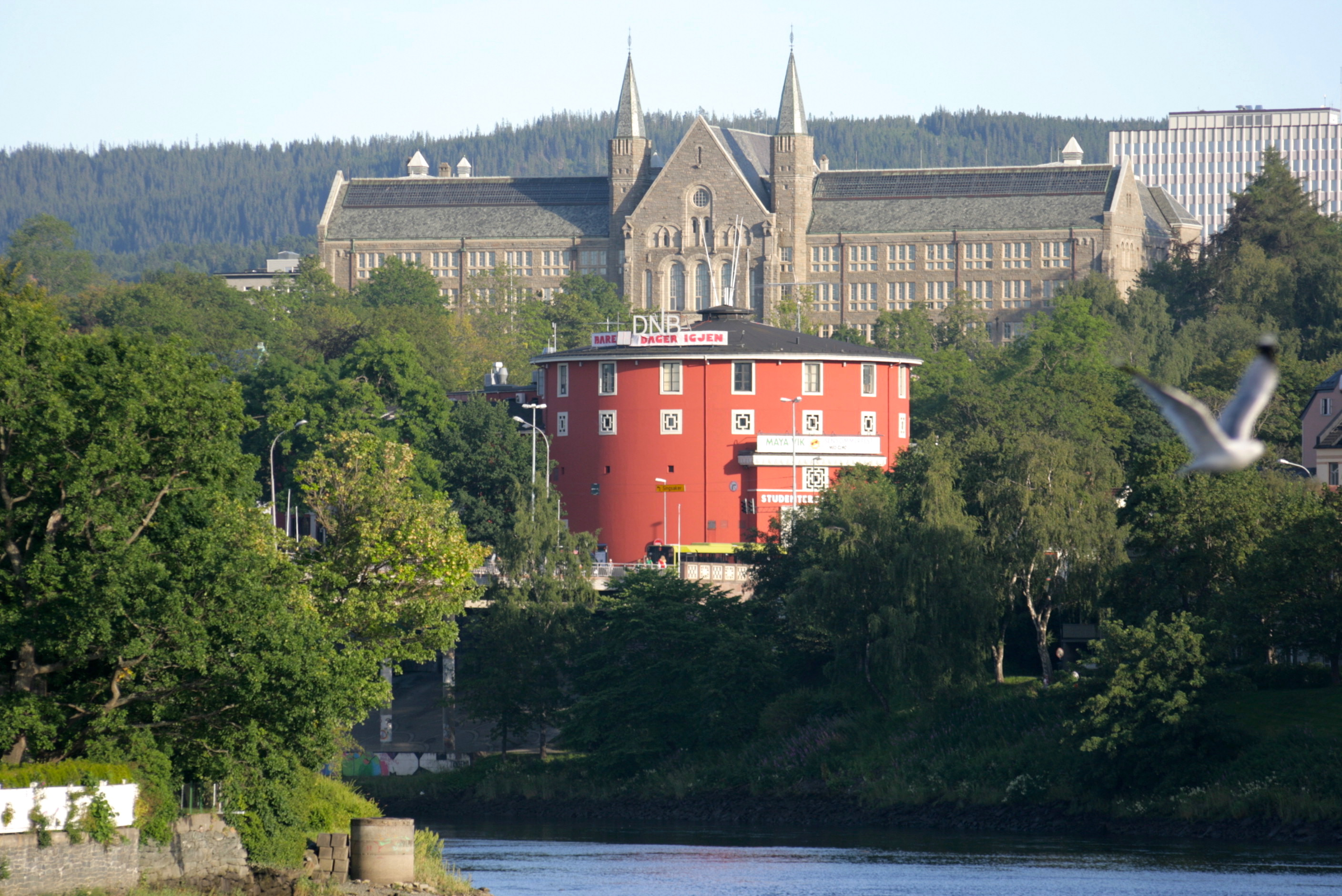
Studentersamfundet i Trondheim and NTNU photographed from a wooden bridge

The Student Society in Trondheim (Norwegian: Studentersamfundet i Trondhjem, Samfundet for short) is Norway's largest student society. It is an independent organization for all students and teachers in Trondheim, owned fully by its members. At the end of 2011, it had around 9000 members.

Samfundet's buildings house a café, a restaurant, and several bars. The society frequently hosts concerts and other activities, including UKA, the largest cultural festival in Norway. Musical artists that have performed within Samfundet include Sex Pistols, Iggy Pop, N.E.R.D., Phoenix, Public Enemy, White Lies, Crystal Fighters, Tom McRae, Motörhead, Suede, Motorpsycho, Dum Dum Boys, and In Flames, among others. Several Norwegian bands, such as Knutsen & Ludvigsen, deLillos and Postgirobygget, have started their careers on one of Samfundet's many stages.

Every other year, world figures attend The Student Society through its festival ISFiT. Past speakers include the Dalai Lama, former Director-General of the World Health Organization Gro Harlem Brundtland and Nobel Peace Prize Laureates José Ramos-Horta and Wangari Maathai.

From 1992 to 2014, Samfundet transformed into Trondheim InterRail Center (TIRC), run by society volunteers every summer.

== History ==
One week after the opening of the Norwegian Institute of Technology (NTH) (later the Norwegian University of Science and Technology, NTNU) on September 15, 1910, a group of students met and decided to create a student society. On October 1, Norges Tekniske Høgskolens Studentersamfund ("The student society of NTH") was created.

Membership was initially limited to NTH students but later expanded to all students (aged 18 and older) in the Trondheim area. In 1912, to reflect the expanded membership, the society's name changed to Studentersamfundet i Trondhjem ("The student society of Trondheim"). This is its current name, although the society has switched names twice since.

Samfundet did not have its own building for its first two years, but in 1912, they bought an old abandoned circus building (only known as "Cirkus"). The Cassa Rossa, known by Samfundet members as the "red round house", was constructed from 1927 to 1929 by Carl and Eyvind Michalsen, and the society's activities were moved there. Although Cirkus was abandoned, architect Eyvind Michalsen maintained the old traditions within the new building; Storsalen, the main concert hall, still looks very much like a circus.

== Architecture ==
Allegedly, the original drawings of Cassa Rossa called for some element of circus (in remembrance of Cirkus), as seen in Storsalen, and elements from mazes.

Cassa Rossa is split into two parts: the public and private areas. The public areas are dominated by a few large rooms, most of which are used as stages on the weekends, and hallways. The private areas, which are normally only open to the staff, have more than 200 rooms, 40 different levels and various hallways, doors and ladders. The exact number of rooms or doors in the building is unknown; attempts to make CAD models of the building have failed (except for a very coarse model used during modelling of the fire extinguisher system), simply because the pieces do not seem to fit together. Most people get lost at least a few times, and the shortest path between two places can involve fifteen or twenty turns and rooms.

In 2022, construction began to expand the Cassa Rossa on top of the old Vollan prison plot. The expansion opened in August 2024, and Cassa Rossa is now the eighth-biggest nightclub, spanning over 13.000m^{2} with a legal capacity of around 4100 people.

== Committees ==
Samfundet is mostly run by its members, who volunteer for jobs in one of its twenty or so committees (called gangs). About one thousand students help maintain the red round house by booking concerts, doing PA work during concerts, serving food and drinks, or managing the internal IT systems. In addition, Samfundet hosts several choirs and other non-technical activities.
