= Bulgarian name =

The Bulgarian name system (Bulgarian: Българска именна система) has considerable similarities with most other European name systems, and with those of other Slavic peoples, especially East Slavic ones, such as the Russian name system, although it has certain unique features.

Bulgarian names usually consist of a given name, which comes first, a patronymic, which is second (and is usually omitted when referring to the person), and a family name, which comes last.

== Bulgarian given names ==
Traditionally, the Bulgarian given names are either of Slavic origin or from Greek, Latin or Hebrew when reflecting Christian faith (e.g. Petar, Maria, Ivan, Teodora, Georgi, Nikolay, Mihail, Paraskeva, Dimitar).

The Slavic names may describe the appearance or character of the person, may constitute a wish or even stem from pre-Christian conjuring rituals that are meant not to attract the evil spirits. Below are listed examples of Bulgarian Slavic names and Bulgarian names of Greek, Latin, or Hebrew origin:

Feminine names:

Ana, Aneliya, Aneta, Bilyana, Bisera, Blagovesta, Bonislava, Bogdana, Borislava, Boryana, Boyana, Boyka, Bozhidara, Branimira, Daniela, Darina, Denitsa, Desislava, Diana, Dobromira, Elena, Elisaveta, Elitsa, Emilia, Evelina, Gabriela, Galya, Gergana, Ginka, Gloria, Grozda, Grozdana, Hristina, Iliana, Ioana, Iordanka, Ivanka, Ivelina, Kalina, Katerina, Krasimira, Kremena, Kristina, Lyudmila, Lyubov, Maia, Maria, Mariya, Marina, Mariyana, Margarita, Mila, Milena, Mira, Monika, Nadya, Nadezhda, Natalia, Nedelya, Neli, Nevena, Nikol, Nikolina, Nina, Nora, Nusha, Ognyana, Olga, Petya, Plamena, Rada, Radina, Radka, Radoslava, Radostina, Ralitsa, Raina, Raya, Rossitza, Roza, Rumyana, Savina, Simona, Stanislava, Snezhana, Stanka, Stilyana, Stoyanka, Svetlana, Tanya, Tatyana, Teodora, Todora, Todorka, Trendafila, Tsveta, Tsvetanka, Valentina, Vasilka, Veselina, Viktoria, Violeta, Vladimira, Vyara, Yana, Zhivka, Zlatka, Zora...

Masculine names:

Andrei, Angel, Aleksandar, Aleksi, Anastas, Anton, Asen, Asparuh, Atanas, Bogdan, Bogomil, Bojidar, Boris, Borislav, Boyan, Boiko, Branimir, Daniel, Danail, Delyan, Desislav, Dimo, Dobromir, Dragan, Dragomir, Elian, Genadi, Georgi, Grozdan, Hristiyan, Hristo, Hristofor, Ilian, Iordan, Ioan (Yoan), Ivan, Ivo, Ivailo, Kalin, Kaloyan, Kiril, Kostadin, Krasimir, Krum, Lyuben, Lyubomir, Mihail, Milan, Milen, Miroslav, Mladen, Momchil, Nayden, Nedelcho, Nedyalko, Nikola, Nikolay, Ognian, Ognyan, Pencho, Petar, Plamen, Radko, Radomir, Radoslav, Rayko, Rumen, Sabin, Samuil, Simeon, Spas, Stefan, Stanimir, Stanislav, Stanko, Stilyan, Stoyan, Teodor, Theodosii, Tihomir, Todor, Tsvetan, Valko, Valentin, Vasil, Ventsislav, Veselin, Vladimir, Vladislav, Yasen, Yavor, Yordan, Zdravko, Zhelyazko, Zhivko, Zlatan, Zlatko...

In addition, some Bulgarian names may be of Thracian (e.g. Neno, Dako, Geto) or Bulgar (Boris, Boyan, Biser) origin.

Since the Bulgarian National Revival and the Liberation of Bulgaria in 1878 names of successful medieval Bulgarian rulers, like Asen, Asparuh, Ivaylo, Samuil, Simeon or Krum, have also gained a lot of popularity.

Traditionally, the parents would often name their child after an older relative, so that his/her name would live on in the family. Today, however, these are not binding conditions and are often ignored: parents often pick a name without conforming with these traditions, however, still many of them continue to observe them. Traditions to name a child after the parents' best man or maid of honor or the saint on whose name day the child is born also exist.

Many Bulgarian given names have a diminutive and/or a shorter version, which is almost always used in an informal context. Following is an example of some common diminutives:

Given Name	Diminutive
Aleksandar	Sasho, Aleks
Ana	Ani
Angel	Acho
Desislav	Deso, Slav
Chavdar	Chocho
Dimitar	Mitko, Mitro
Denitsa	Denny
Nadezhda	Nadya
Todor	Tosho, Toshko, Totyo
Nikola, Nikolay	Nicky, Kolyo
Georgi	Gosho, Zhoro, Gogo, Gotse
Gergana	Geri
Hristo	Itso
Ivayla	Iva
Lyubomir	Lyubo, Lyubcho, Miro
Petar	Pesho, Petyo
Kostadin	Dinko, Kosta, Kotse
Ivan	Vanko, Vanyo
Katerina	Kate, Katya
Maria	Mara, Mima, Miche
Simeon	Simo, Monka, Moni, Simcho
Tatyana	Tanya, Tanche
Tsvetan	Tsetso
Yoana	Yonny

Often these diminutives become independent given names in their own right.

== Bulgarian patronymics and family names ==
=== Usage ===
Typically, a Bulgarian person inherits the last name of his father's family (family name), as well as a patronymic based on his father's given name, with a gender-agreeing suffix usually added. For example, Stoyan Georgiev Draganov would be the son of Georgi Petkov Draganov. The same person's daughter would bear the names Georgieva Draganova. Another way of preserving the family name and the name of a specific ancestor would be the following circulating of the names: if the father's name is Ivan Petrov Mihailov, the son is named Petar Ivanov Mihailov. Then if Petar has a son, his name will be Ivan Petrov Mihailov, and so on.

Until recently, if the father's name was not a specific family name, the child would take his patronymic as a family name, so names in a chain of generations would shift. For example, the son of Petar Stoyanov Ivanov would be Georgi Petrov Stoyanov, his son would be Ivaylo Georgiev Petrov, his son would be Marin Ivaylov Georgiev. This practice often caused confusion in the past, especially when dealing for foreign institutions, since a child did not bear his father's family name. However, the recent generation has all but abandoned this practice.

When marrying, today a woman may choose either to adopt her husband's family name, retain her maiden name or combine the two using a hyphen. For instance, when marrying Nikolay Petrov, Maria Bogdanova could become Petrova, remain Bogdanova or adopt Petrova-Bogdanova or Bogdanova-Petrova. Historically, she would adopt her husband's name. In any case, a woman retains her patronymic, which she has inherited from her father.

The Family Code (Bulgarian law regulating wedlock, cohabitation and family) allows the reverse as well: the husband may also take or add his wife's family name.

Sometimes a person is well known and referred to with his patronymic, e.g. sci-fi writer Lyuben Dilov's full name is Lyuben Dilov Ivanov, the Bulgarian cosmonaut Georgi Ivanov's full name is Georgi Ivanov Kakalov, and footballer Georgi Asparuhov's full name is Georgi Asparuhov Rangelov.

Among Bulgarians in Serbia, as well as in other countries throughout the world, the a ending of women's surnames is usually dropped, resulting in names such as Elizabeta Nikolov instead of Nikolova. Other examples of changes in the family name of Bulgarians living abroad is how Nikolov turns into Nikoloff.

=== Etymology ===
In most cases (though by no means always), the etymology of Bulgarian patronymics and family names closely corresponds to that of given names. Many families bear the name of the family's founder, adding the patronymic Slavic suffix "–ov/–ev" (men) or "–ova/–eva" (women) (e.g. Ivanov, Radeva, Parvanov, Petrova, Asenov, Tsvetanova). Family names may indicate the occupation of the founder, his nickname or origin, in which case names of Ottoman Turkish or Greek etymology can be found in addition to those of Slavic origin (e.g. Kolarov, Kalaydzhieva, Popova, Cholakov, Kovacheva, Daskalov, Tepavicharov, Uzunova).

=== Suffixes ===
Most Bulgarian surnames end with "–ov(a)" or "–ev(a)". They work the same way as the patronymic (and are in fact derived from them), and are possessive forms of given names. The "–ov/–ev" (masculine) and "–ova/–eva" (feminine) suffixes are also extremely popular and commonly used by Russians and Macedonians. Consequently, the surnames Ivanov(a), Petrov(a) and Mladenov(a) are the three most common surnames in Bulgaria. As these "–ov/–ev" surnames are indistinguishable from patronymics, it is not uncommon for people to have the same patronymic and surname; for instance the children of Petar Ivanov Petrov would be Georgi Petrov Petrov and Lyudmila Petrova Petrova. (This would also be distinguished from Russians, who would be named "Georgi Petrovich Petrov" and "Lyudmila Petrovna Petrova".)

Although most popular, "–ov/–ev" and respectively "–ova/–eva" are not the only patronymic and family name suffixes. The second most popular suffix is "–ski/–ska" (sometimes "–ki/–ka") (e.g. Zelenogorski, Stoykovska, Petrinska), which, besides often being merely a version of an "–ov/–ev" or "-–ova/–eva" name, may also often indicate origin (e.g. Sofianski — "from Sofia", Stamboliyski — "from Istanbul"). This suffix is not only popular with Bulgarians but with most other Slavic people, such as Polish, Macedonians, Russians (most often transcribed as "-sky"), Belarusians and Ukrainians.

Another suffix is "–in/–ina" (e.g. Kunin, Ganina, Radin). Unlike all other Bulgarian patronymics and family names, these stem from a female name (e.g. "of Kuna", "of Gana", "of Rada"). They are most common in the region of Razlog and Bansko. The "–in" suffix is also popular with Russians.

For these three most popular suffixes, there is also a plural form used when referring to the family as a whole or several members of it (as opposed to a single member). For "–ov/–ova" and "–ev/–eva" it is "–ovi/–evi", for "–ski/–ska" it is "–ski" and for "–in/–ina" the form is "–ini".

Historically, the universal suffix "–ovich" and "-evich" was quite popular in some regions (bearers of such names include Gavril Krastevich, Hristofor Zhefarovich, Petar Parchevich, Kiril Peychinovich, etc.), particularly among the Roman Catholic Bulgarians, but has today largely fallen out of use and is more typical for the Serbo-Croatian name system (where it is usually spelled "-ić").

In addition, other suffixes also exist: for instance, names like Tihanek, Kozlek, Lomek (suffixed "–ek") were historically dominant in the town of Koprivshtitsa.

Names lacking a suffix, although often foreign-sounding, have been more popular in the past, but still exist today (e.g. Beron, Tomash), despite being quite uncommon.

== Most popular names ==
According to one study using telephone directory data, the four most popular male given names are Ivan (43,882 holders), Georgi (40,288), Dimitar (31,471) and Petar (20,602). The most popular female names are Maria (20,108), Ivanka (11,872) Elena (9,568), Yordanka (7,962) and Penka (6,696). The top nine family names are Ivanov/a, Georgiev/a, Mladenov/a, Petrov/a, Nikolov/a, Hristov/a, Stoyanov/a, Todorov/a and Iliev/a.

== See also ==
- Bulgarian language
- Bulgarians
- Name days in Bulgaria
- Slavic names
- Slavic surnames
