= The Central European Institute Søren Kierkegaard =

Research institute in Slovenia

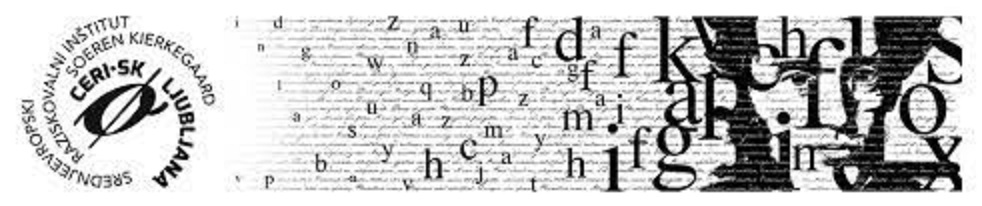
The Central European Institute Søren Kierkegaard

The Central European Institute Søren Kierkegaard was established after the 4th International Philosophical Symposium of Miklavž Ocepek, organized by KUD Apokalipsa in June 2013 to commemorate the bicentennial of the birth of Søren Kierkegaard at the initiative of dr. Primož Repar, who committed himself to the lifelong study of the thoughts of the "pioneer of existentialism" and is also the first systematic translator of his works into Slovene from the Danish original and the first to receive a doctorate in Slovenia from his work. It was one of the world's greatest one-off events in this jubilee Kierkegaard Year (55 lectures, 80 events). Since then, the institute has nurtured the idea of "existential turn" and the "new economics of relationships" and the ethics of caring for the other/neighbor inspired by Kierkegaard's thought.

The specialty of the institute is that it is broadly conceptualized not only to study Kierkegaard's thought, its Central European context but Kierkegaard's thought is dedicated to the development of philosophy of existence, interdisciplinary dialogue of domestic, Central European and world dimensions in many creative fields of philosophy, science, psychoanalysis, gender studies, anthropology, aesthetics, etc. and all the way to creative fields such as poetry, photography or comics. The Institute is an independent civil society organization and thus goes beyond narrowly conceived academic significance. It is organized in three circles, the first two are organized in 49 sections, which are self-governing creative cells that work in the spirit of existential communication and offer suggestions for the implementation of the third circle and, if possible, help implement the institute program, prepare events and more. It is about the global networking of living culture – "the spirit travel where it wants". All programs are coordinated by dr. Primož Repar, who has also been the director of the institute since its establishment.

Every year, the Institute together with KUD Apokalipsa organizes international conference and workshops or programs under the name Kierkegaard's Year. From the very beginning, the conferences have been held at Cankarjev Dom in Ljubljana, where they update Kierkegaard's thought every year according to a burning topic concerning the social and spiritual situation in the world. The accompanying program is followed by other creative events from philosophical quizzes to theater performances, literary, musical events or painting, photography or comics exhibitions, screenings, etc.

The Kierkegaard Institute in Ljubljana has also deepened the Central European "spiritual" dialogue and promoted Kierkegaard's research and encouraged new ones in connection with creative possibilities and initiatives on a domestic, Central European and global scale. Since its establishment, it has enabled more than 500 lectures in Slovenia and Europe. Institute also works closely with some similar organizations around the world, in particular the Kierkegaard Circle from the University of Toronto, with which it co-organized appearances at the 24th World Philosophy Congress in Beijing 2018 in the field of Kierkegaard tables. Since 2016 Toronto and Ljubljana also publish a joint sub-collection dedicated to Kierkegaard's monographs in English. The editors of the sub-collection are Darko Štrajn from Slovenia and Jasna Koteska from North Macedonia, who is also a member of its Academy of Sciences and Arts.

The Central European Research Institute Soeren Kierkegaard together with KUD Apokalipsa also publishes professional collections of annual symposia, conferences and workshops in both Slovenian and English language – 13 such publications have been published so far. In collaboration with a related institute and Canadian supporters (Kierkegaard Circle, as well as CERI – SK Nitra, Slovakia), it has also published one of the publications Acta Kierkegaardiana Supplement. In cooperation with its partners, the institute has already published around 50 different books in Slovene, English, Slovak or Czech.

In 2023, in addition to publishing a monographic sub-collection (together with Toronto), the Institute will also start systematically publishing Kierkegaard's works in Slovene in the newly established SKUPI collection (Kierkegaard's Ultimate Production).

In 2019, the institute also founded the International Philosophical School of Existential Philosophy on the Croatian island of Unije, which is intended for summer weekly schools for young researchers of Kierkegaard's Thought.
