= Holberg Prize =

The Holberg Prize
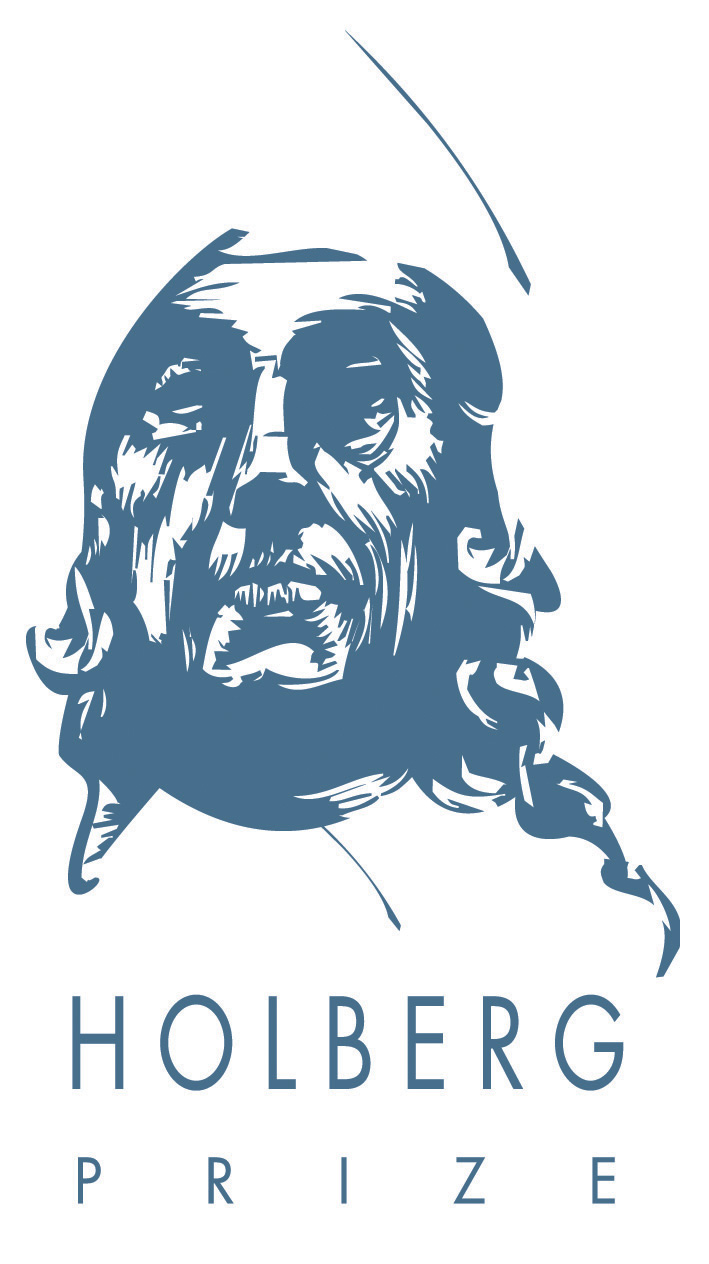
- Awarded for: Outstanding scholarly work in the fields of the arts and humanities, social sciences, law and theology.
- Country: Norway
- Presented by: Government of Norway
- First award: 2004
- Website: holbergprize.org/en

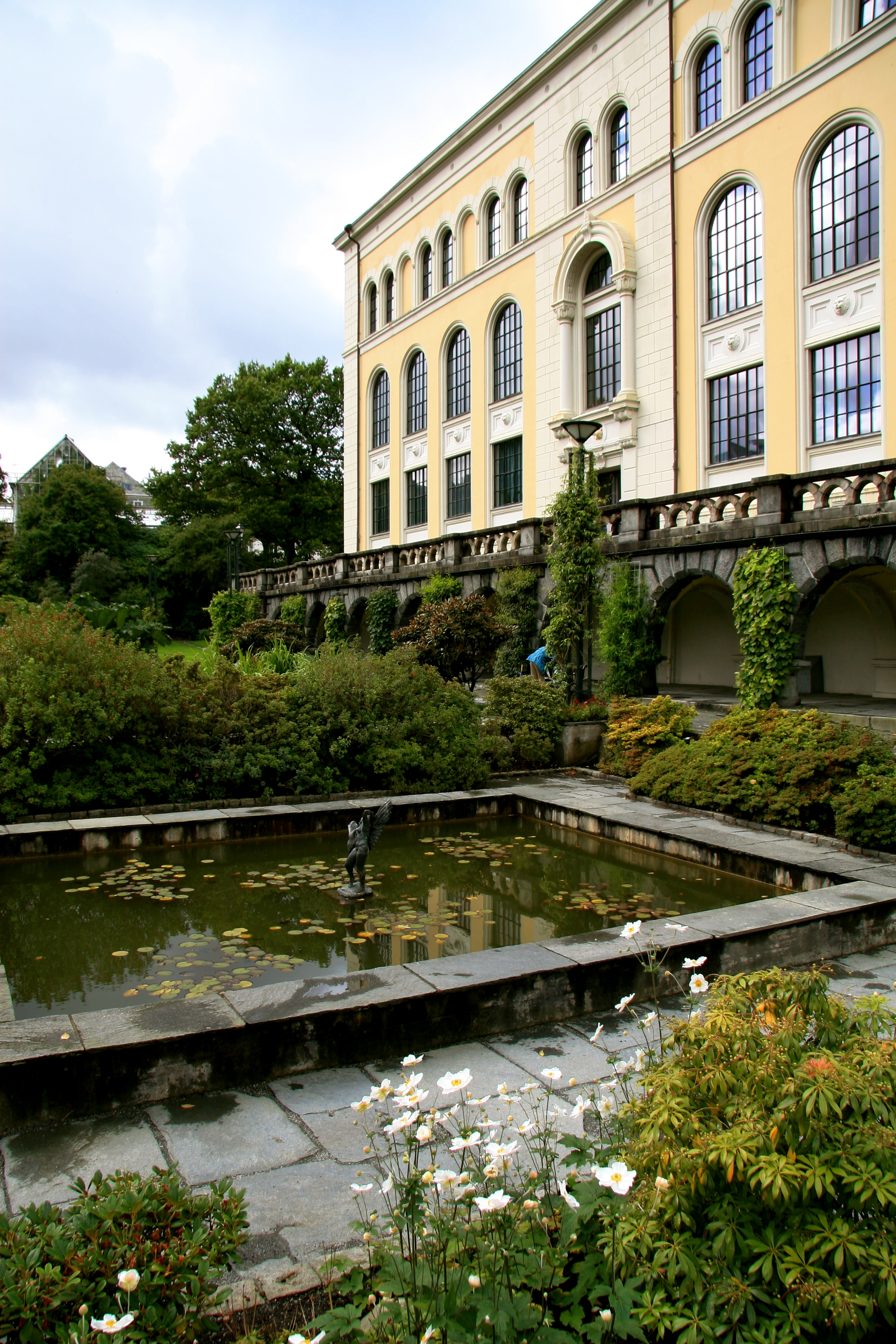
The Holberg Prize is awarded annually in the University Aula in Bergen.

The Holberg Prize is an international prize awarded annually by the government of Norway to outstanding scholars for work in humanities, social sciences, law and theology, either within one of these fields or through interdisciplinary work. The prize is named after the Danish-Norwegian writer and academic Ludvig Holberg (1684–1754). The Holberg Prize comes with a monetary award of 6 million Norwegian kroner (NOK), which are intended to be used to further the research of the recipient. The winner of the Holberg Prize is announced in March, and the award ceremony takes place every June in Bergen, Norway.

According to a reputation survey conducted in 2018, the Holberg Prize is the most prestigious interdisciplinary award in the social sciences (jointly with the Stein Rokkan Prize for Comparative Social Science Research).

== History ==
The prize was established by the Parliament of Norway in honor of Ludvig Holberg in 2003 and complements its sister prize in mathematics, the Abel Prize. Ludvig Holberg, who excelled in all the disciplines covered by the award, played an important part in bringing the Enlightenment to the Nordic countries and is also well known as a playwright and author. The objective of the prize was to increase awareness of the value of academic scholarship in the arts, humanities, social sciences, law and theology. It has been described as the "Nobel Prize" for the arts and humanities, social sciences, law and theology.

== Selection criteria ==
The Holberg Prize is awarded annually to scholars who have made "outstanding contributions to research in the arts and humanities, social sciences, law or theology." Scholars holding positions at universities and other research institutions, including academies, are eligible to nominate candidates to the Holberg Prize and the Nils Klim Prize. Self-nominations are not permitted. The Holberg Board awards the prize at the recommendation of the Holberg Committee. The Holberg Committee meets twice. At the first meeting, in early fall, they choose a shortlist from the nominations. The Committee then gather assessments on the short-list candidates from internationally recognized scholars before giving their final recommendation to the Board.

== Organization ==
The Holberg Prize is funded through a direct allocation from the Norwegian government's budget. It is administered by the University of Bergen on behalf of the Ministry of Education and Research. The University of Bergen appoints the executive board of the Holberg Prize. The Holberg Board consists of the board chair and five board members. The board members must work in different institutions, and at least one board member must work outside the university and university college sector. Board members are appointed for a period of four years and may be reappointed once. The current Holberg Board is composed of: Jørgen Magnus Sejersted (Chair, University of Bergen), Lise Rye (Norwegian University of Science and Technology), Hans Petter Graver (University of Oslo), Siv Ellen Kraft (University of Tromsø), Jette F.Christensen (Altinget) and Tore Wig (University of Oslo),

The Holberg Board awards the prize at the recommendation of the Holberg Committee who consists of five outstanding researchers in humanities, social sciences, law and theology. The current Holberg Prize Academic Committee is composed of: Ann phoenix (Committee chairman, University College London), Ryan Nefdt (University of Cape town), Heike Krieger (Free University of Berlin), Birgit Meyer (Utrecht University) and Sari Hanafi (American University of Beirut).

== Laureates ==
Year	Image	Laureate(s)	Country	Language(s)	Citation	Field(s)
2004		Julia Kristeva (b. 1941)	Bulgaria; France	Bulgarian, French, and English	"for innovative explorations of questions on the intersection of language, culture and literature which inspired research across the humanities and the social sciences throughout the world and have also had a significant impact on feminist theory"	philosophy of language, semiotics, literary criticism, psychoanalysis, feminism
2005		Jürgen Habermas (1929–2026)	Germany	German and English	"for developing path-breaking theories of discourse and communicative action and thereby providing new perspectives on law and democracy"	epistemology, social theory political theory, philosophy of law, Rationalization, pragmatics, pragmatism
2006		Shmuel Eisenstadt (1923–2010)	Poland; Israel	Polish, English, and Hebrew	"for developing comparative knowledge of exceptional quality and originality concerning social change and modernization, and concerning relations between culture, belief systems and political institutions"	social anthropology, social history, political science
2007		Ronald Dworkin (1931–2013)	United States	English	"for developing an original and highly influential legal theory grounding law in morality, characterized by a unique ability to tie together abstract philosophical ideas and arguments with concrete everyday concerns in law, morals, and politics"	social justice, legal theory, political philosophy
2008		Fredric Jameson (1934–2024)	United States	English	"for outstanding contributions to the understanding of the relation between social formations and cultural forms in a project he himself describes as the 'poetics of social forms'"	postmodernism, hermeneutics, cultural studies, dialectical method, history
2009		Ian Hacking (1936–2023)	Canada	English	"for his combination of rigorous philosophical and historical analysis which has profoundly altered our understanding of the ways in which key concepts emerge through scientific practices and in specific social and institutional contexts"	philosophy of science, philosophy of statistics
2010		Natalie Zemon Davis (1928–2023)	United States; Canada	English and French	for "connecting early modern Europe with new areas of comparative history, exploring cultural, geographical and religious interchange"	social history, cultural history, social anthropology, ethnography, literary theory
2011		Jürgen Kocka (b. 1941)	Germany	German and English	"for effecting a paradigm shift in German historiography by opening it up to related social sciences and establishing the importance of cross-national comparative approaches"	social history, hermeneutics, historiography
2012		Manuel Castells Oliván (b. 1942)	Spain	Spanish, French, and English	for shaping "our understanding of the political dynamics of urban and global economies in the network society"	communication studies, organization studies, network society, urban sociology, sociology of culture, political economy
2013		Bruno Latour (1947–2022)	France	French and English	for having "undertaken an ambitious analysis and reinterpretation of modernity, and [having] challenged fundamental concepts such as the distinction between modern and pre-modern, nature and society, human and non-human"	postmodernism, social constructionism, actor–network theory, metaphysics, social anthropology
2014		Michael Cook (b. 1940)	United Kingdom	English	for having "reshaped fields that span Ottoman studies, the genesis of early Islamic polity, the history of the Wahhabiyya movement, and Islamic law, ethics, and theology"	oriental studies, history of religion
2015		Marina Warner (b. 1946)	United Kingdom	English	for her "analysis of stories and myths and how they reflect their time and place."	mythography, feminism, oral tradition
2016		Stephen Greenblatt (b. 1943)	United States	English	for being "one of the most important Shakespeare scholars of his generation"	new historicism, Renaissance studies, cultural studies
2017		Onora O'Neill (b. 1941)	United Kingdom	English	for "her influential role in ethical and political philosophy"	political philosophy, ethics
2018	Cass Sunstein (2008)	Cass Sunstein (b. 1954)	United States	English	for having "reshaped our understanding of the relationship between the modern regulatory state and constitutional law."	legal theory, constitutional law, environmental law, administrative law, behavioral economics, social theory
2019		Paul Gilroy (b. 1956)	United Kingdom	English	"for his contributions to critical race studies, post-colonialism and related fields"	cultural politics, cultural history, social anthropology
2020	Griselda Pollock (2019)	Griselda Pollock (b. 1949)	South Africa; Canada	English	"for her groundbreaking contributions to feminist art history and cultural studies."	feminist theory, feminism, art history, gender studies
2021		Martha Nussbaum (b. 1947)	United States	English	"for her groundbreaking contribution to research in philosophy, law and related fields."	liberal theory, political philosophy, feminism, ethics, social liberalism
2022	Jasanoff-Stewart-USE	Sheila Jasanoff (b. 1944)	United States	English	"for her groundbreaking research in science and technology studies"	science and technology studies, political sociology, public reason, capacity building
2023	Joan Martinez-Alier	Joan Martinez Alier (b. 1939)	Spain	Catalan, Spanish, and English	"for his research in ecological economics, political ecology and environmental justice."	ecological economics, political ecology, environmentalism of the poor
2024	Achille Mbembe	Achille Mbembe (b. 1957)	Cameroon	French, and English	"for his pioneering research in African history, postcolonial studies, humanities, and social science over four decades."	African history, politics, postcolonial studies, social science
2025		Gayatri Chakravorty Spivak (b. 1942)	India	Bengali, English, and French	"for her groundbreaking work in the fields of literary theory and philosophy."	Literary criticism, feminism, Marxism, postcolonialism, contemporary philosophy
2026	Lyndal Roper	Lyndal Roper (b. 1956)	Australia; United Kingdom	English	"... for her pioneering work on early modern European history"	European history

== The Holberg Week ==
During The Holberg Week in June, The Holberg Prize hosts a series of lectures, discussions and other events in honor of the Holberg Laureate and the Nils Klim Laureate. The events feature the laureates, as well as other high-profile international scholars. The program feature, among other things, the Holberg Symposium, the Nils Klim Seminar and the Holberg Lecture. All events during the Holberg week, with the exception of the award ceremony and government banquet, are open to all and have free entrance. Several of the events are also livestreamed, and available to an international audience.

== The Holberg Debate ==
The Holberg Debate is an annual event organised by the Holberg Prize. The debate is inspired by Ludvig Holberg's Enlightenment ideas and aims to explore pressing issues of our time. The Holberg Debate was organised for the first time in 2016 and has since been held annually, on the first Saturday in December. The aim is both to see important voices debate pressing issues of our time and to highlight the relevance of the academic fields covered by the Holberg Prize: the humanities, social sciences, law and theology. Thus, the Holberg Debate seeks to engage both the university community and the public at large, and seeks to invite well known thinkers with a diverse background, including academics, journalists, authors, film makers and activists.

Former participants in the Holberg Debate are Slavoj Žižek, Timothy Garton Ash, Jostein Gripsrud, Jonathan Heawood, John Pilger and Julian Assange.

== Other prizes ==
As part of its research dissemination targeting younger people, the Holberg Prize also awards two other prizes:

- The Nils Klim Prize is awarded annually to a younger Nordic researcher who has made an outstanding contribution to research in the arts and humanities, social science, law or theology.
- The Holberg Prize School Project is a research competition for students in the upper secondary schools in Norway.

== Symposiums ==
The Holberg Symposium is held annually in honor of the winner of The Holberg Prize. The event hosts prominent speakers who partake in a symposium dedicated to The Holberg Prize laureate.

- Symposium in Honor of Julia Kristeva, 2004 – "Thinking About Liberty in Dark Times"
  - Participants: Kelly Oliver, Sara Beardsworth, John Fletcher, Atle Kittang and Iréne Matthis.
- Symposium in Honor of Jürgen Habermas, 2005 – "Religion in the Public Sphere"
  - Participants: Arne Johan Vetlesen, Gunnar Skirbekk, Cristina Lafont, Cathrine Holst, Helge Høibraaten, Craig Calhoun, Thomas M. Schmidt, Jon Hellesnes, Hauke Brunkhorst and Tore Lindholm.
- Symposium in Honor of Shmuel Eisenstadt, 2006 – "The Processes that Change the World"
  - Participants: Jack A. Goldstone, Jonathan Friedman, Sverre Bagge, Johann P. Arnason, Donald Levine, Bernhard Giesen, Shalini Randeria, Jeffrey Alexander, Fredrik Barth, Rajeev Bhargava, Saïd Amir Arjomand, Shalini Randeria, Luis Roniger, Nina Witoszek-FitzPatrick, Yehuda Elkana, Georg Klein, and Bernt Hagtvet.
- Symposium in Honor of Ronald Dworkin, 2007
  - Participants: Jan Fridthjof Bernt, Stephen Guest, Frank Henry Sommer, Jeremy Bentham's severed head, Jeremy Waldron, Peter Koller, Rebecca Brown, Seana Shiffrin, Thomas Nagel, Rainer Forst, Dietmar von der Pfordten and Synne Sæther Mæhle.
- Symposium in Honor of Fredric Jameson, 2008
  - Participants: William A. Lane, Jr, Astrid Söderbergh Widding, Paik Nak-chung, Maria Elisa Cevasco, Wang Hui, Michael Löwy, Perry Anderson, Sara Danius, Helmut F. Stern and Xiaobing Tang.
- Symposium in Honor of Ian Hacking, 2009
  - Participants: Ragnar Fjelland, Professor Dagfinn Føllesdal, Bruna De Marchi and Merle Jacob.
- Symposium in Honor of Natalie Zemon Davis, 2010 – "Doing decentered history – the global in the local"
  - Participants: Bonnie G. Smith, David Abulafia, Joan W. Scott, Ida Blom and Erling Sverdrup Sandmo.
- Symposium in Honor of Jürgen Kocka, 2011 – "Civil Society and the Welfare State: Competitors or allies?"
  - Participants: Theda Skocpol, Christoph Conrad, Per Selle, Simone Lässig, Stein Kuhnle and Ivar Bleiklie.
- Symposium in Honor of Manuel Castells, 2012 – "Media and Democracy"
  - Participants: Ivar Bleiklie, Helga Nowotny, Göran Therborn, Helen Margetts, Andrew Chadwick, Jostein Gripsrud, Terhi Rantanen, Annabelle Sreberny, William Dutton and Mette Andersson.
- Symposium in Honor of Bruno Latour, 2013 – "From Economics to Ecology".
  - Participants: Barbara Czarniawska, Dominique Pestre, Mike Hulme, Bronislaw Szerszynski, Oliver Morton, Adam Lowe,
- Symposium in Honor of Michael Cook, 2014 – "Ancient Religions, Modern Dissent".
  - Participants: Guy Stroumsa, Sabine Schmidtke, Maribel Fierro, Petra Sijpesteijn, Muhammad Qasim Zaman, and Mona Siddiqui.
- Symposium in Honor of Marina Warner, 2015 – "Myth, Homelessness, and the "Country of Words”".
  - Participants: Wendy Doniger, Roy Foster, Finbarr Barry Flood, Wen-chin Ouyang, and Tamim al-Barghouti.
- Symposium in Honor of Stephen Greenblatt, 2016 – "Art in life/Life in art".
  - Participants: Horst Bredekamp, Joseph Koerner, Pippa Skotnes, Homi Bhabha, Adam Phillips, Sarah Cole, Louis Menand, and Daniel Jütte.
- Symposium in Honor of Onora O'Neill, 2017 – "Ethics for Communication".
  - Participants: Jonathan Heawood, Rowan Cruft, Laura Valentini, Steven Barnett, and Rae Langton.
- Symposium in Honor of Cass Sunstein, 2018 – "Democracy and Truth".
  - Participants: Tali Sharot, Tyler Cowen, Samantha Power, Lawrence Lessig
- Symposium in Honor of Paul Gilroy, 2019 – "From Double Consciousness to Planetary Humanism".
  - Participants: Temi Odumosu, Sivamohan Valluvan, Lidia Curti, and Katherine McKittrick.
- Symposium in Honor of Griselda Pollock, 2020, will take place 2021.

== See also ==
- List of history awards
- List of philosophy awards
- List of religion-related awards
- List of social sciences awards
