= Krastev =

Krastev (Bulgarian: Кръстев) is a Bulgarian last name derived from the Bulgarian word "krast"/"кръст" which means Cross. Notable people with this last name include:

- Anatoli Krastev (born 1947), Bulgarian cellist and pedagogue
- Anna Krasteva (born 1977), Bulgarian Olympic short trek speed skater
- Antonio Krastev (1961–2020), Bulgarian super heavyweight weightlifter
- Atanas Krastev (born 1993), Bulgarian association football player
- Beloslava Krasteva (born 2004), Bulgarian chess master
- Dimo Krastev (born 2003), Bulgarian association football player
- Emil Krastev (born 1977), Bulgarian boxer
- Filip Krastev (born 2001), Bulgarian association football player
- Ivan Krastev (born 1965), Bulgarian political scientist
- Ivan Krastev (wrestler) (born 1946), Bulgarian Olympic wrestler
- Kaloyan Krastev (born 1999), Bulgarian association football player
- Krasimir Krastev (footballer) (born 1984), Bulgarian association football player
- Krasimir Krastev (sailor) (1910–unknown), Bulgarian sailor
- Krastyo Krastev (1866–1919), Bulgarian writer and philosopher
- Malin Krastev (born 1970), Bulgarian director and actor
- Monika Krasteva (born 1999), Bulgarian volleyball player
- Nadia Krasteva, Bulgarian opera singer
- Neva Krysteva (Krasteva) (born 1946), Bulgarian organist and composer
- Nikolay Krastev (disambiguation), several people
- Plamen Krastev (born 1958), Bulgarian Olympic hurdler
- Stefan Krastev (born 1953), Bulgarian sports shooter
- Stoyka Krasteva (born 1985), Bulgarian boxer
- Todor Krastev (1945–2000), Bulgarian association football player
- Tsvetan Krastev (born 1978), Bulgarian association football player
- Tsvetanka Krasteva (born 1935), Bulgarian athlete
- Veneta Krasteva (born 1991), Bulgarian model
