= Organon F =

- Discipline: Analytic philosophy
- Language: English
- Edited by: Martin Vacek

Publication details
- History: 1994–present
- Publisher: Institute of Philosophy of the Slovak Academy of Sciences and the Institute of Philosophy of the Czech Academy of Sciences
- Frequency: Quarterly
- Open access: Yes
- License: CC BY-NC 4.0
- Impact factor: 0.3 (2023)

Standard abbreviations
- ISO 4: Organon F

Indexing
- ISSN: 1335-0668 (print); 2585-7150 (web)
- LCCN: 2003200336
- OCLC no.: 1153284159

Links
- Journal homepage; Online access; Online archive

Organon F is a quarterly peer-reviewed open access academic journal covering analytic philosophy. It was established in 1994. The term "organon" stems from its use in philosophy to indicate a philosophical tool. The F is based on the Slovak word "filozofie", which simply translates to "philosophy". The journal was originally going to be simply titled Organon, but shortly before publication a magazine with that title was found to exist, so the "F" was added to disambiguate the two periodicals. One of the motivating factors behind the journal was that there was only one Slovak philosophy journal at the time, Filozofia. The founders of Organon F thought that this journal was monopolizing the philosophical conversation with limited viewpoints, thus establishing the need for a new journal.

The journal is fully funded by its publishers, the Institute of Philosophy of the Slovak Academy of Sciences and the Institute of Philosophy of the Czech Academy of Sciences, and therefore has no article processing charges or other fees for authors while making its content freely available online.

== Abstracting and indexing ==
The journal is abstracted and indexed in the Arts and Humanities Citation Index, Current Contents/Arts & Humanities, Directory of Open Access Journals, Linguistic Bibliography, Philosopher's Index, and Scopus. According to the Journal Citation Reports, the journal has a 2023 impact factor of 0.3.
