= Widding =

Widding is a Scandinavian surname. Notable people with the surname include:

- Astrid Söderbergh Widding (born 1963), Swedish academic
- Elsa Widding (born 1968), Swedish politician
- Lars Widding (1924–1994), Swedish author and journalist
