= Krasimir Krastev =

Krasimir Krastev may refer to:

- Krasimir Krastev (footballer)
- Krasimir Krastev (sailor)
