= Brunkhorst =

Brunkhorst is a German surname. Notable people with the surname include:

- Zachary Brunkhorst (born 1998), Cirque du Soleil Stage Manager
- Angelika Brunkhorst (born 1955), German politician
- Bob Brunkhorst (born 1965), American politician
- Brian Brunkhorst (born 1945), American basketball player
- Hauke Brunkhorst (born 1945), German sociologist
