= Grønhaug =

Grønhaug is a surname. Notable people with the surname include:

- Kjell Grønhaug (born 1935), Norwegian organizational theorist, management consultant, and professor
- Reidar Grønhaug (1938–2005), Norwegian social anthropologist
