= Ognjenović =

Ognjenović (Serbian Cyrillic: Огњеновић) is a Serbian surname, a patronymic derived from the masculine given name Ognjen. It may refer to:

- Maja Ognjenović (born 1984), volleyball player
- Mirjana Ognjenović (born 1953), handball player
- Perica Ognjenović (born 1977), footballer
- Svetlana Ognjenović (born 1981), handball player
- Vida Ognjenović (born 1941), writer

== See also ==
- Ognjanović
