= Stanislava =

- Gender: Female

Origin
- Origin: Slavic
- Meaning: one who achieves glory
- Region of origin: Central-Eastern Europe

Other names
- Related names: Stanislav

Stanislava or Stanisława is the female form of the Slavic given name Stanislav, which means "one who achieves glory". It is most often found in the Slavic countries of central and eastern Europe. The name may refer to:

== People ==
- Stanisława Angel-Engelówna (1908–1958), Polish actress
- Stanislava Brezovar (1937–2003), Slovenian ballerina
- Stanislava Bubulytė (born 1945), Lithuanian rower
- Stanisława Celińska (born 1947), Polish actress
- Stanisława de Karłowska (1876–1952), Polish artist
- Stanisława Dowgiałłówna (1865–1933), Polish pharmacist
- Stanislava Hrnjak (born 1976), Serbian politician
- Stanislava Hrozenská (born 1982), Slovak tennis player
- Stanislava Jachnická (born 1965), Czech actress
- Stanislava Janošević, Serbian politician
- Stana Katić (born 1978), Canadian actress
- Stanislava Klimashevskaya (1851–1939), Russian photographer
- Stanislava Komarova (born 1986), Russian swimmer
- Stanislava Konstantinova (born 2000), Russian figure skater
- Stanisława Leszczyńska (1896–1974), Polish midwife
- Stanislava Lišková (born 1997), Slovak footballer
- Stanisława Nikodym (1897–1988), Polish mathematician
- Stanislava Nopova (born 1953), Czech writer
- Stanisława Nowicka (1905–1990), Polish dancer and singer
- Stanisława Anna Okularczyk (born 1943), Polish politician
- Stanislava Pak (born 1971), Serbian politician and television presenter
- Stanisława Perzanowska (1898–1982), Polish actress
- Stanisława Pietruszczak (born 1953), Polish speed skater
- Stanisława Prządka (born 1943), Polish politician
- Stanisława Przybyszewska (1901–1935), Polish writer
- Stanislava Repar (born 1960), Slovak writer
- Stanisława Ryster (1942–2024), Polish lawyer and presenter
- Stanislava Škvarková (born 1996), Czech opera singer
- Stanislava Součková (1923–1997), Czech singer
- Stanisława Szydłowska (born 1944), Polish canoeist
- Stanisława Tomczyk (1885–1975), Polish spiritual medium
- Stanislava Tsekova (born 1982), Bulgarian footballer
- Stanisława Umińska (1901–1977), Polish actress
- Stanisława Walasiewicz (1911–1980), Polish athlete
- Stanisława Wysocka (1877–1941), Polish actress
- Stanisława Zawadzka (1890–1988), Polish singer

== See also ==
- Stanislav (given name)
- Polish name
- Slavic names
