= Randi Lunnan =

Randi Lunnan (born 1963) is a Norwegian organizational theorist, and Professor at the Department of Strategy of the BI Norwegian Business School, known for her work on international strategic alliances and management of international corporations.

== Life and work ==
Lunnan obtained her MSc in Economics in 1988 at the Norwegian School of Economics, where she continued her graduate studies. She studied for a year at Harvard University in 1996, and back at the Norwegian School of Economics she obtained her PhD in 1999 with the thesis entitled "Strategic Flexibility and Alliances".

After graduation Lunnan started her academic career in 1999 at BI Norwegian Business School as Associate Professor at the Department of Strategy and Logistics. She directed the MSc program in strategy and the MBA education in China. In 2008 she was appointed Full Professor.

Lunnan research interests are in the field of "strategic alliances and international organisation... [particularly] how alliances evolve over time, and specifically what affects the sharing of knowledge and rejuvenation of alliances."

== Selected publications ==
- Lunnan, Randi. Strategic Flexibility and Alliances. PhD thesis Norwegian School of Economics, 1999.

Articles, a selection:

- Lunnan, Randi, and Sven A. Haugland. "Predicting and measuring alliance performance: A multidimensional analysis." Strategic Management Journal 29.5 (2008): 545-556.
- Becerra, Manuel, Randi Lunnan, and Lars Huemer. "Trustworthiness, risk, and the transfer of tacit and explicit knowledge between alliance partners." Journal of Management Studies 45.4 (2008): 691-713.
- Benito, Gabriel R.G., Lunnan, Randi and Tomassen, Sverre, "Distant Encounters of the Third Kind: Multinational Companies Locating Divisional Headquarters Abroad", Journal of Management Studies, 48(2), 2011, 373-394.
