= Nordic Summer University =

The Nordic Summer University (NSU) is a Nordic and Baltic Network for Interdisciplinary Study and Research. It is organised as a Swedish non-profit organisation. Nordic Summer University is ran on a voluntary basis, and follows democratic and horizontal principles of organising. The main organ of decision-making is the general assembly which takes place yearly at the summer school. The horizontal, volunteer-run structure is a rare example of democratic organising at an academic institution.

Until 2020 the Nordic Summer University was funded through the Nordic Council of Ministers, organizing study circles in the social and human sciences, mainly for PhD students or post-doctoral scholars from the Nordic countries. The activity is organized in a maximum of ten study circles. Separate winter seminars are held for each study circle, and a more extensive summer conference is organised for all the study circles, in a different location within the Nordic countries each year.

The interdisciplinary groups in the circles meet twice a year in order to discuss a wide range of topics, primarily within the humanistic and the social sciences. During the main summer event, all circles join for a week of academic discussion. Until 2020, the activities were sponsored by the Nordic Council, with financial oversight performed by Foreningerne NORDENs Forbund (FNF).

The study circles have been conducted since 1950 and have in the past involved debates between several leading intellectuals, politicians, and scholars of the Nordic countries, including Niels Bohr, Johan Fjord Jensen, Mauno Koivisto, Johan Galtung, Jostein Gripsrud, and Horace Engdahl. The focus of the research network is interdisciplinary and multicultural. In its statutes, NSU states that it is committed to introducing foreign ideas and influences that not yet have a foothold in the region's universities.

NSU had a publishing house, NSU Press, with distribution secured through Århus University Press.
