= Camargo Society =

The Camargo Society was a London society which created and produced ballet between 1930 and 1933, giving opportunity to British musicians, choreographers, designers and dancers. Its influence was disproportionate to its short life. Dame Ninette de Valois, founder of The Royal Ballet, saw it as "having done much for the cause of English ballet", and Encyclopædia Britannica Online credits it with "keeping ballet alive in England during the early 1930s". The society was named after the eighteenth-century French dancer Marie Anne de Cupis de Camargo.

== The scene in 1930 ==
Ballets Russes had held a London season most years but when Sergei Diaghilev died in 1929 the company collapsed, heavily in debt. Its successor company had not yet been formed. Pavlova's company had given its last London season ever, as it was to die with Pavlova herself in January 1931. Marie Rambert only started the small scale Ballet Club (later Ballet Rambert) in the autumn of 1930 with its first performance in 1931, and Ninette de Valois was to found the Vic-Wells (later the Royal Ballet) in 1931 with 6 salaried dancers. International Ballet and the Festival Ballet were years away. Britain's best known dancers Alicia Markova and Anton Dolin had been in England since the collapse of Ballets Russes but had no large scale company to dance for. In 1930 serious professional ballet in London was at a low point and in the rest of the country was non-existent.

== Formation ==
The Camargo Society was conceived by Arnold Haskell (ballet critic and prolific author), Phillip J. S. Richardson (editor of Dancing Times) and Edwin Evans (music critic), and named after the 18th century ballerina Marie Camargo who first shortened her skirts and wore dancing slippers without heels. Its aim was "to perpetuate the principles on which Diaghilev had run the Ballets Russes, as a fusion of dance, music and decor", encouraging British talent to create ballet on a scale that could not be attempted by the Ballet Club or the fledgling Vic-Wells. The society intended to put on several Sunday evening and Monday afternoon performances each season at a West End theatre, commissioning the choreography and decor for each ballet and hiring an orchestra for each performance. The necessary funds would be provided by a subscription audience. The committee included the young composer Constant Lambert as resident conductor, the semi-retired ballerina Lydia Lopokova as choreographic advisor and her husband the eminent economist John Maynard Keynes as treasurer. Haskell himself described the society as “a management without a company”.

== Productions ==
The society's first performance, at the Cambridge Theatre in October 1930, was a mixed programme of one-act ballets. The one received best was Pomona by the rising choreographer Frederick Ashton, in which Anton Dolin partnered the American ballerina Anna Ludmila in the lead roles. Ashton also created pieces for the December performance at the Arts Theatre Club; Job, A Masque of Poetry and Music, of which the critics did not know what to make, and a series of tableaux illustrating Shakespeare's narrative poem A Lover's Complaint in which Lopokova herself took a part. In total the Camargo Society produced 16 new one-act ballets.

Façade, also by Ashton to William Walton's existing score of the same name, is the one that lived longest and is still remembered today. It later went into the repertoires of both the Ballet Club and the Vic-Wells, but the Vic-Wells lost their Façade sets and costumes when they fled Holland in May 1940 hours ahead of the German occupation.

After several more modest ventures the society hired the Savoy Theatre in 1932 for an ambitious four week summer season, in which Olga Spessivtseva danced the lead parts in shortened versions of Giselle and Swan Lake. The other productions were Ballade (Chopin), The Enchanted Grove (Ravel), Fete polonaise (Mikhail Glinka), High Yellow (Spike Hughes), Job (Vaughan Williams), The Lord of Burleigh (Mendelssohn), Mars and Venus (Scarlatti), Mercure (Satie), The Origin of Design (Handel), Regatta (Gavin Gordon) and The Rio Grande (Constant Lambert). This enterprise put the society seriously in debt. Its debts were cleared with two gala performances of Coppélia at the Royal Opera House in June 1933 when the major stars Markova, Dolin and Lopokova danced to full houses, including the then Queen, members of the government and a visiting international conference of economists.

== The end of the society ==
This however was the society's last venture. Ninette de Valois' company was now firmly established and tackling larger productions than the Ballet Club could, and to the Vic-Wells the society bequeathed all its sets and productions except Façade. Constant Lambert went to the Vic-Wells as musical director and stayed until he died in 1951. Frederick Ashton went as resident choreographer and stayed to become Director when de Valois retired, as well as a choreographer of world repute. Alicia Markova and Anton Dolin went there as principal dancers. They only stayed 2 years, but by the time they moved on to form their own company Robert Helpmann and Harold Turner and the 16-year-old Margot Fonteyn were able to take on their roles. The Vic-Wells would perhaps have grown to the stature of the Royal Ballet without the Camargo Society, but there is no doubt that the Camargo Society helped the Vic-Wells considerably in its formative phase.
