= Spike Hughes =

British musician, composer, broadcaster and author (1908–1987)

Patrick Cairns "Spike" Hughes (19 October 1908 – 2 February 1987) was a British musician, composer and arranger involved in the worlds of classical music and jazz. He has been called Britain's earliest jazz composer, and was a pioneer of television opera. Later in his career, he became better known as a broadcaster and humorous author.

== Early career ==
Born in London, England, Hughes was the son of Irish composer, writer and song collector Herbert Hughes and great grandson of the sculptor Samuel Peploe Wood. His childhood, spent mostly with his mother Lilian Meacham (1886–1973), a Harley Street psychiatrist, involved extensive travelling in France and Italy, as well as a more settled period of education at Perse School in Cambridge. In 1923, at the age of 15 he spent an extended period in Vienna, studying composition with Egon Wellesz. While there he claimed to have visited the opera nearly 450 times, always standing at the back of the gallery with a score in his hand. He also began writing his first music criticism for The Times of London. And he heard his first jazz, at the Weinberg Bar, Weihburggasse, a band led by trumpeter Arthur Briggs. Returning to the UK in 1926, Hughes had a solo cello sonata performed in London, and wrote the incidental music for two theatre productions in Cambridge.

== Jazz ==
His interest in jazz was stimulated by the London revue Blackbirds, starring Florence Mills and Edith Wilson, in September 1926. It was an enthusiasm he shared with his friends, the composers Constant Lambert and William Walton and the conductor Hyam Greenbaum. Hughes taught himself double bass (using a German string bass made of tin, the spike of which led to his nickname) and formed his own jazz group in 1930. The group was one of the earliest artists signed to Decca Records in England, and over 30 sessions were recorded between 1930 and 1933. Originally billed as Spike Hughes and his Decca-Dents, he reportedly did not like the name and after three sessions it was changed either to "his Dance Orchestra" or "his Three Blind Mice" for smaller sessions.

Hughes used the Chenil Galleries, King's Road, Chelsea as his recording venue, and in April 1930 persuaded the visiting Jimmy Dorsey to visit Chelsea for some sessions. These records were used as the basis for the "hastily assembled" jazz ballet High Yellow, put on by the Camargo Society at the Savoy Theatre in London, June 1932. Choreography for the ballet was by Frederick Ashton and Buddy Bradley. The title comes from the once widely used, now discredited term high yellow, describing mixed black and white ancestry.

From 1931, Hughes played regularly with the Jack Hylton Band. But his career in jazz culminated in 1933 with a visit to New York, where he arranged three recording sessions involving members of Benny Carter's and Luis Russell's orchestras with Coleman Hawkins and Henry "Red" Allen from Fletcher Henderson's band. These fourteen sides were predominantly Hughes' own compositions. Most were not released in America at the time, but are now considered classics of their era. Charles Fox picks out Arabesque in particular, with its alternating themes, as showing "the heights to which he could rise". Hughes himself gives a detailed account of these sessions in his autobiographies.

Some of his jazz pieces show the influence of Irish folk melodies and his father Herbert Hughes (Donegal Cradle Song). Others are clearly inspired by the work of Duke Ellington (A Harlem Symphony, first tried out on William Walton's piano at No 2 Carlyle Square). Hughes, along with Constant Lambert, met and socialised with Ellington when he was in London in 1933.

== Later career ==
After the New York recordings, Hughes ceased performing jazz. He orchestrated and conducted shows for C B Cochran and (using the pseudonym "Mike") wrote jazz reviews for Melody Maker (1931–1944), The Daily Herald (1933–1936) and The Times (1957–1967), as well as establishing performance and recording opportunities for American bands in England. He wrote radio plays accompanied by his own musical scores for the BBC, such as Nikki Makes News (1937). He renewed his interest in opera and classical music, through writing and broadcasting, conducting the BBC Theatre Orchestra, and through composing his own operas, including Cinderella (1938) and St Patrick's Day (1947) for BBC Television (perhaps the first television operas to be broadcast), as well as a musical, Frankie and Johnny, televised in 1950.

Hughes was one of the first music critics to visit the early performances at Glyndebourne Festival Opera in 1934, and made many contributions to Glyndebourne in subsequent years, including writing programme notes, providing subtitles for television performances, and writing the first history of Glyndebourne Opera which was published in 1965.

== Author ==
As a writer, regular BBC broadcaster and critic his subjects also included food and travel. Out of Season (1955) is a travelogue describing a winter journey by train and boat from London to Sicily, with time spent in Vienna, Venice, Milan, Parma, Florence, Naples, Palermo. Catania, Genoa, Turin and Dieppe. The journey also served as the research trip for his next book, Great Opera Houses (1956). The two volumes of autobiography are particularly valuable for the information they include on his contemporaries. In between the more serious works, Hughes produced his series of "The Art of Coarse...." studies which opened with The Art of Coarse Cricket in 1954 and was followed over the years by ...Coarse Travel, ...Gardening, ...Bridge, ...Cookery and ..Entertaining. The series was named as a play on coarse fishing; other later Coarse books were written by Michael Green.

== Personal life ==
Hughes married Margery Pargeter in 1931 but the marriage ended in divorce, as did his second, to radio announcer (Sybil) Barbara Mcfadyean (1917–2006) in 1945 - she was the first announcer of the original Overseas Forces programme. He married his third wife Charmian (née Finch Noyes) in 1954; the couple moved from London to a 17th-century farmhouse at Ringmer, Sussex, near Glynde, where they lived until he died in 1987. She survived him and died in 2003.

His much younger half-sister Helena Hughes (born 1928) was an actress who Lucian Freud used as a model for Girl with a Beret in 1951. She appeared in the first production of Look Back in Anger in 1956. His other half-sister Angela wrote the memoir Chelsea Footprints in 2008.

== Compositions ==
- Who is Sylvia, song (c 1922)
- Pictures Unframed, piano solo (published Curwen, 1925)
- Sonata for Solo Cello (1926, published Curwen, 1928)
- Love for Love (Congreve) incidental music (1926)
- The Player Queen (Yeats) incidental music (1927)
- High Yellow, ballet (1932)
- I Scream Too Much, musical satire (1936)
- Beyond the Stars (Molnar, based on The Swan), incidental music (1937)
- Nikki Makes News, radio play with music (1937)
- Bianca, a Romance with Music (Max Kester, Anthony Hall) (1938)
- Cinderella, opera for television (1938)
- Vocal Girl Makes Good, a Familiar Comedy with Music (1938)
- Venetia's Wedding, radio comedy with songs (1939) (musical continuity, Jack Beaver)
- St Patrick's Day (Sheridan), opera for television (1947)
- Frankie and Johnny, musical (1950)
- The Moon Through the Window, radio play with music (1950)
- Overture: The Masterdrinkers (1957, originally written for the ITMA radio programme)

=== Jazz recordings ===
- Spike Hughes and his Dance (Negro) Orchestra
  - Harlem Madness and Blue Turning Grey Over You, Decca F1861 (1930)
  - A Harlem Symphony (parts one and two), Decca F2711 (1931)
  - Six Bells Stampede and Sirocco, Decca F2844 (1932)
  - Nocturne and Someone Stole Gabriel's Horn, Decca F3563 (1933)
  - Pastoral and Bugle Call Rag, Decca F3606 (1933)
  - Arabesque and Fanfare, Decca F3639 (1933)
  - Donegal Cradle Song and Firebird, Decca F3717 (1933)
- Spike Hughes and his All American Orchestra, Decca LK 4173 (1957)
  - The 14 sides recorded in New York with Benny Carter on 18 April and 18 and 19 May 1933 were:
    - (18 April): Nocturne, Someone Stole Gabriel's Horn, Pastorale, Bugle Call Rag,
    - (18 May): Arabesque, Fanfare, Sweet Sorrow Blues, Music at Midnight, Sweet Sue.
    - (19 May): Air in D flat, Donegal Cradle Song, Firebird, Music at Sunrise, How come you do me like you do?
- Spike Hughes, His Orchestra, Three Blind Mice and Decca-Dents (Kings Cross Music, early 1930s, four volumes, 1980s reissues)
- Spike Hughes: All His Jazz Compositions (including High Yellow), Largo CD, 1999
- Spike Hughes and Benny Carter 1933, Retrieval, 2009
- Spike Hughes and his Negro Orchestra 1933 - The Complete Set, Retrieval RTR 79005 (2012)

=== Film scores ===
- Fiddler's Three (1944)
- A Yank Comes Back (1949) (Crown Film Unit)
- Lancashire Coast (1957) (British Transport Films)
- The Double Bond (1961) (Greenpark Productions)
- A Flourish of Tubes (1961) (Greenpark Productions)

== Books ==
- Opening Bars – Beginning an Autobiography (Pilot Press Ltd, London, 1946)
- Second Movement – Continuing the Autobiography (Museum Press, London, 1951)
- Out of Season – A Traveller's Tale of a Winter Journey (Robert Hale, 1955)
- Great Opera Houses (Weidenfeld & Nicolson, London, 1956)
- Famous Mozart Operas (1958, 2nd edition (Dover) 1972) ISBN 0-486-22858-4
- The Toscanini Legacy (Putnam & Co, 1959)
- Famous Puccini Operas (1962, 2nd edition (Dover) 1972) ISBN 0-486-22857-6
- Glyndebourne, A History of the Festival Opera (Methuen, London, 1965)
- Famous Verdi Operas (Robert Hale, London, 1968) ISBN 0-7091-0205-4

=== "Coarse" books ===
- The Art of Coarse Cricket: a study of its principles, traditions and practice (Museum Press, 1954; repr. Hutchinson, 1961)
- The Art of Coarse Travel (Museum Press, 1957)
- The Art of Coarse Gardening: or the care and feeding of slugs (Hutchinson, 1968)
- The Art of Coarse Bridge (Hutchinson, 1970)
- The Art of Coarse Entertaining (Hutchinson, 1972)
- The Art of Coarse Language (Hutchinson, 1974)
