= Geir Gripsrud =

Norwegian business theorist

Geir Gripsrud (born 1946) is a Norwegian organizational theorist, and Professor of Marketing at BI Norwegian Business School in Oslo. He is known for his work on international marketing, market entry strategy and distribution channels.

== Life and work ==
After his graduation, Gripsrud was marketing researcher at the Norwegian Fund for Market and Distribution Research (NFMDR) in Oslo, where in 1972 he wrote his first report entitled "On long-range planning in retailing." Around 1985, he became marketing researcher at the Export Council of Norway, the Norwegian Trade Council.

In the 1980s, he was appointed research professor of marketing at the BI Norwegian Business School, and in the 1990s also Dean of Bachelor Studies.

His brother, Jostein Gripsrud is Professor in Media Studies at the University of Bergen.

== Publications ==
Gripsrud has authored and co-authored numerous publications in his fields of expertise. Articles, a selection:

- Gripsrud, Geir, and Kjell Grønhaug. "Structure and strategy in grocery retailing: A sociometric approach." The Journal of Industrial Economics 33.3 (1985): 339–347.
- Gripsrud, Geir. "The determinants of export decisions and attitudes to a distant market: Norwegian fishery exports to Japan." Journal of International Business Studies (1990): 469–485.
- Benito, Gabriel R.G. and Gripsrud, Geir, "The Expansion of Foreign Direct Investments: Discrete Rational Location Choices or a Cultural Learning Process?", Journal of International Business Studies, 23(3), 1992, 461–476.
- Gripsrud, Geir, and Gabriel R.G. Benito. "Internationalization in retailing: modeling the pattern of foreign market entry." Journal of Business Research 58.12 (2005): 1672–1680.
- Gripsrud, Geir, Marianne Jahre, and Gøran Persson. "Supply chain management–back to the future?." International Journal of Physical Distribution & Logistics Management 36.8 (2006): 643–659.
