= Krasimir =

- Gender: male
- Language: Bulgarian

Origin
- Meaning: krasi ("beautiful") + mir ("world" or "peace")

Other names
- Alternative spelling: Krassimir
- Variant forms: Krasi, Krasyo (Краси, Красьо)

Krasimir (Bulgarian: Красимир) is a common masculine given name in Bulgaria. It is derived from the words: krasi "beauty, adornment", and mir "peace" or "world". An alternate spelling is Krassimir. The feminine form is: Krasimira / Krassimira (Красимира). The name may refer to:

== Krasimir ==
- Krasimir Balakov (born 1966), Bulgarian former footballer turned manager
- Krasimir Bezinski, former Bulgarian football player
- Krasimir Borisov (born 1950), Bulgarian football midfielder
- Krasimir Dimitrov (born 1971), Bulgarian footballer
- Krasimir Georgiev (born 1986), Bulgarian footballer
- Krasimir Khristov (born 1953), Bulgarian sprint canoeist
- Krasimir Kochev (1974–2025), Bulgarian freestyle wrestler
- Krasimir Kolev (born 1971), Bulgarian goalkeeper
- Krasimir Krastev (footballer) (born 1984), association football player from Bulgaria
- Krasimir Radkov (born 1971), Bulgarian comedy actor (television and theatre)
- Krasimir Zafirov (born 1950), retired Bulgarian football player and now coach

== Krassimir ==
- Krassimir Atanassov (born 1954), Bulgarian mathematician
- Krassimir Avramov (born 1969), singer and songwriter
- Krassimir Chomakov (born 1977), Bulgarian football player
- Krassimir Damianov (1948–2015), Bulgarian writer and civil engineer
- Krassimir Guergov (born 1961), Bulgarian businessman
- Krassimir Taskov (born 1955), Bulgarian pianist and composer

== See also ==
- Krešimir
- Krzesimir
- Krassi

== Other ==
- Krasimir, village in Dalgopol Municipality, Varna Province, Bulgaria
