= Primož Repar =

Slovene writer

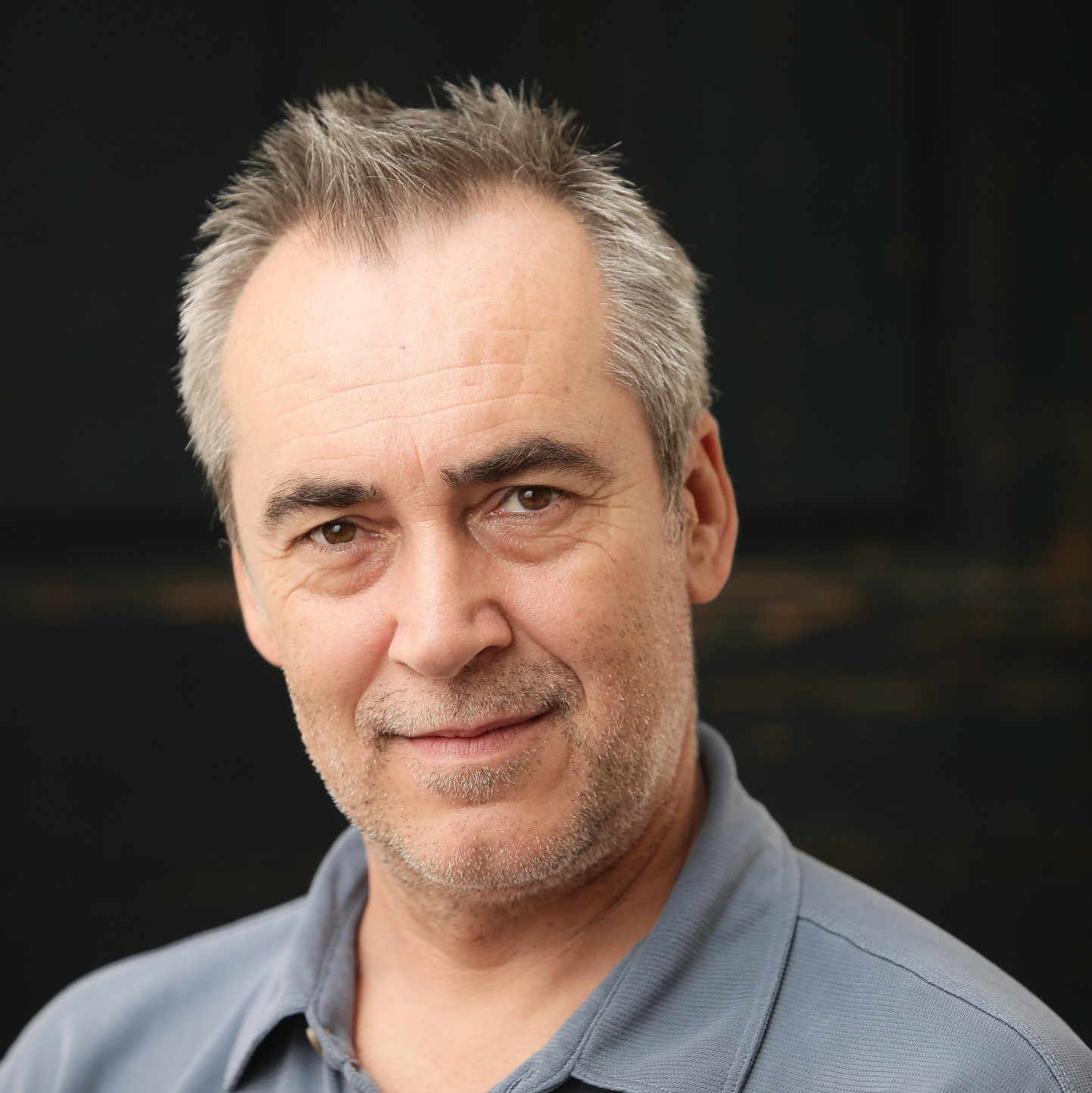

Primož Repar (born 16 June 1967, Ljubljana) is a Slovenian poet, writer, philosopher, translator, essayist, editor, publisher and organizer of international cultural and scientific / professional events, workshops, festivals, conferences, symposia, various scientific and professional research, and other initiatives at home and abroad.

== Education ==
He studied philosophy and history at the Faculty of Arts, University of Ljubljana in 1997. From 2001 on studying graduate for a doctor's degree in researching the philosophy of Søren Kierkegaard. In 2009 he obtained a Ph.D. with the title Kierkegaard: The Question of Choice and Existential Communication at the Faculty of Arts, University of Ljubljana. In 1993 he studied at International Peoples’ College in Elsingore, Denmark (Danish language intensive course).

== Work ==
Repar is co-founder of the Publishing house KUD Apokalipsa and has been the chief editor since its inception in 1993. He has been responsible for printing more than 300 books and 300 number of magazines in 28 years. He is director of Central European Research Institute Søren Kierkegaard Ljubljana since 2013. At the same time, he coordinates the international Philosophic Symposium of Miklavž Ocepek since its foundation and the major central European and Southeast European literary project "Revija v reviji (Review within Review)" since 2002. He is also one of the founders of The Slovene haiku association, active in founding World Haiku Association.[8/7] He is the head organizer of festivals (Slovene and International Haiku festivals, Slovene-Danish festival), international relations, meetings, financing, editor of some of the literature and philosophy editions. He is Slovenian leading professional of Kierkegaard in Slovenia. He is also a member of several international editorial boards, including the journals of the Slovak Academy of Sciences Filozofia and Acte Kierkegaardiane. He has been in advisory board of philosophical review of Slovac Academy of Science Filozofia since 2012 and he was also in advisory board of the international cultural review Orient Express (Great Britain, 2002–2006).

He wrote his first collection of poems, The Cross and the Hammer, in 1984–1987. It is a kind of subversive poetic manifesto of "punk diversion" with existentially colored poetry. There are also traces of the first reading of the Danish philosopher, Søren Kierkegaard, the founder of existentialism and the inspirer of many contemporary philosophical, theological, literary and interdisciplinary fields. He began writing Haiku poetry during his stay in Denmark, where he also became a member of the Kierkegaard Society. After returning from Denmark he became a member of the Danish-Slovenian Friendship Society and the Slovenian Haiku Society. He has been a member of the Slovene Writers' Association since 1997 and he was also a member of its managing board in 2020.

As an independent researcher and head of professional programs at the Central European Research Institute Søren Kierkegaard collaborates and occasionally lectures at many European universities and institutes, and his Existential Revolution has so far been published in five languages (English, French, Slovak, Polish and Slovene). He also published the first monographies of Søren Kierkegaard in Slovene language in two books: Kierkegaard – the Question of Choice and Kierkegaard – Existential Communication. In 2018, he attended the 24th World Philosophical Congress in Beijing, China, where he lectured on the "Politics of Love" and co-organized lectures in the field of tables related to Kierkegaard's thought.

Some of his books were nominated for the highest national awards for literature or essayistic books (2001 – award of Marjan Rožanc, 2008 – award of Simon Jenko). As editor and publisher he was awarded at the International Publishers Meeting in Croatia (Put u središte Europe, 2007) as the best editor/publisher of the year, as editor and poet also in Romania (Arad, 2011), as editor and international collaborator in Bosnia and Hercegovina (Banja Luka, 2013). He has received a special award of dean of Faculty of Arts Constantine the Philosopher University in Nitra, Slovakia. In March of 2014 he received a medallion of St. Olaf College (Minnesota, USA) for excellent organisation of 4th International Philosophical Symposium od Miklavž Ocepek in honor of the bicentennial of the birth of Søren Kierkegaard that took place in 2013 in Slovenia.

He has compiled or edited several anthologies of poetry in Slovene, international editions and the Montenegrin language, as well as Slovene contemporary philosophy in the Czech language (Nová oikonomie vztahů). He also edited the Slovenian bibliography on Kierkegaard for the world edition at Routledge (2017). His 14 books and independent monographs have so far been published in Slovene, Slovak, Czech, English, French, Croatian, Montenegrin, Serbian, Macedonian, Polish, Hungarian and Danish. In addition to Danish, he translates professional and literary texts from Croatian, Serbian, Slovak, Czech, English and Norwegian.

== Personal life ==
From 2001 to 2015 he was married to the poet Stanislava Repar.

== Selected bibliography ==
=== Poetry ===
Križ in kladivo (The Cross and the Hammer). Ljubljana: Artus, 1992. COBISS 69764864

Onkraj sveta je krhka pajčevina (Beyond this World is a Fragile Cobweb). Ljubljana: Emonika, 1994.

Repar, Primož (1995). Molitvenik/The Prayer Book (1st ed.). Ljubljana: Apokalipsa. ISBN 961-90188-1-8.

Repar, Primož (1996). Mors Barbarourum (1st ed.). Ljubljana: Litterapicta. ISBN 961-6030-18-3.

Repar, Primož (2012). Alkimija srčnega utripa/Heart Rate Alchemy (1st ed.). Ljubljana: Littera picta. ISBN 978-961-6030-82-3.

Repar, Primož (2007). Šumi, ikoni/Woods, Icons (1st ed.). Skopje: Blesok. ISBN 978-9989-928-66-6.

Stanja darežljivosti (States of generosity). Ljubljana: Mladinska knjiga, 2008.COBISS 17453320

Repar, Primož (2013). Hipohondrija/Hypochondria (1st ed.). Banja Luka: Kuća peozije. ISBN 978-99938-48-72-1.

Repar, Primož (2017). Trije dnevi v Istri in en dan prej/Three Days in Istria and One Day Before (1st ed.). Ljubljana: Apokalipsa. ISBN 978-961-6894-89-0.

Repar, Primož (2018). Križ in kladivo/The Cross and the Hammer (2nd ed.). Ljubljana: Apokalipsa. ISBN 978-961-7054-04-0.

Primož Repar (2020). Trije dana u Istri i jedan dan prije. Nova istra, Istrski ogranak DHK.

=== Essays ===
Repar, Primož (2000). Spisi o apokalipsi/Writings on the Apocalypse (1st ed.). Ljubljana: Apokalipsa. ISBN 961-6314-15-7.

Singularity and The Existential Turn. European Journal of Science and Theology, 2012.

Repar, Primož (2019). Dar osebe: Kocbek, Gosar, Krek/Gift of Person: Kocbek, Gosar, Krek (1st ed.). Ljubljana: Apokalipsa. ISBN 978-961-7054-17-0.

Repar, Primož (2020). Dar osebe: o družabnosti/Gift of Person: About Sociability (1st ed.). Ljubljana: Apokalipsa. ISBN 978-961-7054-30-9.

=== Scientific monographs ===
Repar, Primož (2009). Kiekegaard - vprasanje izbire (1st ed.). Ljubljana: Apoklipsa. ISBN 978-961-6644-37-2.

Repar, Primož (2009). Kiekegaard - eksistencialna komunikacija (1st ed.). Ljubljana: Apoklipsa. ISBN -978-961-6644-38-9.

Repar, Primož (2013). Eksistencialna revolucija (1st ed.). Ljubljana: Apoklipsa. ISBN -978-961-6894-15-9.

Repar, Primož (2013). Nova oikonomija odnosov (1st ed.). Ljubljana: Apoklipsa. ISBN -978-961-6894-22-7.

Repar, Primož (2016). Decision and the Existential Turn (1st ed.). Toronto: Trinity College. ISBN -978-1-988129-03-7.

Repar, Primož (2017). Chciet nemožne alebo Skandalon rozhodnutia (1st ed.). Bratislava: Prešov: Vydavatel'stvo Michala Vlaška. ISBN 978-80-7165-993-8.

=== Translations of Kierkegaard's works ===
Kierkegaard, Soeren; Repar, Primož (1998). Dnevnik zapeljivca/Diary of Seducer (1st ed.). Ljubljana: Apokalipsa. ISBN 978-961-6894-24-1.

Kierkegaard, Soeren; Repar, Primož (1998). Pojem tesnobe/Concept of Anxiety (1st ed.). Ljubljana: Slovenska matica. ISBN 961-213-052-3.

Kierkegaard, Soeren, Repar, Primož. (September 2003). Ali-ali I. in II. del (1st ed.). Ljubljana: Študentska založba. p. 621. ISBN 961-6356-71-2.

Kierkegaard, Soeren; Repar, Primož (2005). Strah in trepet/Fear and Trambling (1st ed.). Ljubljana: Apokalipsa. ISBN 961-6314-77-7.

Kierkegaard, Soeren; Repar, Primož (2009). Etično religiozni razpravici/Two Minor Religious Essays (1st ed.). Ljubljana: Apokalipsa. ISBN 978-961-6644-44-0.

Kierkegaard, Soeren; Repar, Primož (2012). Z vidika mojega pisateljstva. Posamečnik/The Point of View For My Work as an Author (1st ed.). Ljubljana: Apokalipsa. ISBN 978-961-6894-07-4.

Kierkegaard, Soeren; Repar, Primož (2013). Dnevnik zapeljivca/Diary of Seducer (2nd ed.). Ljubljana: Apokalipsa. ISBN 978-961-6894-24-1.

Kierkegaard, Soeren; Repar, Primož (2013). Johannes Climacus or De omnibus Dubitandum est (1st ed.). Ljubljana: Apokalipsa. ISBN 978-961-6894-93-7.

Kierkegaard, Soeren; Repar, Primož (2018). Dve dobi: čas revolucije in sodobnost/Two Ages: The Present Age and Age of Revolution (1st ed.). Ljubljana: Apokalipsa. ISBN 978-961-7054-14-9.

=== Other translation works ===
Barthes, Roland; Repar, Primož (2003). Učna ura: nastopno predavanje na College de France 7. januarja 1977/Lesson: Inaugural Lecture at the College de France January 7, 1977 (1st ed.). Ljubljana: Apokalipsa. ISBN 978-961-7054-14-9.

Repar, Primož; Repar, Stanislava (2006). Iz skupne zime/From Common Winter (1st ed.). Ljubljana: Apokalipsa. ISBN 978-961-6644-00-6.

Repar, Primož; Paljetak, Luko (2008). Frizer za krizanteme/Hairdresser for Chrysanthemums (1st ed.). Ljubljana: Apokalipsa. ISBN 978-961-6644-25-9.

Repar, Primož; Starčević, Goran (2011). Volk v Supermarketu/Wolf in the Supermarket (1st ed.). Ljubljana: Apokalipsa. ISBN 978-961-6644-88-4.
