= Jasna Koteska =

Macedonian writer, philosopher and academic

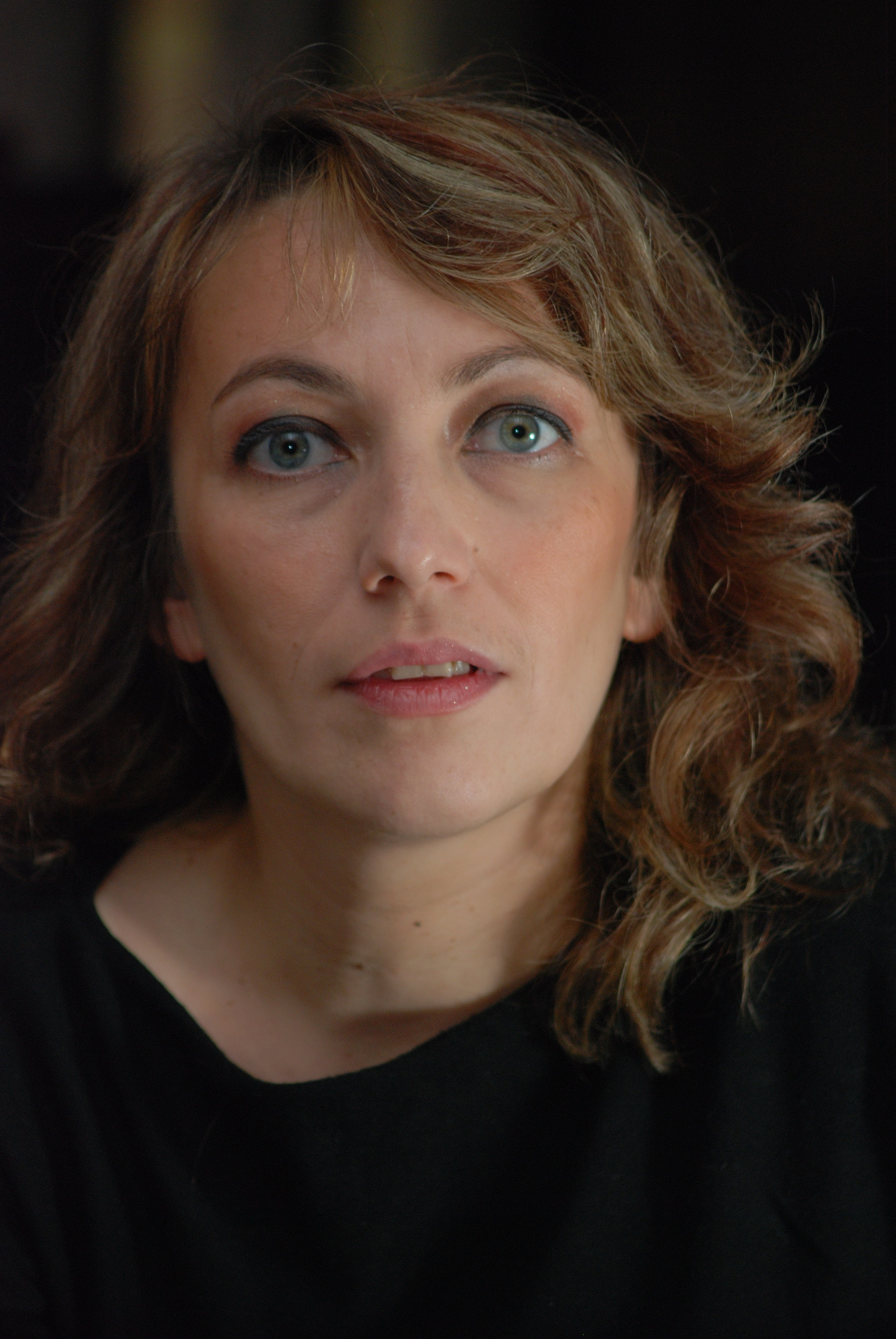
Koteska in 2008

Jasna Koteska (born 1970) is a Macedonian writer, philosopher and academic.

== Life ==
She was born in 1970 in Skopje. She holds master degrees in literature (University of Skopje) and in gender studies (Central European University, Budapest). She is a Professor (Tenure) in humanities at the Ss. Cyril and Methodius University of Skopje. Koteska works with 19th-century philosophy, Psychoanalytic Theory, and Gender studies. She has published books on Søren Kierkegaard, Sigmund Freud, and on a variety of topics related to psychoanalytic theory and gender studies. Her books have been published in Washington, D.C., Toronto, Ljubljana, Belgrade, Sofia and Skopje.

Her book Kierkegaard on Consumerism (Toronto & Ljubljana, 2016) received a 2017 Macedonian State Award for outstanding contribution in the field of science in the interest of the Republic of Macedonia. Her book Communist Intimacy (Washington, 2014) made it on to the European Society (Berlin and Paris) Author's Finnegan's List of 30 books for 2015. Her academic articles have been translated in several languages, including English, German, Slovene, Serbian, Turkish, Bulgarian, Albanian, Hungarian, Greek, Slovak, and Romanian. Koteska is editor for Kierkegaard Circle/Collection Aut at Trinity College Toronto, Canada and Central European Research Institute Soren Kierkegaard (CERI-SK), Ljubljana.

She is coordinator of the Study Circle 8, Futures of Education in the Anthropocene (2021–2023) for the Nordic Summer University.

In December 2022 she became an academician in the field of science of Academia Balkanica Europeana - United Balkans in United Europe by the General Electoral Assembly of Academia Balkanica Europeana held on 14 December 2022. It includes distinguished artists and scientific research experts from ten countries in the Balkans, and it was established in Bucharest in October 2017.

== Selected works ==
=== Books ===
- Kierkegaard on Consumerism. The Aesthetic, The Ethical and the Religious Reading, Toronto and Ljubljana: Kierkegaard Circle/Collection Aut, 2016. ISBN 978-1-988129-02-0
- The Freud Reader. Early Psychoanalysis 1983-1899, Skopje: Kultura, 2013. ISBN 978-9989-32-713-1
- Communist Intimacy, Washington: New Academia Publishing, 2014. ISBN 0989916979
- Sanitary Enigma, Skopje: Templum, 2006. ISBN 9989-902-87-9 (Bulgarian translation Sofia: KX Critique and Humanism, 2012. ISBN 9989-902-87-9) (Reprint, Skopje: Antolog, 2020. ISBN 9786082434131)
- Intimist, Ljubljana: Apokalipsa, 2008. ISBN 978-961-6644-30-3
- Macedonian Women's Writings, Skopje: Makedonska kniga, 2003. ISBN 9989-46-047-7
- Postmodern Literary Studies, Skopje: Makedonska kniga, 2002. ISBN 9989-46-019-1

=== As editor ===
- The Ethnologist as a Writer: The Writer as an Ethnologist, (co-editor with Ilina Jakimovska), Skopje: Tabahon, 2020. ISBN 9786084566229
- Representation of Gender Minority Groups in Media: Serbia, Montenegro and Macedonia, (co-editor with Tatjana Rosic-Ilic and Janko Ljumovic), Belgrade: Faculty of Media and Communication, 2015. ISBN 978-86-87107-54-0
- Veseliot den ili Maticek se zeni, (editor), Skopje: Faculty of Philology, 2008. ISBN 9989724636
