= Ivanković =

Ivanković (Serbian: Иванковић) is a South Slavic surname, derived from the male given name Ivanko. Notable people with the surname include:

- Antun Ivanković (born 1939), Croatian rower
- Branko Ivanković (born 1954), Croatian football manager
- Ivanka Ivanković (born 1966), witness to alleged apparitions
- Jack Ivankovic (born 2007), Canadian ice hockey player
- Jerko Ivanković Lijanović (born 1969), Bosnian politician
- Jure Ivanković (born 1985), Bosnian football manager
- Krešimir Ivanković (born 1977), Croatian handballer
- Luca Ivanković (born 1987), Croatian basketballer
- Mario Ivanković (born 1975), Bosnian and Croatian football manager
- Mladen Ivanković-Lijanović (born 1960), Bosnian politician
- Nenad Ivanković (born 1948), Croatian journalist
- Nives Ivanković (born 1967), Croatian actress
- Vedran Ivanković (born 1983), Croatian footballer
- Vicka Ivanković (born 1964), witness to alleged apparitions
- Zlatko Ivanković (born 1952), Croatian football manager
- Željko Ivanković (born 1954), Croatian writer
