= Ludmila =

Ludmila, Ludmilla, Liudmila, Liudmyla, Lyudmila, or Lyudmyla (Cyrillic: Людмила, romanized: Lyudmila) may refer to:

== People and fictional characters ==
- Ludmila (given name) a Slavic female given name, including a list of people and fictional characters with the name
- Ludmila (footballer) (born 1994), Brazilian footballer Ludmila da Silva
- Ludmilla (singer), Brazilian singer and songwriter Ludmila Oliveira da Silva (born 1995)
- Ludmila of Bohemia, 9th century saint of the Orthodox Church
- Ludmila Belousova, Soviet figure skater and Olympian (1935—2017)
- Ludmila Berlinskaya, Russian concert pianist and actress (born 1960)
- Ludmila Janovská (1907 – after 1962), Czech painter
- Ludmilla Tourischeva, former Soviet gymnast and Olympian (born 1952)
- Anna Ludmilla, American ballerina born Jean Marie Kaley (1903–1990)
- Ludmila Hraznova, Belarusian economist, opposition politician, and human rights defender (born 1953)

== Places ==
- Ludmilla, Northern Territory, Australia, a suburb of the city of Darwin
- 675 Ludmilla, an asteroid

== Other uses ==
- Ludmila, nickname of the DR Class 130 family locomotive
