= High Yellow (ballet) =

1930s jazz ballet

- Choreographer: Buddy Bradley, with the assistance of Frederick Ashton
- Music: Spike Hughes
- Premiere: 6 June 1932; Savoy Theatre, London
- Design: William Chappell

High Yellow is a one-act ballet by Buddy Bradley with the assistance of Frederick Ashton, to the music of Spike Hughes. The ballet was first given by the Camargo Society at the Savoy Theatre, on 6 June 1932. It is notable for being the first jazz-ballet, for the choreography by Buddy Bradley, and the set designs by Vanessa Bell.

It was from High Yellow that Alicia Markova gained the nickname "snake hips" for what she was taught by Bradley.

Duncan Grant had been invited to design the set for the production of Swan Lake by the Camargo Society in 1932, and, for the production of High Yellow in the same season, he recommended Vanessa Bell. She produced a tropical design of palms, boats and a cocktail bar. Bell's curtain design for High Yellow was sold at auction in 2023.

Costumes were designed by William Chappell; a 1993 exhibition of 20th-century set and costume designs for dance at Central Saint Martins included two by Chappell, one of which was from High Yellow. The music was written by Spike Hughes, based on a recording he and Jimmy Dorsey had undertaken at the Chenil Gallery in 1930. It was performed by the London Symphony Orchestra, with nine additional jazz musicians.

According to Andy Simons, the title High Yellow was a compromise "as well as a slight wink to the fact that, exclusively, white stage performers would be dancing to a white composer's intended Negro music".

== Synopsis ==
High Yellow is a one-act ballet of six scenes. The subject of the ballet is low life in Florida, set in the seaport of Coral Gables.

The numbers as danced in the original production are:

- Foreword
- Sirocco
- Six Bells Stampede
- Elegy
- Weary Traveller
- Finale, from A Harlem Symphony

The ballet has not been revived, but Hughes's music was released as part of a compilation CD in 1994.

== Original cast ==
- Mammy: Ursula Moreton
- Pappy: Hedley Briggs
- Bambu (Their Son): Frederick Ashton
- Mabel, Edna, Pansy and Ninon (His Sisters): Sheila McCarthy, Freda Bamford, Betty Cuff, Nadina Newhouse
- Violetta and Cleo (His Sweethearts): Alicia Markova, Doris Sonne
- Violetta's languishing friends: Beatrice Appleyard, Maude Lloyd, Elisabeth Schooling, Joy Newton, Felicity Andreae, Mary Skeaping, Joan Day
- Cleo's gay friends: Ailne Phillips, Sylvia Willins, Laura Wilson, Kathleen Crofton, Andrée Howard, Dot Rickinson, Prudence Hyman
- Joey and Eddy (Two Strangers): William Chappell, Walter Gore

== Critical reception ==
Carlo Denari in The Era declared that the ballet "would be a hit in any music-hall programme"' It was described by the Daily Express as "the sensation of the evening".
