= Ivanko =

Ivanko is a Slavic given name and a surname, a diminutive from the given name Ivan, a Slavic variant of the name "John". It may be a transliteration from Иванко or Иванько.

Notable people with the name include:

== Given name ==
- Ivanko (boyar), boyar, killer of Tsar Ivan Asen I and rebel
- Ivanko (despot), ruler of the Despotate of Dobruja from 1385 to 1389, and again from 1393 to 1399
- Ivanko Farolfi (1892–1945), lawyer and Croatian and Yugoslavian politician

== Surname ==
- Sophia Ivanko, a contestant from Ukraine in the Junior Eurovision Song Contest 2019
- Vitaliy Ivanko (born 1992), Ukrainian footballer

== Fictional characters ==
- Ivanko, from "Ivanko, the Bear's Son", English translation of a Russian adaptation of the French tale Jean de l'Ours

== Other ==
- Ivanko (album), 2020 album by Anna Lesko; see Anna Lesko discography
- "Ivanko, the Killer of Asen I" (a.k.a. Ivanko; Bulgarian: Иванко), 1872 play by Kliment of Tarnovo
- Ivanko (TV series), Russian comedy TV series

== See also ==
- Alternate forms for the name John
- Ivanka (disambiguation)
- Ivan (disambiguation)
