= Gabriel R. G. Benito =

Norwegian economist

Gabriel Robertstad Garcia Benito (born 1960) is a Norwegian economist, Professor of Strategy and International Business and a previous Dean of Doctoral Studies at BI Norwegian Business School, in Oslo, Norway. He is known for his work on foreign direct investments.

== Biography ==
Benito graduated from BI Norwegian Business School in 1984, and did his postgraduate studies at Norwegian School of Economics, where he obtained his MA in 1992 and PhD in 1995.

Benito has been affiliated with several academic institutions including: Copenhagen Business School, Norwegian School of Economics, Østfold University College, and University of Agder.

Benito has held visiting positions at Copenhagen Business School, Henley Business School at University of Reading, University of Melbourne, and University of Valencia, and taught inter alia at Helsinki School of Economics (now Aalto University), Technical University of Lisbon (ISEG), University of Oslo, and University of Valencia. In 2005, he was President of the European International Business Academy (EIBA).

He was elected a Fellow of Academy of International Business in 2015, and Fellow of European International Business Academy in 2017.

Benito's research has focused on foreign direct investment, the structure and behavior of multinational enterprises and their foreign subsidiaries, and foreign operation methods.

== Selected publications ==
Benito is the author of numerous publications. Books:

- Benito, Gabriel R.G., L.S. Welch and B. Petersen (2018) Foreign Operation Methods: Theory, Analysis, Strategy, 2nd edition. Edward Elgar.
- Benito, Gabriel R.G. with R. Narula, eds. (2007) Multinationals on the Periphery Palgrave.
- Benito, Gabriel R.G. and H.R. Greve, eds. (2007) Progress in International Business Research, Vol. 1 Elsevier.

Articles, a selection:

- Iurkov, Viacheslav and Benito, Gabriel R.G., "Domestic Alliance Networks and Regional Strategies of MNEs: A Structural Embeddedness Perspective”, Journal of International Business Studies, 49(8), 2018, 1033–1059.
- Benito, Gabriel R.G., Rygh, Asmund and Lunnan, Randi, "The Benefits of Internationalization for State Owned Enterprises", Global Strategy Journal, 6(4), 2016, 269–288.
- Benito, Gabriel R.G., Lunnan, Randi and Tomassen, Sverre, "Distant Encounters of the Third Kind: Multinational Companies Locating Divisional Headquarters Abroad", Journal of Management Studies, 48(2), 2011, 373–394.
- Benito, Gabriel R.G., Petersen, Bent and Welch, Lawrence S., "Towards more Realistic Conceptualisations of Foreign Operation Modes", Journal of International Business Studies, 40(9), 2009, 1455–1470.
- Goldeng, Eskil, Grünfeld, Leo A. and Benito, Gabriel R.G., "The Performance Differential between Private and State Owned Enterprises: The Roles of Ownership, Management, and Market Structure", Journal of Management Studies, 45(7), 2008, 1244–1273.
- Benito, Gabriel R.G., "Divestment and International Business Strategy", Journal of Economic Geography, 5(2), 2005, 235–251.
- Benito, Gabriel R.G., Pedersen, Torben and Petersen, Bent, "Export Channel Dynamics: An Empirical Examination", Managerial and Decision Economics, 26(3), 2005, 159–173.
- Benito, Gabriel R.G., Grøgaard, Birgitte and Narula, Rajneesh, "Environmental Influences on MNE Subsidiary Roles: Economic Integration and the Nordic Countries", Journal of International Business Studies, 34(5), 2003, 443–456.
- Benito, Gabriel R.G., "Divestment of Foreign Production Operations", Applied Economics, 29(10), 1997, 1365–1377.
- Benito, Gabriel R.G., and Welch, Lawrence S., "De-internationalization", Management International Review, 37(SI 2), 1997: 7-25.
- Benito, Gabriel R.G. and Gripsrud, Geir, "The Expansion of Foreign Direct Investments: Discrete Rational Location Choices or a Cultural Learning Process?", Journal of International Business Studies, 23(3), 1992, 461–476.
