= Stanislava Repar =

Slovak poet

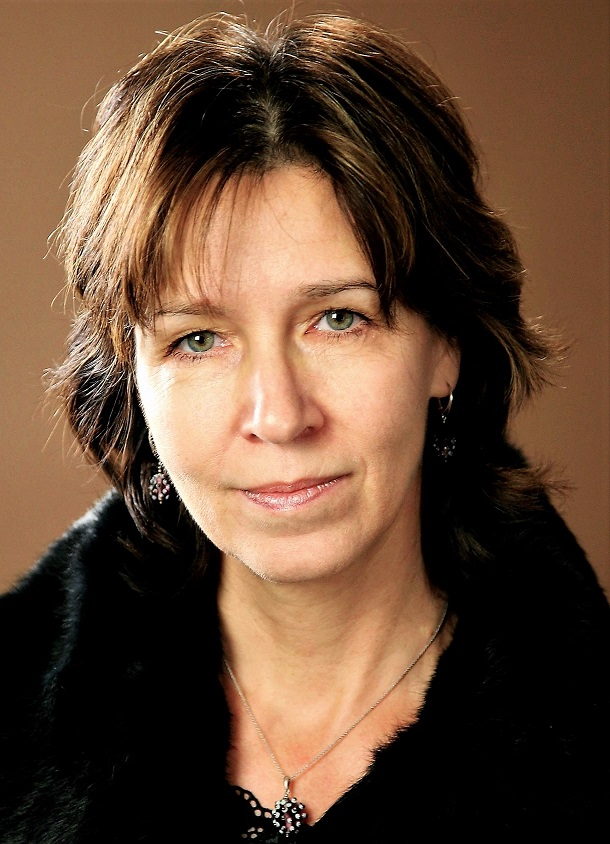
- Born: 5 May 1960 (age 66); Bratislava, Czechoslovakia
- Education: Comenius University
- Occupations: Poet, literary scientist, translator
- Writing career
- Language: Slovak, Slovenian

Stanislava Chrobáková Repar (née Kvapilová, born 5 May 1960) is a Slovak poet, literary scientist and translator.

== Biography ==
Repar was born on 5 May 1960 in Bratislava. She studied philosophy at the Comenius University and received a doctorate in literary science from the Slovak Academy of Sciences in 1995. She worked as a professor and researcher at the Comenius University and the Slovak Academy of Sciences.

In 2001 she married the Slovene poet Primož Repar and moved to Ljubljana. In Ljubljana, Repar worked intensively with the publishing house KUD Apokalipsa for more than two decades and was a leading specialist on gender in its eponymous magazine. At the same time, she contributed to the Slovak literary magazine Romboid. Between 2016 and 2017, she served as the editor of Romboid. Since 2018 she has edited the literary magazine Fraktál.

Repar writes poetry, essay and cultural critique in Slovak and Slovenian. She has published over 30 books, which were translated to sixteen languages.

== Personal life ==
From 1982 to 1991 she was married to the architect Ondrej Chrobák. She has a son from this marriage. From 2001 to 2015 her husband was the poet Primož Repar. The couple lived in Ljubljana. Following the breakup of her marriage, she moved to Finland, where she lived until 2021.

Repar identifies as a feminist. She holds a dual Slovak and Slovenian citizenship.
