= Pencho =

Pencho (Bulgarian: Пенчо) is a masculine given name. Bearers include:

- Pencho Georgiev (1900–1940), Bulgarian painter, scenographer and illustrator
- Pencho Slaveykov (1866–1912), Bulgarian poet
- Pencho Vichev (born 1952), Bulgarian Olympic sports shooter
- Pencho Zlatev (1881–1948), Bulgarian general and politician
- Pencho, a character in the 1920 Broadway play Spanish Love
