= Anna Ludmila =

American ballet and ballroom dancer (1903–1990)

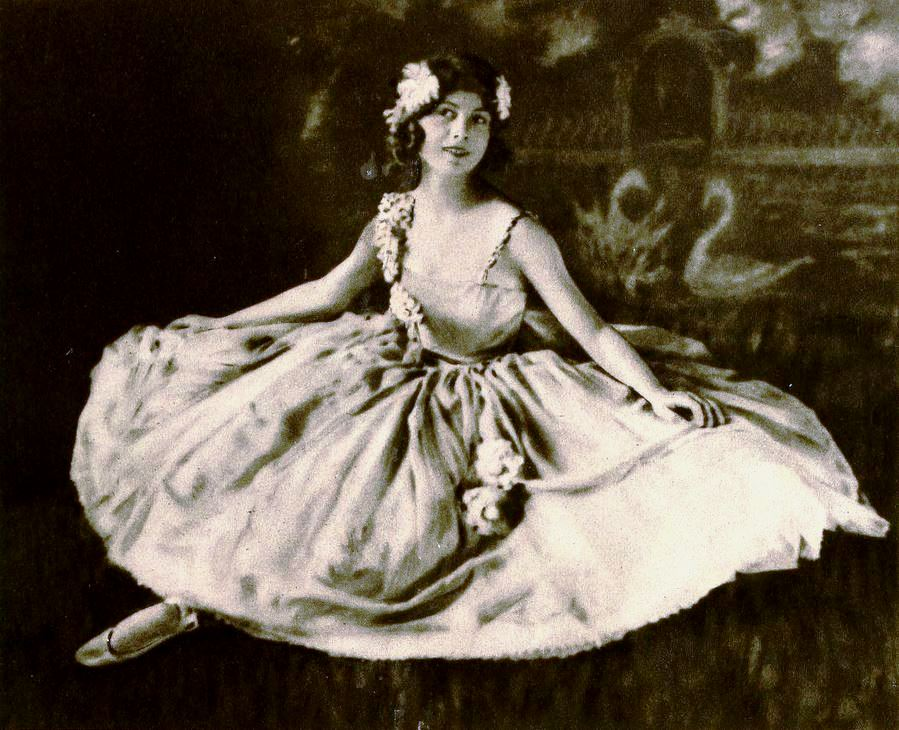
- Ludmila in 1922
- Born: Jean Marie Kaley; January 12, 1903; Chicago, Illinois, U.S.
- Died: April 18, 1990 (aged 87); Houston, Texas, U.S.
- Occupations: Ballet dancer; Ballroom dancer; Dance teacher
- Spouses: Jack "Jac" Broderick (1933–divorced); Howard Gee (1940s–1990)
- Children: Jan Broderick

Anna Ludmila (January 12, 1903 – April 18, 1990), born Jean Marie Kaley and also known as Anna Ludmilla and Ana Ludmilla, was an American ballet dancer based in Chicago, New York City, and France. She toured widely before injuring her leg in 1930 and afterward focused on ballroom dancing and teaching. During her career, she performed for the Chicago Opera Ballet in the Chicago Opera Association, later known as Chicago Civic Opera Company, on Broadway in New York City, and in film. As a teacher she moved with her husband to Panama where she headed the ballet division of a new National School of Dance.

== Early life and training ==
Ludmila was born in the Englewood suburb of Chicago and at age five began studying dance with Mabel Wentworth. Jean, as she was then known, had two ballerina idols, Adeline Genée and Anna Pavlova, but it was Pavlova who inspired her the most. During her eighth grade year of public school, in 1915, Jean got a chance not only to see Pavlova and her Imperial Russian Ballet perform, but to meet her idol. The company performed at night, while during the day Pavlova was starring in a movie being filmed near Midway Gardens theatre, and Mabel Wentworth was granted permission to introduce a few of her students to the internationally renowned ballerina. It was an experience Jean would never forget. From then on the aspiring ballerina began collecting photographs of Pavlova.

When she heard about a new dance school in Chicago, founded by two of Pavlova's former male danseurs, Jean left Mabel Wentworth's school to begin taking lessons from Serge Oukrainsky and Andreas Pavley. She auditioned for their newly organized company. By 1916, at age thirteen, Jean was the principal ballerina in America's first internationally touring ballet company, the Oukrainsky-Pavley Ballet.

Against her father's wishes, she Russianized her name to Anna Ludmila (often spelled Anna Ludmila and, occasionally, Ana Ludmilla). The company toured the U.S., performing in urban cities in states such as Nebraska, Missouri, Wisconsin and Massachusetts. Ludmila dropped out of high school to pursue her career as a professional dancer; a career choice her mother supported but her father and grandmother opposed. Her unconventional career path as a ballerina in the early 1900s, and her Russianized name, would cause an estrangement with her father.

== Professional debut and opera career ==
In 1917, she had her New York City debut at Carnegie Hall with the New York Symphony where she met Walter Damrosch. Theatre Magazine would name Ludmila the American Pavlova.

When Pavley and Oukrainsky were hired by Maestro Cleofonte Campanini as principal soloists in Chicago Opera Association productions, this led to some of their ballet company members being hired to dance in operatic ballet numbers, also, including Ludmila. Thus, in addition to performing in the Oukrainsky-Pavley Ballet, she performed with the Chicago Opera Ballet in the Chicago Opera Association, later known as Chicago Civic Opera Company. The Chicago Opera Ballet had three functions: to provide well-trained dancers for the opera productions; to entertain the audience between acts; and, because opera productions, and theaters housing opera companies, were expensive to operate, to bring in additional revenue by offering a few dance-only performances each year.

Ludmila was introduced to the Scottish opera soprano and movie actress, Mary Garden, who became a mentor. Garden was a single and financially independent career woman, and she advised the young ballerina on important matters: from negotiating contracts; to what to wear to formal galas; to how to respond to the numerous marriage proposals she received from male admirers.

== Broadway career ==
In 1920, Ludmila moved to New York City and danced in the Broadway musical Tip Top, starring the multi-talented Fred Stone. Opening night was at the Globe Theatre on October 5, 1920. Tip Top had mediocre success, and it closed in May 1921 after 246 performances. Almost immediately she was hired to dance in the Broadway musical Tangerine with partner Frank Holbrook. Ludmila played the part of Arameda and danced in at least two numbers with Holbrook, including "The Sea of the Tropics" and "Dance Tangerine." In all, there were 361 performances between the August 9, 1921 opening and the final night on August 26, 1922.

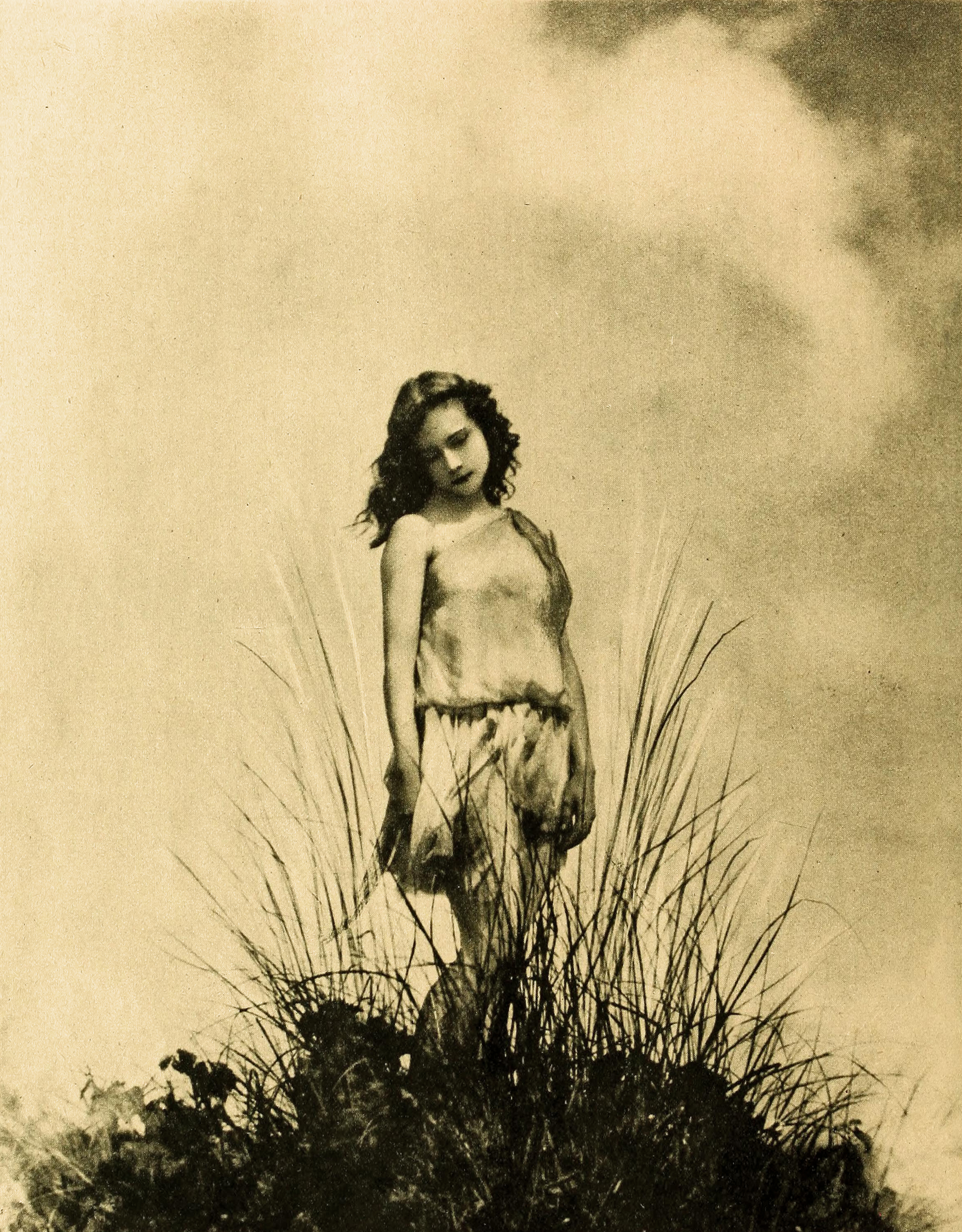
Ludmila photographed by James Wallace Pondelicek for Shadowland magazine, October 1922

When Russian immigrant Adolph Bolm was hired as ballet master of the Chicago Civic Opera, he asked Ludmila to return to Chicago as the première danseuse of Chicago Opera Ballet. She was nineteen years old.

== European career ==
Three years later Ludmila left Chicago and operatic ballet. She moved to Europe to further her training and career. She took classes with master teachers, including Lubov Egorova, Nicolai Legat and Margaret Craske. She danced ballet numbers in the Folies Bergère in Paris with Josephine Baker. She toured on the European ballroom circuit, dancing at famous resorts with partners trained in dance, and some who were not, such as the Frenchman and ex-boxer Georges Carpentier

In 1928, Ludmila was hired by Vaslav Nijinsky's sister, Bronislava Nijinska, as a soloist with a company founded by Ida Rubinstein, Les Ballets de Madame Rubinstein. The company, based in France, toured Europe, and at one of the performances the impresario Serge Diaghilev was in the audience. After a couple of meetings, he offered Ludmila a contract to join Ballets Russes as a soloist, but Nijinska refused to release her from the contract.

Another person to watch her perform was Anton Dolin. Once her contract with Rubinstein concluded, Ludmila moved from France to England to dance as Dolin's partner. George Balanchine created a pas de deux for them. For a brief time Dolin and Ludmila were engaged to marry. Frederick Ashton picked her for the leading female role in Pomona, a piece he premiered in the inaugural production that launched the Camargo Society. She was in the film, The Night Porter. American painter Charles Sneed Williams painted her portrait for an exhibit in London.

Ludmila was dancing in a London revue when she caught the toe of her pointe shoe on a nail, snapping her Achilles tendon. Unable to recover the strength in her right leg required for classical ballet, and not wanting to become infamous as a one-legged ballerina, she changed the focus of her professional career to ballroom dancing. She partnered with the noted European ballroom dancer Georges Fontana and together they sailed to the United States to dance in a club in New York City. The partnership lasted no more than a few months, and Ludmila moved to Indianapolis, Indiana. Her career as a professional dancer had ended. She was thirty years old.

== Teaching career in Panama ==
In 1947, Cecilia Pinel de Remón, the wife of Panamanian president General José Antonio Remón (also known as José Antonio Remón Cantera) founded the National School of Dance, or Escuela Nacional de Danzas. Eventually, a national ballet company was established. Ludmila headed the ballet division.

Margot Fonteyn, who had married the Panamanian diplomat, Roberto Arias, sought a coach in Panama City and she chose Ludmila. The two became close friends. Because of her friendship with Dame Fonteyn, Ludmila was authorized to teach the Royal Academy of Dance (RAD) syllabus. She interspersed her lessons with the Enrico Cecchetti method. Cecchetti had been one of Pavlova's teachers.

== Personal life ==
On January 12, 1933, her birthday, she married a long time acquaintance, Jack "Jac" Broderick, who had studied with Oukrainsky and Pavley. The couple opened a dance studio in Indianapolis; also, Ludmila taught with the Chicago Association of Dancing Masters. She and Jack had a son named Jan. The marriage ended.

Toward the end of World War II she married Howard Gee, and when his job with an airline company took him to Peru, Ludmila, Jan, and her mother, Isabel, moved with him. A year later the family moved to Panama and lived in the Canal Zone. They stayed for twenty-two years.

== Later years and legacy ==
When Howard retired from his civil service position the couple moved to the United States, first living in Harlingen, Texas, then in Eugene, Oregon. At age sixty-eight, the Panama government awarded Ludmila, also known as Mrs. Jean Gee, the Order of Vasco Núñez de Balboa at a ceremony on November 15, 1971. It is the highest Panamanian award bestowed on a citizen. Ludmila was honored for her role in establishing Panama's national ballet company.

By 1972, Jean and Howard had moved to College Station, Texas, where she resumed her teaching career at a private studio. She regularly flew to New York City, or to U.S. cities such as Houston, Texas, to visit Fonteyn. Ludmila donated her collection chronicling her dance career to the Bryan Public Library, the main library in the Bryan-College Station, Texas area. The collection included her scrapbooks of newspaper clippings; letters from close friends, such as Dolin and Ashton; playbills and programmes; and some memorabilia, including her award from the Panama government and a pair of Margot's pointe shoes. The collection was donated in memory of son Jan, who had died in 1955. He had been killed by a hitchhiker, his body dumped in a ditch near Houston, Texas.

Ludmila was still teaching at the age of eighty-seven when she died of cancer at a hospital in Houston, Texas. On April 23, 1990, Dame Margot Fonteyn attended the memorial service at St. Thomas Episcopal Church, College Station, Texas. She remained after the service concluded, taking time to speak with Ludmila's students, many of whom were the same age as Jean when she met Pavlova.

== Sources ==
- Amberg, George (1949). Ballet in America: The Emergence of an American Art. New York: Duell, Sloan and Pearce.
- "American Dancer". American Dancer. 11 (5): 35. March 1938.
- Anderson, Jack (April 1, 1984). "Dance View; Chicago Was Once America's Ballet Capital". The New York Times.
- Balanchine, George (1983). Choreography by George Balanchine: A Catalogue of Works. New York: The Eakins Press Foundation.
- Barzel, Ann. The Newberry Library. Ann Barzel Rare Book Collections: 60 West Walton Street, Chicago, Illinois.
- Barzel, Ann (June 1979). "Chicago's "Two Russians": Andreas Pavley and Serge Oukrainsky". Dance Magazine: 63–70, 87–93.
- Barzel, Ann (June 2002). "The First 75 Years: Dance Magazine, 75th Anniversary Issue". Dance Magazine: 31–35.
- "Chicago National Association of Dance Masters". Archived from the original on March 29, 2012.
- Chicago Public Library.
- Clarke, Mary; Vaughan, David (1977). The Encyclopedia of Dance & Ballet. New York: G.P. Putnam's Sons.
- Corey, Arthur (1977). Danse Macabre: The Life and Death of Andreas Pavley. Richardson: The Havilah Press.
- Crain, Cynthia D. Interviews with Jean Marie Gee (Anna Ludmilla), 1973–1990.
- Crain, Cynthia. Eulogy. Presented at Jean Kaley Gee's memorial service on April 23, 1990, St. Thomas Episcopal Church, College Station, Texas.
- "A Dancer in Opera: Society and Entertainments, in the Limelight". Chicago Sunday Tribune. January 19, 1919. p. 4.
- "Dancing Her Tonic: Nerves Jangle? Dance on Toes, Ludmila Says Opera Danseuse Talks of Slim Ankles". Chicago Daily Tribune. September 17, 1922. p. 9. ProQuest 175076384.
- Dolin, Anton (1982). Dolin: Friends and Memories. London: Routledge & Kegan Paul.
- Dolin, Anton. Dolin Scrapbooks Collection. National Art Library Victoria & Albert Museum. Blythe House, Theatre & Performance Collections. Reference Number: THM/11.
- E. E. (1931). "The Camargo Society". The Musical Times. 72 (1062): 745. JSTOR 916193.
- Encyclopedia of Chicago.
- "Fred Stone in "Tip-Top"". The Christian Science Monitor. September 28, 1920. p. 12. ProQuest 510364594.
- Gee Collection. Carnegie Center of Brazos Valley History, Rare Book Collections: 111 S. Main Street, Bryan, Texas. Search Anna Ludmila or Serge Oukrainsky or Andreas Pavley.
- Global Performing Arts Database.
- Haselbarth, Patty (1999). Anna Ludmila: The Forgotten Ballerina. Ann Arbor: UMI Dissertation Services.
- "INAC, Escuela Nacional de Danzas".
- International Encyclopedia of Dance. Vol. 5. New York: Oxford University Press. 1998.
- "Tangerine". Internet Broadway Database.
- "Tip Top". Internet Broadway Database.
- "Jean Marie Gee, 87, Dancer and Teacher". The New York Times (Obituary). May 2, 1990.
- Kane, Angela; Pritchard, Jane (1994). "The Camargo Society Part I". Dance Research. 12 (2): 21–65. doi:10.2307/1290989. JSTOR 1290989.
- Kavanagh, Julie (1996). Secret Muses: The Life of Frederick Ashton. New York: Pantheon Books.
- Litzenberger, Lesley (October 1990). "Anna, Ludmila". Dance Magazine: 32–33.
- Mann, Teresa (1996). "Panama: Music Theatre, Dance Theatre". In Rubin, Don; Solorzano, Carlos (eds.). The World Encyclopedia of Contemporary Theatre. Vol. 2. London: Routledge. pp. 352–353. ISBN 978-0-415-22745-2.
- Moore, Nancy G. (2005). "Dance". Electronic Encyclopedia of Chicago. Chicago Historical Society, The Newberry Library. p. 359.
- Moore, Nancy G. (2005). "Dance Training". Electronic Encyclopedia of Chicago. Chicago Historical Society, The Newberry Library.
- "Newberry Library".
- New York Public Library for the Performing Arts.
- Richardson, Philip J.S. (December 1929). "Round the World: News of Dancers from Abroad". The Dance Magazine. 13 (2): 38.
- Richardson, Philip J.S. (March 1930). "Round the World: News of Dancers from Abroad". The Dance Magazine. 13 (5): 31.
- Richardson, Philip J.S. (July 1930). "Round the World: News of Dancers from Abroad". The Dance Magazine. 14 (3): 39.
- Schillo, Marion (February 1935). "Ballerina's Career: A Biographical Sketch of Anna Ludmilla". The American Dancer: 9, 28.
- Severn, Margaret (1988). "Dancing with Bronislava Nijinska and Ida Rubinstein". Dance Chronicle. 11 (3): 333–364. doi:10.1080/01472528708568985. JSTOR 1567661.
- "Stage Door". Dance Magazine. 9 (4): 47. February 1928.
- "[Article title not provided]". Theatre Magazine. 2 (14): 1. December 10, 1886.
- "[Article title not provided]". Theatre Magazine. 26 (198): 71. August 1917.
- "[Article title not provided]". Theatre Magazine. 35 (12): 373. December 1919.
- "[Article title not provided]". Theatre Magazine. 35 (5): 278, 311. May 1922.
- Vaughan, David (1999). Frederick Ashton and His Ballets. London: Dance Books.
- Walker, Kathrine Sorley (1995). "The Camargo Society". Dance Chronicle. 18 (1): 1–114. doi:10.1080/01472529508569181. JSTOR 1567830.
