= Kierkegaard Circle =

Philosophical society at Trinity College, Toronto

The Kierkegaard Circle at Trinity College, University of Toronto is a philosophical society whose purpose is to promote the study of the philosophy and theology of Søren Kierkegaard in Canada. It was founded in 1986 by Abrahim Khan after an International Kierkegaard Conference held at Trinity College.
