= Ivanka =

Ivanka may refer to:

== People ==
- Ivanka (given name), including a list of people with the name

== Places ==
- 8573 Ivanka (1996 VQ), a Main-belt Asteroid discovered in 1996
- Ivanka pri Dunaji (Hungarian: Pozsonyivánka), a village and municipality in western Slovakia
- Ivanka pri Nitre, a village and municipality in the Nitra District in western central Slovakia

== Other uses ==
- Ivanka (horse) (born 1990), Thoroughbred racehorse
- "Ivanka", a song by Imperial Teen on the album On

== See also ==
- Ivanković, surname
- Jovanka (disambiguation)
