= Ognjen =

Ognjen (Serbian Cyrillic: Огњен, pronounced [ognjen]) is a given name common in the countries of the former Yugoslavia. It is derived from the word oganj, meaning "fire", and may refer to:

- Ognjen Amidžić (born 1975), Serbian TV host
- Ognjen Aškrabić (born 1979), Serbian basketball player
- Ognjen Bakić (born 2003), Montenegrin footballer
- Ognjen Čančarević (born 1989), Armenian-Serbian footballer
- Ognjen Čarapić (born 1998), Montenegrin basketball player
- Ognjen Cvitan (born 1961), Croatian (formerly Yugoslavian) chess grandmaster
- Ognjen Damnjanović (born 1985), Serbian footballer
- Ognjen Đelmić (born 1988), Bosnian footballer
- Ognjen Đerić (born 1994), French handball player
- Ognjen Dobrić (born 1994), Serbian basketball player
- Ognjen Đuričin (born 1995), Serbian footballer
- Ognjen Filipović (born 1973), Serbian canoeist
- Ognjen Gajić (born 1963), American-Bosnian physician and musician
- Ognjen Gašević (born 2002), Montenegrin footballer
- Ognjen Gnjatić (born 1991), Bosnian footballer
- Ognjen Ilić (born 1998), Serbian cyclist
- Ognjen Jaramaz (born 1993), Serbian basketball player
- Ognjen Jovanić (born 1978), Croatian chess player
- Ognjen Koroman (born 1978), Serbian footballer
- Ognjen Krasić (born 1988), Serbian footballer
- Ognjen Kraus (born 1945), Croatian physician
- Ognjen Kržić (born 1969), Croatian water polo player
- Ognjen Kuzmanović (1895–1967), Serbian politician
- Ognjen Kuzmić (born 1990), Serbian basketball player
- Ognjen Lakić (born 1978), Serbian footballer
- Ognjen Lekić (born 1982), Serbian footballer
- Ognjen Lukić (born 2003), Serbian footballer
- Ognjen Mihajlović (born 1960), Serbian politician
- Ognjen Mijailović (born 2003), Serbian footballer
- Ognjen Milić (born 2007), Serbian tennis player
- Ognjen Milić (born 2005), Serbian basketball player
- Ognjen Mimović (born 2004), Serbian footballer
- Ognjen Mitrović (born 1999), Serbian footballer
- Ognjen Mudrinski (born 1991), Serbian footballer
- Ognjen Ožegović (born 1994), Serbian footballer
- Ognjen Pantović (born 1989), Serbian politician
- Ognjen Petrović (1948–2000), Serbian footballer
- Ognjen Petrović (footballer, born 1993), Bosnian footballer
- Ognjen Prica (1899–1941), Yugoslav politician
- Ognjen Radošević (born 2003), Serbian footballer
- Ognjen Rolović (born 1993), Montenegrin footballer
- Ognjen Škorić (born 1993), Bosnian footballer
- Ognjen Sokolović (born 1963), Bosnian bobsledder
- Ognjen Spahić (born 1977), Montenegrin writer
- Ognjen Stijepović (born 1999), Montenegrin footballer
- Ognjen Stjepanović (born 1998), Bosnian footballer
- Ognjen Stojaković (born 1981), Serbian basketball coach
- Ognjen Stojanović (born 1990), Serbian triathlete
- Alberto Ognjen Štriga (1821–1897), Croatian reformer, composer, and musician
- Ognjen Sviličić (born 1971), Croatian screenwriter and film director
- Ognjen Tadić (born 1974), Serbian politician
- Ognjen Teofilović (born 2006), Serbian footballer
- Ognjen Todorović (born 1989), Bosnian footballer
- Ognjen Topić (born 1986), American Muay Thai champion
- Ognjen Ugrešić (born 2006), Serbian footballer
- Ognjen Valjić (born 1981), Bosnian football referee
- Ognjen Vranješ (born 1989), Bosnian footballer
- Ognjen Vukojević (born 1983), Croatian football manager and former player
- Ognjen Zaric (born 1989), Serbian football manager

== See also ==
- Ognjenović
- Slavic names
