= Ognjanović =

Ognjanović (Serbian: Огњановић) is a Serbian surname. Notable people with the surname include:

- Dejan Ognjanović (born 1978), Montenegrin footballer
- Dejan Ognjanović (author) (born 1973), Serbian author
- Dragoslav Ognjanović (1961–2018), Serbian lawyer
- Konstantin Ognjanović (born 1973), Serbian footballer
- Ljubomir Ognjanović (1933–2008), Serbian footballer
- Marko Ognjanović, a leader in Tican's Rebellion
- Olivera Ognjanović (born 1969), Serbian politician
- Radivoje Ognjanović (born 1933), Serbian football manager and former footballer
- Srđan Ognjanović, Serbian mathematician
