= Kjell Grønhaug =

Norwegian organizational theorist

Kjell Grønhaug (born 1935) is a Norwegian organizational theorist, management consultant and Professor emeritus of Business Administration at the Norwegian School of Economics and Business Administration.

== Biography ==
Grønhaug obtained his MS in sociology from the University of Bergen, his MBA and his PhD in marketing from the Norwegian School of Economics. Early 1970s he obtained a postgraduate degree from the University Graduate School of Business Administration at the University of Washington.

Back in Norway Grønhaug was appointed Professor of Business Studies at the Norwegian School of Economics and Business Administration. Over the years he has been visiting professor in Europe at the Copenhagen Business School, the University of Kiel, the University of Innsbruck and the Aalto University School of Business; and in the States at the University of Pittsburgh, the University of Illinois at Urbana–Champaign, and the University of California. Grønhaug has been cooperating with the Industrial Marketing and Purchasing Group (IMP Group) since the 1990s.

Grønhaug received an honorary doctorate from the Turku School of Economics and from the University of Gothenburg in 2010.

== Selected publications ==
Grønhaug authored and co-authored about 18 books and numerous articles. Books, a selection:

- Pervez N. Ghauri, Kjell Grønhaug (2005) Research Methods In Business Studies: A Practical Guide

Articles, a selection:

- Gripsrud, Geir, and Kjell Grønhaug. "Structure and strategy in grocery retailing: A sociometric approach." The Journal of Industrial Economics 33.3 (1985): 339-347.
- Grønhaug, Kjell, and Mary C. Gilly. "A transaction cost approach to consumer dissatisfaction and complaint actions∗." Journal of economic psychology 12.1 (1991): 165-183.
- Stone, Robert N., and Kjell Grønhaug. "Perceived risk: further considerations for the marketing discipline." European Journal of marketing 27.3 (1993): 39-50.
- Magne, Supphellen, and Grønhaug Kjell. "Building foreign brand personalities in Russia: the moderating effect of consumer ethnocentrism." International Journal of Advertising 22.2 (2003): 202-226.
- Dreyer, Bent, and Kjell Grønhaug. "Uncertainty, flexibility, and sustained competitive advantage." Journal of business research 57.5 (2004): 484-494.
- Vaaland, Terje I., Morten Heide, and Kjell Grønhaug. "Corporate social responsibility: investigating theory and research in the marketing context." European Journal of Marketing 42.9/10 (2008): 927-953.
