= Nikolay Krastev =

Nikolay Krastev may refer to:

- Nikolay Krastev (footballer, born 1979), Bulgarian football defender
- Nikolay Krastev (footballer, born 1996), Bulgarian football goalkeeper
