= Stanislava Nopová =

Czech author, poet and publisher (born 1953)

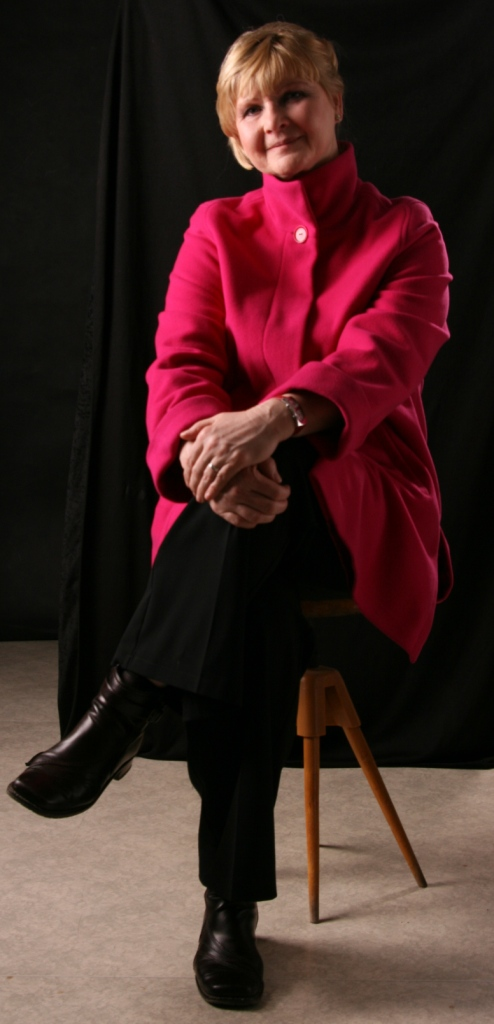
Nopová in 2010

Stanislava Nopova (born 26 May 1953) is a Czech author, poet and publisher.

== Biography ==
Stanislava Nopová was born on 26 May 1953 in Gottwaldow, Czechoslovakia (now Zlín, Czech Republic). After graduating from secondary school in Zlín and then Nursing High School in Brno, she worked as a Physiotherapy specialist in Prostějov, Luhačovice and Hradec Králové. After a period of prolonged illness she left her work in the health services in the spring of 1989. She then started working as a florist, and later as a financial consultant and manager in an insurance company. During this time she studied literature and creative writing. Over the course of the next several years she wrote poems, fairy tales and story books. In 1999 she went to study in Australia, where she remained until 2001. After returning to the Czech Republic she began to publish her work in newspapers and magazines. In 2006 she published the first edition of The Christmas Newspaper. In early 2007 she founded the Prague Press newspaper, a monthly business and lifestyle magazine which is currently still in publication. Stanislava Nopová has been publishing books since 2002 and has compiled a travel guide about the fifth continent with the apt title The Best of Australia. Her writing for children has so far resulted in the published book The World Beyond the Cliffs. She introduced herself as a poet with the book entitled The Gift. The focus of the author's work is directed at creating prose for adults: Daiquirita, X Terra Incognita, To Kill for a Job, Hazardous Holiday.

== Bibliography ==
- Daiquirita (2009), a contemporary, social novel for women. A mature woman addresses the crisis of her marriage and the loss of her well-paid job. She turns her life upside down in order to survive and live better. The story takes place on three continents (Prague, Chicago, Sydney).
- To Kill for a Job' (2009), dystopia, a dystopian novel in the period after the election success of the "Strong Seven", a party of charismatic politicians. Their success brings a renewed hope to solve the problems of crime and unemployment but the reality of the situation is different. Political tyranny and social crisis grow to enormous proportions. The novels hero, Johan the carpenter, is forced to become a lonely and desperate gladiator, willing to do anything to survive.
- X Terra Incognita (2009), thriller, detective story with a twist of sci-fi. The Australian desert aptly named Sandy Desert with an area larger than Europe is seemingly deserted and dead. Murders of foreigners reveal startling clues to the investigators that the Australian continent is being threatened by an unknown monster.
- Hazardous Holiday (2009), a thriller. Brno student Anastasia has no idea that her journey to America would surpass the potential hazards dreamt up in the imagination of her parents, who warned her not to go. Awaiting her is a fight for life and the almost futile attempt to return home.
- The Gift' (2009), poetry for youth and adults. Narrative verses which reflect our times.
- The World Beyond the Cliffs (2009) an adventure book for children. An eight-year-old Czech girl called Diana, a Japanese girl Rieko and an Australian boy Thomas experience a world of adventures on the shores of Sydney. The book is about a beautiful friendship that knows no borders or language barriers.
- 'The Best of Australia (2002). Both a travelogue and a guide. Stanislava Nopová introduces the Australian continent from the perspective of her own personal experiences and impressions, with many witty observations. This book provides a wealth of factual information about Australia.
