= Astrid Söderbergh Widding =

Swedish film studies scholar (born 1963)

Professor Astrid Söderbergh Widding
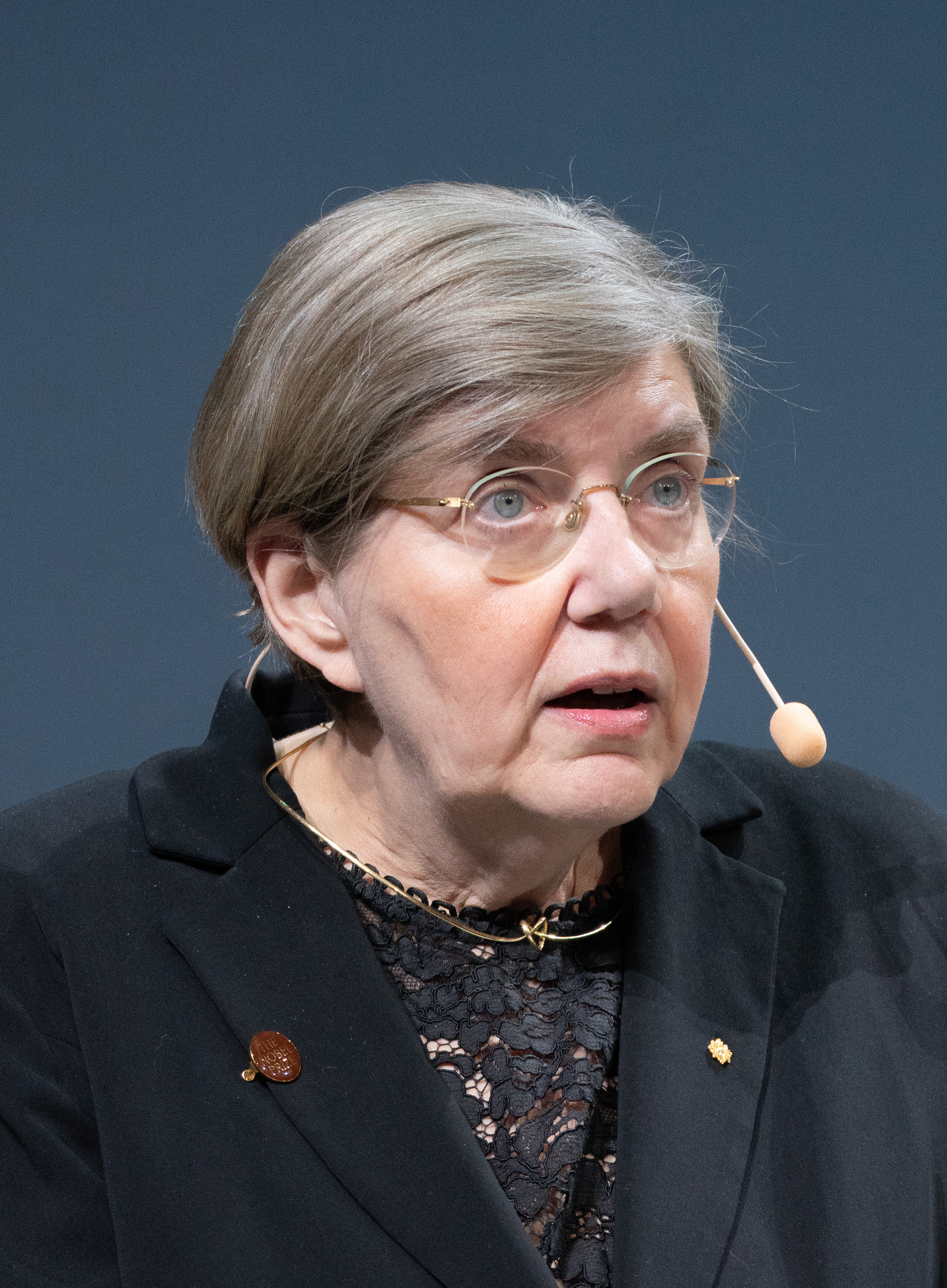
- Widding at 2024 Nobel Week
- Born: 27 May 1963 (age 63)

Astrid Naemi Söderbergh Widding (born 27 May 1963) is a Swedish film studies scholar. She is professor of cinema studies and was rector (i.e. vice-chancellor) of Stockholm University between 2013 and 2025. Söderbergh Widding is a former board member of the Swedish Film Institute, a former president of the board of the Ingmar Bergman Foundation, and a former columnist in the newspaper Svenska Dagbladet. She earned her PhD in 1992 at Stockholm University with a dissertation on Andrei Tarkovsky. She was elected as a member of the Royal Swedish Academy of Sciences in 2014 and became a Knight of the French Legion of Honour in 2015.

In 2023, she was appointed chair of the board of directors of the Nobel Foundation. Since 2025, she is Executive Director of the Marianne and Marcus Wallenberg Foundation and the Marcus and Amalia Wallenberg Foundation. In May 2025, she held a Resident Fellowship at the Swedish Collegium for Advanced Study in Uppsala, Sweden.
