= Jostein Gripsrud =

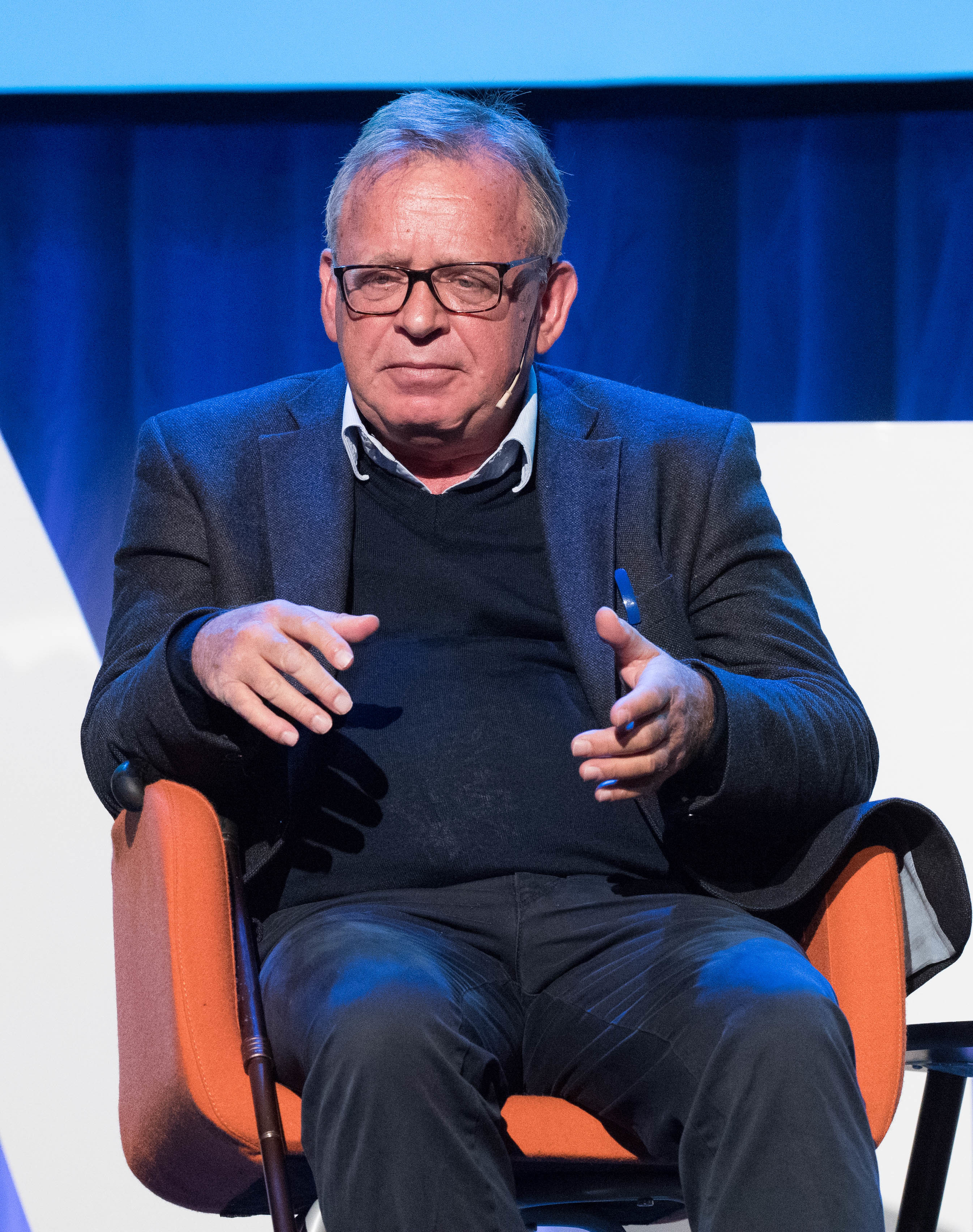
Jostein Gripsrud, 2018

Jostein Gripsrud (born 1952) is a Norwegian media scholar, and is Professor in Media Studies at the University of Bergen.

== Life and work ==
Gripsrud completed his MA exam at the University of Bergen, Norway, in 1979 and started as lecturer in Norwegian language and literature at Stockholm University in 1980. He obtained his PhD at the University of Bergen in 1988 on two different dissertations on major mass movements in Norway and their relations with the medium of theatre 1890-1940. He started as the first scholar from the humanities in the then new field of media studies in 1984, as Research Associate, and was hired as an Associate Professor of media studies in 1988. In 1991 he was appointed Professor in Media Studies at the University of Bergen

Gripsrud has lectured in a number of countries on different continents and has had several prolonged research stays internationally. He was a visiting researcher at USC and UCLA in 1987, again at UCLA in 1993, in Paris 2008-10 (working at the Norwegian Centre at the Fondation Maison des Sciences de l'Homme), in Brussels in 2011 (as winner of the International Franqui Chair award, working at the Vrije Universiteit Brussel, Université libre de Bruxelles and Universiteit Gent), and in Helsinki 2017-18 as recipient of the Helsingin Sanomat Fellowship at the Helsinki Collegium for Advanced Studies.

In addition, Gripsrud been involved in cultural policy work, among other things, he was a member of the Norwegian National Commission for UNESCO and Chairman of the Public Service Broadcasting Council. Gripsrud is also an active media commentator and has been a regular columnist in 'Dagens Næringsliv', a business daily, between 1998 and 2011.

Gripsrud has published numerous books and articles in several languages on theater, popular literature, film history, television, journalism, popular music, media and culture - as well as the relevant social and cultural theory for all these media, genres and cultural forms. He has led a number of national and international research projects, such as SCANPUB - The Immigration Issue in Scandinavian Public Spheres 1970 - 2015. He wrote the screenplay for and was host of the television series "Cultural Disorder" (six episodes) that took place in two Norwegian - channels in spring 2003. He initiated and was the first editor of the online magazine Vox Publica, a forum for "all who are interested in democracy and freedom of expression".

His brother, Geir Gripsrud, is Professor of International Marketing at BI in Oslo.

== Bibliography (selected) ==
- The Dynasty Years: Hollywood Television and Critical Media Studies (1995)
- Television and Common Knowledge (1999)
- Understanding Media Culture (2002)
- Media, Markets & Public Spheres: European Media at the Crossroads. Jostein Gripsrud, Lennart Weibull (2010)
