= Filozofia =

- Discipline: Philosophy
- Language: English, Slovak, Czech
- Edited by: Jon Stewart

Publication details
- Publisher: Institute of Philosophy, Slovak Academy of Sciences (Slovakia)
- Frequency: Monthly

Standard abbreviations
- ISO 4: Filozofia

Indexing
- ISSN: 0046-385X
- OCLC no.: 643882854

Links
- Journal homepage

Filozofia is an academic journal of philosophy published by the Slovak Academy of Sciences. It publishes articles in Slovak, Czech, and English. The journal's scope includes metaphysics, epistemology, history of philosophy, social philosophy, philosophy of mind, ethics, philosophy of religion, and related disciplines. The journal publishes 6 issues a year (February, April, May, September, October, December). The editor-in-chief is Jon Stewart.

Articles appearing in Filozofia are indexed in Current Contents®/Arts & Humanities; Web of Science Core Collection (Arts & Humanities Citation Index); SCOPUS; Dietrichs Index Philosophicus; International Bibliography of Periodical Literature on the Humanities and Social Sciences; IBZ – Online (www.gbv.de); IBR – International Bibliography of Book Reviews of Scholarly Literature on the Humanities and Social Sciences; IBR – Online (www.gbv.de); CEJSH (The Central European Journal of Social Sciences and Humanities); EBSCO; Philosopher’s Index; ERIH PLUS; Sherpa Romeo.

The texts published in the journal Filozofia are included in the Slovak National Corpus - a comprehensive database of linguistic data intended for lexicographic, grammatical and stylistic research of the Slovak language. The Slovak National Corpus is administered and scientifically processed by the Ľudovít Štúr Institute of Linguistics SAS, v.v.i.
