= Hauke Brunkhorst =

German sociologist

Hauke Brunkhorst (born 24 October 1945) is a German political sociologist, Professor of Sociology and Head of the Institute of Sociology at the University of Flensburg, Germany. He specializes in European constitutionalism, political theory and European affairs. He received his doctorate in 1977 from the University of Frankfurt with a thesis "Praxisbezug und Theoriebildung". During the 2009-2010 academic year, he was the Theodor Heuss Professor at the New School for Social Research in New York City.

== Publications ==
- Solidarity. From Civic Friendship to a Global Legal Community, Cambridge/London (MIT Press) 2005 (Transl. of Solidarität, Frankfurt: Suhrkamp 2002).
- Adorno and Critical Theory, Cardiff (University of Wales Press) 1999.
