= Krasimir Krastev (footballer) =

Bulgarian footballer

Personal information
- Full name: Krasimir Angelov Krastev
- Date of birth: 26 August 1984 (age 42)
- Place of birth: Plovdiv, Bulgaria
- Height: 1.80 m (5 ft 11 in)
- Position: Midfielder

Team information
- Current team: Botev Plovdiv

Youth career
- 1994–2003: Botev Plovdiv

Senior career*
Years	Team	Apps	(Gls)
2003–2009	Botev Plovdiv	80	(5)
2009–2010	Lyubimets 2007	5	(0)
2010–	Botev Plovdiv	3	(2)
- * Club domestic league appearances and goals as of 19 September 2010

Krasimir Krastev (Bulgarian: Красимир Кръстев; born 26 August 1984) is a left midfielder association football player from Bulgaria who is currently playing for Botev Plovdiv.

== Career ==
In 2003 the youth academy midfielder Krasimir Krastev agreed to the conditions of his first professional contract with the club, which would be effective for five years.
