= 1956 in Norway =

- Centuries: 18th; 19th; 20th; 21st
- Decades: 1930s; 1940s; 1950s; 1960s; 1970s
- See also: List of years in Norway

Events in the year 1956 in Norway.

== Incumbents ==
- Monarch – Haakon VII.
- Regent – Olav, due to debilitating injury to the King
- Prime Minister – Einar Gerhardsen (Labour Party)

== Events ==
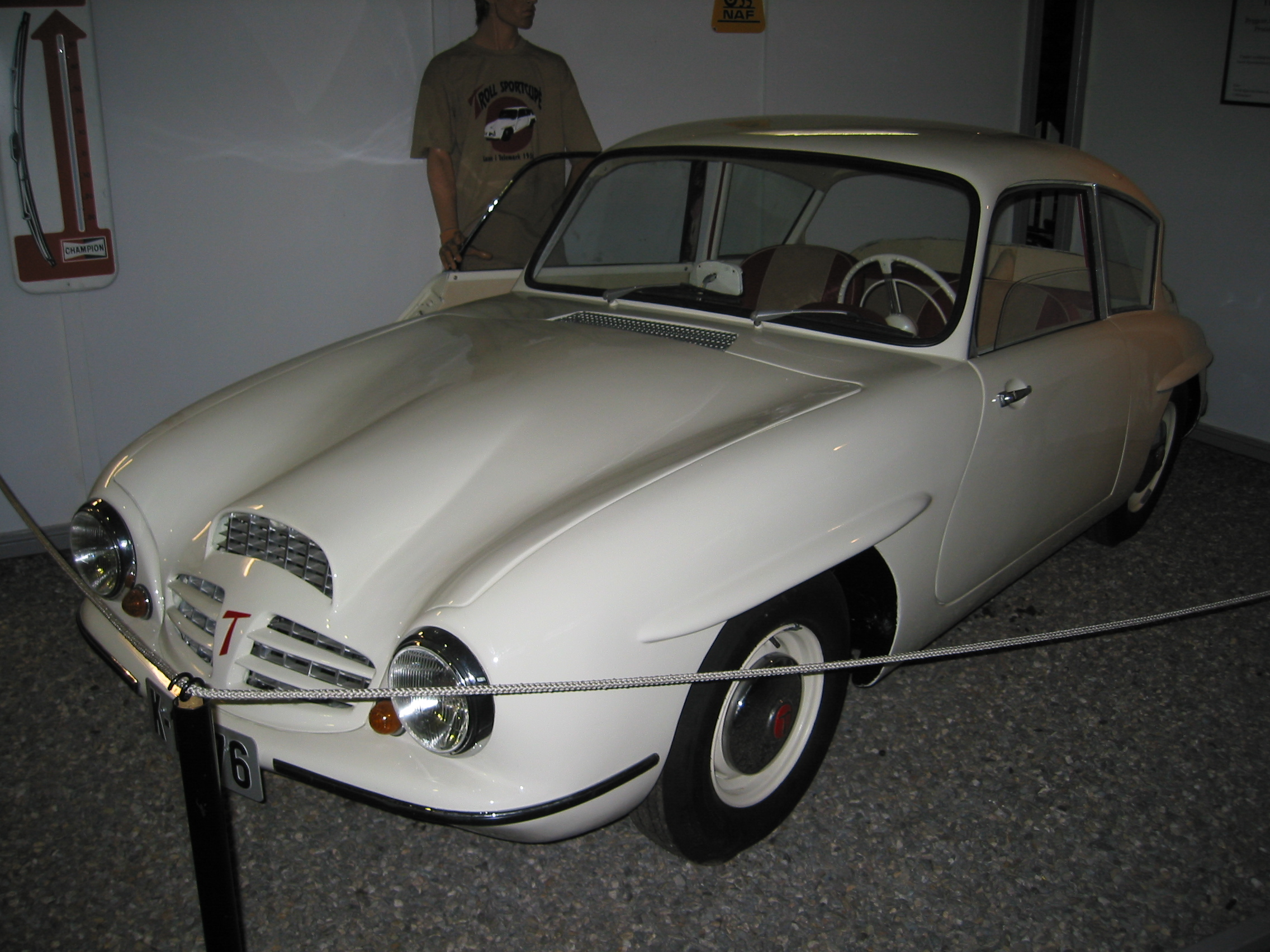
The Norwegian motor vehicle manufacturer Troll Plastik & Bilindustri presents the first Troll car in Telemark

- 7 March – Several avalanche kill 21 people and causing heavy damage in Nordland and Troms.
- 9 April – The Norwegian Humanist Association is founded.
- 10 October – A fire burns down the Dalsenget Depot of Trondheim Sporvei and destroys almost all of the modern tram fleet.
- 12 October – The Norwegian motor vehicle manufacturer Troll Plastik & Bilindustri presents the first Troll car in Telemark.
- 19 October – An explosion occurring underground in the factory in hall 15 of Raufoss Ammunisjonsfabrikker kills 5 people and hospitalises at least 21 people.
- 7 November – Braathens SAFE Flight 253 crashes into Hummelfjell mountain in Tolga Municipality, killing 2 people on board.
- 21 December – The Royal Norwegian Ministry of Children and Families is established.

== Popular culture ==
=== Sports ===
- Roald Aas, speed skater and Olympic gold medallist and cyclist, is awarded the Egebergs Ærespris for his achievements as both a speed skater and a cyclist.

=== Literature ===
- The Song of the Red Ruby (original title Sangen om den røde rubin), novel by Agnar Mykle

== Notable births ==
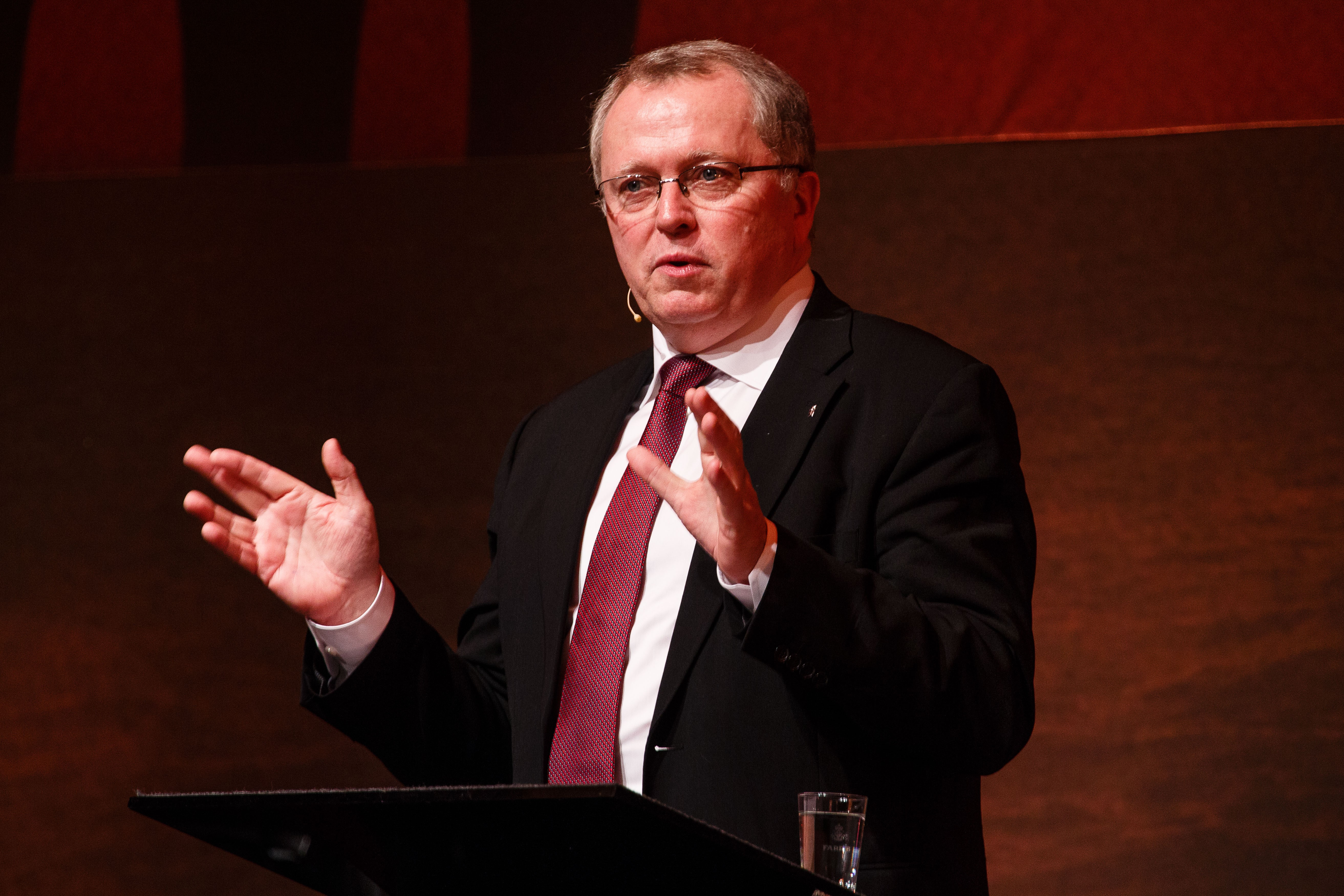
Eldar Sætre

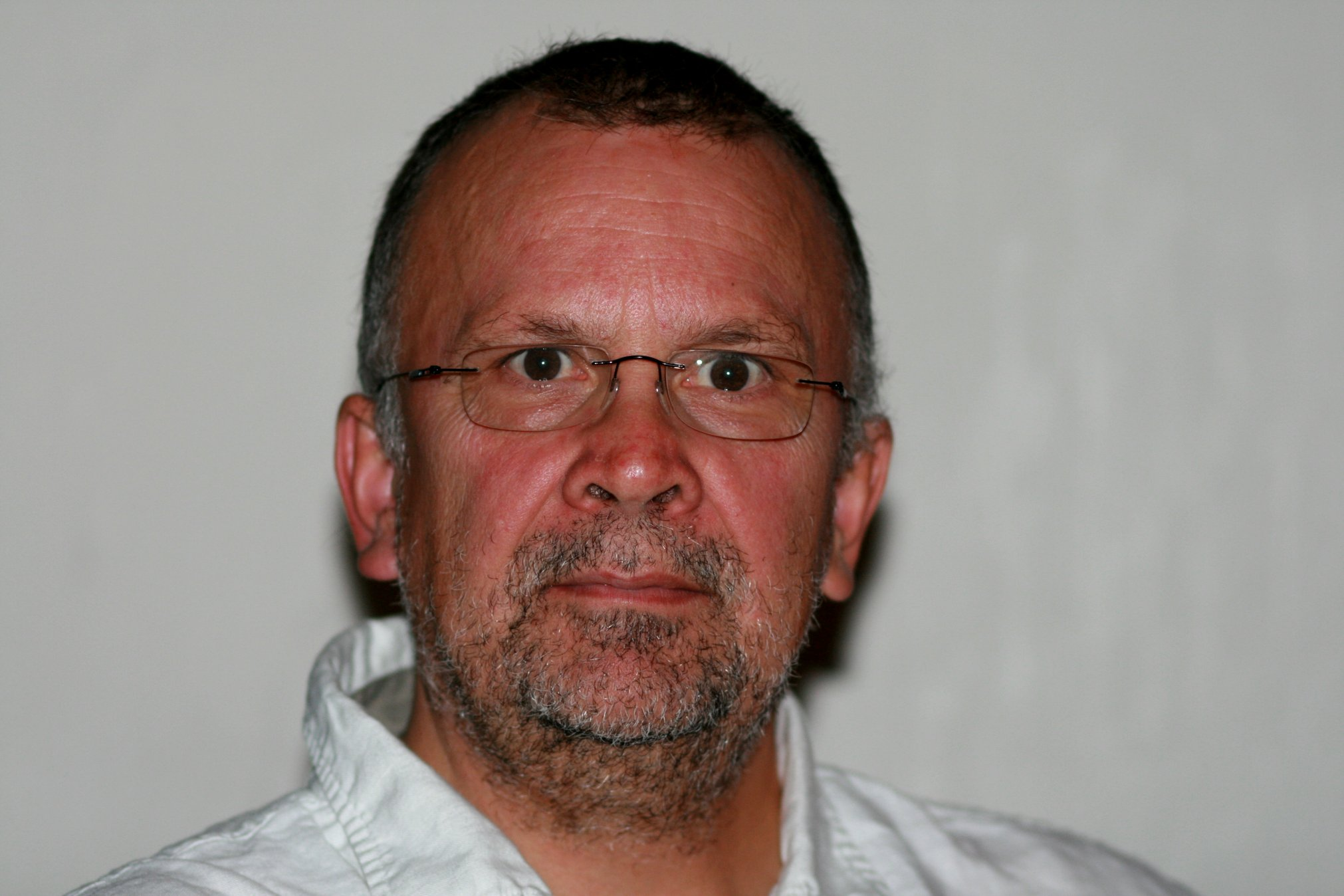
Rune Belsvik

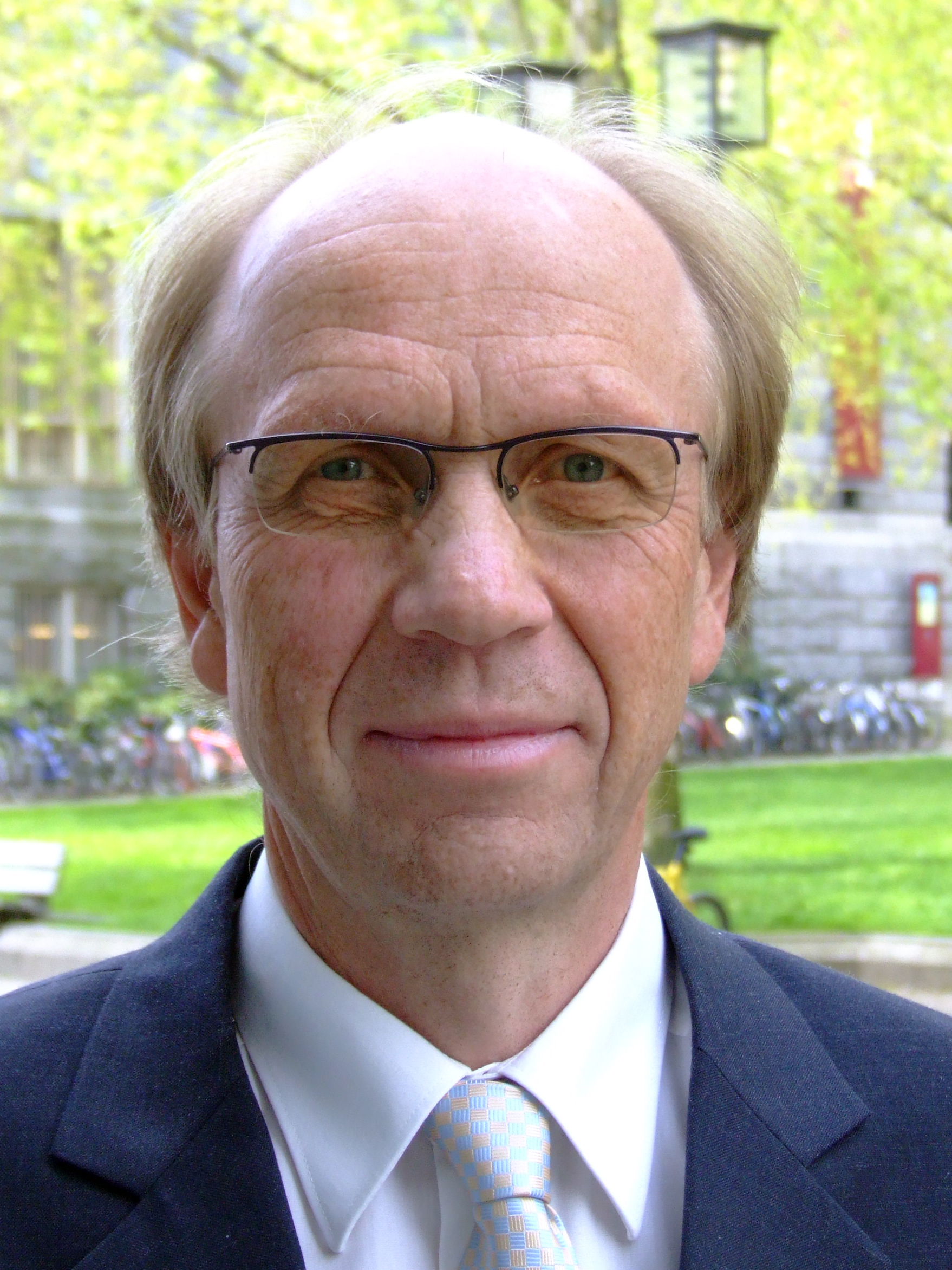
Knut N. Kjær

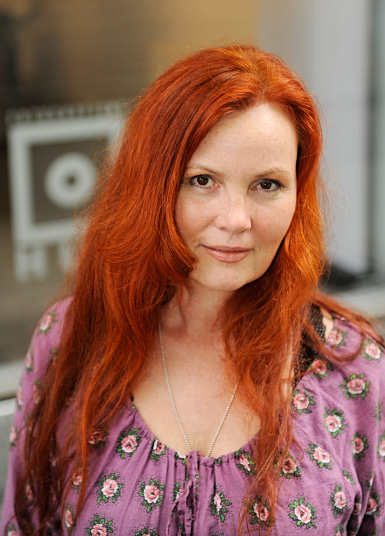
Anne Helene Gjelstad

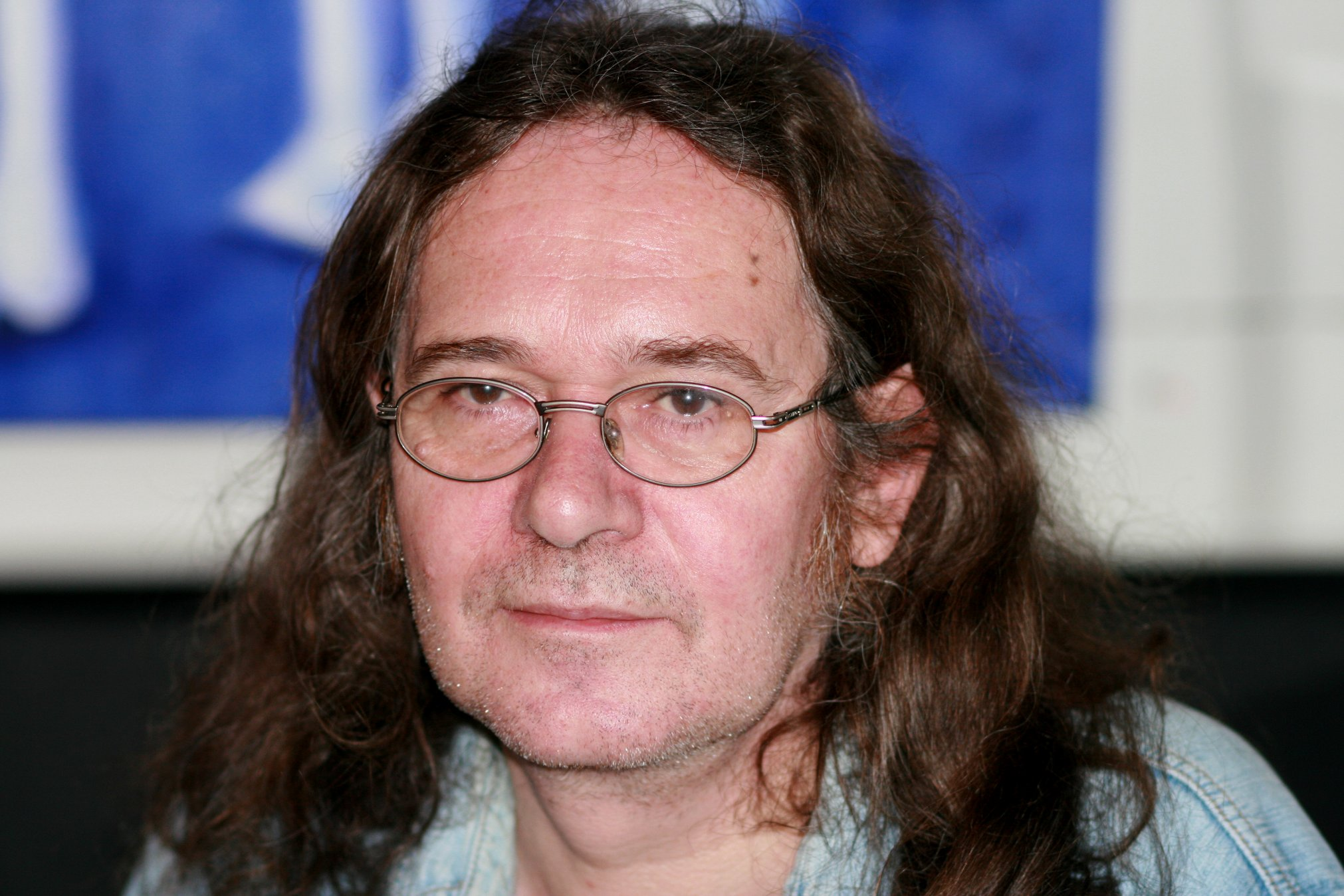
Ingvar Ambjørnsen

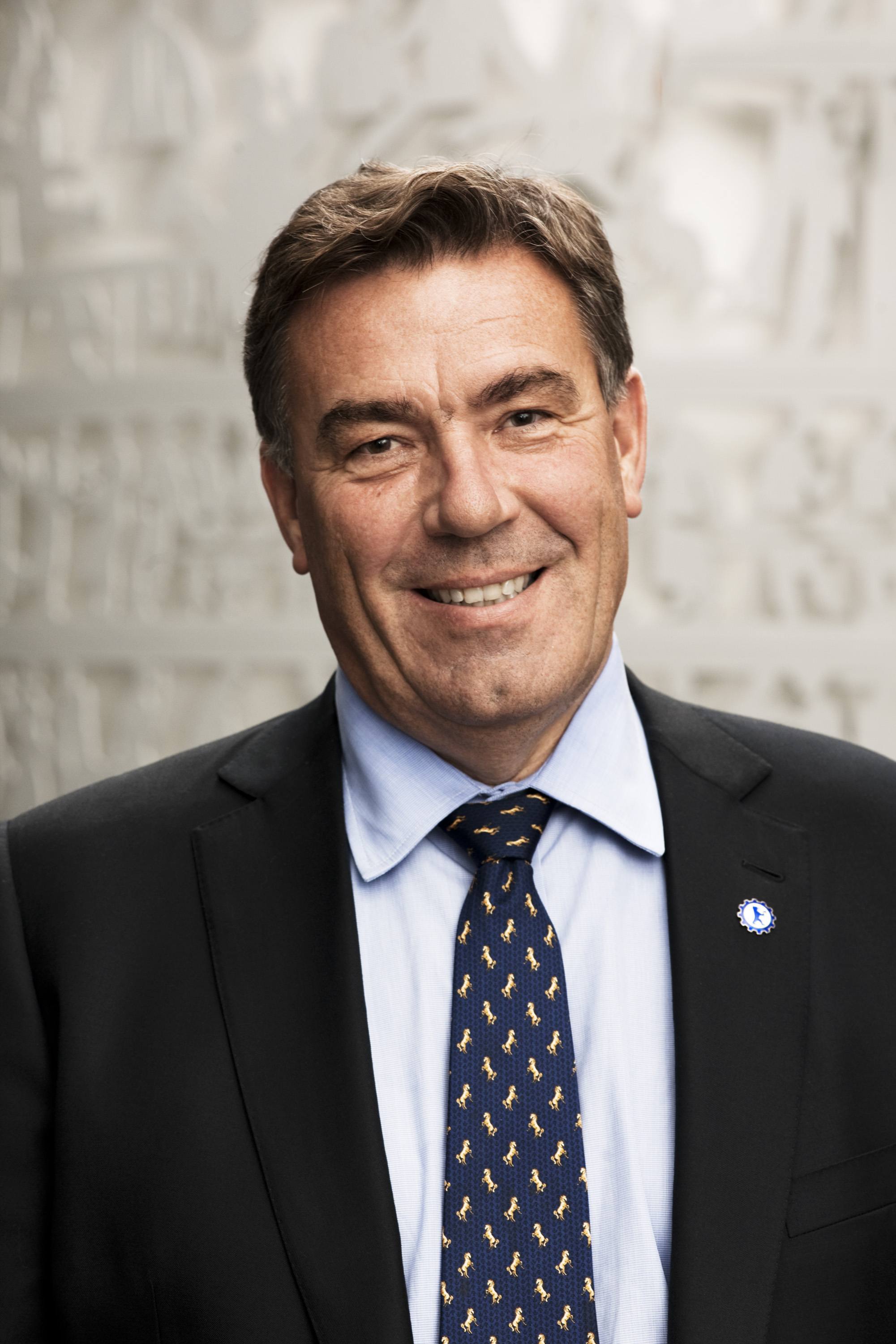
Stein Erik Hagen

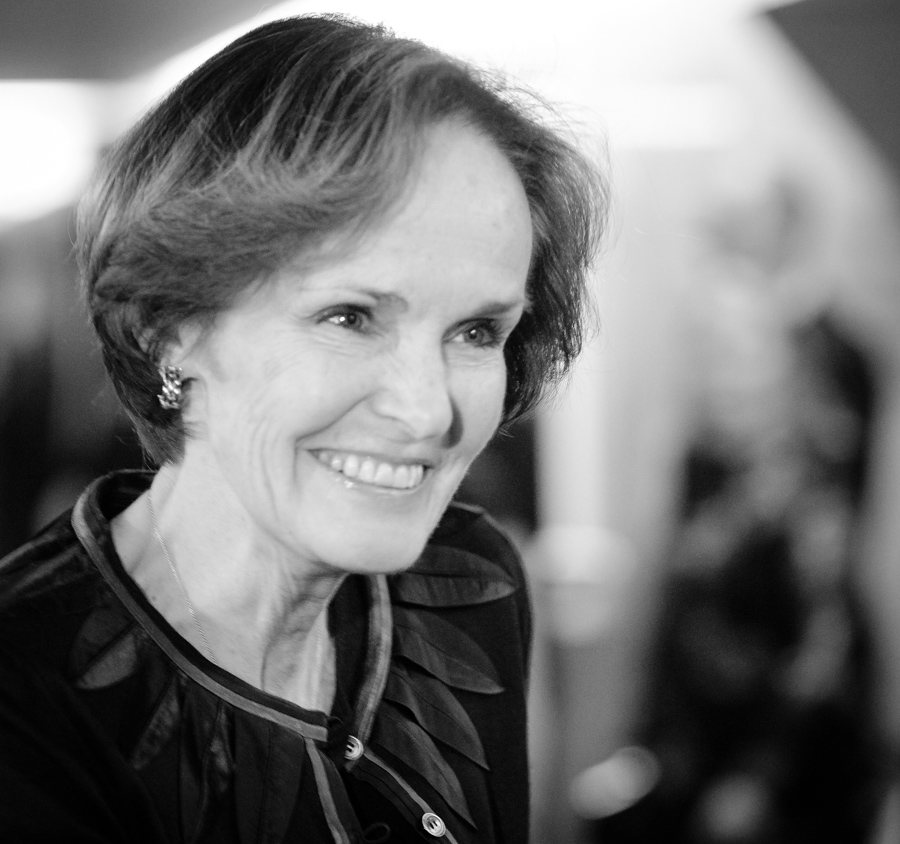
Anette S. Olsen

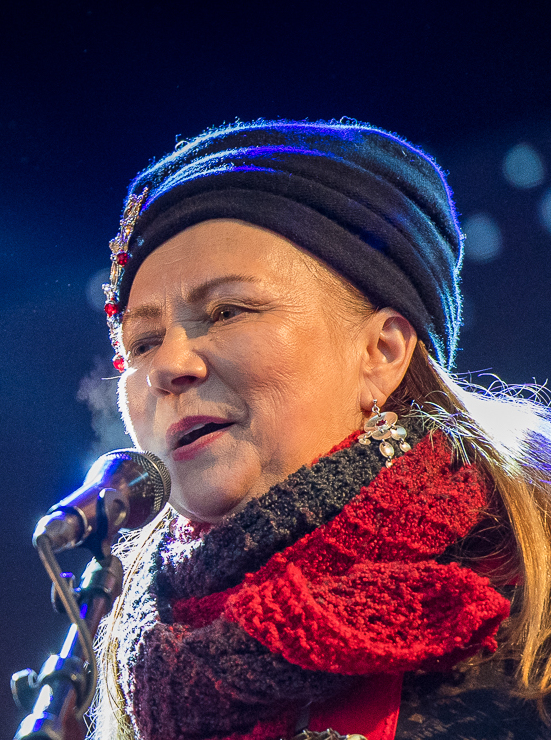
Mari Boine

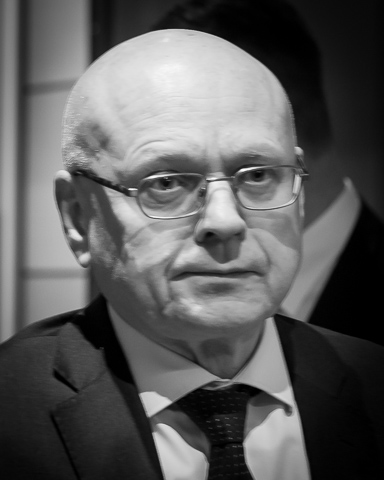
Bjørgulv Braanen in 2016

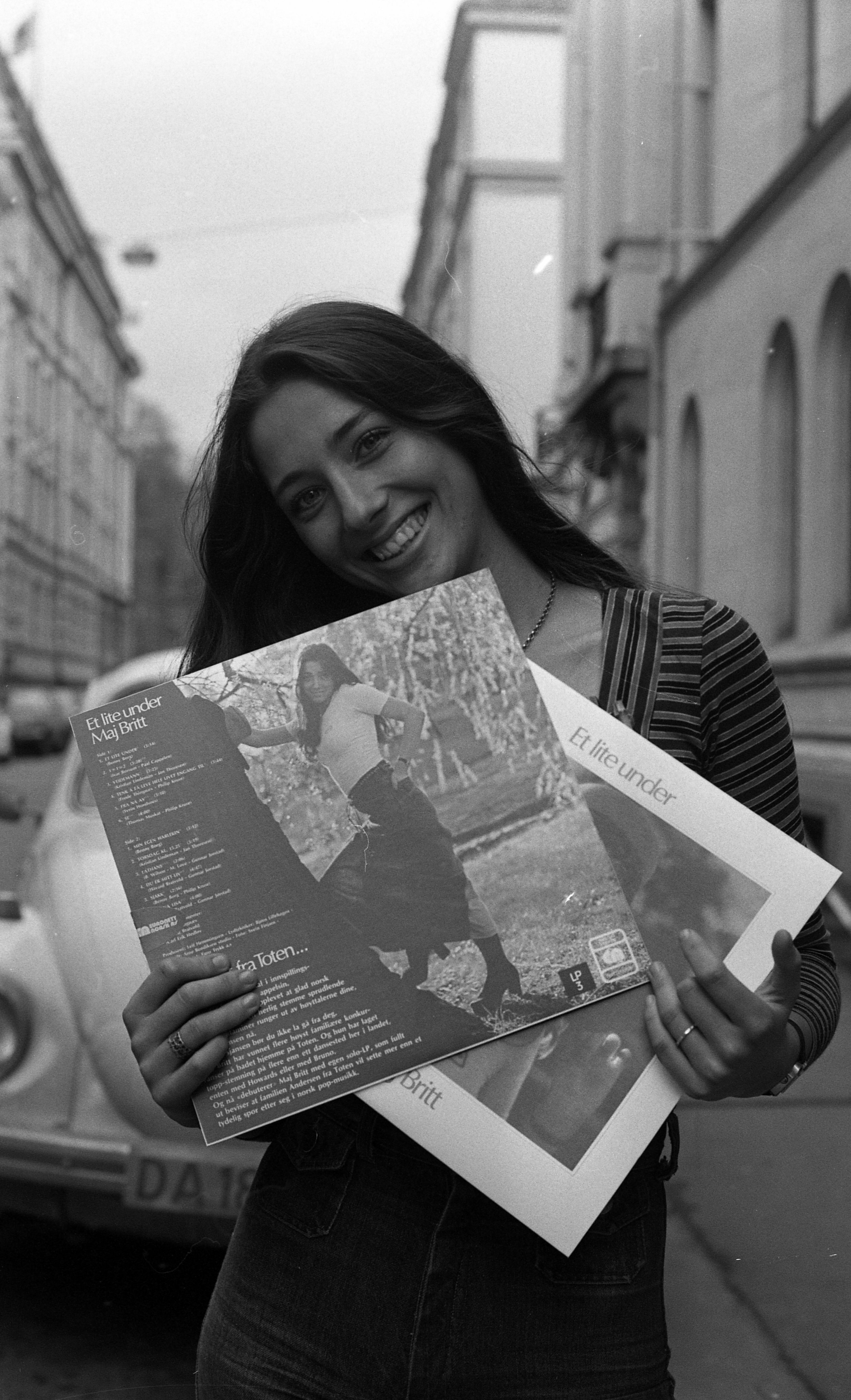
Maj Britt Andersen

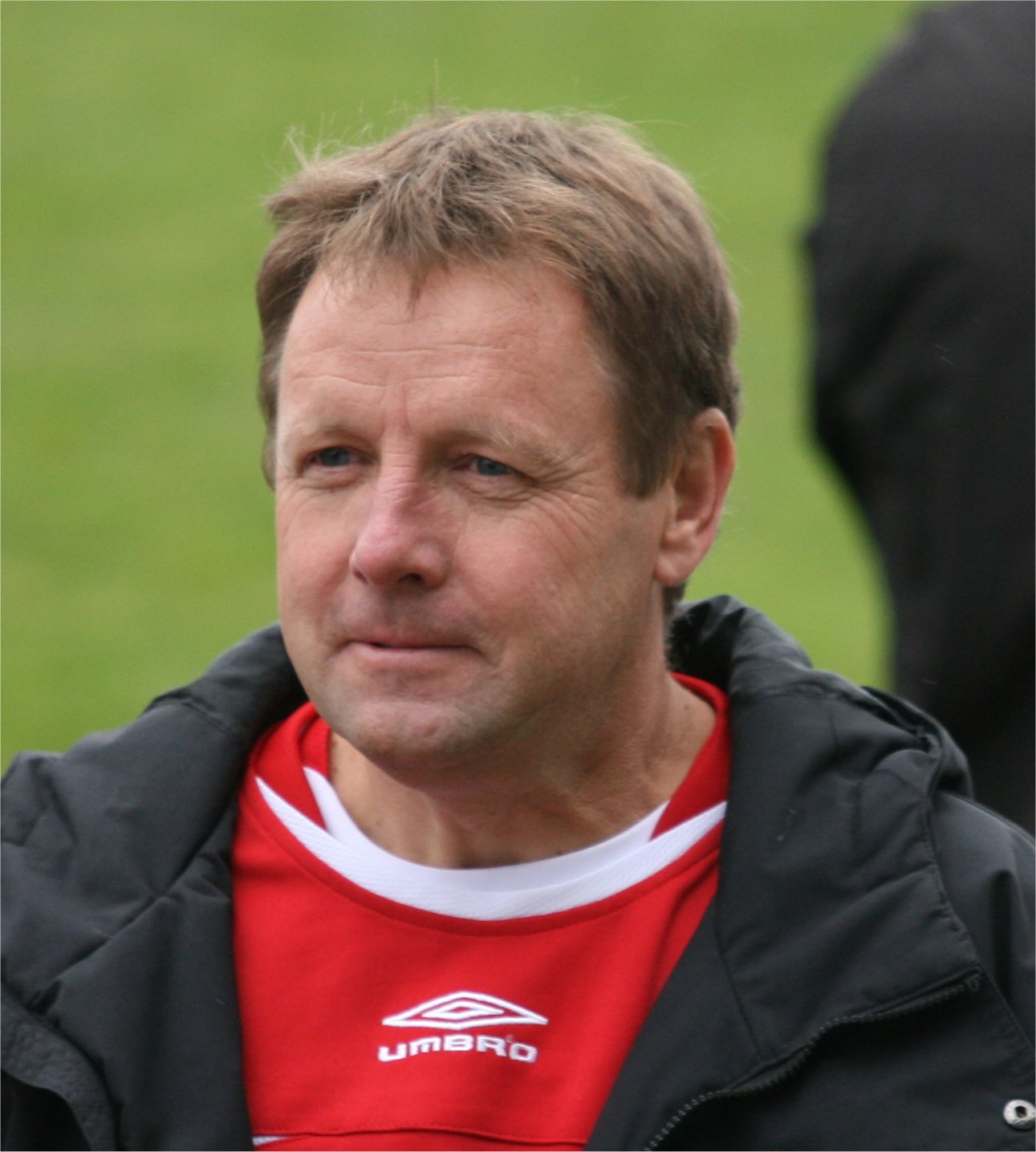
Bjarne Berntsen

- 5 January – Bente Irene Aaland, politician
- 9 January – Thorhild Widvey, politician
- 13 January – Bjørn Stordrange, jurist and politician
- 13 January – Harald Stanghelle, newspaper editor
- 15 January – Torun Lian, playwright, film director and novelist.
- 22 January – Tomm Kristiansen, journalist
- 24 January – Hanne Krogh, singer and actress
- 24 January – Helge Skaara, civil servant and diplomat
- 29 January – Odd Omland, politician
- 1 February – Bente Stein Mathisen politician.
- 1 February – Kjell Otto Moe, fencer
- 3 February – Tom Christiansen, ski jumper
- 8 February – Kjersti Holmen, actress
- 8 February – Eldar Sætre, businessman
- 9 February – Solfrid Johansen, sport rower
- 16 February – Stein Kollshaugen, footballer
- 18 February – Frøystein Gjesdal, educator
- 18 February – Jan Haaland, educator
- 18 February – Ivar Kristiansen, politician
- 22 February – Harald Aabrekk, footballer
- 22 February – Ivar Hognestad, politician
- 28 February (in Denmark) – Jens Wendelboe, trombonist, composer, music arranger and orchestra leader
- 1 March – Lars Steinar Ansnes, newspaper editor
- 2 March – Jan Georg Iversen, cyclist
- 2 March – Torgrim Sørnes, physician, historian and writer
- 10 March – Sidsel Ekholdt, artistic gymnast
- 12 March – Ove Aunli, cross-country skier
- 13 March – Geir-Ketil Hansen, politician
- 20 March – Minken Fosheim, actress and children's author
- 21 March – Ingrid Kristiansen, long-distance runner
- 25 March – Bente Grønli, disability athlete (d. 1996)
- 25 March – Tom Holthe, politician
- 8 April – Jan Roger Skyttesæter, archer
- 10 April – Grethe Mathiesen swimmer.
- 10 April – Torhild Bransdal, politician (died 2022).
- 11 April – Kristin Mile, jurist and civil servant
- 11 April – Reidar Sørensen, stage actor, film actor and theatre director.
- 12 April – Tor Olav Blostrupmoen, politician
- 13 April – Knut H. Kallerud, lawyer and judge
- 14 April – Rune Belsvik, novelist, playwright, short story writer and children's writer.
- 14 April – Knut N. Kjær, economist
- 15 April – Jim Marthinsen, ice hockey player
- 18 April – Olemic Thommessen, politician
- 25 April – Gro Sandberg, artistic gymnast
- 27 April – Magne Rommetveit, politician
- 27 April – Elisabeth Walaas, civil servant, diplomat and politician
- 29 April – Sten Ture Jensen, magazine editor and investor
- 29 April – Morgan Lindstrøm, artist, composer, and synthesizer-performer
- 29 April – Ketil Stokkan, pop artist
- 4 May – Rune Resaland, diplomat
- 7 May – John Ole Aspli, politician
- 9 May – Anne Helene Gjelstad, photographer and fashion designer
- 13 May – Anne Kristin Sydnes, politician (d. 2017)
- 19 May – Geir Digerud, cyclist.
- 20 May – Ingvar Ambjørnsen, writer (d. 2025)
- 20 May – Pål Jacobsen, footballer
- 21 May – Gunnar Gundersen, politician
- 21 May – Kai G. Henriksen, businessman (d. 2016)
- 22 May – Eva Isaksen, film director
- 22 May – May Irene Olsen, sport shooter
- 1 June – Stephan Barratt-Due, violinist
- 9 June – Berit Aunli, cross-country skier
- 13 June – Olav Sigurd Kjesbu, fisheries biologist
- 15 June – Tron Erik Hovind, politician
- 18 June – Christen Sveaas, businessman
- 19 June – Jon Rangfred Hanssen, racing cyclist
- 19 June – Nils Johnson, actor and theatre director
- 24 June – Turid Leirvoll, politician
- 28 June – Per Bergerud, ski jumper
- 28 June – Inger Giskeødegård, illustrator
- 30 June – Olav Gjelsvik, philosopher
- 4 July – Rita H. Roaldsen, politician
- 6 July – Dag Olav Hessen, writer and biologist
- 7 July – Øystein Wiik, actor, singer and novelist
- 9 July – Anne Bøe, poet.
- 10 July – Anders Heger, publisher and writer
- 16 July – Einar Rasmussen, sprint canoeist
- 19 July – Marit Sandvik, jazz singer
- 21 July – Sverre Quale, civil servant and businessman
- 22 July – Stein Erik Hagen, businessman
- 22 July – Morten Jentoft, journalist
- 29 July – Olav Øygard, Lutheran prelate
- 4 August – Nina Søby, cyclist
- 8 August – Michael Momyr, politician
- 10 August – Lars Martin Myhre, composer, guitarist, pianist, singer and producer (died 2024).
- 11 August – Norunn Tveiten Benestad, politician
- 11 August – Lars Ødegård, organizational leader and politician
- 12 August – Marit Westergaard, linguist
- 15 August – Inge Ryan, politician
- 17 August – Sissel Grottenberg, long-distance runner
- 20 August – Jan Henry T. Olsen, politician (d. 2018)
- 23 August – Valgerd Svarstad Haugland, politician and Minister
- 28 August – Cindy Haug, writer (d. 2018).
- 29 August – Bernt Rougthvedt, historian, biographer and thriller/crime writer (d. 2019)
- 1 September – Hilde Hefte, jazz singer
- 5 September – Eva Lian, politician
- 7 September – Eilif Nedberg, luger
- 8 September – Eivin One Pedersen, jazz musician (d. 2012)
- 12 September – Dag Otto Lauritzen, cyclist
- 15 September – Otto Gregussen, politician
- 17 September – Bjørn Rune Gjelsten, businessman and Offshore powerboat racing World Champion
- 18 September – Odd Lirhus, biathlete
- 19 September – Eivind Aadland, conductor and violinist
- 20 September – Svein Inge Valvik, discus thrower
- 22 September – Reidar Lorentzen, javelin thrower.
- 22 September – Hans Henrik Scheel, social economist and civil servant
- 24 September – Anette S. Olsen, businesswoman
- 28 September – Helge Holden, mathematician
- 30 September – Sven-Roald Nystø, politician
- 1 October – Terje Krokstad, biathlete
- 2 October – Jan-Henrik Fredriksen, politician
- 5 October – Tor Erik Jenstad, linguist, dictionary editor, and traditional Norwegian folk musician
- 9 October – Geir Langslet, jazz pianist and band leader
- 10 October – Bjørn Erik Hollevik, politician
- 20 October – Arne O. Holm, journalist and newspaper editor.
- 21 October – Arne Sandstø, footballer
- 22 October – Olav Gunnar Ballo, politician
- 23 October – Svein Dag Hauge, jazz musician
- 27 October – Finn Skårderud, psychiatrist
- 1 November – Anne Sender, lecturer and debater.
- 4 November – Harald Magnus Andreassen, economist
- 5 November – Ketil Gudim, dancer and actor
- 7 November (in the Soviet Union) – Mikhail Alperin, Soviet-Norwegian jazz pianist (d. 2018)
- 8 November – Mari Boine, Sami musician
- 8 November – Jon Gunnes, politician.
- 14 November – Bjørgulv Braanen, newspaper editor
- 15 November – Maj Britt Andersen, singer.
- 24 November (in India) – Nita Kapoor, Indian-Norwegian cultural director
- 29 November – Jørgen Sørlie, footballer
- 1 December – Lars Ole Vaagen, civil servant and diplomat
- 3 December – Morten Søgård, curler
- 8 December – Liv Steen, actress
- 9 December – Kari Bremnes, singer and songwriter
- 10 December – Øystein Hauge, writer
- 12 December – Geir Holmsen, jazz musician
- 18 December – Bent Hamer, film director
- 21 December – Bjarne Berntsen, footballer
- 22 December – Arne Gilje, competition rower and twice World Champion
- 22 December – Signe Iversen, Sami language consultant and author of children's literature
- 25 December – Isak Arne Refvik, footballer
- 31 December – Torolf Nordbø, musician and comedian

=== Full date missing ===
- Eivind Aadland, conductor and violinist
- Iulie Aslaksen, economist
- Kate Augestad, singer
- Ivar Braut, theologian and priest
- Laila Brenden, writer
- Olav Rune Ekeland Bastrup, writer and historian
- Leif-Arne Langøy, businessman
- Per Roger Lauritzen, non-fiction writer
- Arne Tovik, journalist (d. 2009)
- Elsbeth Tronstad, businesswoman and politician

== Notable deaths ==
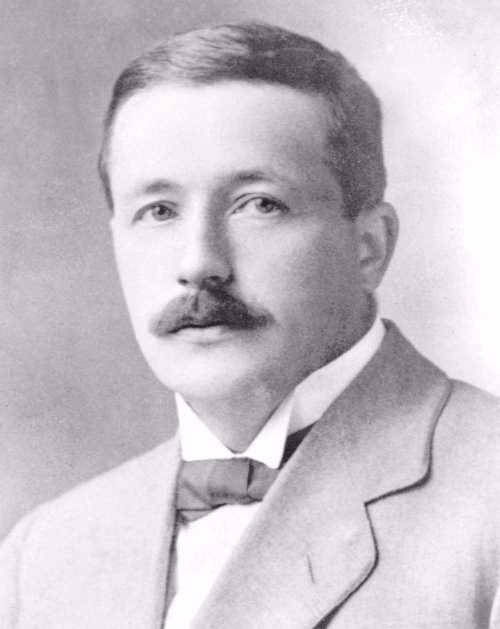
Anders Todal

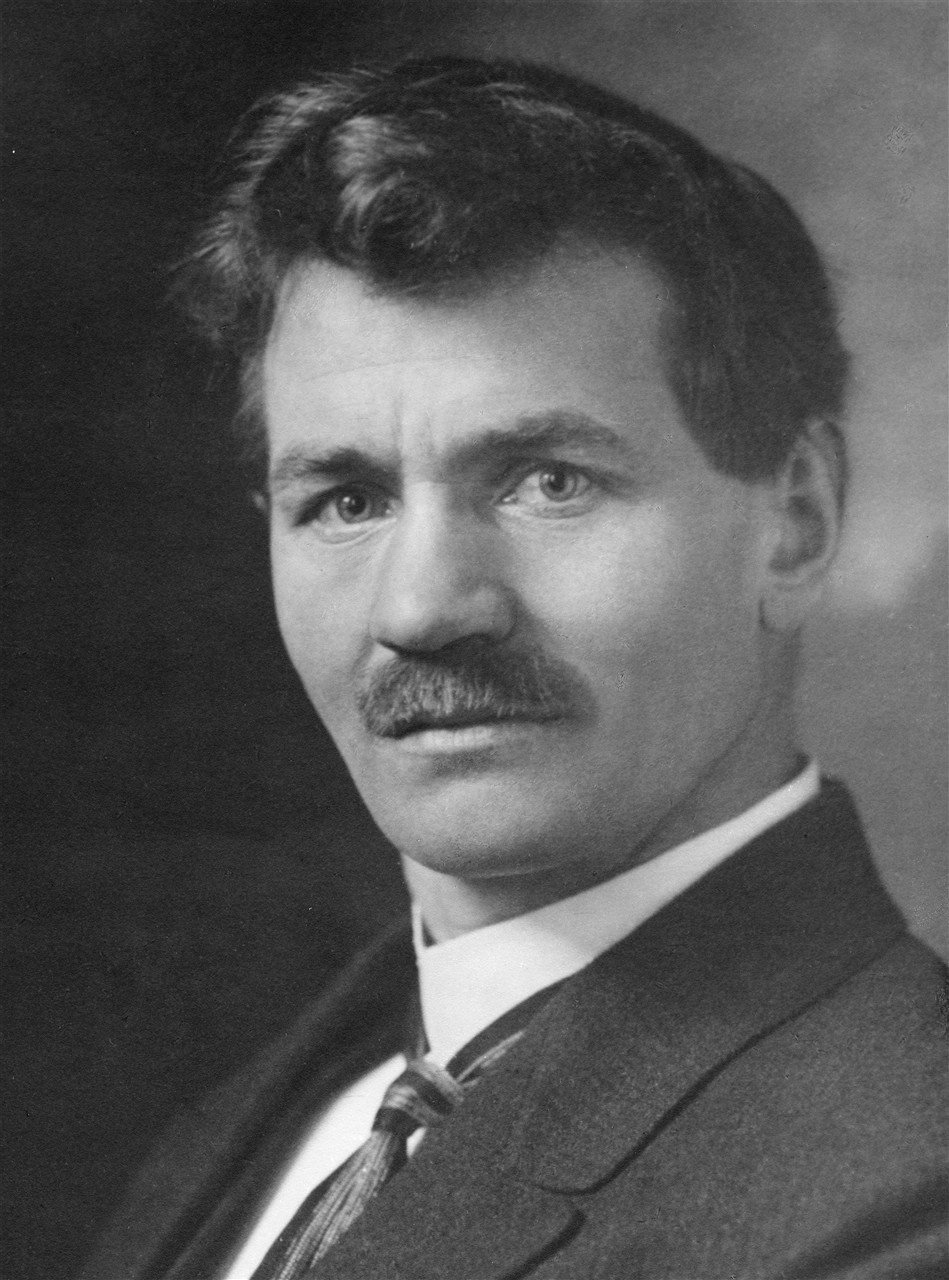
Halvor Floden

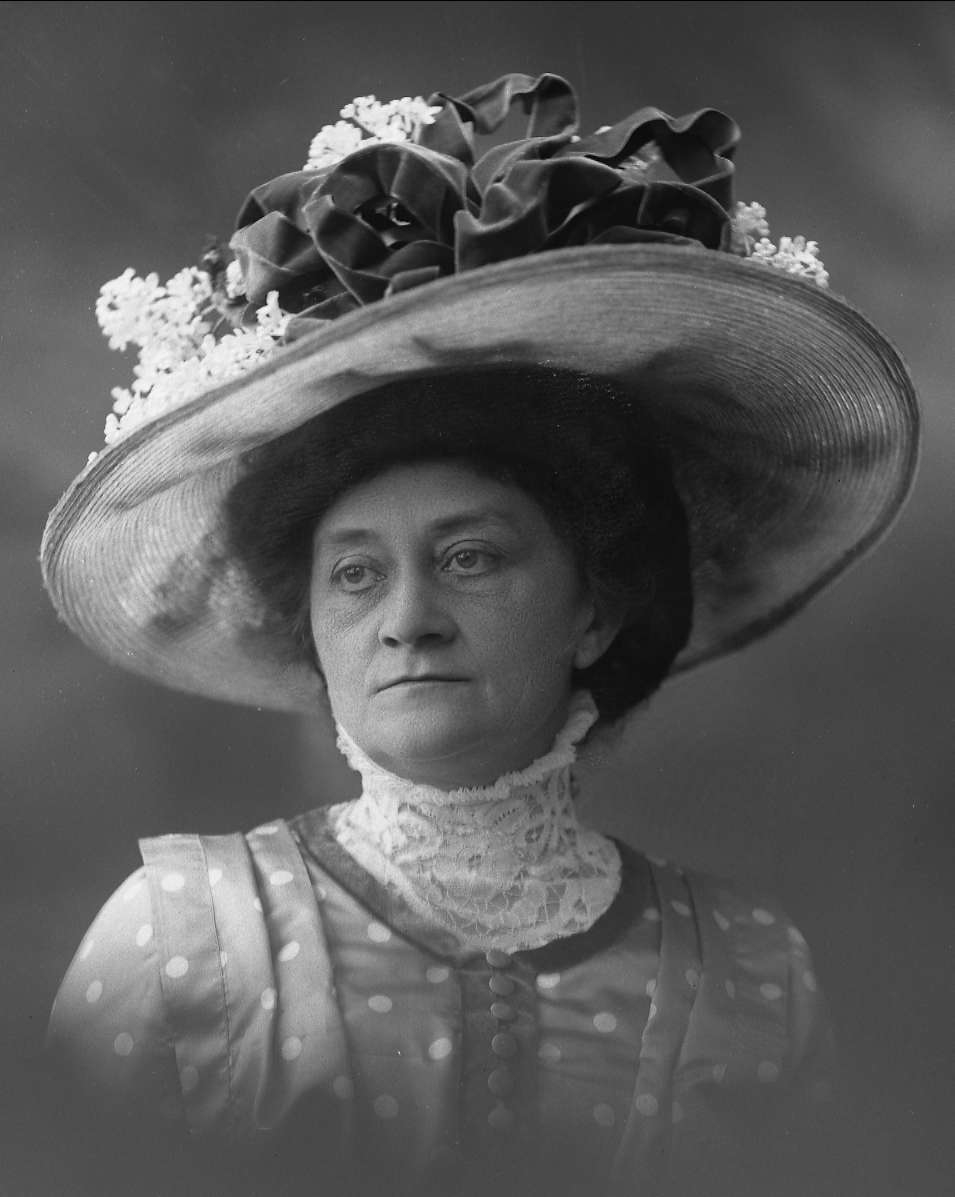
Hildur Andersen is regarded to be the model for the character "Hilde Wangel" in Ibsen's play The Master Builder.

- 5 January – Caroline Boman Hansen, Swedish–Norwegian hotelier (b. 1860).
- 15 January – Bertram Dybwad Brochmann, businessperson, writer and politician (b. 1881).
- 18 January – Frantz Rosenberg, sport shooter (b. 1883)
- 25 January – Schak Bull, architect (born 1858)
- 27 January – Harald Heide, violinist, conductor, and composer (b. 1876)
- 29 January – Ole Holm, rifle shooter (b. 1870)
- 31 January – Sigvald Svendsen, politician (born 1895)
- 1 February – Carl Platou, civil servant and politician (b. 1885)
- 19 February – Marit Aarum, economist, liberal politician, civil servant and feminist (b. 1903)
- 21 February – Paul Christian Frank, barrister, politician, organizer and non-fiction writer (b. 1879).
- 21 February – August Nielsen, architect (b. 1877)
- 24 February – Ivar Jørgensen, civil servant and politician (b. 1877)
- 6 March – Harald Hansen, gymnast (b. 1884)
- 6 March – Anders Todal, teacher, politician and farmer (b. 1883).
- 12 March – Reidar Tønsberg, gymnast and Olympic silver medallist (born 1893)
- 18 March – Ivar Jacobsen Norevik, politician (born 1900)
- 20 March – Helga Ramstad, politician (b. 1875)
- 28 March – Erik Colban, diplomat (born 1876)
- 29 March – Endre Kristian Vestvik, politician (born 1894)
- 31 March – Robert Sæther, schoolteacher, newspaper editor and politician (b. 1875)
- 2 April – Ivar Alnæs, teacher and linguist (b. 1868)
- 23 April – Anna Bøe, journalist and magazine editor (b. 1864).
- 25 April – Mikal Grøvan, politician (born 1899)
- 28 April – Amund Rasmussen Skarholt, politician (born 1892)
- 2 May – Ingebjørg Øisang, politician (born 1892)
- 16 May – Christian Staib, sailor and Olympic gold medallist (born 1892)
- 18 May – Einar Meidell Hopp, broadcasting personality (b. 1899).
- 31 May – Svend Foyn Bruun Sr., naval officer, ship-owner and whaler, and politician (b. 1883)
- 1 June – Jens Bull, jurist and diplomat (born 1886).
- 5 June – Mathias Glomnes, sport shooter (b. 1869)
- 9 June – Hans Bergsland, fencer, sports official and businessman (b. 1878)
- 18 June – Niels Christian Ditleff, diplomat (born 1881)
- 20 June – Willy Gilbert, sailor and Olympic gold medalist (b. 1881)
- 28 June – Oliver Møystad, engineer, farmer and forest owner (b. 1892)
- 30 June – Thorleif Lund, stage and film actor (b. 1880)
- 30 June – Erling Sandberg, banker and politician (b. 1879)
- 7 July – Andreas Moe, merchant and politician (b. 1883)
- 9 July – Lul Krag, painter (b. 1878).
- 27 July – Arnold Holmboe, politician and Minister (born 1873)
- 28 August – Johan Nordhagen, artist (born 1856)
- 7 September – Gudmund Hoel, architect (b. 1877)
- 22 September – Ewald Bosse, sociologist and economist (b. 1880)
- 29 September – Herman Scheel, judge and politician (b. 1859)
- 13 October – Otto Tangen, Nordic skier (b. 1886)
- 28 October – Øyvind Alfred Stensrud, politician (born 1887)
- 12 November – Olaf Skramstad, politician (b. 1894)
- 14 November – Olaf Stang, engineer (b. 1871)
- 14 November – Johan Nicolai Støren, bishop (b. 1871)
- 17 November – Dina Aschehoug, painter (b. 1861)
- 18 November – Christian Arnesen, wrestler (b. 1890)
- 3 December – Halvor Floden, schoolteacher, children's writer, novelist, poet and playwright (b. 1884).
- 8 December – Finn Lambrechts, lieutenant general of the Royal Norwegian Air Force (b. 1900).
- 12 December – Jakob Friis, politician (born 1883)
- 16 December – Frithjof Olstad, rower and Olympic bronze medallist (born 1890)
- 17 December – Lauritz Sand, resistance fighter (born 1879)
- 18 December – Erik Vangberg, carpenter, trade unionist and politician (b. 1874).
- 20 December – Hildur Andersen, pianist and music pedagogue (b. 1864) .
- 21 December – Aksel Refstad, Nordic combined skier (b. 1873)
- 28 December – Oskar Olsen, speed skater and Olympic silver medallist (born 1897).

=== Full date missing ===
- Anton Ludvig Alvestad, politician and Minister (born 1883)
- Carl Severin Bentzen, tailor and politician (b. 1882)
- Sigval Bergesen, ship-owner and politician (born 1863)
- Sigurd Christian Brinch, manager and politician (b. 1874)
- Eyvind Getz, barrister (b. 1888)
- Helmer Hanssen, polar explorer (born 1870)
- Halvor Hansson, military officer (b. 1886)
- Nikolai Nissen Paus, surgeon (born 1877)
- Harald Smedvik, gymnast and Olympic silver medallist (born 1888)
