= Arne Holm =

Arne Holm may refer to:

- Arne Holm (athlete) (born 1961), Swedish athlete
- Arne O. Holm (born 1956), Norwegian journalist and newspaper editor
- Arne E. Holm (1911–2009), Norwegian painter, graphic artist and architect
