= Hovind =

Hovind is a Norwegian surname. Notable people with the surname include:

- Carl Oscar Hovind (1901–1982), Norwegian chess player
- Kent Hovind (born 1953), American Christian fundamentalist and tax protestor
- Tron Erik Hovind (born 1956), Norwegian politician
