= Urd (magazine) =

Former Norwegian women's magazine

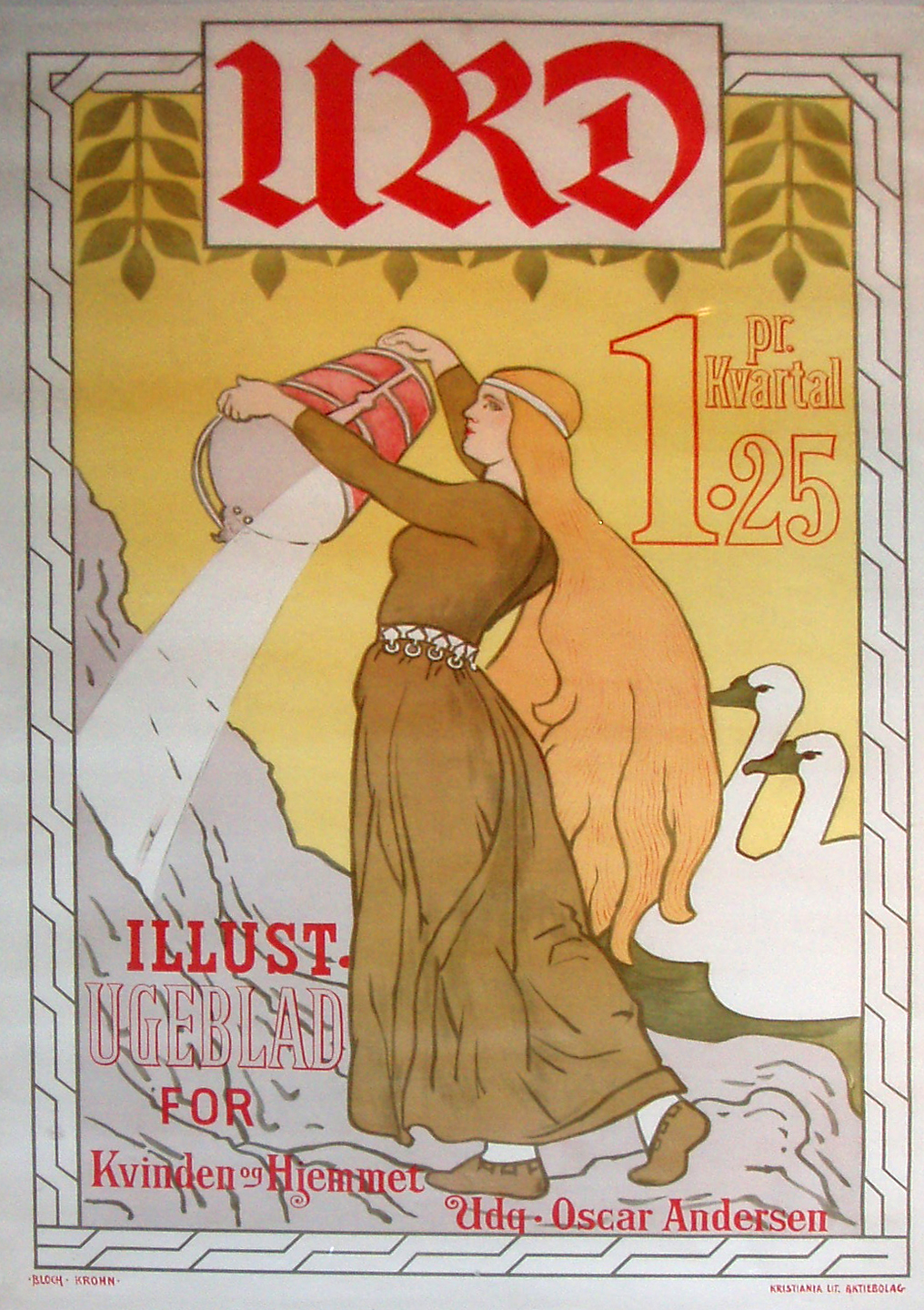
Poster by Andreas Bloch and Olaf Krohn.

Urd was a Norwegian women's magazine that existed from 1879 to 1958.

== History and profile ==
Urd was named after Urðr, a guardian of the Yggdrasil in Norse mythology. It was founded by sisters Cecilie and Anna Bøe in 1879. Anna was the editor-in-chief until 1933, whereas Cecilie had responsibility for finance. The magazine was marked by a higher content of art and culture than many other women's magazines, and had a distinct faith in progress, and a Christian profile. It also included articles concerning the struggle for women's suffrage.

The magazine became defunct in 1958 due to weak finances.
