= Per Ludvig Magnus =

Norwegian diplomat

Per Ludvig Magnus (9 April 1945 – 19 June 2015) was a Norwegian diplomat.

He was born in Oslo, and is a cand.jur. by education. He started working for the Norwegian Ministry of Foreign Affairs in 1974, and was the Norwegian ambassador to Saudi Arabia from 1991 to 1992. He served as deputy Under-secretary of State in the Ministry of Foreign Affairs from 1992 to 1996, the Norwegian ambassador to the OECD from 1991 to 2001, assistant to the Permanent Under-Secretary of State in the Ministry of Foreign Affairs from 2001 to 2005 and the Norwegian ambassador to Spain from 2005 to 2010.

Diplomatic posts
Preceded by Kjell-Martin Fredriksen	Norway's ambassador to Spain; 2005–2010	Succeeded by Torgeir Larsen
