= Another Round =

2020 film by Thomas Vinterberg

- Danish theatrical release poster
- Danish: Druk
- Directed by: Thomas Vinterberg
- Screenplay by: Thomas Vinterberg; Tobias Lindholm
- Produced by: Sisse Graum Jørgensen; Kasper Dissing
- Starring: Mads Mikkelsen; Thomas Bo Larsen; Magnus Millang; Lars Ranthe
- Cinematography: Sturla Brandth Grøvlen
- Edited by: Anne Østerud; Janus Billeskov Jansen
- Production companies: Zentropa Entertainments; Film i Väst; Topkapi Films; Zentropa Sweden; Zentropa Netherlands
- Distributed by: Nordisk Film Distribution (Denmark)
- Release dates: 12 September 2020 (TIFF); 24 September 2020 (Denmark)
- Running time: 116 minutes
- Countries: Denmark; Sweden; Netherlands
- Language: Danish
- Budget: kr33.5 million (€4.5 million)
- Box office: $21.7 million

Another Round (Danish: Druk, lit. 'Binge drinking') is a 2020 black comedy-drama film directed by Thomas Vinterberg, co-written with Tobias Lindholm. Starring Mads Mikkelsen, Thomas Bo Larsen, Magnus Millang, and Lars Ranthe, the film follows four high school teachers who experiment with maintaining a constant level of alcohol in their blood to boost creativity and confidence.

Premiering at the 2020 Toronto International Film Festival, the film won the Academy Award for Best International Feature Film and multiple other accolades. The film is dedicated to Vinterberg's daughter, Ida, who died during production.

== Plot ==
Teachers Martin, Tommy, Peter, and Nikolaj are colleagues and friends who work at a gymnasium school in Copenhagen. All four struggle with unmotivated students and feel that their lives have become boring and stale. Martin is confronted by his senior students and their parents, who express that he has become a barrier to their passing their history exams. At a dinner celebrating Nikolaj's 40th birthday, the group discusses a theory inspired by the work of psychiatrist Finn Skårderud—that humans are born with a blood alcohol content (BAC) deficiency of 0.05% and that maintaining a BAC of 0.05% makes one more creative and relaxed.

The friends decide to embark on an experiment to test Skårderud's theory. They start a group log documenting their experiences as they drink at regular intervals to maintain this blood alcohol level. Two of them have personal struggles that make the experiment particularly appealing: Martin is depressed and alienated from his family and students, while Nikolaj's wife seems to have contempt for him. They agree on a set of rules: their BAC should never drop below 0.05% during the day on weekdays, and they should not drink after 8:00 p.m. or on weekends. Each man finds his own way to sneak alcohol during the day while teaching or coaching children, but they never drink and drive, with 0.05% being the legal limit.

Within a short period, all four men find their work and private lives more enjoyable and successful. Martin, in particular, is delighted as he reconnects with his wife and children. His teaching becomes inspired, and his students begin enjoying class and respecting him. He even incorporates alcohol into his history lessons, engaging his heavy-drinking students. Encouraged by their success, the group decides to take the experiment further, increasing their BAC minimum to 0.10%. Still feeling the benefits, they eventually push the boundaries further, deciding one night to drink to oblivion to test its liberating effects. However, after returning home incapacitated, both Martin and Nikolaj are confronted by their families. Martin's family expresses concern, revealing they have known he has been drinking for weeks. He and his wife acknowledge their growing distance, and she admits to infidelity. Martin lashes out and leaves, heading to Tommy's. The group abandons the experiment. Martin and his wife separate, and, when he tries to make amends, she rejects him.

All members of the group stop drinking during the day, except for Tommy, whom the others try to support. However, at a faculty meeting where the headmaster reveals that teachers have been drinking at work, Tommy arrives visibly intoxicated. Later, he boards his boat while drunk, takes his old dog with him, motors out onto the bay, and ultimately goes overboard, drowning at sea.

After Tommy's funeral, the three remaining friends go out to dinner to celebrate his life, enjoying sparkling wine. While dining, Martin receives a text from his wife saying she misses him. As they sit by the harbour, recently graduated students pass by, celebrating in their customary drunken revelry. Martin, Peter, and Nikolaj join them in drinking and dancing. Martin, a former jazz ballet dancer, finally gives in to his colleagues' previous urgings and dances with the students. His movements grow increasingly energetic and joyous before he finishes his dance by spontaneously jumping into the sea.

== Cast ==
- Mads Mikkelsen as Martin
- Thomas Bo Larsen as Tommy
- Magnus Millang as Nikolaj
- Lars Ranthe as Peter
- Maria Bonnevie as Anika, Martin's wife
- Helene Reingaard Neumann as Amalie, Nikolaj's wife
- Susse Wold as the school principal
- Magnus Sjørup as Jonas, Martin and Anika's older son
- Silas Cornelius Van as Kasper, Martin and Anika's younger son
- Albert Rudbeck Lindhardt as Sebastian, an anxious student
- Martin Greis-Rosenthal as the head waiter
- Frederik Winther Rasmussen as Malthe, a student
- Aksel Vedsegaard as Jason, a student
- Aya Grann as Josephine, a student

== Production ==
The film was based on a play Vinterberg had written while working at Burgtheater, Vienna. Additional inspiration came from Vinterberg's own daughter, Ida, who told him stories of the drinking culture within the Danish youth. Ida had originally pressed Vinterberg to adapt the play into a movie, and she was slated to play the daughter of Martin (Mads Mikkelsen). The story was originally "A celebration of alcohol based on the thesis that world history would have been different without alcohol." However, four days into filming, Ida was killed in a car accident. Following the tragedy, the script was reworked to become more life-affirming. "It should not just be about drinking. It was about being awakened to life," stated Vinterberg. Tobias Lindholm served as director in the week following the accident. The film was dedicated to Ida, and was partially filmed in her classroom with her classmates.

During production, the four main actors and Vinterberg would meet to drink just enough to let go of embarrassment in front of one another. They would also watch drunk people on YouTube to better understand how extremely inebriated people would act.

== Release ==
Another Round was set to have its world premiere at the 2020 Cannes Film Festival, prior to the festival's cancellation due to government restrictions prompted by the COVID-19 pandemic. The film instead had its world premiere at the Toronto International Film Festival. It also screened at the San Sebastián International Film Festival, where it competed for the Golden Shell, and opened Film Fest Gent 2020 in Belgium.

The film was released in Denmark on 24 September 2020, by Nordisk Film. The same month, Samuel Goldwyn Films acquired its U.S. distribution rights. It was also selected as opening film at the 51st International Film Festival of India.

== Reception ==
=== Critical response ===
On the review aggregator website Rotten Tomatoes, 93% of 233 critics' reviews are positive, with an average rating of 8.0/10. The website's consensus reads: "Take one part deftly directed tragicomedy, add a dash of Mads Mikkelsen in vintage form, and you've got Another Round – an intoxicating look at midlife crises." Metacritic, which uses a weighted average, assigned the film a score of 79 out of 100, based on 34 critics, indicating "generally favorable" reviews.

In 2025, Another Round was one of the films voted on for the "Readers' Choice" edition of The New York Times' list of "The 100 Best Movies of the 21st Century," finishing at number 243.

=== Accolades ===
Award	Date of ceremony	Category	Recipient(s)	Result	Ref
Academy Awards	25 April 2021	Best International Feature Film	Denmark	Won	
Academy Awards	25 April 2021	Best Director	Thomas Vinterberg	Nominated	
Adelaide Film Festival	25 October 2020	Feature Fiction Award	Another Round	Nominated	
Alliance of Women Film Journalists	4 January 2021	Best Non-English-Language Film	Another Round	Won	
BFI London Film Festival	18 October 2020	Best Film	Another Round	Won	
Bodil Awards	8 May 2021	Best Danish Film	Another Round	Won	
Bodil Awards	8 May 2021	Best Actor in a Leading Role	Mads Mikkelsen	Won	
Bodil Awards	8 May 2021	Best Actor in a Supporting Role	Lars Ranthe	Nominated	
Bodil Awards	8 May 2021	Best Actor in a Supporting Role	Magnus Millang	Nominated	
Bodil Awards	8 May 2021	Best Actor in a Supporting Role	Thomas Bo Larsen	Nominated	
Bodil Awards	8 May 2021	Best Screenplay	Thomas Vinterberg, Tobias Lindholm	Won	
British Academy Film Awards	11 April 2021	Best Film Not in the English Language	Thomas Vinterberg, Sisse Graum Jørgensen	Won	
British Academy Film Awards	11 April 2021	Best Direction	Thomas Vinterberg	Nominated	
British Academy Film Awards	11 April 2021	Best Actor in a Leading Role	Mads Mikkelsen	Nominated	
British Academy Film Awards	11 April 2021	Best Original Screenplay	Tobias Lindholm and Thomas Vinterberg	Nominated	
César Awards	12 March 2021	Best Foreign Film	Another Round	Won	
Chicago Film Critics Association Awards	21 December 2020	Best Foreign Language Film	Another Round	Won	
Critics' Choice Movie Awards	7 March 2021	Best Foreign Language Film	Another Round	Nominated	
European Film Awards	12 December 2020	Best Film	Another Round	Won	
European Film Awards	12 December 2020	Best Director	Thomas Vinterberg	Won	
European Film Awards	12 December 2020	Best Screenwriter	Thomas Vinterberg, Tobias Lindholm	Won	
European Film Awards	12 December 2020	Best Actor	Mads Mikkelsen	Won	
European Film Awards	12 December 2020	University Award		Nominated	
Film Fest Gent	24 October 2020	Canvas Audience Award	Another Round	Won	
Gaudí Awards	6 March 2022	Best European Film	Another Round	Won	
Golden Globe Awards	28 February 2021	Best Foreign Language Film	Another Round	Nominated	
Goya Awards	12 February 2022	Best European Film	Another Round	Won	
Grande Prêmio do Cinema Brasileiro	10 August 2022	Best International Film	Another Round	Nominated	
Houston Film Critics Society	18 January 2021	Best Film in a Foreign Language	Another Round	Nominated	
IndieWire Critics Poll	14 December 2020	Best International Film	Another Round	3rd place	
IndieWire Critics Poll	14 December 2020	Best Performance	Mads Mikkelsen	10th place	
London Film Critics' Circle	7 February 2021	Foreign Language Film of the Year	Another Round	Won	
LUX Prize	9 June 2021	LUX Audience Award	Another Round	Nominated	
Online Film Critics Society	25 January 2021	Best Film Not in the English Language	Another Round	Nominated	
Robert Awards	6 February 2021	Best Danish Film	Thomas Vinterberg	Won	
Robert Awards	6 February 2021	Best Director	Thomas Vinterberg	Won	
Robert Awards	6 February 2021	Best Original Screenplay	Thomas Vinterberg, Tobias Lindholm	Won	
Robert Awards	6 February 2021	Best Cinematography	Sturla Brandth Grøvlen	Nominated	
Robert Awards	6 February 2021	Best Editing	Anne Østerud, Janus Billeskov Jansen	Won	
Robert Awards	6 February 2021	Best Actor	Mads Mikkelsen	Won	
Robert Awards	6 February 2021	Best Supporting Actor	Lars Ranthe	Nominated	
Robert Awards	6 February 2021	Best Supporting Actor	Magnus Millang	Nominated	
Robert Awards	6 February 2021	Best Supporting Actor	Thomas Bo Larsen	Nominated	
Robert Awards	6 February 2021	Best Supporting Actress	Maria Bonnevie	Nominated	
Robert Awards	6 February 2021	Best Production Design	Sabine Hviid	Nominated	
Robert Awards	6 February 2021	Best Sound	Jan Schermer, Hans Møller	Nominated	
San Diego Film Critics Society	11 January 2021	Best International Film	Another Round	Nominated	
San Francisco Bay Area Film Critics Circle	18 January 2021	Best Foreign Language Film	Another Round	Won	
San Sebastián International Film Festival	26 September 2020	Silver Shell for Best Actor	Mads Mikkelsen, Thomas Bo Larsen, Magnus Millang, Lars Ranthe	Won	
San Sebastián International Film Festival	26 September 2020	Premio Feroz Zinemaldia	Another Round	Won	
San Sebastián International Film Festival	26 September 2020	SIGNIS Award	Thomas Vinterberg	Won	
San Sebastián International Film Festival	26 September 2020	Silver Shell for Best Director	Thomas Vinterberg	Nominated	
San Sebastián International Film Festival	26 September 2020	Golden Shell	Thomas Vinterberg	Nominated	
St. Louis Film Critics Association	17 January 2021	Best Foreign Film	Another Round	Won	

== Remake ==
An American English-language remake of the film is planned to star Leonardo DiCaprio and to be produced by Appian Way Productions, Endeavor Content, and Makeready. In January 2024, it was reported that Chris Rock was attached to direct the movie, with Stuart Blumberg writing a draft script. On the choice of director, Vinterberg jokingly said: "If it's shit, he'll get slapped again."

== See also ==
- List of submissions to the 93rd Academy Awards for Best International Feature Film
- List of Danish submissions for the Academy Award for Best International Feature Film
