= Johan Christopher Vibe =

Norwegian civil servant and diplomat

Johan Christopher Vibe (born 28 June 1963) is a Norwegian civil servant and diplomat.

He holds the cand.jur. degree and was hired in the Ministry of Foreign Affairs in 1990. He served as head of department there from 2007, then counsellor at the Norwegian embassy to the United States from 2009. He then served Norway's ambassador to Spain from 2012 to 2016 and to Colombia from 2016 to 2018, before returning to the Ministry of Foreign Affairs as deputy under-secretary of state.

Diplomatic posts
| Preceded by Torgeir Larsen | Norwegian ambassador to Spain; 2012–2015 | Succeeded by Helge Skaara |
