= Torgeir Larsen =

Norwegian diplomat and politician

Torgeir Larsen (born 2 July 1967) is a Norwegian diplomat and politician of the Labour Party.

Larsen attended the Befalsskolen for marinen and holds the cand.polit. degree from the University of Oslo and an MSc in economics from the London School of Economics. He was a journalist in the Norwegian Broadcasting Corporation from 1992, then consultant in the Norwegian Ministry of Foreign Affairs from 1995. From 1997 to 2000 he was an embassy secretary in Palestine, then an adviser in the secretariat for the Minister of Foreign Affairs from 2000 to 2001. From 2002 to 2006 he was the societal affairs and debate editor in Dagbladet. He then headed the secretariat for the Minister of Foreign Affairs from 2006 to 2010, served as Norway's ambassador to Spain from 2010 to 2011 and State Secretary in the Ministry of Foreign Affairs from 2011. In 2013 he left Stoltenberg's Second Cabinet to work in Statoil, but in 2015 he rejoined Jens Stoltenberg as the new NATO director's chief of cabinet.

Diplomatic posts
Preceded by Per Ludvig Magnus	Norwegian ambassador to Spain; 2010–2011	Succeeded by Johan Christopher Vibe
