= Magnus Millang =

Danish screenwriter, actor, comedian and film director

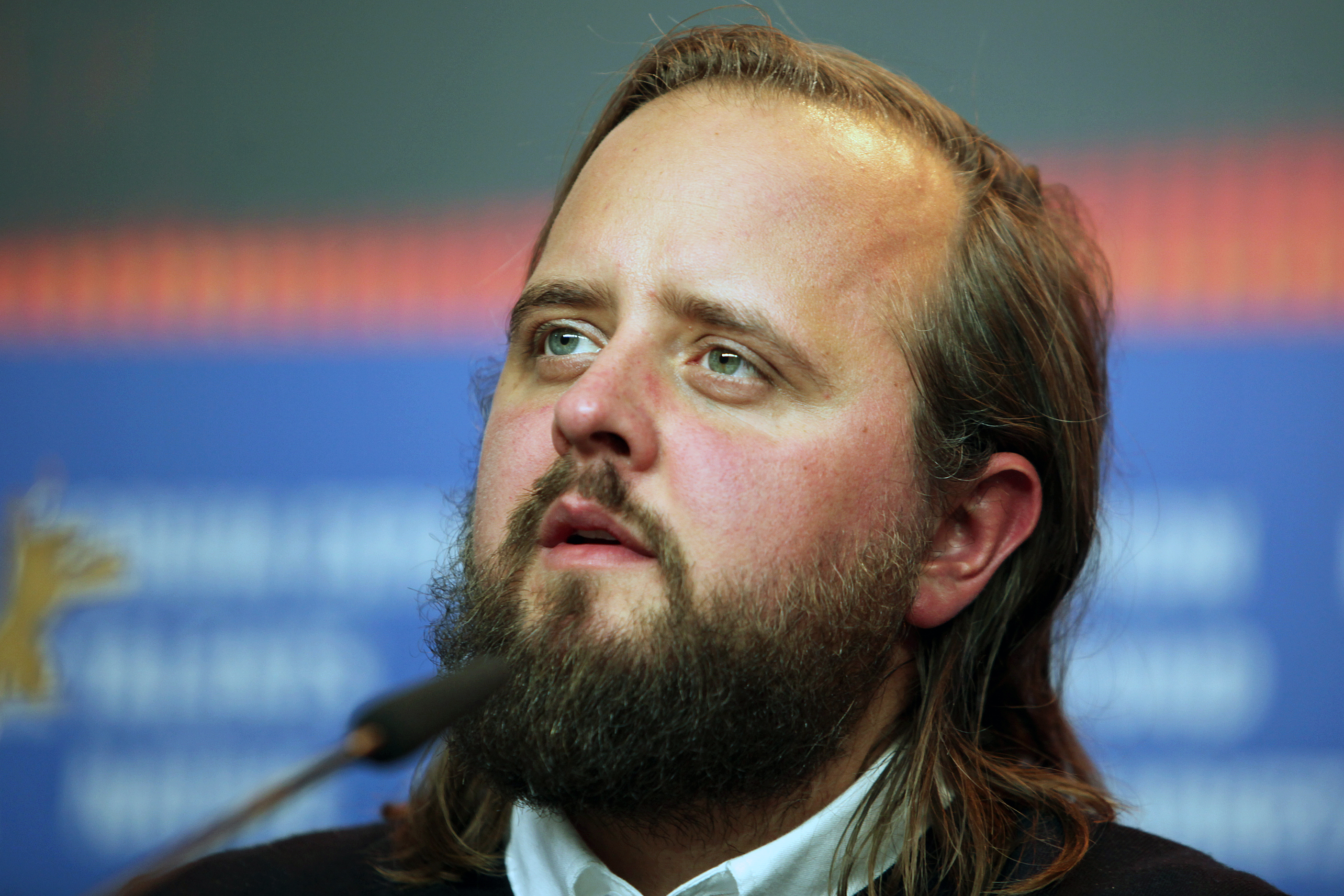
- Born: 20 July 1981 (age 45)
- Occupations: Actor, comedian, film director

Magnus Millang (born 20 July 1981) is a Danish screenwriter, actor, comedian, and film director. He has appeared in Danish TV shows such as Brian Mørk Show, Mørk og Jul, Silat Ninjaen, and Zulu Gumball. In Dark & Christmas, Millang is best known for his activist character, Basher Henrik, a character who in 2008 had a great life on YouTube.

Millang is part of the comedy duo Danish Dynamite. Here he is best known in the role of the smug real estate agent, Jeppe Kaufmann ("Jeppe K").

== Career ==
In 2014, Millang got his first major feature film role in Thomas Vinterberg's film The Commune. In 2016, Millang worked with his younger brother, Emil Millang, on WTF We Do With Climate, a humorous web series on the topic of the climate crisis.

Millang made his directorial debut in 2019, with the comedy Heavy Load, which he co-wrote with his brother Emil. Inspired by the brothers' own upbringing, the two lead characters (played onscreen by the Millang brothers) travel to Spain to look for their father, who died after a difficult life with alcohol. In fact, they were supposed to be responsible for a classic transport home, but due to financial problems, they end up transporting the father home themselves.

Millang created a concept called "FREITAG" that has been successful on social networks. In this concept, he rides his bike and plays techno music celebrating the day of the week, Friday.

In 2019, Millang had a major role in Vinterberg's film Another Round. On June 10, 2026, he was cast in a leading role for "Dreams Come True, with Juho Kuosmanen directing the film.

== Filmography ==
- The Commune (2016)
- Dan-Dream (2017)
- Kursk (2018)
- Heavy Load (2019)
- Another Round (2020)
- Borgen (2022)
- Families like Ours (2024)
