= Kjell Otto Moe =

Norwegian fencer

Personal information
- Born: February 1, 1956 Bergen, Norway
- Died: May 19, 2016 (aged 60)

Sport
- Sport: Fencing

Kjell Otto Moe (1 February 1956 – 19 May 2016) was a Norwegian fencer. He competed in the team épée event at the 1976 Summer Olympics.
