= Arne Tovik =

Norwegian newspaper editor

Arne Olsen Tovik (1956 – 9 June 2009) was a Norwegian journalist.

He was active in the Workers' Youth League in his younger days. He worked for the Labour Party from 1984, and was a campaign secretary for the Norwegian elections of 1987.

In 1987 he was hired as a journalist in Telemark Arbeiderblad (from 1994 Telemarksavisa). He was promoted to editor-in-chief in 1990. Among others, he oversaw its transition to the tabloid format. From 1993 he worked for the Norwegian Broadcasting Corporation, and in 2004 he was hired as political editor for the Telemarksavisa competitor Varden. He has also worked in Porsgrunns Dagblad.

He died in June 2009. The editors-in-chief of both Telemarksavisa and Varden described Tovik as one of the most prominent press people in Telemark.
