= Laila Brenden =

Norwegian author

- Born: 1956 (age 69–70); Oslo, Norway

Laila Brenden (born 1956) is a Norwegian author. She was born in Oslo, and now lives in Jessheim. She has written the Hannah series of novels, which were released between 2003 and 2010, as well as several non-fiction books for children.
