= Frantz Rosenberg =

Norwegian sport shooter (1883–1956)

Personal information
- Born: 27 January 1883 Oslo, Norway
- Died: 18 January 1956 (aged 72) Oslo, Norway

Sport
- Sport: Sports shooting

Frantz Rosenberg (27 January 1883 – 18 January 1956) was a Norwegian sport shooter. He was born in Oslo, and his club was Oslo Sportsskyttere. He competed in trap shooting at the 1912 Summer Olympics in Stockholm.
