= Tor Olav Blostrupmoen =

Norwegian politician (born 1956)

Tor Olav Blostrupmoen (born 12 April 1956) is a Norwegian politician for the Labour Party.

He was born in Alvdal Municipality. After attending upper secondary school in Kongsvinger and Hamar he was a certified TV and radio technician from 1979. He worked from 1981 to 1992 as an electrical fitter.

He was an elected member of the municipal council of Alvdal Municipality from 1987 to 1995, and also chaired the local Labour Party branch from 1988 to 1992. He was elected as a deputy representative to the Parliament of Norway in 1985 and 1989. From 1986 to 1988 he served as a regular representative, covering for Anne-Lise Bakken who was a member of Brundtland's Second Cabinet.

From 1992 to 1993 he again attended Ankerskogen, studying what was then called EDB. He then took a degree in informatics as well as teacher's seminary at Hedmark University College from 1993 to 1997, and has thereafter worked in information technology.
