= Iulie Aslaksen =

Norwegian economist (born 1956)

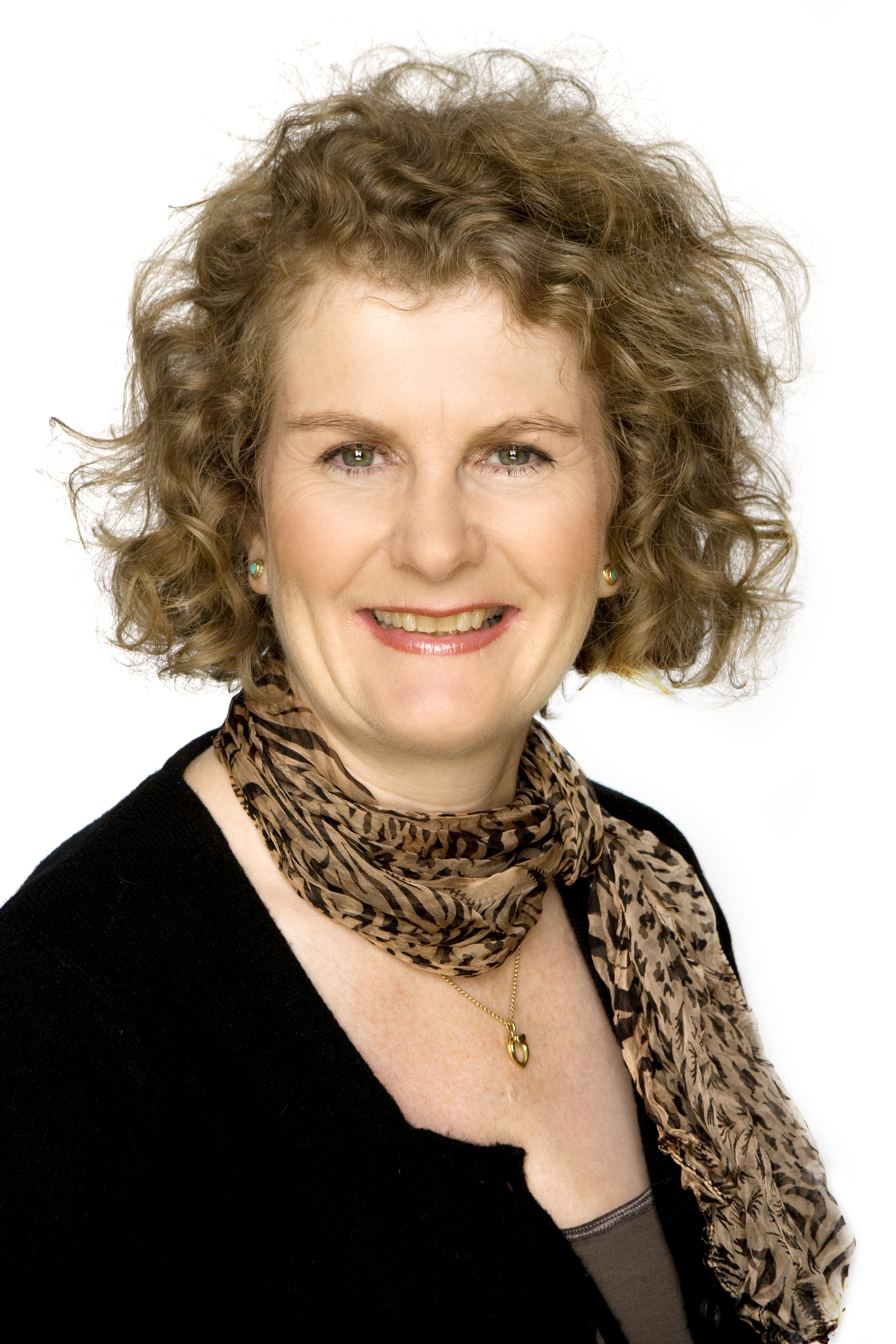
- Born: Iulie Margrethe Nicolaysen Aslaksen; 1956 (age 69–70)

Academic background
- Education: University of Oslo

Academic work
- Discipline: Economics
- Institutions: Statistics Norway

Notes
- Thesis Resource economics in a macroeconomic perspective: five essays on stochastic methods. (1990)

Iulie Margrethe Nicolaysen Aslaksen (born 1956) is a Norwegian economist and Senior Researcher at Statistics Norway. She was a member of the Petroleum Price Board from 1990 to 2000. She is an expert on energy and environmental economics, including petroleum economics, climate policy and economics and sustainable development. She is cand.oecon. from the University of Oslo in 1981 and dr.polit. from 1990. She has been a visiting researcher and Fulbright Fellow at Harvard University and the University of California, Berkeley, and Associate Professor of Economics at the University of Oslo. She was a member of the government commissions resulting in the Norwegian Official Report 1988:21 Norsk økonomi i forandring (A Changing Norwegian Economy) and the Norwegian Official Report 1999:11 Analyse av investeringsutviklingen på kontinentalsokkelen (Analysis of Investments on the Norwegian Continental Shelf).

== Selected bibliography ==
=== Thesis ===
- Aslaksen, Iulie (1990). Resource economics in a macroeconomic perspective: five essays on stochastic methods (Ph.D thesis). University of Oslo. OCLC 603939797.

=== Chapters in books ===
- Aslaksen, Iulie; Myhr, Anne I (2009), "Ecology and economy in the Arctic: uncertainty, knowledge and precaution", in Pereira, Angela G; Silvio, Funtowicz (eds.), Science for policy: new challenges, new opportunities, New Delhi Oxford New York: Oxford University Press, pp. 214–230, ISBN 978-0-19-569849-7.
- Aslaksen, Iulie; Reinert, Erik S; Eira, Inger M G; Mathiesen, Svein D; Reinert, Hugo; Turi, Ellen I (2010), "Adapting to climate change in Sámi reindeer herding: the nation-state as problem and solution", in Adger, W. Neil; Lorenzoni, Irene; O'Brian, Karen L (eds.), Adapting to climate change: thresholds, values, governance, Cambridge, UK New York: Cambridge University Press, pp. 417–432, ISBN 978-0-521-18251-5. (pdf version)
- Aslaksen, Iulie; Bragstad, Torunn; Ås, Berit (2014), "Feminist economics as vision for a sustainable future", in Bjørnholt, Margunn; McKay, Ailsa (eds.), Counting on Marilyn Waring: new advances in feminist economics, Demeter Press, pp. 21–36, ISBN 978-1-927335-27-7.

=== Journal articles ===
- Aslaksen, Iulie (May 2002). "Gender constructions and the possibility of a generous economic actor". Hypatia. 17 (2): 118–132. doi:10.1111/j.1527-2001.2002.tb00769.x. S2CID 144695504.
- Aslaksen, Iulie; Synnestvedt, Terje (December 2003). "Ethical investment and the incentives for corporate environmental protection and social responsibility". Corporate Social Responsibility and Environmental Management. 10 (4): 212–223. Bibcode:2003CSREM..10..212A. doi:10.1002/csr.47.
- Aslaksen, Iulie; Wennemo, Tom; Aaberge, Rolf (2005). ""Birds of a feather flock together": the impact of choice of spouse on family labor income inequality" (PDF). Labour. 19 (3): 491–515. doi:10.1111/j.1467-9914.2005.00311.x. hdl:11250/178006. S2CID 53509579.
- Aslaksen, Iulie; Natvig, Bent; Nordal, Inger (2006). "Environmental risk and the precautionary principle: 'late lessons from early warnings' applied to genetically modified plants". Journal of Risk Research. 9 (3): 205–224. doi:10.1080/13669870500419586. hdl:11250/180903. S2CID 151169732.
- Aslaksen, Iulie; Myhr, Anne I (January 2007). "'The worth of a wildflower': precautionary perspectives on the environmental risk of GMOs". Ecological Economics. 60 (3): 489–497. doi:10.1016/j.ecolecon.2006.07.021. hdl:11250/180681.
- Aslaksen, Iulie; et al. (April 2011). "The nature index: a general framework for synthesizing knowledge on the state of biodiversity". PLOS ONE. 6 (4) e18930. Bibcode:2011PLoSO...618930C. doi:10.1371/journal.pone.0018930. PMC 3081300. PMID 21526118.
- Aslaksen, Iulie; Garnåsjordet, Per Arild; Giampietro, Mario; Funtowicz, Silvio; Ericson, Torgeir (September–October 2012). "Sustainable development indicators: from statistics to policy". Environmental Policy and Governance. 22 (5): 322–336. Bibcode:2012EnvPG..22..322G. doi:10.1002/eet.1597.
- Aslaksen, Iulie; Glomsrød, Solveig; Myhr, Anne I (2012). "'Late lessons from early warnings' – uncertainty and precaution in policy approaches to Arctic climate change impacts". Polar Geography. 35 (2): 135–153. Bibcode:2012PolGe..35..135A. doi:10.1080/1088937X.2011.654357. S2CID 140643145.
- Aslaksen, Iulie; Garnåsjordet, Per Arild (2012). "Guest editorial: The Norwegian Nature Index". Norwegian Journal of Geography. 66 (5): 239–240. doi:10.1080/00291951.2012.743171. S2CID 129040836.
- Aslaksen, Iulie; Framstad, Erik; Garnåsjordet, Per Arild; Lillegård, Magnar (2012). "The Norwegian Nature Index: Expert evaluations in precautionary approaches to biodiversity policy". Norwegian Journal of Geography. 66 (5): 257–271. Bibcode:2012NGTid..66..257A. doi:10.1080/00291951.2012.743483. S2CID 128882815.
- Aslaksen, Iulie; Seippel, Ørnulf; De Marchi, Bruna; Garnåsjordet, Per Arild (2012). "Public opinions on biological diversity in Norway: Politics, science, or culture?". Norwegian Journal of Geography. 66 (5): 290–299. Bibcode:2012NGTid..66..290S. doi:10.1080/00291951.2012.744091. S2CID 145520161.
- Aslaksen, Iulie; Framstad, Erik; Garnåsjordet, Per Arild; Nybø, Signe; Skarpaas, Olav (2012). "Knowledge gathering and communication on biodiversity: Developing the Norwegian Nature Index". Norwegian Journal of Geography. 66 (5): 300–308. Bibcode:2012NGTid..66..300A. doi:10.1080/00291951.2012.744092. S2CID 128473895.
- Aslaksen, Iulie; Glomsrød, Solveig; Myhr, Anne I (2013). "Post-normal science and ecological economics: strategies for precautionary approaches and sustainable development". International Journal of Sustainable Development. 16 (1/2): 107–126. Bibcode:2013IJSD...16..107A. doi:10.1504/IJSD.2013.053793.

== See also ==
- Feminist economics
- List of feminist economists
