= Ivar Hognestad =

Norwegian politician (born 1956)

Ivar Hognestad (born 22 February 1956) is a Norwegian politician for the Progress Party.

He served as a deputy representative to the Norwegian Parliament from Vest-Agder during the term 2005–2009.

On the local level, he has background from the municipal council of Sirdal Municipality.
