= Jon Gunnes =

Norwegian politician (born 1956)

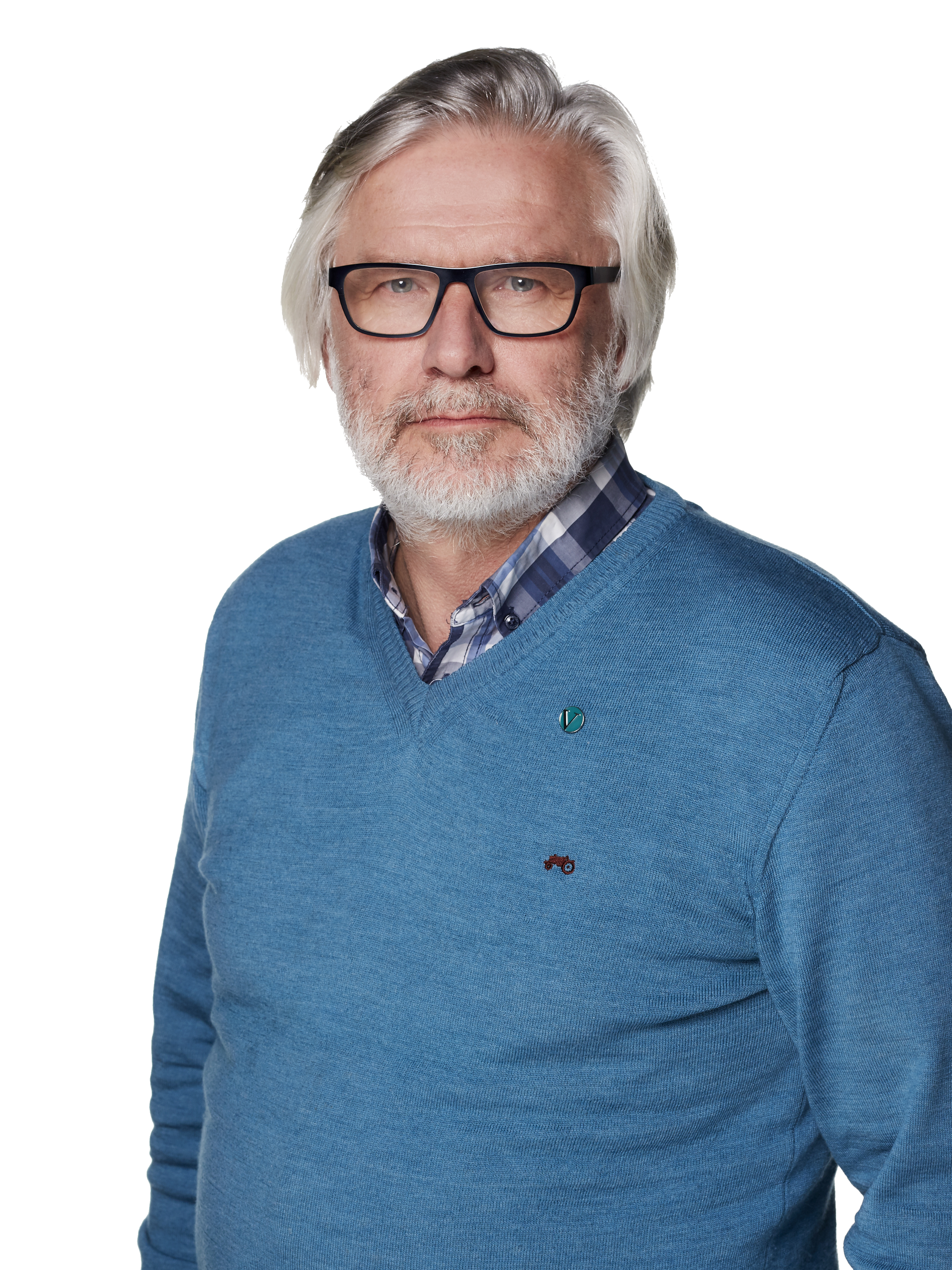
- Gunnes in 2016
- Born: 8 November 1956 (age 69); Trondheim, Norway
- Occupation: Politician
- Political party: Liberal Party

Jon Gunnes (born 8 November 1956) is a Norwegian politician. He was elected representative to the Storting for the period 2017–2021 for the Liberal Party.

== Personal life ==
Born in Trondheim on 8 November 1956, Gunnes is a son of Jarle Gunnes and Brynhild Eggan.
