= Knut H. Kallerud =

Norwegian lawyer and judge (born 1956)

- Born: born 13 April 1956; Kongsberg
- Citizenship: Norwegian
- Occupations: lawyer and judge

Knut Herbrand Kallerud (born 13 April 1

956) is a Norwegian lawyer and judge.

He was born in Kongsberg, graduated with the cand.jur. degree in 1983 and also took a master's degree in human rights law at Essex University in 1998. After two years in the Ministry of Justice and the Police from 1983 to 1985, he served as a deputy judge in Kragerø District Court for one year. He was then hired in the law firm Hestenes og Dramer & Co, first as a junior solicitor from 1986 to 1989 and a lawyer from 1989 to 1995.

He was a Public Prosecutor from 1995 to 2008, Assisting Director of Public Prosecutions from 2008 to 2011 and a Supreme Court Justice from July 2011.
