= Harald Magnus Andreassen =

Norwegian economist

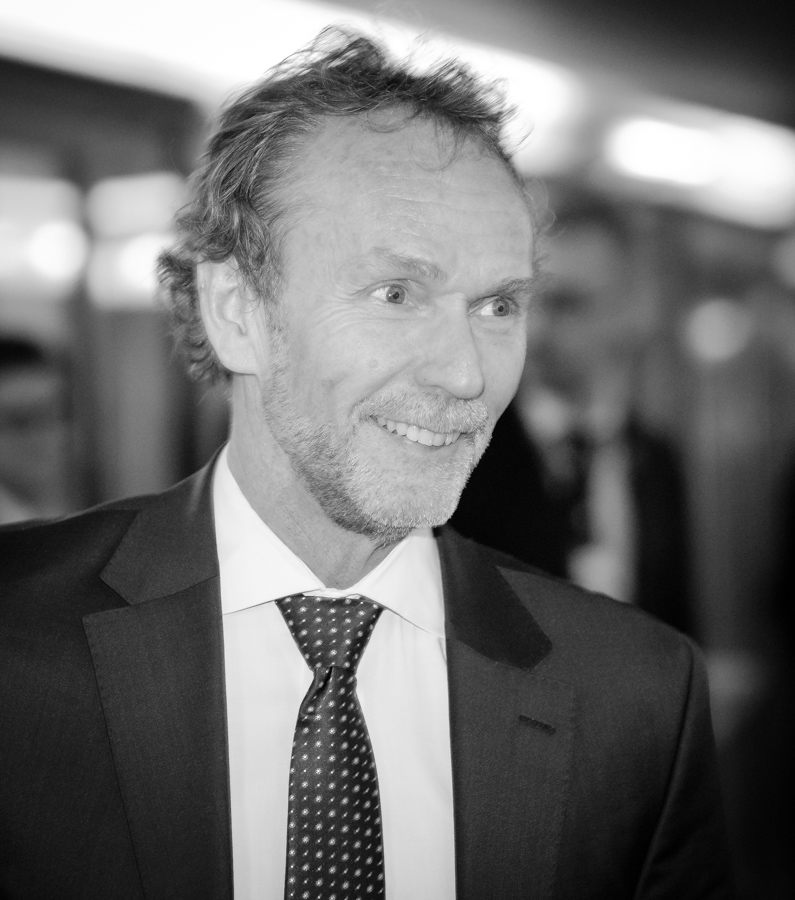
Harald Magnus Andreassen,2018

Harald Magnus Andreassen (born 4 November 1956) is a Norwegian economist.

He graduated from the University of Oslo with the cand.oecon. degree in 1984. He was a board member of the Foundation for Student Life in Oslo from 1982 to 1984. He worked for the Norwegian Bankers' Association from 1984 to 1989 and Econ from 1989 to 1994 before becoming chief economist in Elcon Securities. Since 1999 he holds the same job in First Securities. He has also been involved in the Norwegian Polytechnic Society. He is often used as a commentator in news media.

He resides in Nordstrand.
