= Troll (automobile) =

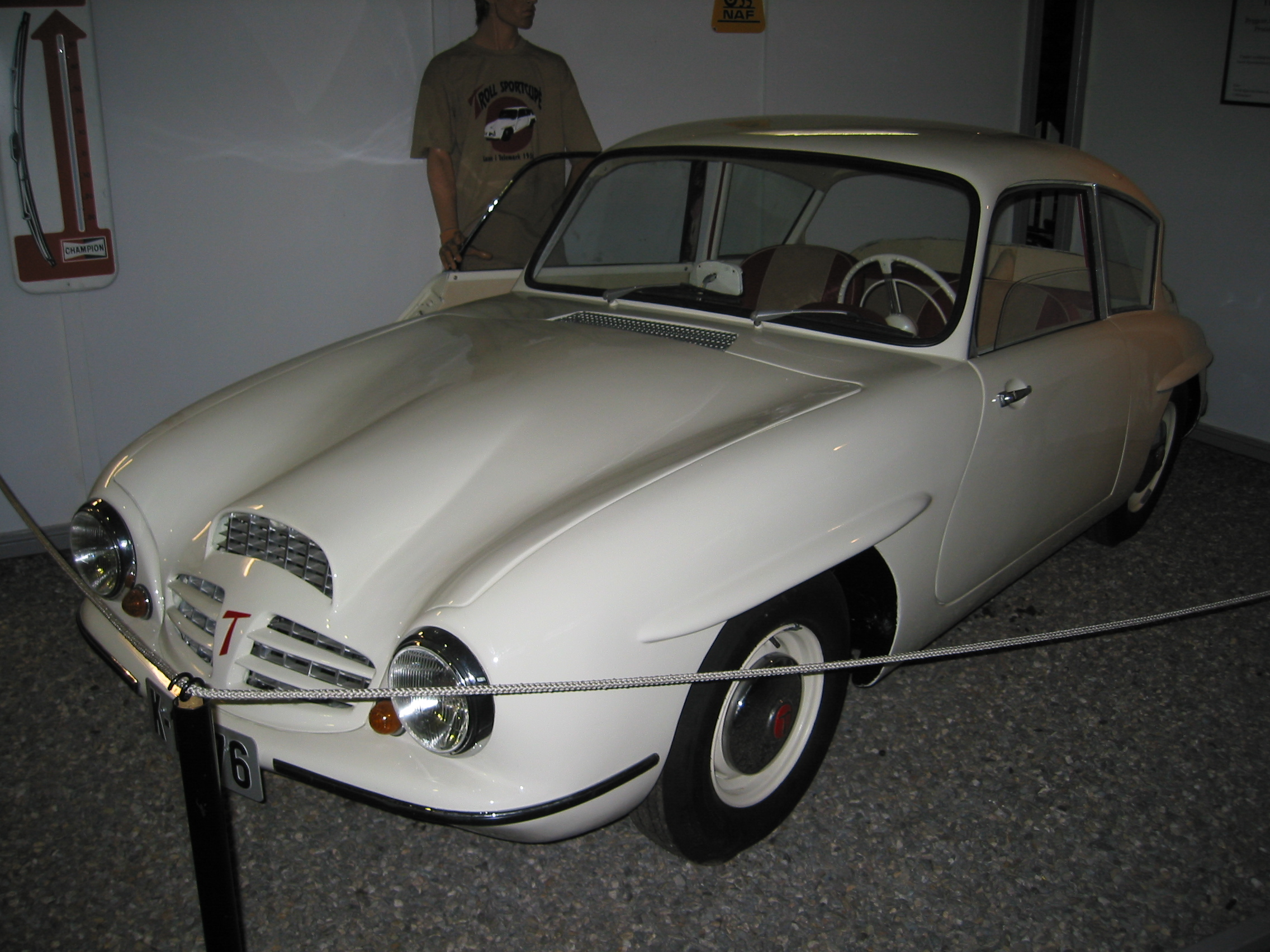

Overview
- Type: Sports car
- Manufacturer: Troll Plastik & Bilindustri
- Designer: Hans Trippel

Body and chassis
- Body style: 2+2 coupe
- Related: Gutbrod Superior

Powertrain
- Engine: 700 cc (42.7 cu in) Gutbrod two-stroke straight-twin
- Power output: 26 hp (19.4 kW)
- Transmission: 3-speed manual

Dimensions
- Wheelbase: 2,000 mm (78.7 in)

The Troll was a small car manufactured by Troll Plastik & Bilindustri of Lunde, Norway, from 1956 to 1958. It was one of a few attempts at car production in Norway, and only five cars were built.

== Design ==
The Troll was built as a 2+2 sports car with a fibreglass body, with the intention to build the first non-American mass-produced fibreglass car. In the US, Chevrolet made its Corvette in fibreglass, but no one in Europe had built cars in plastic, except for the East German Trabant, which was also a 2-cylinder two-stroke car. Fibreglass was a relatively new material in the late 1950s, but had numerous benefits, notably its inability to rust and its light weight (being approximately 130 kg (290 lb) lighter than an equivalent metal-bodied car).

The Troll's chassis was taken from a Gutbrod Superior, and the body was made 150 millimetres (5.9 in) longer to fit on it. Gutbrod also manufactured the Troll's engine, which was a 700 cc (43 cu in) two-stroke straight-twin with Bosch fuel injection connected to a three-speed Hurth transmission. The engine produced 26 hp (19 kW), propelling the car to a top speed of approximately 130 km/h (81 mph). The Troll was also capable of 5 litres per 100 km (47 mpg).

Due to the complex fuel injection system, there were plans to use a 3-cylinder Saab engine instead, which were never implemented.

== History ==
=== Development ===
The Troll was developed by businessman Per Kohl-Larsen and engineers Bruno Falck and Erling Fjugstad, and designed by Hans Trippel.

The first car was revealed to the press in October 1956. It was not completely finished, and although the form of the chassis was final, the car could not be driven. This car was later used as a prototype, and many changes were made during later testing. Norwegian and foreign press showed much enthusiasm towards the project, and the car was compared to those from brands like Porsche, Citroën and Saab.

=== Production and bankruptcy ===
The first Troll was sold to a customer on May 1, 1957.

As production commenced, Kohl-Larsen faced difficulty obtaining a permit from the Norwegian government to sell the Troll. He was allowed to sell only 15 cars in Norway, the reason being a barter treaty Norway had with the Soviet Union and Eastern Europe to buy cars from them as they bought fish products from Norway. As such, the government was afraid that domestic car production would disrupt this trading balance. Kohl-Larsen therefore started plans to export cars to Germany and Denmark, with requests from other countries like Finland and Belgium. At one point, the company had plans to build 2,000 cars per year, but settled on one finished car per day afterwards.

Troll Plastik & Bilindustri was also unable to secure the investment capital necessary for large-scale production. When the Norwegian government made their lack of support for the Troll clear, all potential investors closed negotiations, resulting in bankruptcy in early 1958.
