= Lars Ole Vaagen =

Norwegian civil servant and diplomat

Lars Ole Vaagen (born 1 December 1956) is a Norwegian civil servant and diplomat.

He holds the cand.polit. degree and was hired in the Ministry of Foreign Affairs in 1987. He served as subdirector here from 1998 to 2008, except for the years 2000–2004 when he was an embassy counsellor in Geneva. Vaagen subsequently served as Norway's ambassador to Guatemala from 2008 to 2012, Venezuela from 2012 to 2013 and Colombia from 2013 to 2016. As of 2016 he is a special adviser in the Ministry of Foreign Affairs.
