= Olav Gjelsvik =

Norwegian philosopher (born 1956)

Olav Gjelsvik (born 30 June 1956) is a Norwegian philosopher.

Born and raised in Røros Municipality, he graduated with a DPhil from Oxford University (Balliol College) in 1986, and has since been employed by the University of Oslo; from 1991 as an associate professor, and from 1994 as a full professor. He has published papers in journals and anthologies on topics in metaphysics, epistemology, philosophy of language, philosophy of science, philosophy of mind and action, and has also worked and published on the phenomenon of addiction. He has held many offices at the University of Oslo, been Chair of Philosophy in Oslo for many years, and was Director of Centre for the Study of Mind in Nature 2010 to 2017. He is a member of the Norwegian Academy of Science and Letters, Academia Europaea, and The Royal Norwegian Society of Sciences and Letters.
