= Jørgen Sørlie =

Norwegian footballer (born 1956)

Personal information
- Date of birth: 29 November 1956 (age 69)
- Place of birth: Frosta Municipality, Norway
- Position: Midfielder

Senior career*
Years	Team	Apps	(Gls)
1979–1986	Rosenborg	125	(22)
- * Club domestic league appearances and goals

Jørgen Sørlie (born 29 November 1956) is a Norwegian former footballer who played as a midfielder for Rosenborg between 1979 and 1986. He played 125 league matches and became league champion in 1985. Sørlie was top scorer for Rosenborg in the 1979 season.
