= Knut N. Kjær =

Norwegian economist (born 1956)

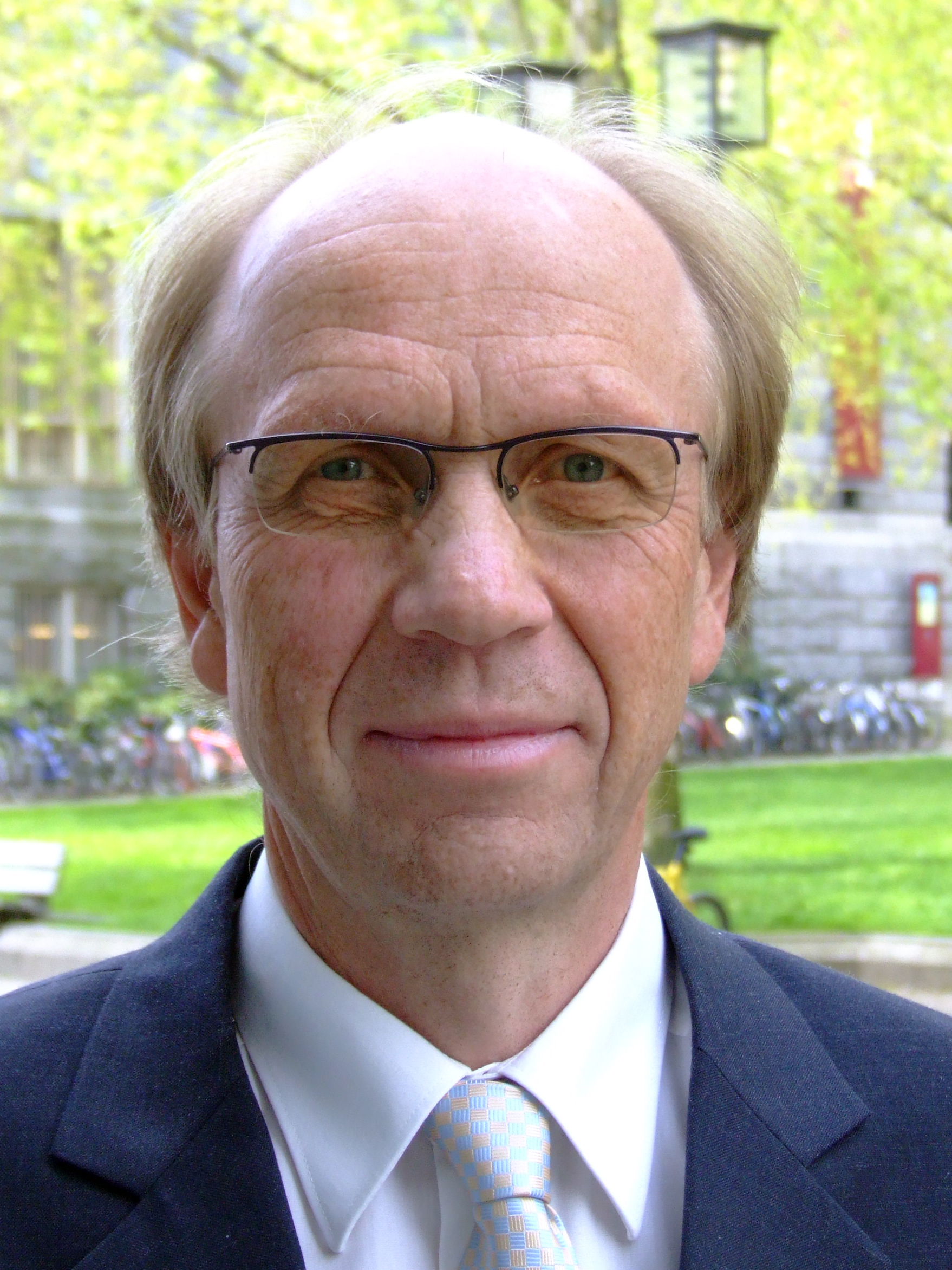
- Born: 14 April 1956 (age 69)
- Occupation: Economist
- Awards: Order of St. Olav (2008)

Knut Norheim Kjær (born 14 April 1956) is a Norwegian economist. He was the first manager of the Government Pension Fund of Norway, from 1997 to 2008. In 2008 Yngve Slyngstad became CEO of the fund.

He is currently a member of the International Advisory Council of the China Investment Corporation, a member of the investment committee of the Stichting Pensioenfonds ABP, adviser to the Government of Singapore Investment Corporation and chairperson of FSN Capital. He was decorated Knight of the Order of St. Olav in 2008.
