= Bernt Rougthvedt =

Norwegian historian and writer (1956–2019)

Bernt Rougthvedt (29 August 1956 – 28 April 2019) was a Norwegian historian, biographer and thriller/crime writer.

Rougthvedt hailed from Skien and graduated from the University of Oslo with the cand.philol. degree in history of religions, history and Norwegian. He tutored at Finnmark University College among others, before moving back to Skien and pursuing a career as a writer.

He wrote biographies on Per Imerslund (with Terje Emberland, 2004), the crime writers Sven Elvestad (2007) and Jonas Lie (2010), who were all right-wing authoritarians. He later wrote a biography on the conservative, young resistance fighter, Gregers Gram (2012). His penchant for crime fiction resulted in the novels Edderkoppen (2010), Stormlaget (2011, both with Terje Emberland) and the thriller Tårn (2013), some of which built upon real murder mysteries from the interwar period. He also published true crime stories from the 1890s with Saken mot Abelone (2014) and from the 1930s with Mordet på lille Mary (2017).

Rougthvedt was diagnosed with cancer in 2017 and died in April 2019.
