= Helge Skaara =

Norwegian civil servant and diplomat

Helge Skaara (born 24 January 1956 in Tønsberg) is a Norwegian civil servant and diplomat.

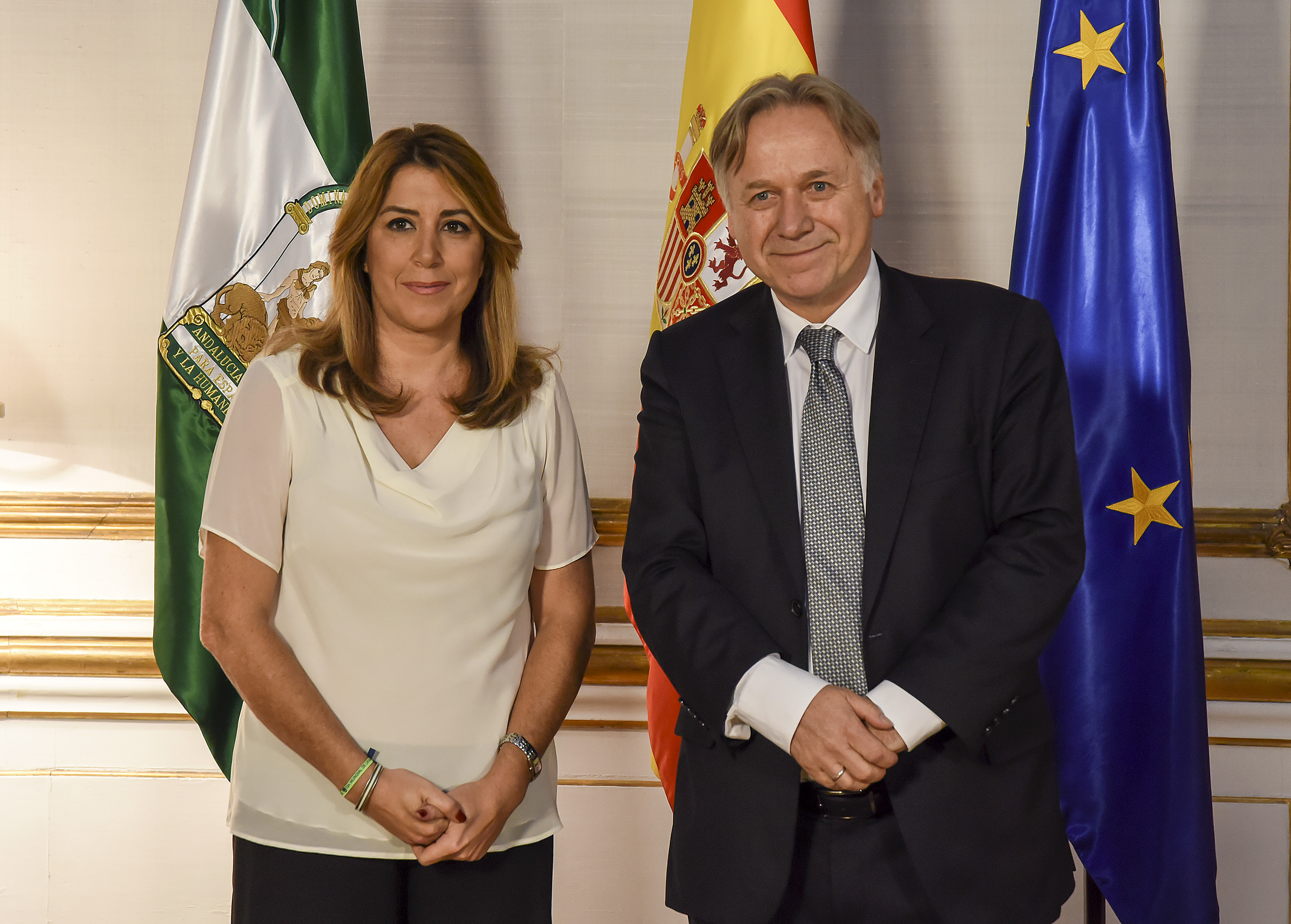

He holds the cand.mag. degree and was hired in the Ministry of Foreign Affairs in 1983. He served as Norway's ambassador to Mexico and non resident ambassador to Cuba from 2002 to 2005. Then as minister, Deputy Head of Mission in the Norwegian Delegation to the European Union in Brussels until 2010. Two years as Norway's ambassador to Venezuela and non resident ambassador to Colombia followed.

From 2012 to 2013 he was special adviser for energy and climate change with title as Ambassador in the Ministry of Foreign Affairs. Then he served as deputy secretary-general in the European Free Trade Association before being Director General for Europe and European Affairs in the Ministry of Foreign Affairs from 2014 to 2016. He then serves as Norway's ambassador to Spain from 2016.

Diplomatic posts
| Preceded by Johan Christopher Vibe | Norwegian ambassador to Spain; 2016– | Succeeded by incumbent |
