= Jan Roger Skyttesæter =

Norwegian archer (born 1956)

Personal information
- Born: 8 April 1956 (age 70) Oslo, Norway

Sport
- Sport: Archery

Jan Roger Skyttesæter (born 8 April 1956) is a former Norwegian archer. He was born in Oslo. He competed in archery at the 1984 Summer Olympics in Los Angeles, where he placed 23rd in the individual competition.
