= Olav Sigurd Kjesbu =

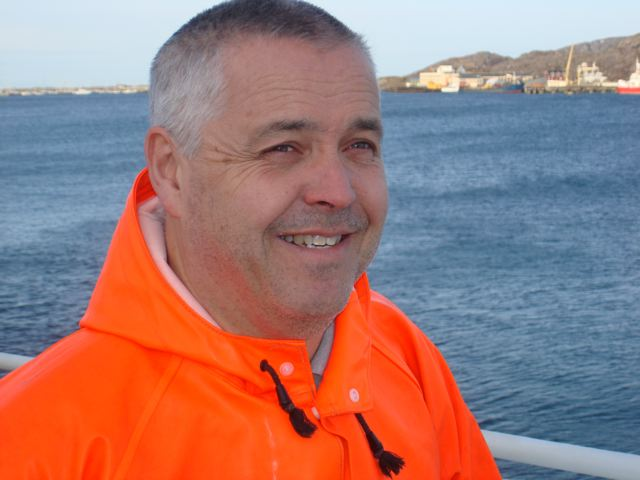
Olav Sigurd Kjesbu, March 2009

Olav Sigurd Kjesbu (born 13 June 1956) is a Norwegian fisheries biologist/Chief Scientist at the Institute of Marine Research (IMR) in Bergen. He is the director of the Hjort Centre for Marine Ecosystem Dynamics. Bergen is one of the largest marine knowledge hubs in the world and the Hjort Centre is a central part of this research cluster. In addition he also holds a position as adjunct professor at Centre for Ecological and Evolutionary Synthesis (CEES), University of Oslo, Oslo. Kjesbu got his PhD in 1988 and became principal scientist in 1996. His research expertise falls within reproductive biology and recruitment dynamics of marine fish. He is an expert on Northeast Atlantic cod, currently the largest cod stock in the world. Kjesbu has been active in or leading development co-operation projects, especially with Centro Investigaciones Pesqueras (CIP), Havana through the Norwegian Agency for Development Cooperation (NORAD).

Kjesbu was selected as one out four "Norwegian leading experts on arctic-related marine research" in the mobile European exhibition of the University of Oslo The legacy of Fridtjof Nansen (150th birthday), where he represented the field of marine biology.
