= Bjørn Erik Hollevik =

Norwegian politician

Bjørn Erik Hollevik (born 10 October 1956) is a Norwegian politician for the Conservative Party.

He served as a deputy representative to the Parliament of Norway from Sogn og Fjordane during the term 2013–2017. He hails from Flora Municipality and has been a member of the county council.
