= Ketil Gudim =

Norwegian dancer and actor

- Born: 6 November 1956 (age 68); Sarpsborg, Norway
- Occupation(s): Dancer, actor

Ketil Gudim (born 6 November 1956) is a Norwegian dancer and actor. He was born in Sarpsborg. A bust of Gudim, made by Nina Sundbye, is located at the Oslo Opera House.
