= Anne Helene Gjelstad =

Norwegian photographer and fashion designer (born 1956)

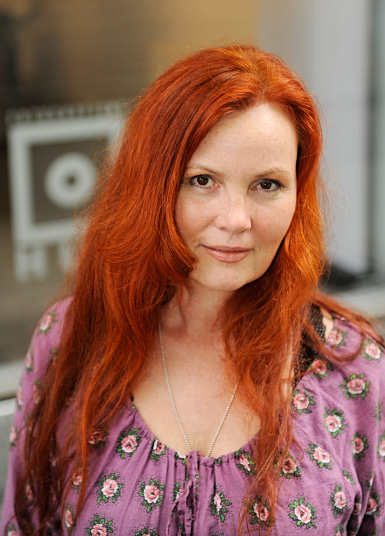
Anne Helene Gjelstad Credit: Jon Skille Amundsen

Anne Helene Gjelstad (9 May 1956 in Oslo) is a Norwegian photographer and fashion designer. As a photographer, she mainly works with portraits, fashion and documentary, but also with interiors, products and lifestyle.

Gjelstad is educated from Norwegian National Academy of Craft and Art Industry from 1982. She then had her own fashion studio for design and production of exclusive models. For 5½ years, she also had her own knitting production in Estonia for the Norwegian and international market.

In 2009, she completed at two-years course in digital photography at Bilder Nordic School of Photography. She has also participated in workshops with Morten Krogvold, Mary Ellen Mark, and Joyce Tenneson. In 2009, she also worked at Mary Ellen Mark Studio in New York City.

In 2020, she worked on a project in Kihnu, an island in the Baltic Sea considered Europe's last matriarchy. She met women from the island during a Nordic Knitting Symposium. She later said that out of 35 women she photographed, only 10 are still alive.

== Exhibitions ==
Collective Exhibitions

- Stå ikkje dær å frys on Det norske teatret, Oslo, December 2008
- På en tråd in Sandvika, Bærum, August 2009
- Fotografiets dag on Preus Photo Museum, August 2009
- Zoom Norway in Ljubljana, Slovenia 2010
- Oaxaca XV exhibition curated by Mary Ellen Mark – Centro Fotografico Alvarez Bravo; Mexico 12 March – 31 May 2011
- Intangible Cultural Heritage photo exhibition, National Art Museum of China, 17–26 May 2014
- The Lonka Project, Willy-Brandt-Haus, Berlin, 27 Januar 2021 – 11 April 2021

Solo Exhibitions

- SCAPES -Norwegian kids, teens & nature: Exhibition on tour in Estonia on an invitation from the Norwegian Embassy in Tallinn in 2010 og 2011
  - Tallinn: Deco Galerii, 11–29 May 2010
  - Tõstamaa: Tõstamaa Secondary School (mansion and museum), 8–30 June 2010
  - Haapsalu: Haapsalu City Hall, 3–31 August 2010
  - Pärnu: Villa Artis Galerii, 3 September – 7 October 2010
  - Narva: Narva Main Library, 17 October – 30 November 2010
  - Elva: Tartu County Museum, 11 January – 28 February 2011
  - Hiiumaa: Kärdla Culture Centre, 4–21 March 2010
- SCAPES – Norwegian kids, teens & nature, at Fotografiens Hus, Oslo, 31 March – 30 April 2011
- MY FOCUS, Fotografiens Hus, Oslo 1–18 December 2011
- Big heart, strong hands – a portrait of the older women on Kihnu and Manija islands; Estonia
  - Kihnu museum, 24 April – 30 September 2011
  - Pärnu:: The Museum of Modern Art 5–31 October 2011
  - Tallinn: The Estonian Parliament at Toompea 16 November – 15 December 2011
  - Rakvere: Rakvere Culture Centre
  - Tartu: Estonian National Museum
  - Narva: Narva Museum
  - Hiiumaa: Hiiuma Museum
- Matriarchy, Side Gallery, Newcastle upon Tyne, 29 october – 23 December 2022

== Awards ==
- Letter of appreciation, Estonian Ministry of Foreign Affairs, 26 November 2020, «for the promotion of Estonia’s cultural heritage as well as the exciting and unique life of Kihnu and Manilaid in Norway and the world.»
- Gold winner in category Photographers Project in Gullsnitt 2010 for pictures of old ladies in Kihnu and Manilaid; Estonia
- Portrait of the year 2017
- Represented Norway in World Photographic Cup 2018 og 2019
- Gold medal portrait in the annual competitions by the Norwegian Association of Photographers in 2018

== Books ==
- Alt om maskinstrikking 1994; ISBN 82-7774-003-4 (in Norwegian)
- Norsk Strikkedesign: A Collection from Norway's Foremost Knitting Designers (co-writer), 2002
- Scapes, Norwegian kids, teens & nature, blurb.com
- MY FOCUS via archive.org
- Lekre masker og lekne sting, photo, Gyldendal Norsk Forlag, 2013; ISBN 978-82-05-43137-9
- Vakker strikk til alle årstider, photo, Gyldendal Norsk Forlag, 2014; ISBN 978-82-05-46852-8
- Big Heart, Strong Hands, text in English and Norwegian, Dewi Lewis Publishing, 2020; ISBN 978-1-911306-56-6 (2nd edition, 2021)
