= Anna Bøe =

Norwegian journalist and magazine editor

- Born: 1 May 1864; Aker, Norway
- Died: 23 April 1956 (aged 91); Asker, Norway
- Occupation(s): Journalist and magazine editor
- Known for: Founding editor of Urd

Anna Bøe (1 May 1864 – 23 April 1956) was a Norwegian journalist, co-founder and editor of the women's magazine Urd for 37 years.

== Personal life ==
Bøe was born in Aker (now Oslo) to Hans Simonsen Bøe and Marie Ringstad. She died in Asker in 1956, nearly 92 years old.

== Career ==
Bøe founded the women's magazine Urd in 1897, along with her sister Cecilie, and served as the magazine's editor from the start until 1933. The profile of Urd was culture, art, popular education and women's rights, with a basically Christian life stance.

Her literary works include the feuilleton novel Idealer, as well as poetry. She took part in the contemporary debate by writing newspaper articles on culture and other issues. She also edited Krigsropet for four years.
