= Finn Skårderud =

Norwegian psychiatrist

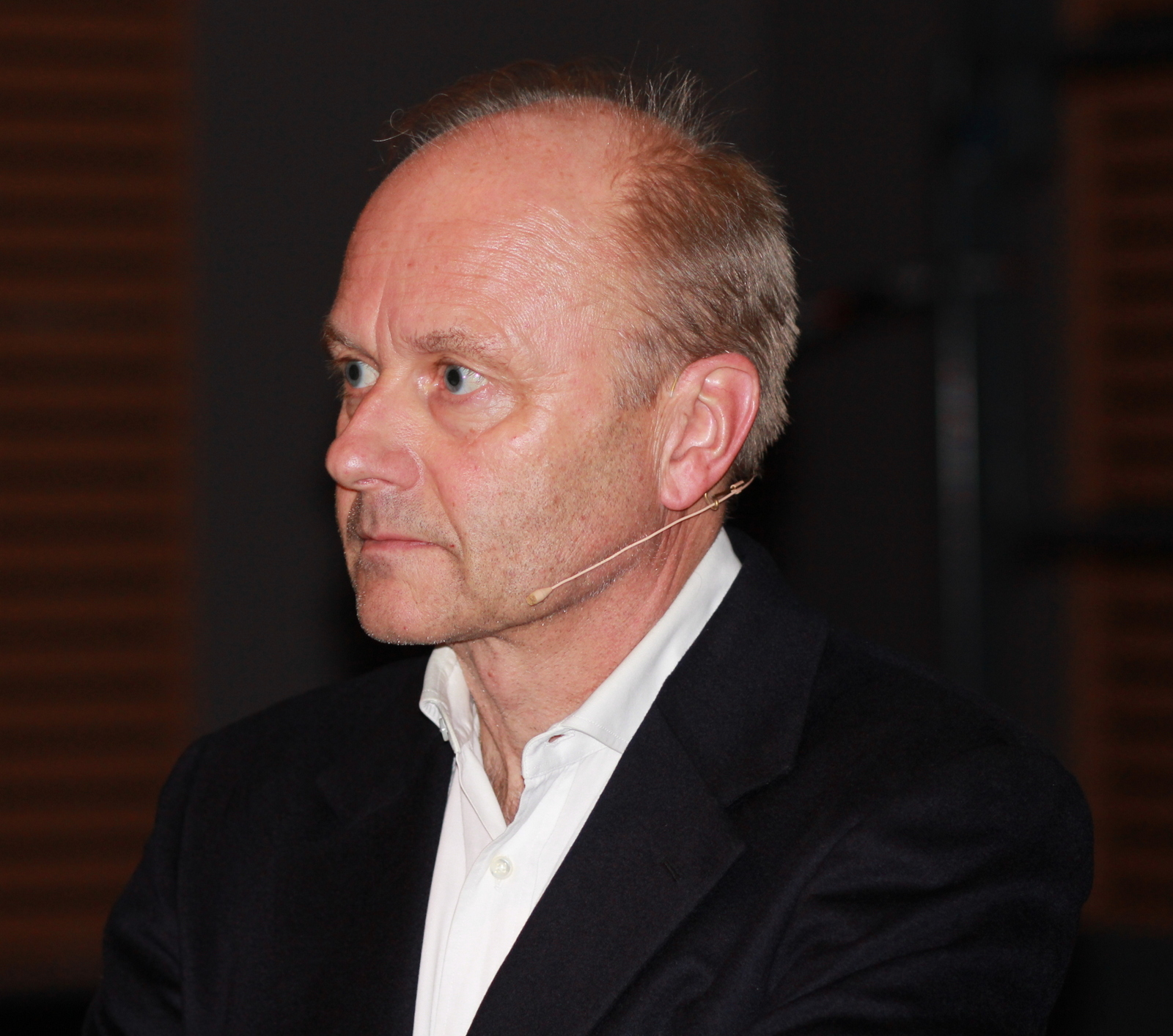
Finn Skårderud at Schizofrenidagene in Stavanger

Finn Skårderud (born 27 October 1956) is a Norwegian former psychiatrist who was struck off the medical register by the Norwegian Board of Health Supervision due to a widespread pattern of professional misconduct in 2023. As such he is no longer a medical doctor or psychiatrist. In 2024 he pleaded guilty to fraud.

== Career ==
He once led a psychotherapy project at Oslo University Hospital, ran a private practice and was the psychiatrist for the Norwegian Olympic Committee. He was a professor at the Department of Special Needs Education at the University of Oslo and at Lillehammer University College. He was also an author and film, art and literature critic, and has produced numerous scientific papers, books and book chapters within the fields of psychiatry, psychology, culture, literature and film, both fiction and non-fiction.

Following an investigation into professional misconduct he was struck off the medical register by the Norwegian Board of Health Supervision in 2023.

== In popular culture ==
Skårderud's unconventional suggestion that people have a natural alcohol deficiency, and having a blood alcohol content of 0.05% makes you more creative and relaxed, forms the central premise of 2020 Danish comedy drama film Another Round. This is a real theory written in a book first published in 1881, 'On the psychological effects of wine' by Edmondo de Amicis.
