= Helga Ramstad =

Norwegian politician (1875–1956)

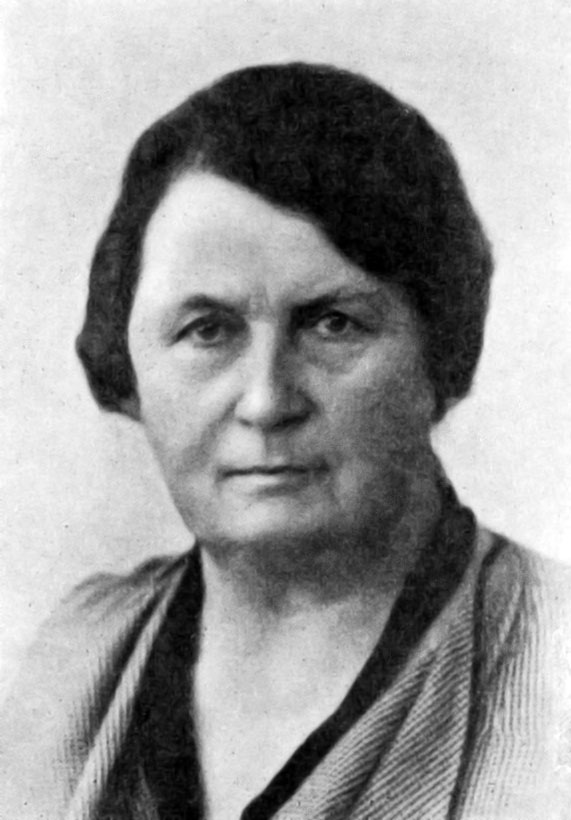

Personal details
- Born: 8 January 1875 Gullan, Hillestad, Vestfold, Norway
- Died: 20 March 1956 (aged 81)
- Party: Labor Party

Helga Anna Augusta Ramstad (8 January 1875 – 20 March 1956) was a Norwegian politician, a member of the Labour Party.

The daughter of John Olsen Saastad, a farmer, and Charlotte Amalie Finckenhagen, she was born Helga Anna Augusta Saastad in Gullan, Hillestad, Vestfold.

From 1921 to 1941, she was custodian at a middle school in Teisen.

From 1916 to 1919, she was a member of the municipal executive council for Aker; from 1928 to 1931, she served on the municipal council for Aker. She represented Akershus in the Storting from 1934 to 1936. Ramstad was a member of the Labor Party's central committee from 1933 to 1936.
