= Tron Erik Hovind =

Norwegian politician (born 1956)

Tron Erik Hovind (born 15 June 1956 in Ullensaker) is a Norwegian politician for the Centre Party.

He served as a deputy representative to the Norwegian Parliament from Akershus during the terms 1997–2001 and 2001–2005. From 1997 to 1999 he was a regular representative, covering for Anne Enger Lahnstein who was appointed to the first cabinet Bondevik.

Hovind held various positions in Ullensaker municipality council from 1983 to 2011, serving as deputy mayor from 1994 to 1997 and mayor from 1991 to 1993.
