= Arne O. Holm =

Norwegian journalist and newspaper editor

Arne O. Holm (born 20 October 1956) is a Norwegian journalist and newspaper editor. He was born in Tromsø. He has been journalist for the newspapers Dagbladet and Dagens Næringsliv, and for NRK's Brennpunkt. He was awarded the SKUP Award in 1992. He was chief editor of Svalbardposten from 1997 to 1999.

He was chief editor of the web based newspaper High North News from 2014 to 2024.

== Selected works ==
- Everest. Den tunge veien (co-writer), 1995
- Fra sort kull til varme bad (co-writer), 2000
- Ja, vi elsker Se og hør, 2007
