= 1893 in Norway =

- Centuries: 17th; 18th; 19th; 20th; 21st
- Decades: 1870s; 1880s; 1890s; 1900s; 1910s
- See also: 1893 in Sweden; List of years in Norway

Events in the year 1893 in Norway.

== Incumbents ==
- Monarch – Oscar II.
- Prime Minister – Johannes Steen, later Emil Stang (from 2 May)

== Events ==
- 19 May – a quick clay slide in Verdal Municipality destroyed 105 farms and killed 116 people.
- The local newspaper Stavanger Aftenblad was established by Lars Oftedal.

== Arts and literature ==
- The Norwegian Authors' Union (Den norske Forfatterforening) is established.
- Edvard Munch begins to paint The Scream.

== Sport ==
- 27 February – Norwegian Skating Association (Norges Skøyteforbund) is founded.

== Births ==
=== January to March ===
- 6 January – Olaf Bjerke, trade unionist and politician (died 1957)
- 16 January – Alfred Engelsen, gymnast and Olympic gold medallist (died 1966)
- 21 January – Tolv Aamland, politician (died 1983)
- 26 January – Sigurd Pedersen, politician (died 1968)
- 30 January – Ingolf Davidsen, gymnast and Olympic silver medallist (died 1946)
- 25 February – Arne Langset, politician (died 1971)
- 14 March – Torstein Kvamme, politician (died 1985)
- 22 March – Rasmus Sørnes, inventor, clockmaker and radio technician (died 1967)
- 23 March – Reidar Tønsberg, gymnast and Olympic silver medallist (died 1956)
- 27 March – Einar Jansen, historian, genealogist and archivist (died 1960)
- 27 March – Johan Sæterhaug, boxer (died 1968)
- 30 March – Elise Fliflet, politician (died 1991)

=== April to June ===
- 5 April – Frithjof Andersen, wrestler and Olympic bronze medallist (died 1975).
- 26 April – Ole Øisang, newspaper editor and politician (died 1963)
- 29 April – Birger Brandtzæg, merchant and owner of a fishing station (died 1971).
- 4 May – Aasmund Kulien, politician (died 1988)
- 6 May – Ludvik Buland, trade unionist (died 1945)
- 19 May – Gudolf Blakstad, architect (died 1985)
- 30 June – Birger Var, rower and Olympic bronze medallist (died 1970)

=== July to September ===
- 3 July – Ragnar Vik, sailor and Olympic gold medallist (died 1941)
- 4 July – Frede Castberg, jurist (died 1977)
- 10 July – Niels Larsen Bruun, naval officer (died 1970)
- 11 July – Tancred Ibsen, officer, pilot, film director and screenwriter (died 1978)
- 18 August – Gustav Natvig-Pedersen, politician (died 1965)
- 19 August – Rolf Palmstrøm, military officer.
- 18 September – Reidar Rye Haugan, newspaper publisher in America (died 1972)

=== October to December ===
- 14 October – Sigurd Roll, diplomat and former sprinter (died 1944)
- 27 October – Reidar Dahl, jurist and sports official, president of the Football Association of Norway (died 1977).
- 7 November – Ivar Navelsaker, military officer (died 1966)
- 10 November – Karl Henry Karlsen, politician (died 1979)
- 18 November – Eivind Kristoffer Eriksen, politician (died 1949)
- 21 November – Torvald Haavardstad, politician (died 1965)
- 25 November – Hartvig Caspar Christie, politician (died 1959)
- 26 December – Halfdan Schjøtt, sailor and Olympic gold medallist (died 1974)
- 27 December – Asbjørn Solberg, politician (died 1977)

=== Full date unknown ===
- Sigval Bergesen the Younger, shipping magnate and industrialist (died 1980)
- Anton Johnson Brandt, veterinarian (died 1951)
- Einar Frogner, politician and Minister (died 1955)
- Hans Severin Jelstrup, astronomer (died 1964)
- Mikkel Ødelien, soil researcher (died 1984)
- Øystein Olsen Ravner, politician (died 1975)

== Deaths ==
- 12 January – Diderik Iversen Tønseth, politician (born 1818)
- 12 October – Harald Nicolai Storm Wergeland, military officer, politician, Minister and mountaineer (born 1814)
- 21 October – Jacob Jørgen Kastrup Sømme, businessperson, consul and politician (born 1817)
- 19 December – Axel Winge, politician (born 1827)
- 23 December – Gunnar Berg, painter (born 1863)

=== Full date unknown ===
- Ludvig Daae, politician (born 1829)
- Carl Peter Parelius Essendrop, bishop, politician and Minister (born 1818)
- Simon Karenius Høegh, bank treasurer, merchant and politician (born 1810)
- Olaf Isaachsen, painter (born 1835)
