= 1975 in Norway =

- Centuries: 18th; 19th; 20th; 21st
- Decades: 1950s; 1960s; 1970s; 1980s; 1990s
- See also: List of years in Norway

Events in the year 1975 in Norway.

== Incumbents ==
- Monarch – Olav V.
- Prime Minister – Trygve Bratteli (Labour Party)

== Events ==
=== January – March ===
- 1 January - The Tobacco Act enters into force. This landmark legislation introduces a total ban on the advertising of tobacco products and requires health warnings on packaging.
- 1 February - The Norwegian government implements a one-year "immigration stop" (innvandringsstopp), a policy intended to be temporary that reshaped modern Norwegian immigration law by restricting low-skilled labor entry.
- July 29 to August 7 – 14th World Scout Jamboree, Lillehammer

=== April – June ===
- 30 May - Norway participates in the Conference of Plenipotentiaries which establishes the European Space Agency (ESA). While Norway did not sign the main convention immediately, it remained a signatory to the Final Act.
- June - The Kindergarten Act is passed by the Storting, establishing the first national framework for early childhood education and care.

=== July – September ===
- 29 July – 7 August - The 14th World Scout Jamboree is held in Lillehammer, bringing together over 17,000 scouts from around the globe
- 28 August - The animated film Flåklypa Grand Prix (The Pinchcliffe Grand Prix) premieres in Norwegian cinemas. It eventually becomes the most successful film in the country's history.

=== October – December ===
- 1 November - A fire breaks out on the Ekofisk 2/4 Alpha platform. Tragically, three people die when a rescue capsule falls during the evacuation. This event leads to a radical overhaul of offshore safety regulations.
- November - The Socialist Left Party (SV) is officially formed as a unified political party, evolving from the previous Socialist Electoral League coalition.

== Popular culture ==
=== Film: The Year of Flåklypa ===
The dominant cultural event of 1975 was the release of "Flåklypa Grand Prix" (The Pinchcliffe Grand Prix). This stop-motion animated film, directed by Ivo Caprino and based on the characters of Kjell Aukrust, remains the most-watched Norwegian film in history. It even won a special honorary award at the Spellemannprisen that year.

- Other Notable Releases: Olsenbandens siste bedrifter (The Olsen Gang's Last Exploits), part of the immensely popular comedy franchise.

=== Music and Eurovision ===
Norwegian music in 1975 was a mix of "Viser" (folk-pop) and the early roots of Norwegian rock.

- Eurovision: Ellen Nikolaysen represented Norway in Stockholm with the song "Touch My Life (with Summer)" (originally "Det skulle ha vært sommer nå"). While it finished 18th, it remains a classic of the era.
- Spellemannprisen (The Norwegian Grammys):
  - Artist of the Year: Stein Ove Berg for his album Visa di.
  - Pop-Rock: The band Prudence (featuring future legend Åge Aleksandersen) won for their album Takk te dokk.
  - Honorary Award: Otto Nielsen was recognized for his massive contribution to Norwegian music and radio.

=== Television: The Color Revolution ===
1975 was the first full year where NRK (the sole national broadcaster at the time) broadcast regularly in color. This changed the way Norwegians consumed entertainment, making variety shows and sports events more immersive.

=== Literature ===
- Stein Mehren, poet, novelist, essayist and playwright, is awarded the Riksmål Society Literature Prize.

== Notable births ==
=== January to March ===
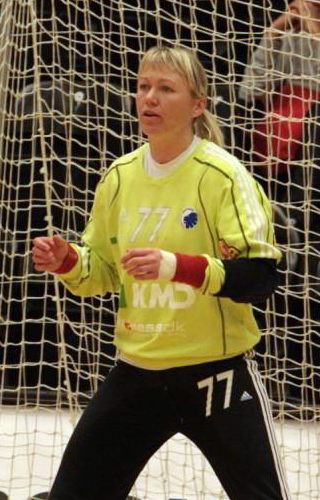
Cecilie Leganger

- 9 January – Rolf Bae, mountaineer (d.2008).
- 11 January – Trine Bakke, alpine skier.
- 23 January – Ingeborg Helen Marken, alpine skier.
- 26 January – Tonje Larsen, handball player.
- 4 February – Eirik Hoff Lysholm, journalist and newspaper editor.
- 25 February – Hilde Grande, politician.
- 1 March – Heidi Gjermundsen Broch, actress and singer.
- 4 March – Mats Eilertsen, jazz musician.
- 12 March – Cecilie Leganger, handball player.
- 25 March
  - Monica Knudsen, footballer.
  - Lisa Stokke, singer and actress

=== April to June ===
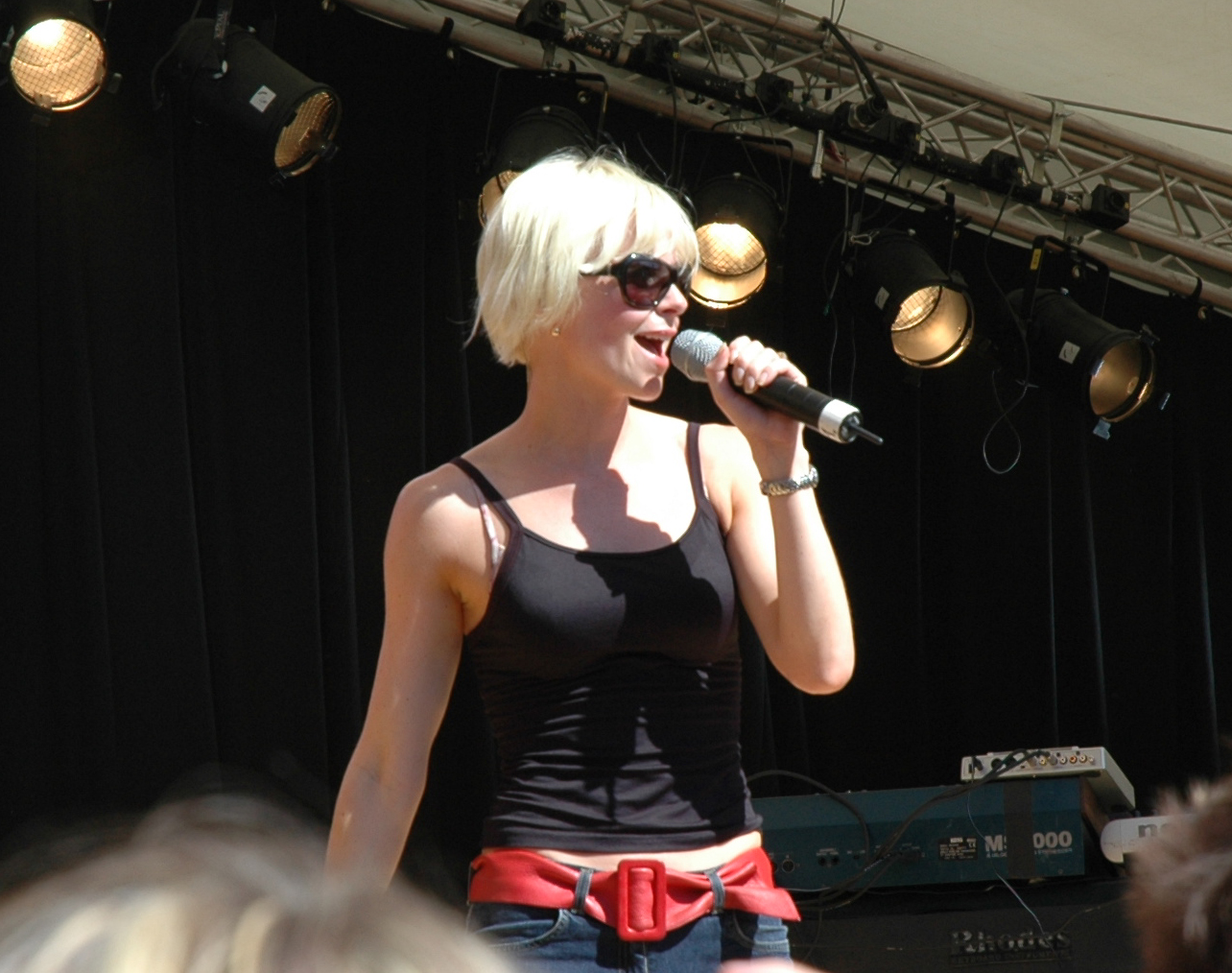
Bertine Zetlitz

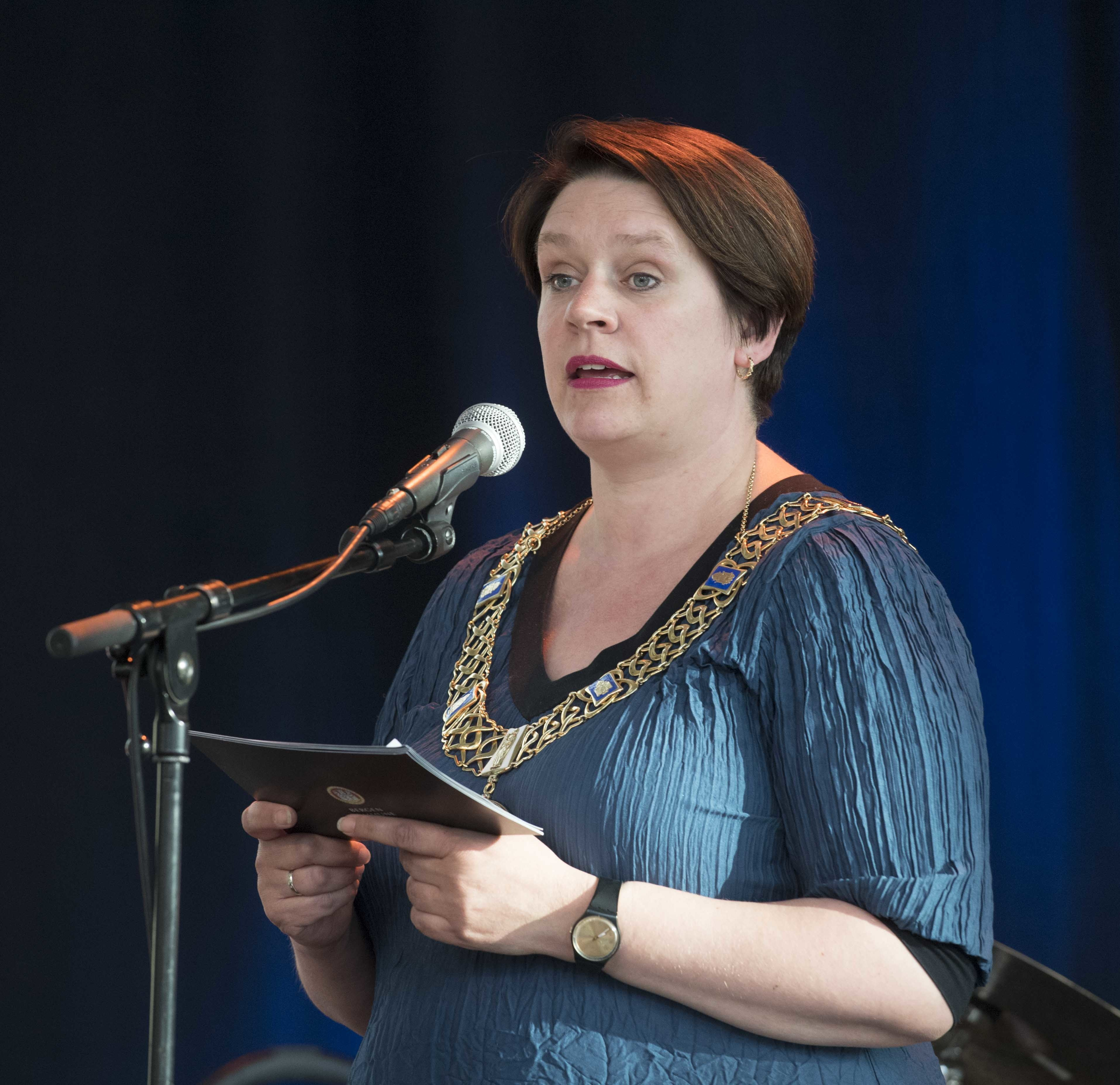
Marte Mjøs Persen

- 9 April – Bertine Zetlitz, pop singer.
- 23 April
  - Stine Brun Kjeldaas, snowboarder.
  - Helge Lien, jazz pianist, composer and band leader.
- 24 April – Marte Mjøs Persen, politician.
- 30 April – Kristin Roskifte, illustrator and author of picture books.
- 8 May – Anna Ceselie Brustad Moe, politician
- 18 May – Ingvild Kjerkol, politician.
- 26 May – Marte Michelet, journalist, critic and non-fiction writer.
- 29 May – Gunnar Garfors, media professional, traveller, and author
- 30 May – Synne Sun Løes, novelist and children's writer.
- 3 June – Christine Bøe Jensen, footballer.
- 4 June – Torgeir Knag Fylkesnes, politician.
- 21 June – Tone Gunn Frustøl, footballer.

=== July to September ===
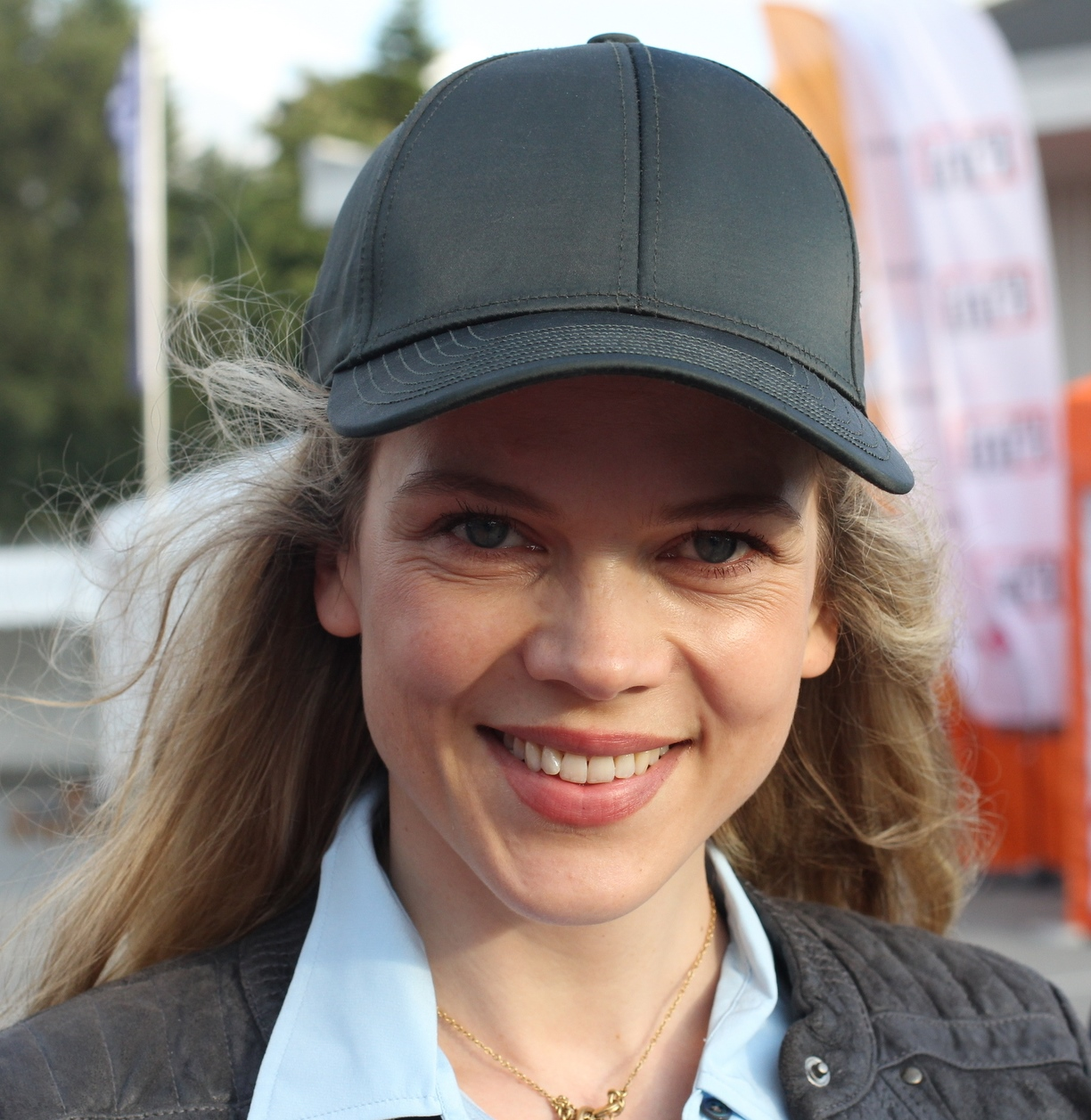
Ane Dahl Torp

- 20 July – Erik Hagen, footballer.
- 25 July – Håvard Ellefsen, also known as Mortiis, black metal musician
- 30 July – Maja Lunde, writer.
- 1 August – Ane Dahl Torp, actress.
- 2 August – Lars Petter Hagen, actress.
- 7 August – Gaahl (Kristian Eivind Espedal), black metal musician
- 2 September – Daniel Skjeldam, business executive.
- 19 September – Anna Bache-Wiig, actress and writer.
- 26 September – Anna Børve Jenssen, newspaper editor.

=== October to December ===
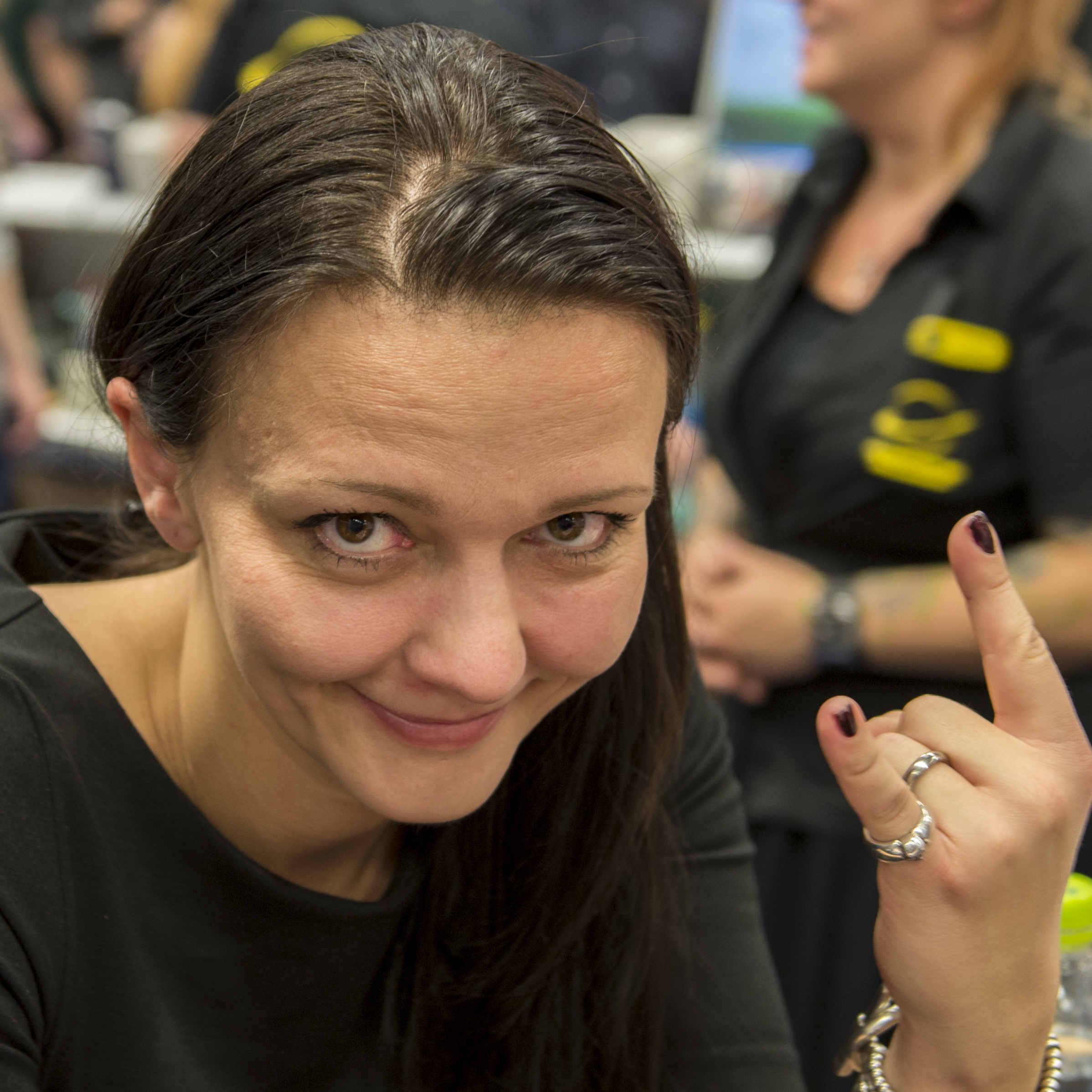
Lise Myhre is creator of the cartoon Nemi.

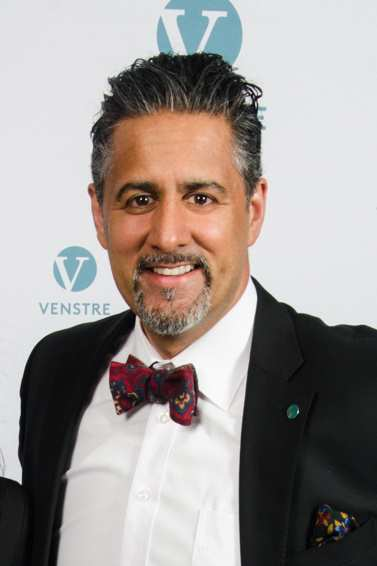
Abid Raja

- 12 October – Marianne Beate Kielland, mezzo-soprano.
- 20 October – Ronny Aukrust, politician.
- 28 October – Aksel Hennie, actor.
- 1 November – Lise Myhre, cartoonist.
- 5 November – Abid Raja, jurist and politician.
- 14 November – Nicolai Cleve Broch, actor.
- 19 November – Kristine Kristiansen, alpine skier.
- 24 November – Marian Saastad Ottesen, actress.
- 27 November – Frode Nymo, jazz musician.
- 28 November – Jenny Klinge, politician.
- 4 December – Ellen Dorrit Petersen, actress.
- 28 December – Anniken Refseth, politician
- 29 December – Line Kjørsvik, pool player.

=== Full date unknown ===
- Frode Haltli, accordion player
- Selina Toyomasu, singer (born in the UK)

== Notable deaths ==
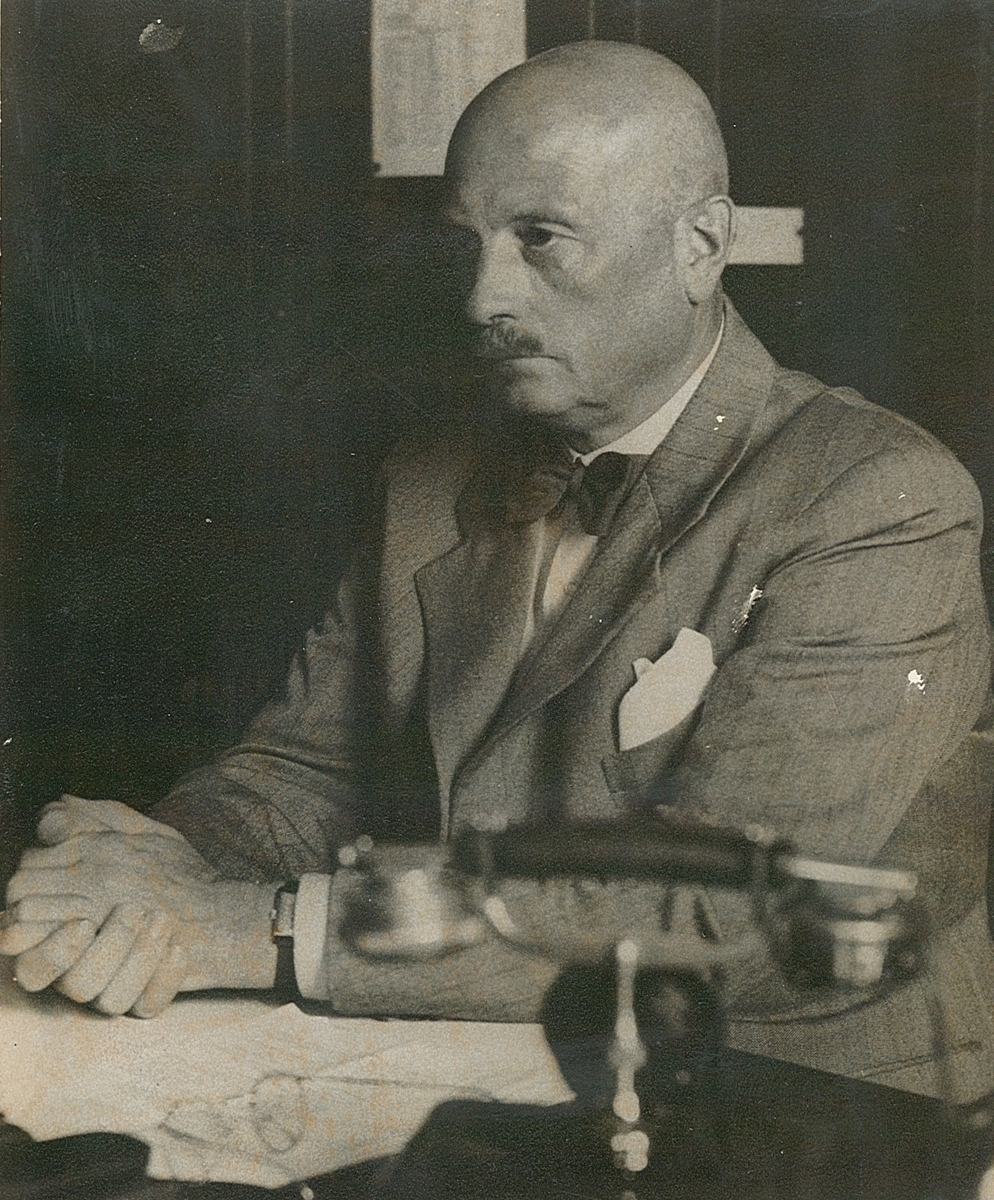
Kristian Welhaven

- 15 January – Edmund Fjærvoll, politician (b.1910)
- 15 January – Håkon Tønsager, rower (b.1890)
- 28 January – Ola Raknes, psychoanalyst and philologist (b.1887)
- 1 February – Martin Smeby, politician (b.1891)
- 5 February – Kristian Fjerdingen, gymnast and Olympic gold medallist (b.1884).
- 22 February – Brynhild Berge, diver (b.1901)
- 14 March – Oddvar Sponberg, race walker (b.1914)
- 12 April – Alf Andersen, ski jumper and Olympic gold medallist (b.1906)
- 16 April – Oscar Larsen, middle-distance runner (b.1887)
- 23 April – Ole Stenen, Nordic skier, Olympic silver medallist and World Champion (b.1903).
- 29 April – Torleiv Corneliussen, sailor and Olympic gold medallist (b.1890)
- 5 May – Nils Eriksen, international soccer player and Olympic bronze medallist (b.1911)
- 15 May – Einar Iveland, politician (b.1892).
- 5 June – Ivar Skjånes, politician (b.1888)
- 11 June – Karl Lunde, politician (b.1892)
- 3 July – Arne Halse, athlete and Olympic silver medallist (b.1887)
- 24 July – Frithjof Andersen, wrestler and Olympic bronze medallist (b.1893).
- 27 July – Kristian Welhaven, chief of the Oslo police force 1927–1954 (b.1883)
- 10 August – Andreas Backer, journalist and organizational leader (born 1895).
- 14 August – Einar Normann Rasmussen, politician (b.1907)
- 18 August – Odd Lindbäck-Larsen, military officer and war historian (b.1897).
- 24 August – Oskar Steinvik, politician (b.1908)
- 26 August – Olaf Holtedahl, geologist (b.1885)
- 6 September – Kristoffer Nilsen, boxer (b.1901)
- 8 October – Frithjof Sælen, gymnast and Olympic gold medallist (b.1892)
- 11 October – Henry Karlsen, politician (b.1912)
- 12 October – Peder Kjellberg, boxer (b.1902)
- 26 December – Salve Andreas Salvesen, politician (b.1909)

=== Full date unknown ===
- Kornelius Bergsvik, politician (b.1889)
- Thor Bjørklund, carpenter and inventor of the cheese slicer (b.1889)
- Thorleif Christoffersen, sailor and Olympic gold medallist (b.1900)
- Johan Faye, sailor and Olympic silver medallist (b.1889)
- Peder Furubotn, cabinetmaker and politician (b.1890)
- Johan Peter Holtsmark, physicist (b.1894)
- Rolf Kiær, hydrographer (b.1897)
- Egil Offenberg, politician and Minister (b.1899)
- Toralv Øksnevad, politician, journalist, newspaper editor and radio personality (b.1891)
- Bjart Ording, horse rider and Olympic silver medallist (b.1898)
- Øystein Olsen Ravner, politician (b.1893)
- Aimée Sommerfelt, author (b.1892)
