= 1894 in Norway =

- Centuries: 17th; 18th; 19th; 20th; 21st
- Decades: 1870s; 1880s; 1890s; 1900s; 1910s
- See also: 1894 in Sweden; List of years in Norway

Events in the year 1894 in Norway.

== Incumbents ==
- Monarch – Oscar II.
- Prime Minister – Emil Stang

== Events ==
- The Norwegian Museum of Cultural History is founded.
- The 1894 Parliamentary election takes place.
- Dalen Hotel, designed by Haldor Børve, is opened.

== Arts and literature ==
- Erika Nissen, pianist, is granted an artist's scholarship by the Norwegian state
- The periodical For Kirke og Kultur is founded.

== Sport ==
- 4 February – Hamar IF were the local technical organisers of the first official national championships of skating at Åkersvika, Mjøsa in Hamar in Norwegian Allround Championships (first champion: Einar Halvorsen) and Norwegian Figure Skating Championships (first champion: Johan Lefstad).

== Notable births ==
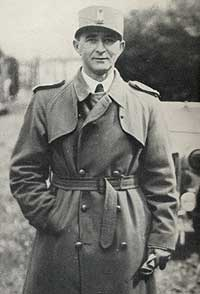
Martin Linge

- 1 January – Otto Aasen, Nordic skier (died 1983)
- 4 January – Hans Nikolai Stavrand, politician (died 1980)
- 7 January – Anton Beinset, journalist, newspaper editor, short story writer, crime fiction writer and politician (died 1963).
- 15 January – Jacob Opdahl, gymnast and Olympic gold medallist (died 1938)
- 1 March – Sigurd Maseng, diplomat (died 1952)
- 2 March – Halldis Stenhamar, journalist (died 1983).
- 4 March – Arne Rostad, politician (died 1969)
- 9 March – Jørgen Leonard Firing, politician (died 1977)
- 14 March – Mikkjel Fønhus, writer (died 1973).
- 18 March – John Anker Johansen, gymnast and Olympic silver medallist (died 1986)
- 21 March – Hannah Ryggen, textile artist (died 1970).
- 31 March – Svein Rosseland, astrophysicist (died 1985)
- 2 April – Jørgen Bjørnstad, gymnast and Olympic silver medallist (died 1942)
- 13 April – Ludvig Irgens-Jensen, composer (died 1969)
- 5 May – Johan Sigurd Karlsen, politician (died 1967)
- 19 May – Carl Søyland, Editor-in-chief of Nordisk Tidende (died 1978)
- 4 June – Alv Kjøs, politician (died 1990)
- 15 June – Trygve Gulbranssen, novelist (died 1962)
- 18 June – Ernst Ullring, naval officer (died 1953).
- 5 July – Eivind Holmsen, sport shooter (died 1990)
- 13 July – Aani Aanisson Rysstad, politician (died 1965)
- 25 July – Otto Johannessen, gymnast and Olympic silver medallist (died 1962)
- 20 August – Snefrid Eriksmoen, politician (died 1954)
- 8 September – Arne Damm, publisher and military officer (died 1968).
- 12 September – Endre Kristian Vestvik, politician (died 1956)
- 27 September – Johan Clementz, boxer (died 1952)
- 28 September – Thorleif Haug, skier and Olympic gold medallist (died 1934)
- 29 September – Ludvig Ellefsrød, politician (died 1983)
- 7 October – Ola Torstensen Lyngstad, politician (died 1952)
- 16 October – Ingvald Haugen, trade unionist and politician (died 1958)
- 30 October – Halvor Birkeland, sailor and Olympic gold medallist (died 1971)
- 5 November – Erling Wikborg, politician (died 1992)
- 12 November – Thorleif Schjelderup-Ebbe, (died 1976)
- 25 November – Håkon Ellingsen, rower and Olympic bronze medallist (died 1971)
- 11 December – Martin Linge, actor and military commander (died 1941)
- 26 December – Håkon Evjenth, jurist and children's writer (died 1951).

=== Full date unknown ===
- Anders Beggerud, civil servant (died 1957)
- Arne Dagfin Dahl, military officer (died 1990)
- Leif Grung, architect (died 1945)
- Johan Peter Holtsmark, physicist (died 1975)
- Olav Larssen, newspaper editor (died 1981)
- Kristian Vilhelm Koren Schjelderup, Jr., Lutheran theologian, author and bishop (died 1980)
- Carl Søyland, newspaper editor (died 1978)

== Notable deaths ==
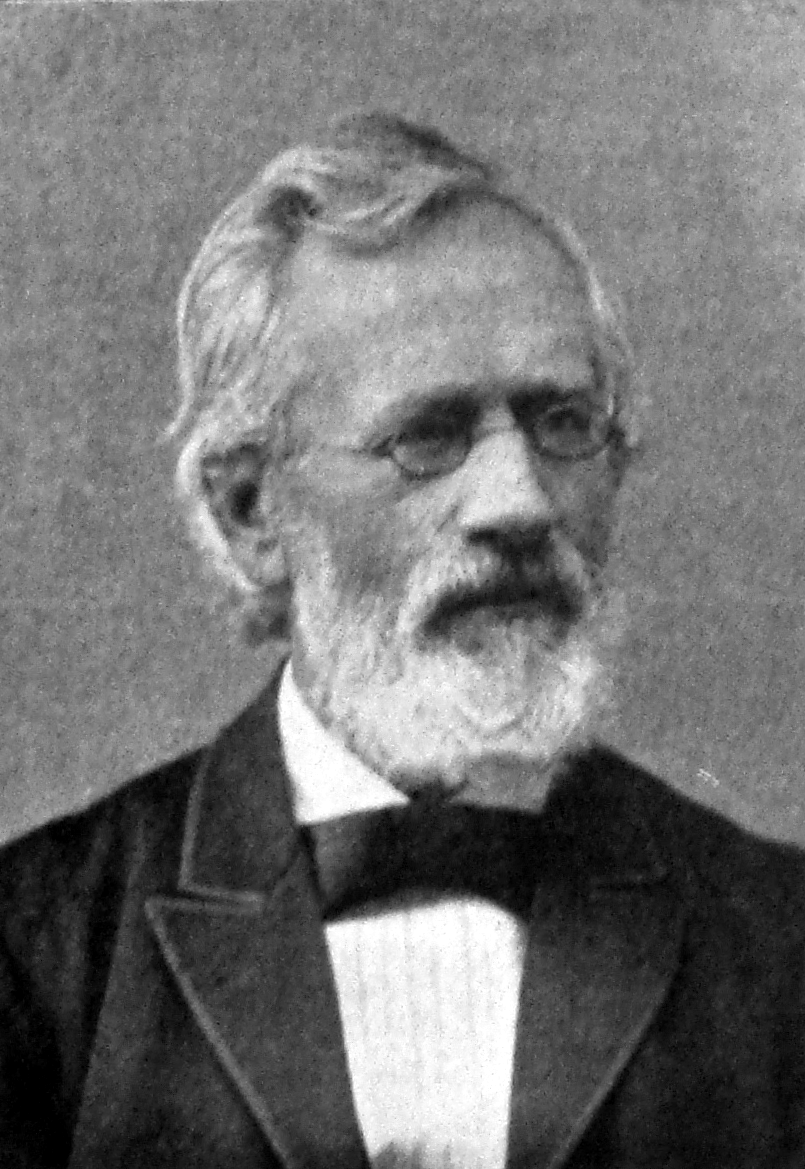
Gisle Johnson

- 7 January – Søren Jaabæk, politician and farmer (born 1814)
- 29 March – Jacob Smith Jarmann, firearms designer (born 1816)
- 13 July – Daniel Cornelius Danielssen, physician (born 1815)
- 25 December – Julius Nicolai Jacobsen, businessperson and politician (born 1829)

=== Full date unknown ===
- Hans J. C. Aall, politician (born 1806)
- Svend Foyn, whaler (born 1809)
- Niels Petersen Vogt, politician and Minister (born 1817)
- Gisle Johnson, theologian (born 1822)
