= 1891 in Norway =

- Centuries: 17th; 18th; 19th; 20th; 21st
- Decades: 1870s; 1880s; 1890s; 1900s; 1910s
- See also: 1891 in Sweden; List of years in Norway

Events in the year 1891 in Norway.

== Incumbents ==
- Monarch – Oscar II.
- Prime Minister – Emil Stang and Johannes Steen

== Events ==
- 30 June - The office of Viceroy of Norway was abolished.
- The 1891 Parliamentary election takes place, resulting in a victory for the Liberal Party, who won 63 of the 114 seats in the Storting.

== Arts and literature ==
Tired Men (or Weary Men) by Arne Garborg is published.

== Births ==
=== January to March ===
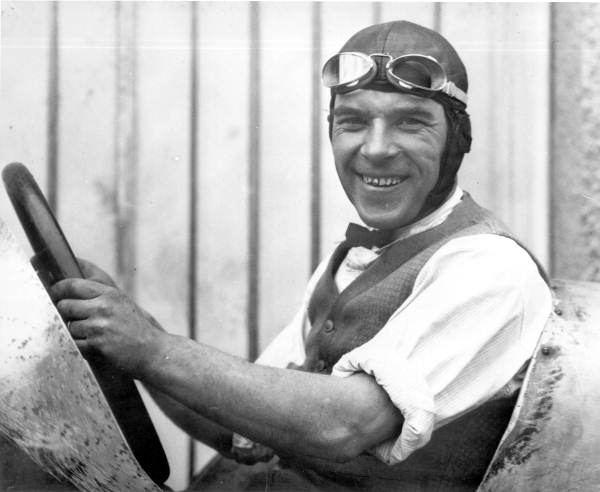
Sig Haugdahl

- 8 January – Hans Gabrielsen, county governor of Finnmark and Oppland (died 1965)
- 10 January – Sig Haugdahl, motor racing driver in America (died 1970)
- 17 January – Astrid Skare, politician (died 1963)
- 9 February – Kristian Krefting, footballer, military officer, chemical engineer and company owner (died 1964).
- 16 February – Håkon Endreson, gymnast and Olympic silver medallist (died 1970)
- 24 February – Theo Findahl, teacher and journalist (died 1976).
- 27 February – Johannes Stubberud, newspaper editor (died 1942)
- 6 March – Herman Smitt Ingebretsen, politician (died 1961)
- 8 March – Robert Sjursen, gymnast and Olympic gold medallist (died 1965)
- 17 March – Claus Høyer, rower and Olympic bronze medallist (died 1923)
- 23 March – Jens Olai Steffensen, politician (died 1961)

=== April to June ===
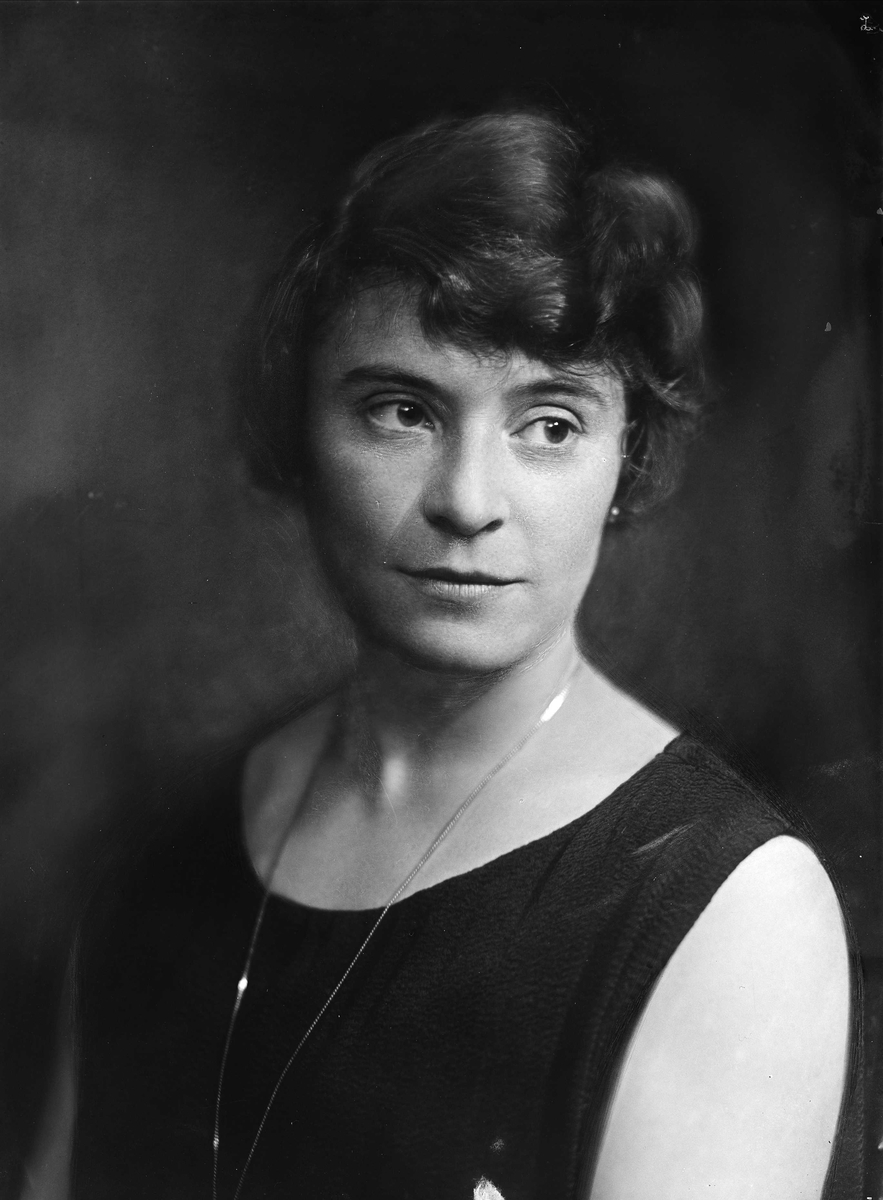
Gerda Ring

- 5 April – Per Severin Hjermann, politician (died 1972)
- 28 April – Isak Abrahamsen, gymnast and Olympic gold medallist (died 1972)
- 11 May – Gerda Ring, actress (died 1999).
- 13 May – Fredrik Lange-Nielsen, mathematician (died 1980).
- 15 May – Halfdan Jønsson, trade unionist (died 1945).
- 20 May – Per Skou, international soccer player (died 1962)
- 28 May – Anders Jahre, shipping magnate (died 1982)
- 30 May – August Schønemann, singer, actor and comedian (died 1925).
- 8 June – Bjarne Pettersen, gymnast and Olympic gold medallist
- 20 June – Sjur Johnsen, wrestler and hammer thrower (died 1978).

=== July to September ===
- 3 July – Birger Brodtkorb, track and field athlete (died 1935)
- 3 July – Erling Jensen, gymnast and Olympic bronze medallist
- 6 July – Conrad Olsen, rower and Olympic bronze medallist (died 1970)
- 21 July – Ingvar Wedervang, economist and statistician (died 1961)
- 28 July – Anders Endreson Skrondal, politician (died 1968)
- 16 August – Henry Larsen, rower and Olympic bronze medallist
- 18 August – Mons Arntsen Løvset, politician (died 1972)
- 4 September – Alfred Sigurd Nilsen, politician (died 1977)
- 8 September – Martin Smeby, politician (died 1975)
- 9 September – Johan Lauritz Eidem, politician (died 1984)
- 20 September – Kristen Gundelach, poet (died 1971).
- 22 September – Klara Amalie Skoglund, politician (died 1978)

=== October to December ===
- 6 October – Olaf Hovdenak, long distance runner (died 1929)
- 25 October – Ola Olsen, politician (died 1973)
- 17 November – Sigurd Christiansen, novelist and playwright (died 1947).
- 20 November – Einar Berntsen, sailor and Olympic bronze medallist (died 1965)
- 14 December – Thor Ørvig, sailor and Olympic gold medallist (died 1965)
- 14 December – Sverre Reiten, politician (died 1965)

=== Full date unknown ===
- Birger Bergersen, politician and Minister (died 1977)
- Ludvig G. Braathen, shipping and airline magnate (died 1976)
- Hans Julius Gabrielsen, politician (died 1965)
- Toralv Øksnevad, politician, journalist, newspaper editor and radio personality (died 1975)
- Julius Sundsvik, novelist and newspaper editor (died 1971)

== Deaths ==
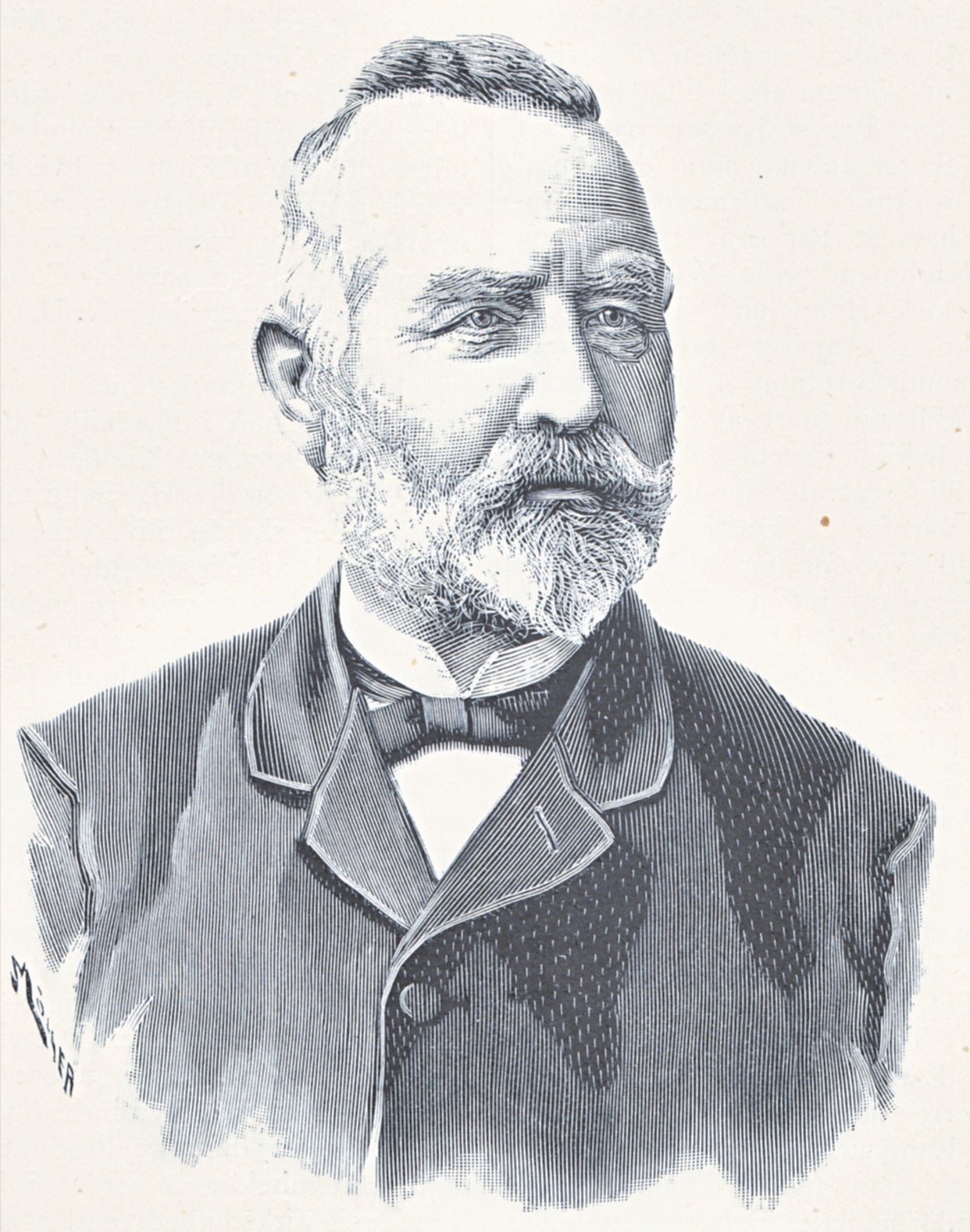
Mads Langaard

- 14 March – Minna Wetlesen, educator (born 1821).
- 23 March – Mads Langaard, brewery owner and industrialist (born 1815).
- 23 April – Harald Ulrik Sverdrup, priest and politician (born 1813)
- 23 June – Frederik Christian Stoud Platou, politician (born 1811)
- 13 July – Jens Holmboe, politician and Minister (born 1821)

=== Full date unknown ===
- Halvor Olaus Christensen, politician (born 1800)
- Daniel Otto Isaachsen, businessperson and politician (born 1806)
