= 1892 in Norway =

- Centuries: 17th; 18th; 19th; 20th; 21st
- Decades: 1870s; 1880s; 1890s; 1900s; 1910s
- See also: 1892 in Sweden; List of years in Norway

Events in the year 1892 in Norway.

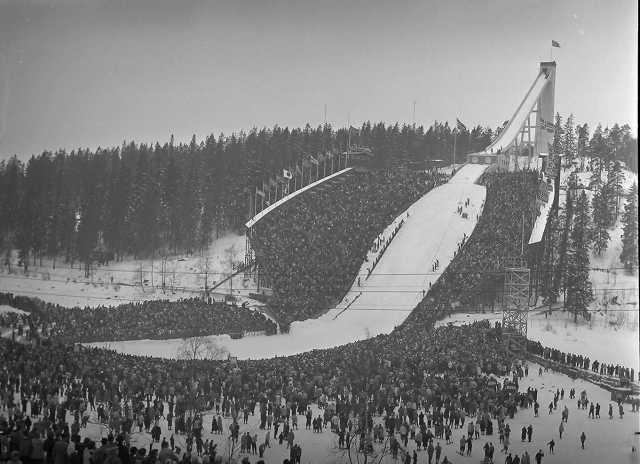
The Holmenkollen ski jump opens on 31 Januar

== Incumbents ==
- Monarch – Oscar II.
- Prime Minister – Otto Blehr (in Stockholm), Johannes Steen (in Christiania)

== Events ==
- 22 January - The first sunrise of the year in Tromsø is celebrated with a holiday and gunfire.
- 31 January - The Holmenkollen ski jump opens.
- June - The first organised Jewish community was established in Christiania, known as "Det Jødiske Samfund".
- July - A large fire destroyed a significant portion of the capital, Christiania (Oslo).
- 25 August - Norway's tourism now rivals Switzerland as "Europe's Playground", however the sea voyage required is still a barrier.
- Sweden rejects Norway’s request for a separate consular service.

== Arts and literature ==
- Mysteries by Knut Hamsun is published.
- Peace by Arne Garborg is published.

== Notable births ==
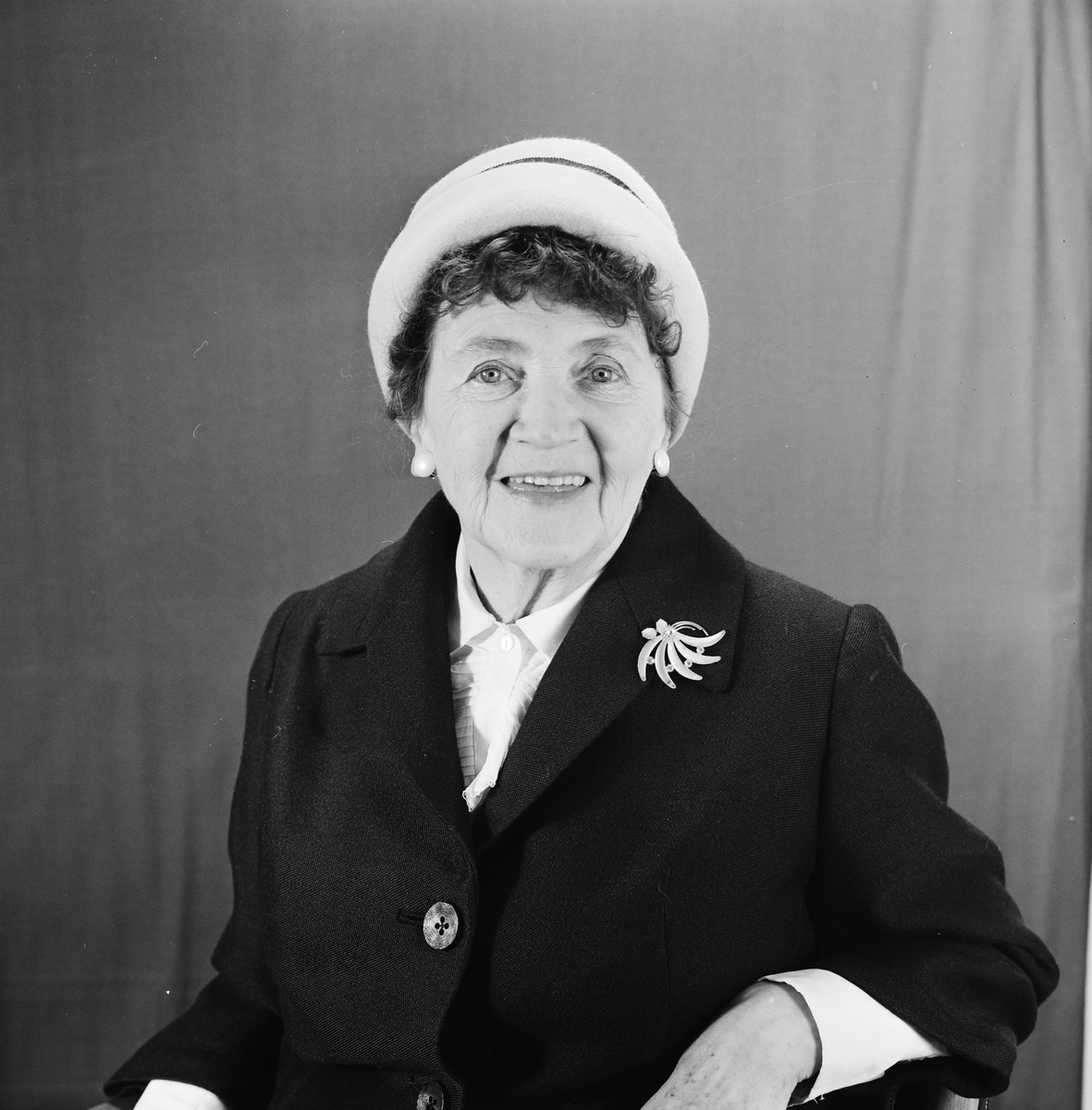
Gisken Wildenvey

- 5 January – John Johnsen, swimmer (died 1984)
- 1 February – Eugen Johansen, horse rider and Olympic silver medallist (died 1973)
- 5 February – Finn Bjørnseth, geodesist (died 1970).
- 6 February – Christian Wegner Haaland, ship-owner and politician (died 1952)
- 10 February – Christian Staib, sailor and Olympic gold medallist (died 1956)
- 23 February – Knut Severin Jakobsen Vik, politician (died 1972)
- 23 March – Gisken Wildenvey, writer (died 1985).
- 28 March – Gunnar Berg Lampe, tourist industry manager (died 1978).
- 31 March – Amund Rasmussen Skarholt, politician (died 1956)
- 2 April – Otto Huseklepp, politician (died 1964)
- 8 April – Aimée Sommerfelt, author (died 1975)
- 18 April – Lars Elisæus Vatnaland, politician (died 1983)
- 25 April – Max Herseth, rower and Olympic bronze medallist (died 1976)
- 27 April – Bjarne Johnsen, gymnast and Olympic gold medallist (died 1984)
- 5 May – Ingebjørg Øisang, politician (died 1956)
- 9 May – Einar Iveland, politician (died 1975).
- 12 May – Torleif Torkildsen, gymnast and Olympic bronze medallist (died 1944)
- 19 May – Karl Lunde, politician (died 1975)
- 24 May – Olaf Ingebretsen, gymnast and Olympic bronze medallist (died 1971)
- 30 May – Johannes Heimbeck, physician (died 1976).
- 22 June – Olav Aslakson Versto, politician (died 1977)
- 23 June – Johan Martin Holst, surgeon and military doctor (died 1953).
- 9 July – Erik Herseth, sailor and Olympic gold medallist (died 1993)
- 3 August – Olaf Sørensen, politician (died 1962)
- 5 August – Frithjof Sælen, gymnast and Olympic gold medallist (died 1975)
- 7 August – Erling Vinne, triple jumper (died 1963)
- 4 September – Theodor Platou, brewer (d. 1969) .
- 17 October – Olav Hindahl, trade unionist and politician (died 1963)
- 29 October – Anton Berge, agronomist and politician (died 1951)
- 29 October – Sigurd Høgaas, politician (died 1969)
- 23 November – Georg Brustad, gymnast and Olympic bronze medallist (died 1932)
- 27 December – Morten Ansgar Kveim, pathologist (died 1966)
- 28 December – Alfred Nilsen, politician (died 1977)

=== Full date unknown ===
- Thomas Offenberg Backer, engineer (died 1987)
- Jens Gram Dunker, architect (died 1981)
- Anders Frihagen, politician and Minister (died 1979)
- Nils Hjelmtveit, politician and Minister (died 1985)
- Alf Sommerfelt, linguist and first professor of linguistics in Norway (died 1965)
- Peter Torjesen, missionary to China (died 1939)
- Herman Willoch, painter (died 1968)

== Notable deaths ==
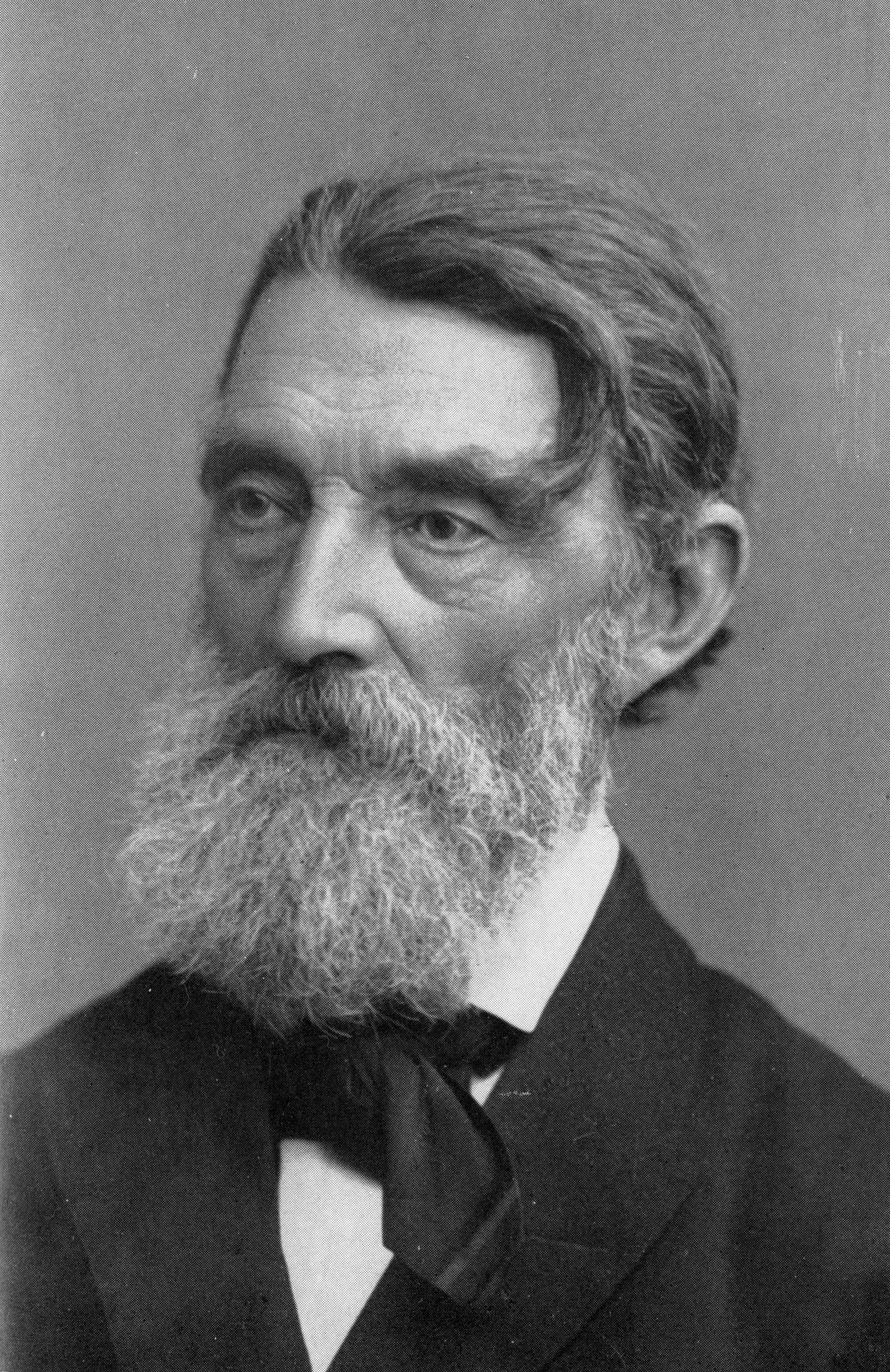
Johan Sverdrup

- 18 January – Wincentz Thurmann Ihlen, engineer and industrialist (born 1826)
- 3 February – Jørund Telnes, farmer, teacher, writer and politician (born 1845).
- 11 February – Henriette Homann, photographer and painter (born 1819).
- 17 February – Johan Sverdrup, politician and first Prime Minister of Norway (born 1816)
- 22 May – Ananias Dekke, ships designer (born 1832).
- 14 October – Peter Nicolai Arbo, painter (born 1831)
- 25 October – Jens Theodor Paludan Vogt, engineer (born 1830)

=== Full date unknown ===
- Jacob Bøckmann Barth, forester (born 1822)
- Lars Kristiansen Blilie, politician (born 1820)
- Jørgen Aall Flood, politician, vice consul and businessman (born 1820)
- Carsten Tank Nielsen, politician and Minister (born 1818)
