= 1983 in Norway =

- Centuries: 18th; 19th; 20th; 21st
- Decades: 1960s; 1970s; 1980s; 1990s; 2000s
- See also: List of years in Norway

Events in the year 1983 in Norway.

== Incumbents ==
- Monarch – Olav V.
- Prime Minister – Kåre Willoch (Conservative Party)

== Events ==
- 18 March – Arnfinn Nesset is convicted of poisoning 22 patients with Curacit, a muscle relaxing drug, at a Geriatric institution in Orkdal Municipality, Norway where he was the director since 1977. Nesset was sentenced to 21 years in prison; the maximum punishment possible by Norwegian law.
- 8 June – Willoch's Second Cabinet was appointed.
- 18 August – Much of the Archbishop's Palace in Trondheim burned down.
- Municipal and county elections are held throughout the country.
- Dagbladet switched to tabloid format.
- 100 years since the foundation of the Norwegian State Railways.

== Popular culture ==
=== Film ===
==== Events ====
- Odd Abrahamsen, poet, is awarded the Riksmål Society Literature Prize.
- Karin Bang, poet and novelist, is awarded the Gyldendal's Endowment literature prize.

==== Novels ====
- Kjartan Fløgstad – U 3
- Herbjørg Wassmo – Det stumme rommet

==== Short stories ====
- Merethe Lindstrøm – Sexorcisten og andre fortellinger

== Notable births ==
- 4 January – Tarjei Dale, footballer
- 11 January – Kristian P. Wilsgård, businessman and politician.
- 16 January – Tommy Eide Møster, footballer
- 3 February – Adil Khan, actor
- 8 February – Agnes Ravatn, novelist, columnist and journalist
- 9 March – Johan Kjølstad, cross-country skier
- 27 March – Maria Bodøgaard, television presenter
- 30 March – Siri Seglem, handball player.
- 20 April – Gaute Ormåsen, singer
- 7 May – Lars Iver Strand, footballer
- 21 June – Bjørn Helge Riise, footballer
- 1 July – Marit Larsen, singer and songwriter
- 18 July – Hadia Tajik, politician
- 20 July – Stig-André Berge, wrestler.
- 2 August – Marianne Rørvik, curler
- 19 August – Johan Thorbjørnsen, footballer
- 28 October – Øyvind Hoås, footballer
- 7 November – Patrick Thoresen, ice hockey player
- 18 November – Jon Lech Johansen, programmer
- 9 December – Kristofer Hæstad, footballer

== Notable deaths ==
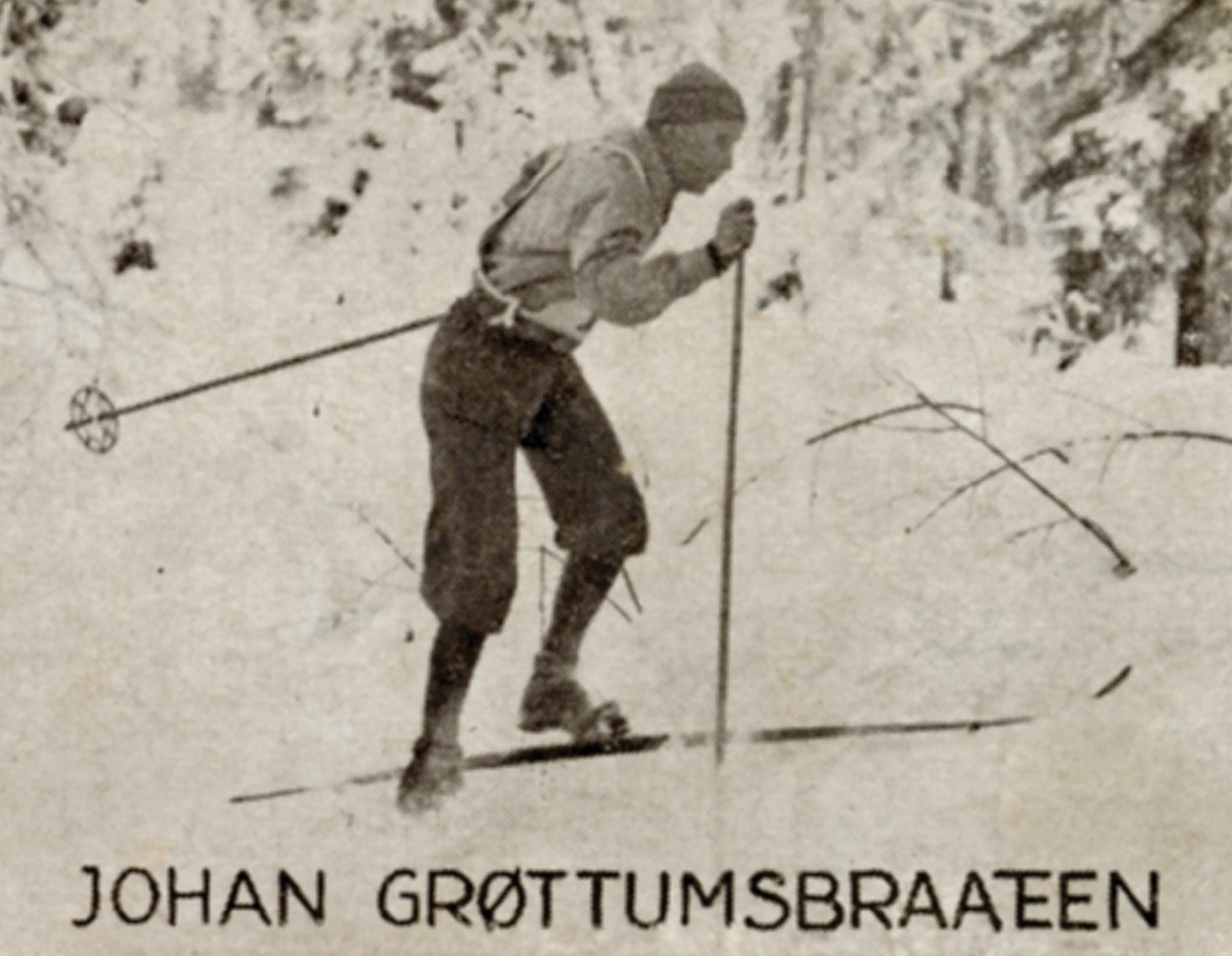
Ca. 1930

- 3 January – Ludvig Ellefsrød, politician (born 1894)
- 16 January
  - Gunnar S. Gundersen, painter (born 1921)
  - Arnfinn Severin Roald, politician (born 1914)
- 24 January – Johan Grøttumsbråten, skier and multiple Olympic gold medallist (born 1899)
- 10 February – Paul Oskar Lindberget, politician (born 1895)
- 7 March – Odd Lundberg, speed skater and Olympic silver medallist (born 1917)
- 9 March – Lars Elisæus Vatnaland, politician (born 1892)
- 7 April – Einar Hareide, politician (born 1899)
- 12 April – Jørgen Juve, international soccer player and Olympic bronze medallist (born 1906)
- 14 April – Kåre Hatten, cross-country skier (born 1908).
- 17 April – Kittill Kristoffersen Berg, politician (born 1903)
- 25 April – Hans Struksnæs, sailor and Olympic silver medallist (born 1902)
- 23 May – Finn Mortensen, composer, critic and educator (born 1922)
- 26 May – Asbjørn Lillås, politician (born 1919)
- 12 June – Conrad Bonnevie-Svendsen, priest and politician (born 1898)
- 23 June – Sverre Steen, historian (born 1898).
- 25 June – Oddbjørn Hagen, skier, Olympic gold medallist and World Champion (born 1908)
- 7 August – Henning Thorvaldssøn Astrup, architect (born 1904).
- 16 August – Ragnvald Skrede, author, journalist, literary critic and translator (born 1904)
- 26 August – Hans Christian Henriksen, businessperson (born 1909)
- 10 September – Torstein Selvik, politician (born 1900)
- 12 September – Hans Borgen, politician (born 1908)
- 2 October – Helga Stene, educator (born 1904).
- 4 October – Per Hagen, politician (born 1899)
- 14 October – Halldis Stenhamar, journalist (born 1894).
- 16 October – Øivin Fjeldstad, conductor and violinist (born 1903)
- 17 October – Sonja Hagemann, literary historian and literary critic (born 1898)
- 20 October – Otto Aasen, Nordic skier (born 1894)
- 22 October – Per Thomsen, newspaper editor (born 1905).
- 28 October – Gabriel Langfeldt, psychiatrist (born 1895).
- 7 November – Einar Tommelstad, high jumper (born 1909)
- 18 November – Leo Tallaksen, politician (born 1908)
- 26 November – Oddmund Hoel, politician (born 1910)
- 10 December – Tolv Aamland, politician (born 1893)
- 21 December – Kjell Bondevik, politician and Minister (born 1901)

=== Full date missing ===
- Christian Astrup, economist and politician for Nasjonal Samling (born 1909).
- Rasmus Nordbø, politician and Minister (born 1915)
- Hans Fredrik Wirstad, veterinarian (born 1897)
