= 1820 in Norway =

- Centuries: 17th; 18th; 19th; 20th; 21st
- Decades: 1800s; 1810s; 1820s; 1830s; 1840s
- See also: 1820 in Sweden; List of years in Norway

Events in the year 1820 in Norway.

== Incumbents ==
- Monarch: Charles III John.

== Arts and literature ==
- The song Sønner av Norge is written by Henrik Anker Bjerregaard and Christian Blom.

== Births ==
- 5 April – Josephine Thrane, teacher and political activist (d.1862).
- 18 June – Martin Andreas Udbye, composer and organist (d.1889)
- 12 August – Hans Henrik Wærenskjold, politician (d.1909)
- 27 December – Jens Amundsen, ship-owner (d.1886)

=== Full date unknown ===
- Lars Kristiansen Blilie, politician (d.1892)
- Erik Eriksen, ice sea captain (d.1888)
- Jørgen Aall Flood, politician, vice consul and businessman (d.1892)

== Deaths ==
- 5 May – Søren Georg Abel, priest and politician (b.1772)
