= 1818 in Norway =

- Centuries: 17th; 18th; 19th; 20th; 21st
- Decades: 1790s; 1800s; 1810s; 1820s; 1830s
- See also: 1818 in Sweden; List of years in Norway

Events in the year 1818 in Norway.

== Incumbents ==
- Monarch: Charles II (until 5 February); then Charles III John.

== Events ==
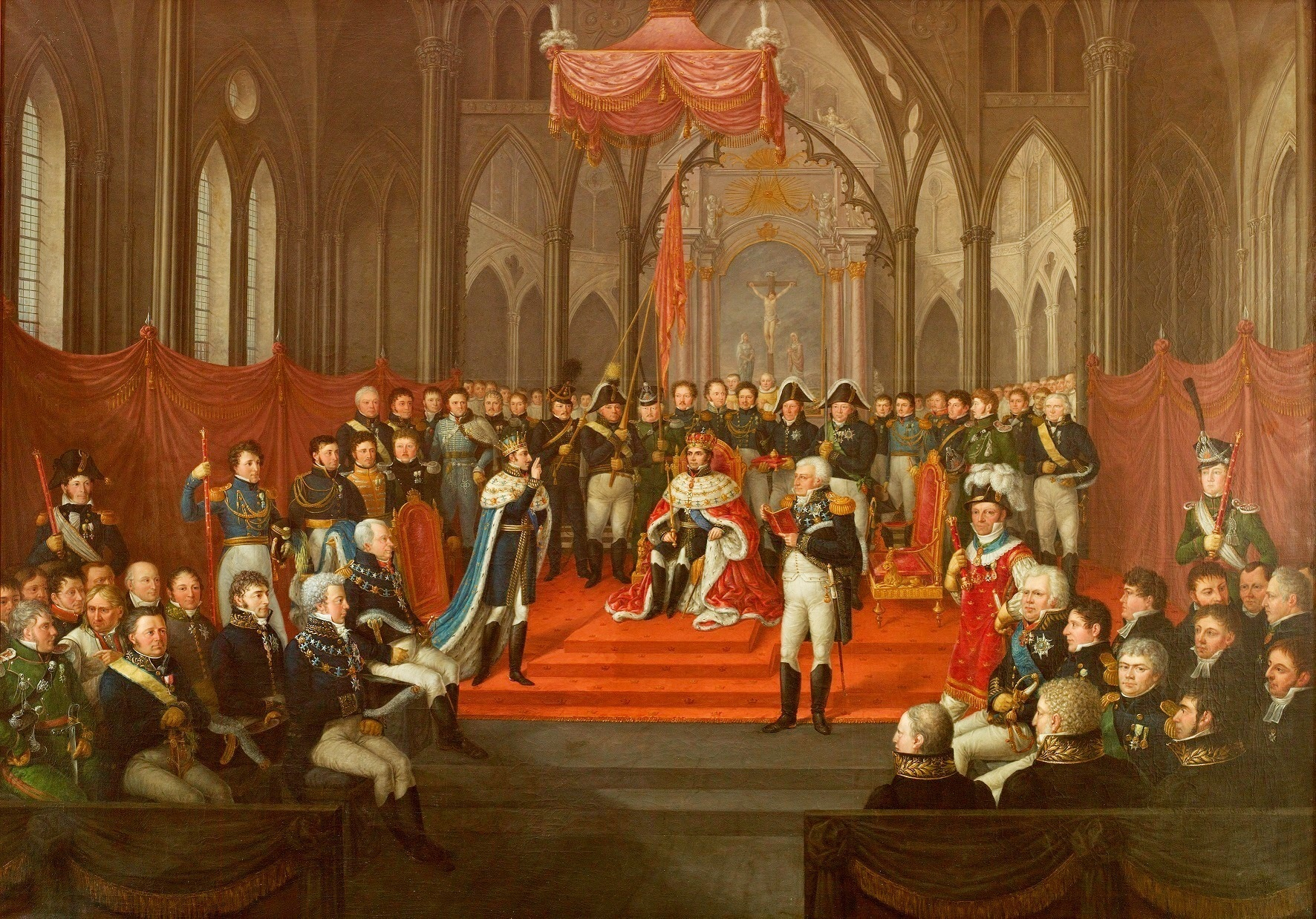
Coronation of Charles III John in Nidaros Cathedral 1818

- 5 February – Carl III of Sweden-Norway became King of Sweden and King of Norway following the death of Charles XIII.
- 7 September – Carl III of Sweden-Norway is crowned king of Norway, in Trondheim.
- 24 September – Start of the Bodø affair, a diplomatic scandal involving Sweden-Norway and the United Kingdom.
- Johan August Sandels is appointed Governor-general of Norway.

== Notable births ==
- 14 January – Ole Jacob Broch, politician and Minister (died 1889).
- 13 February – Rolf Olsen, politician (died 1864)
- 6 April – Aasmund Olavsson Vinje, poet, journalist and writer (died 1870).
- 24 September – Diderik Iversen Tønseth, politician (died 1893)

=== Full date unknown ===
- Job Dischington Bødtker, jurist and politician (died 1889)
- Carl Peter Parelius Essendrop, bishop, politician and Minister (died 1893)
- Jacob Lerche Johansen, politician and Minister (died 1900)
- Henrik Andreas Zetlitz Lassen, politician
- Thorvald Meyer, businessperson (died 1909)
- Carsten Tank Nielsen, politician and Minister (died 1892)

== Notable deaths ==
- 5 March - Johan Andreas Cornelius Ohme, army officer (born 1746)
- 25 March – Caspar Wessel, mathematician (born 1745).

=== Full date unknown ===
- Anders Trulsson Bruland, civil servant and politician (born 1770)
