= 1819 in Norway =

- Centuries: 17th; 18th; 19th; 20th; 21st
- Decades: 1790s; 1800s; 1810s; 1820s; 1830s
- See also: 1819 in Sweden; List of years in Norway

Events in the year 1819 in Norway.

== Incumbents ==
- Monarch: Charles III John.

== Events ==
- 31 August – A significant earthquake (estimated M5.9±0.2) struck near Lurøy in Northern Norway.

== Arts and literature ==
- Det Dramatiske Selskab in Fredrikshald is founded.
- Morgenbladet, the first Norwegian daily newspaper, was released for the first time.

== Births ==
- 3 January – Henriette Homann, photographer and painter (d. 1892).
- 13 March – Henriette Wienecke, composer (d. 1907)
- 13 July – Jacobine Gjertz, pianist, composer and writer (d. 1862).
- 5 August – Valdemar Knudsen, sugar cane plantation pioneer in Hawaii (d. 1898)

=== Full date unknown ===
- Ivar Christian Sommerschild Geelmuyden, politician (d. 1875)
- Sivert Christensen Strøm, jurist and politician (d. 1902)

== Deaths ==
- 3 March – Jens Stub, politician (born 1764)
- 30 October - Anders Hansen Grønneberg, farmer and politician (born 1779).
