= 1822 in Norway =

- Centuries: 17th; 18th; 19th; 20th; 21st
- Decades: 1800s; 1810s; 1820s; 1830s; 1840s
- See also: 1822 in Sweden; List of years in Norway

Events in the year 1822 in Norway.

== Incumbents ==
- Monarch: Charles III John.
- First Minister: Jonas Collett

== Events ==
- March 11 – A powerful sudden storm struck the western Norwegian coast killing about 300 men at sea.
- May 26 – 116 people die in the Grue Church fire. It's the biggest fire disaster in Norway's history.

== Births ==
- 27 April – Karl Hals, businessperson and politician (d.1898)
- 29 October – Thomas Johannessen Heftye, businessperson, politician and philanthropist (d.1886)

=== Full date unknown ===
- Jacob Bøckmann Barth, forester (d.1892)
- Jess Julius Engelstad, engineer and railroad administrator (d.1896)
- Rasmus Tønder Nissen, politician (d.1882)
- Olav Paulssøn, bailiff, writer and politician (d.1896)
- Ole Peter Petersen, founder of Methodism in Norway and co-founder of Norwegian and Danish Methodism in the United States (d.1901)
- Karl Andreas Larsen Vefring, politician

== Deaths ==
- 16 February — Claus Pavels, bishop (b.1769)

=== Full date unknown ===
- Mathias Hagerup, politician (b.1765)
- Sara Oust, revivalist lay preacher (b.1778)
