= Gundelach =

Gundelach is a surname. Notable people with the surname include:

- Finn Olav Gundelach (1925–1981), Danish diplomat and European Commissioner
- Gustav Gundelach (1888–1962), German politician
- Hans-Jürgen Gundelach (born 1963), German footballer
- Herbert Gundelach (1899–1971), German World War II general
- Herlind Gundelach (born 1949), German politician
- Kristen Gundelach, Norwegian poet and translator
- Mark Gundelach (born 1992), Danish footballer

== See also ==
- Gundlach
