= Wærenskjold =

Wærenskjold is a surname of Norwegian origin. People with that name include:

- Hans Henrik Wærenskjold (1820-1909), Norwegian politician
- Søren Wærenskjold (born 2000), Norwegian cyclist
