= Fliflet =

Fliflet is a surname. Notable people with the surname include:

- Albert Lange Fliflet (1908–2001), Norwegian philologist and translator
- Arne Fliflet (born 1946), Norwegian jurist and civil servant
- Elise Fliflet (1893–1991), Norwegian politician
- Gabriel Fliflet (born 1958), Norwegian accordion player and vocalist
