= Halfdan Petterøe =

Norwegian businessperson (1876–1939)

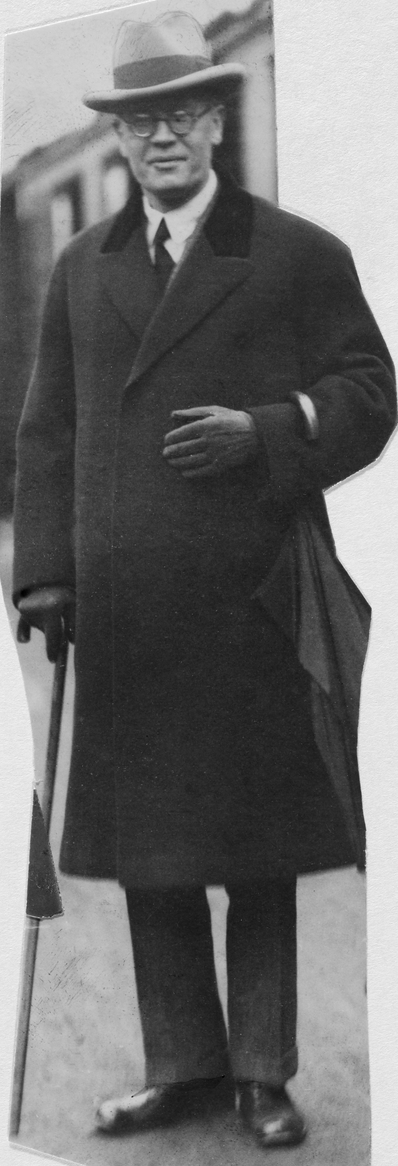
Halfdan in 1932

Halfdan Petterøe (22 February 1876 – 3 September 1939) was a Norwegian businessperson, founder of the tobacco brand Petterøes.

He was born in Nøtterøy Municipality as a son of Elias Petterøe (1844–1887) and Amalie Elisabeth Hansen (1849–1933). In 1902 he married treasurer Karen Abel Helene Elise Falchenberg (1874–1945). His daughter Aase (1904–59) followed him as CEO on his death. She was married to chief physician Knut Aas, and another daughter Eva (1908–94) was married to architect Christian Astrup.

He moved to Kristiania in 1892, took commercial training and was hired in Tiedemanns Tobakksfabrikk. In 1900 he established his own company, an import and trade company for tobacco, and in 1905 he founded the tobacco factory H. Petterøe Tobakkfabrikk. Within ten years he led the third largest tobacco company in Norway, and one of the few newer tobacco establishments that managed to thrive.

He aligned with the Liberal Party, chairing the party chapter in Kristiania city from 1910 to 1913 and serving as a deputy city councilman from 1911 to 1916. Petterøe also chaired the municipal provisioning council in Kristiania from 1916 to 1922. After this he was selected by the government as chair of Vinmonopolet, serving from 1922 to 1926, and was a shareowner and board member of the Liberal newspaper Dagbladet from 1912 to 1935. He served as chair from 1921 to 1923 and since 1929. He withdrew from Dagbladet after a row with editor-in-chief Einar Skavlan, who he deemed too critical to the Liberal government.

From 1920 to 1923 and in 1931 Petterøe chaired the interest organization Tobakksfabrikantenes landsforening. He was also a board member of Centralbanken from 1922 to 1926 and of Kristiania Port Authority. He died in September 1939 in Oslo.

Business positions
New office	Chair of Vinmonopolet; 1922–1926	Succeeded by
