= Huseklepp =

Huseklepp is a surname. Notable people with the surname include:

- Erik Huseklepp (born 1984), Norwegian footballer and coach
- Ingvald Huseklepp (born 1949), Norwegian footballer, father of Erik
- Otto Huseklepp (1892–1964), Norwegian politician
