= Bjørnseth =

Bjørnseth is a Norwegian surname. Notable people with the surname include:

- Bjørn Bjørnseth (1888–1976), Norwegian equestrian
- Finn Bjørnseth (geodesist)
- Finn Bjørnseth (1924–1973), Norwegian novelist, poet, and short story writer
