= Rolf Olsen =

Rolf Olsen may refer to:

- Rolf Olsen (actor) (1919–1998), German actor, screenwriter and film director
- Rolf Olsen (canoeist) (born 1938), Norwegian sprint canoeist
- Rolf Olsen (Norwegian politician) (1818–1864), Norwegian politician and playwright
- Rolf Olsen (American politician), American politician

== See also ==
- Rolf Olsson (1949–2007), politician
