= 1821 in Norway =

- Centuries: 17th; 18th; 19th; 20th; 21st
- Decades: 1800s; 1810s; 1820s; 1830s; 1840s
- See also: 1821 in Sweden; List of years in Norway

Events in the year 1821 in Norway.

== Incumbents ==
- Monarch: Charles III John.

== Events ==
- 1 August - The Nobility of Norway is abolished.
- Fredrik Meltzer designs the modern flag of Norway to replace the modified Danish and Swedish flags then in use.
- Thomas Fasting became the first individual ever convicted in an impeachment trial by the Norwegian Constitutional Court of the Realm (Riksrett).
- The town of Lillesand is founded.

== Births ==
- 18 January – Minna Wetlesen, educator (died 1891).
- 2 May – Jens Andreas Friis, linguist and author (d.1896)
- 14 July – Jens Holmboe, politician and Minister (d.1891)
- 17 August – Jacob Andreas Michelsen, businessperson and politician (d.1902)
- 23 August – Christian Collett Kjerschow, politician (d.1889)
- 24 October – James DeNoon Reymert, newspaper editor, mine operator, lawyer and politician (d.1896)
- 18 November – Johan Jørgen Lange Hanssen, politician (d.1889)

=== Full date unknown ===
- Eilev Jonsson Steintjønndalen, Hardanger fiddle maker (d.1876)

== Deaths ==
- 14 January – Jens Zetlitz, priest and poet (b.1761)
- 5 March – Gabriel Schanche Kielland, businessman and ship owner (b.1760)
- 20 May – Abraham Pihl, clergyman, astronomer and architect (b.1756).
- 21 November – Jonas Rein, priest, poet and member of the Norwegian Constituent Assembly at Eidsvoll (b.1760)
