= Mathias Larsen Blilie =

Norwegian politician

Mathias Larsen Blilie (2 October 1854 – 25 April 1929) was a Norwegian politician for the Liberal Party and the Liberal Left Party.

He was elected to the Norwegian Parliament in 1907, representing the Liberal Party and the constituency of Toten. He was re-elected in 1910, but this time representing the Liberal Left Party.

Born in Vestre Toten, his father Lars Kristian Blilie was a member of Parliament too. Mathias Blilie worked as a farmer, and was also director of the local savings bank and insurance company for some time.

He was a member of Vestre Toten municipal council for twenty-eight years. He served as mayor of Vestre Toten from 1902 to 1907, and when the municipality Eina was created in 1908, he served as its first mayor. He stepped down after the year 1910.
