= Gundlach =

Gundlach is a German surname. Notable people with the surname include:

- David Gundlach (1955–2011), American film producer
- Ernst Gundlach (1834–1908), German-American inventor of optical instruments
- F. C. Gundlach (1926–2021), German art dealer, photographer, and curator
- Herman Gundlach (1913–2005), American football player
- Jeffrey Gundlach (born 1959), American bond trader
- Jens H. Gundlach (born 1961), German physicist
- Juan Gundlach (1810–1896), German-Cuban naturalist and taxonomist
- Rudolf Gundlach (1892–1957), Polish engineer, inventor of the tank periscope
- Robert Gundlach (1926–2010), American physicist and inventor
- Thies Gundlach (born 1956), German theologian
- Willi Gundlach (1929-2025), German choral conductor and musicologist

== See also ==
- Gundelach
