= 1823 in Norway =

- Centuries: 17th; 18th; 19th; 20th; 21st
- Decades: 1800s; 1810s; 1820s; 1830s; 1840s
- See also: 1823 in Sweden; List of years in Norway

Events in the year 1823 in Norway.

== Incumbents ==
- Monarch: Charles III John.
- First Minister: Jonas Collett

== Events ==
- King Carl III (Karl Johan) ordered to build the royal palace in Christiania.
- Bergens Sparebank was established. It is Norway's second oldest bank.

== Arts and literature ==
- Det Dramatiske Selskab in Stavanger was founded.

== Births ==
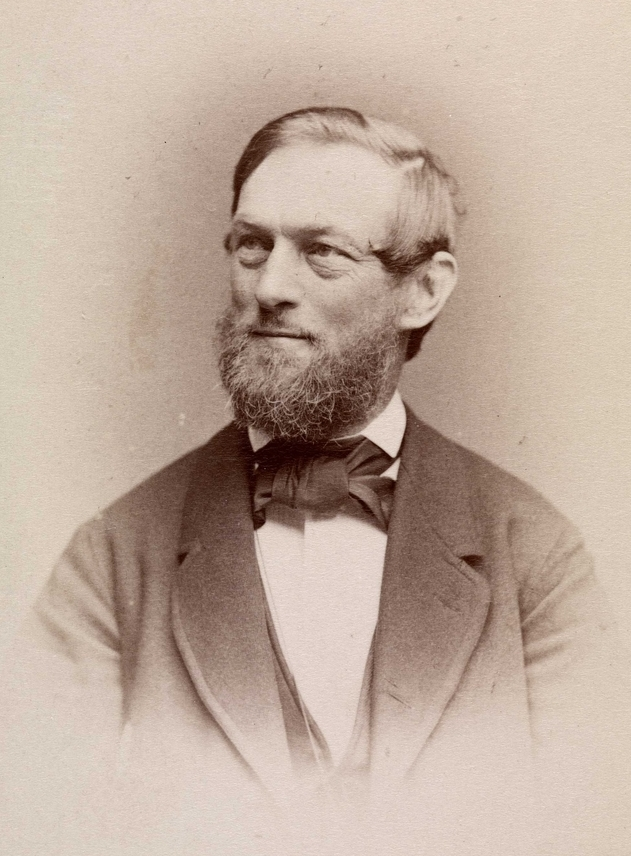
Jacob Dybwad

- 6 January – Aimar August Sørenssen, politician and Minister (d.1908)
- 14 April – Christian Jensen, politician and Minister (d.1884)
- 7 June – Jørgen Breder Faye, banker and politician (d.1908)
- 20 July – Jacob Dybwad, bookseller and publisher (d. 1899).
- 8 October – Sivert Andreas Nielsen, politician (d.1904)
- 26 November – Thomas Tellefsen, pianist and composer (d.1874)
- 21 December – Asbjørn Kloster, social reformer and leader of the Norwegian temperance movement. (d. 1876 in Norway)

=== Full date unknown ===
- Lars Christian Dahll, politician and Minister (d.1908)
- Simon Pedersen Holmesland, politician (d.1895)
- Sofie Parelius, actress (died 1902)

== Deaths ==
- 16 December - Hans Carl Knudtzon, merchant, ship-owner and politician (b. 1751)
