= Arne Langset =

Norwegian politician

Arne Langset (25 February 1893 – 10 December 1971) was a Norwegian politician for the Liberal Party.

He served as a deputy representative to the Norwegian Parliament from Nordland during the terms 1950–1953 and 1954–1957.
