= Johan Anker Johansen =

Norwegian artistic gymnast

- Born: 18 March 1894 Fredrikstad, United Kingdoms of Sweden and Norway
- Died: 14 December 1986 (aged 92) Oslo, Norway

Gymnastics career
- Discipline: Men's artistic gymnastics
- Country represented: Norway
- Gym: Fredrikstad Turnforening
Medal record
Men's artistic gymnastics
Representing Norway
Olympic Games
Silver medal – second place	1920 Antwerp	Team, free system

Johan Anker Johansen (18 March 1894 – 14 December 1986) was a Norwegian gymnast who competed in the 1920 Summer Olympics. He was part of the Norwegian team, which won the gold medal in the gymnastics men's team, free system event.
