= Julius Sundsvik =

Norwegian novelist and newspaper editor

Julius Elian Røring Sundsvik (16 June 1891 - 11 March 1971) was a Norwegian novelist and newspaper editor.

Born in Brønnøy Municipality, Helgeland, he published the novels Slitets folk (1940), Sønnen (1941) and Oppover igjen (1945) with motifs from Northern Norway. He was also the editor-in-chief of Moss Avis in Moss from 1934 to 1964.
