= Arne Damm =

Norwegian military officer and publisher

- Born: 8 September 1894; Kristiania, Norway
- Died: 2 December 1968 (aged 74)
- Education: Norwegian Military Academy; Norwegian Military College
- Occupations: Military officer, publisher and travel writer
- Employer: N. W. Damm & Søn
- Organizations: Norwegian Publishers' Association; Norwegian Booksellers Association
- Awards: Defence Medal 1940–1945

Arne Damm (8 September 1894 – 2 December 1968) was a Norwegian military officer, publisher and travel writer. He managed, from 1930, the publishing house N. W. Damm & Søn that his grandfather had established in 1843.

== Personal life and military career ==
Damm was born on 8 September 1894 in Kristiania as a son of Harald Christian Damm (1847–1931) and Abigael Christiane Brinck Nissen (1863–1945). After finishing his secondary education in 1912 he graduated from the Norwegian Military Academy in 1915 and the Norwegian Military College in 1917. He held the rank of Captain from 1930 and Major from 1937. During the German occupation of Norway he was arrested in June 1942, first in Møllergata 19 and then in Grini concentration camp. On 9 July 1942 he was interned in officers' prisoner camps in Schokken, Grüne, Schildberg and Luckenwalde. After the war he was decorated with the Defence Medal 1940–1945.

== Business and literary career ==
In 1930 Damm commenced as managing director of publishing house N. W. Damm & Søn, a family business and also one of Norway's major publishing houses. Damm himself issued a number of books about travel and tourism; Friluftsliv (with Axel Printz, 1941), Look at Norway (1949, with Carl Just) and Oslo, Capital of Norway (1950). From 1939 to 1951 he edited Gløtt av Norge, photo books about Norway which were released intermittently. He was a board member of Hotel Bristol, deputy board member of the Norwegian Publishers' Association and Norwegian Booksellers Association.

He died in Oslo on 2 December 1968.
