= Alfred Nilsen =

Norwegian politician

Alfred Nilsen (28 December 1892 – 22 March 1977) was a Norwegian politician for the Liberal Party.

He was born in Tromsø.

He was elected to the Norwegian Parliament from the Market towns of Nordland, Troms and Finnmark in 1950, but was not re-elected in 1954. Instead he served in the position of deputy representative during the terms 1954–1957 and 1958–1961.

Nilsen held various positions in Tromsø city council from 1922 to 1964, serving as mayor in the periods 1937–1941 and 1945.
