= Daniel Skjeldam =

Norwegian business executive

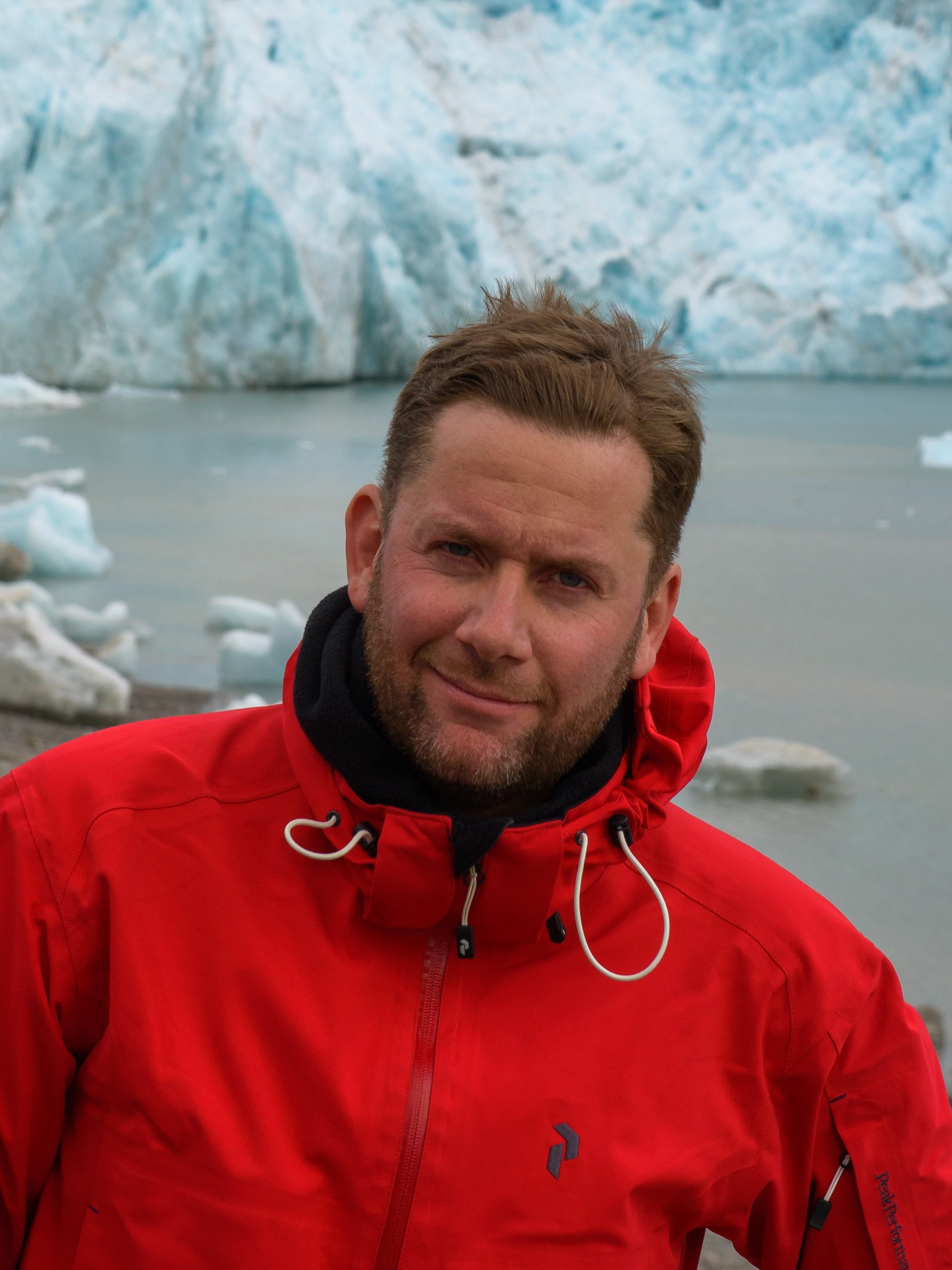
Daniel Skjeldam

Daniel Andreas Skjeldam (born 2 September 1975 in Saint Didier sur Rochefort) is a Norwegian business leader and the former chief executive officer of Hurtigruten.

== Education ==
Skjeldam holds an MBA from the Norwegian School of Economics in Bergen in 2001, his final paper entitled "Success factors for low-cost airlines."

== Career ==
After graduation he was part of the start-up team of Norwegian Air Shuttle where he started out on short-term contracts, then became head of airport operations, chief of the route network and revenue management, before he finished with five years as its commercial director.

== Hurtigruten ==
Trygve Hegnar, the largest shareholder in Hurtigruten, personally headhunted Skjeldam to the position of CEO of the company in the autumn of 2012. That made him the youngest leader of a listed Norwegian company. After accepting the position Skjeldam stated that "Hurtigruten remain the real thing in a world that is increasingly dominated by big white cruise ships", and that "Hurtigruten will regain Scandinavia and Asia, as well as extend the season for British tourists chasing the Northern Lights". He immediately made major changes to the company: Hurtigruten's headquarters were moved to Tromsø and several properties and non-strategic assets were sold off. The land organization in the Nordic countries were trimmed by 25-30 percent and a separate crew company was established. The goal was to enable annual saving of more than 60 million NOK (approximately US$10 million) and increase the focus on commercial operations, especially hotel and restaurant operations of vessels. On 15 May 2013 Skjeldam announced Hurtigruten's first positive earnings in nine years. In June 2013 the local newspaper Fremover reported Hurtigruten had decided against major objections of the mayor of Narvik to move the staffing office for maritime employees from Narvik to Kirkenes triggering a supposed saving of 40 million NOK (approximately US$7 million) per year.

In 2024 Skjeldam left his CEO position of HX Hurtigruten and he joined the board for Hurtigruten.
