= Sig Haugdahl =

Norwegian racing driver (1891–1970)

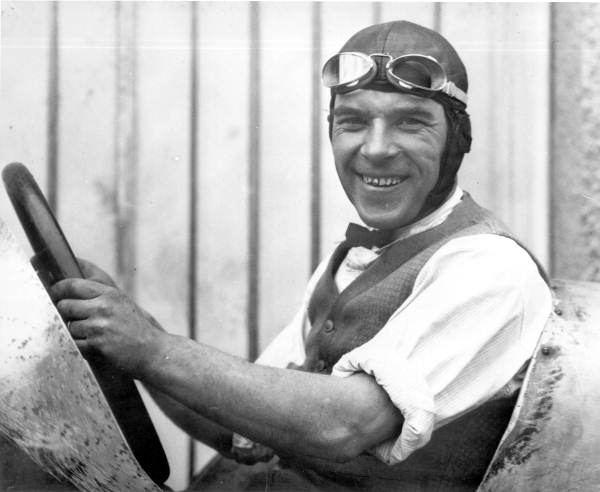
Sig Haugdahl (1922) seated at the wheel of his Miller 8 Special

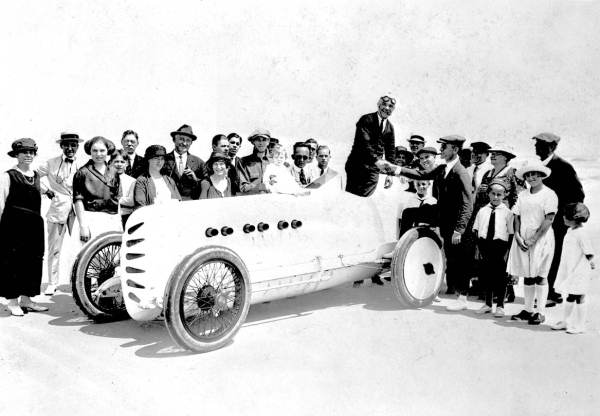
Sig Haugdahl shaking hands with Mayor Guy S. Bailey of Daytona Beach, in 1922

Sigurd Olson "Sig" Haugdahl (January 10, 1891 – February 4, 1970) was an IMCA "Big Car" (now sprint car) champion 1927 – 1932 and an early promoter of stock car racing in the United States.

== Background ==
Sig Haugdahl was born on the Tiller farm in Verdal Municipality, Nord-Trøndelag, Norway and migrated to the United States in 1910.

== Racing career ==
Haugdahl's U.S. racing career in 1912, when he drove a specially equipped Indian Motorcycle in ice races in Minnesota. He began dirt track racing in 1918. He became the IMCA champion six years in a row, between 1927 and 1932. He built the Wisconsin Special to unseat USAC champion Tommy Milton. The car was named after its 836 cubic inch Wisconsin Airplane 6-cylinder motor, which was directly connected to the rear wheels. The car was 192 inches (4,900 mm) long, 20 inches (510 mm) wide, and had 250 horsepower (190 kW). The speed would first be exceeded after over ten years. Haugdahl is credited with winning the International Motor Contest Association (IMCA) sprint car national championships in 1927, 1928, 1929, 1930, 1931, and 1932.

== World speed record ==
Haugdahl is reported to have set a world land speed record of 180 miles per hour in his Wisconsin Special car at the Daytona Beach Road Course on April 7, 1922. A world record was not awarded, however, because the run was not timed by the American Automobile Association and as such could not be verified. It is considered by some that the record speed was claimed by IMCA for the promotional benefits that it would offer. If true, this record would have represented a record speed 50 mph (80 km/h) faster than the official record, set by a car with a quarter less power than the current holder, five years before the official record reached this level.

== Daytona Beach Road Course ==
World land speed record attempts moved from Daytona to the more consistent surface at the Bonneville Salt Flats with Campbell's Blue Bird in 1935. Not wishing to lose the valuable visitor trade, Daytona Beach officials asked local racer Haugdahl to organize and promote an automobile race along the 3.2-mile (5.1 km) course. Haugdahl is credited for designing the track. The city posted at $5,000 purse. The ticket-takers arrived at the event to find thousands of fans already at the track. The sandy turns became virtually impassable, and the event was stopped after 75 of 78 laps. The city has not promoted an event since.

Haugdahl talked with another local driver named Bill France Sr., and they talked the Daytona Beach Elks Club to host another event in 1937. The event was more successful, but still lost money. Haugdahl didn't promote any more events. France used the experience to found NASCAR.

== Award ==
Sig Haugdahl died at 79 years of age in Jacksonville, Florida. Haugdahl was inducted in the National Sprint Car Hall of Fame in 1994.

== Other sources ==
- Fleischman, Bill and Al Pearce The Unauthorized NASCAR Fan Guide 1998-99 (Visible Ink Press: 1999) ISBN 1-57859-093-0, ISBN 978-1-57859-093-3
