= Sigurd Høgaas =

Norwegian politician

Sigurd Høgaas (29 October 1892 – 12 December 1969) was a Norwegian politician for the Labour Party.

He served as a deputy representative to the Norwegian Parliament from Østfold during the term 1945–1949.
