= Selina Toyomasu =

Indian-Norwegian musician and singer

Selina Toyomasu, née Selina Grinsted (born 1975) is an Indian-Norwegian musician and singer. She is known for the album Soul Fire from 2004.

== Personal life ==
She was born in Amersham as a daughter of an Indian musician and a Norwegian mother. At the age of 5 she came to Oslo with her family. At a young age she self-released the album Selina. At the time her album Soul Fire was released in 2004, she was a student of physical education at Telemark University College at Notodden. She also studied folk music at the campus in Rauland. Later she also studied music at the Liverpool Institute of Performing Arts.

She married Jo Toyomasu, who was of Japanese ancestry. They are now divorced.

== Soul Fire ==
Soul Fire

Studio album by Selina Toyomasu
- Released: May 2004
- Genre: Ethno-pop
- Label: Via Music

Following the release of the single "Into the Flames", Soul Fire came out on the independent label Via Music on 10 May 2004. Musically, the album was a mix of pop and electronic music with Bengali song, Norwegian folk music and no:wikt:kveding.

Toyomasu hoped for the album to surprise the listeners, and maybe contribute to spiritual awakening in the individual. She wanted to shift the common focus "from the materialist to the spiritual". In 2004, she told NRK that she believed angels helped her in creating her music.

=== Reception ===
Most critics rated the album as medium-to-positive, issuing a dice throw of 4 out of 6. Among the largest newspapers to give the grade 4 was Aftenposten, calling the "ethno-inspired and synth-based" pop music "sophisticated" and "original". The crossroads between "Asian, modern drum beats and somewhat classical" was "fascinating", but not all songs were equally fulfilled. The latter point was also raised by others. "It all goes somewhat to sleep, in its strangeness and originality"; at times the album came to a "standstill", wrote two critics though the overall grade was still 4.

Varden stated that most of the record demanded time and concentration from the listener, but nonetheless sounded similar after a while. The same critique was voiced by Fredriksstad Blad. Several of critics who rated it as 4/6, noted a similarity to the ethno-pop music of Bel Canto, with Toyomasu even having a similar voice to Anneli Drecker at times. However, Toyomasu also had a distinct "ethnic crack" in her voice. Another critic called her voice "good, powerful and pleasant". "Good", "powerful and special" were also used to characterize her voice in Smaalenenes Avis, among the very few outlets that gave the album a 5/6 grading.

Few of the positive critics commented the lyrics; Exact magazine wrote that "the lyrical universe contains plenty of symbolicism, fantasy, air and emotions". The reviewer commended the album for being personal, at the same time as a couple of missteps might not be made the next time Toyomasu entered a studio. Vårt Land called some of the lyrics "floating and contourless".

A number of critics also rated the album much lower, at 2 out of 6. VG opined that Toyomasu had an "OK" voice that "does not stand out in any kind of way", and lambasted the album as "boring", not "very successful", "with pretty advanced, but unfulfilled and uninteresting tunes, that don't contain any of the qualities needed to intrigue the listener". Bernt Erik Pedersen in Dagsavisen saw similarities to Bel Canto, claiming that the world pop was less spectacular in 2004 than in the 1990s. Pedersen also called some of the lyrics "bordering on pure nonsense".

One reviewer giving a dice throw of 3 reiterated the critique about being similar to Bel Canto. Wrote the reviewer, Toyomasu was "fifteen years late". The album was also a "dam that bursts" because too many ideas were packed into one effort. The modern and electronic elements made the album "overly synthetic", wrote Trønder-Avisa, issuing another 3/6 accompanied by "a polite yawn".

Adresseavisen called Soul Fire an offering of pop music that was not "pop enough"; "long-winded", "mediocre" and "ordinary", the songs having been "ground to tedium". The Østlendingen reviewer got "no impressions" from the record, and foresaw that "this album will not break through at all, and will be completely overlooked".
