= Karl Andreas Larsen Vefring =

Norwegian politician

Karl Andreas Larsen Vefring (1822 - 1895) was a Norwegian politician.

He was elected to the Norwegian Parliament in 1865, representing the constituency of Nordre Bergenhus Amt. He worked as a farmer there. He was re-elected in 1871 and 1877.
