= Jørgen Bjørnstad =

Norwegian gymnast (1894–1942)

- Born: 2 April 1894 Kristiania, United Kingdoms of Sweden and Norway
- Died: 10 July 1942 (aged 48) Oslo, Norway

Gymnastics career
- Discipline: Men's artistic gymnastics
- Country represented: Norway
- Club: Chistiania Turnforening
Medal record
Men's artistic gymnastics
Representing Norway
Olympic Games
Silver medal – second place	1920 Antwerp	Team, free system

Jørgen Bjørnstad (2 April 1894 – 10 July 1942) was a Norwegian gymnast who competed in the 1920 Summer Olympics. He was part of the Norwegian team, which won the gold medal in the gymnastics men's team, free system event.
