= Bodø affair =

Diplomatic incident between Sweden-Norway and the United Kingdom from 1818 to 1821

Coordinates: 67°17′15″N 14°22′09″E

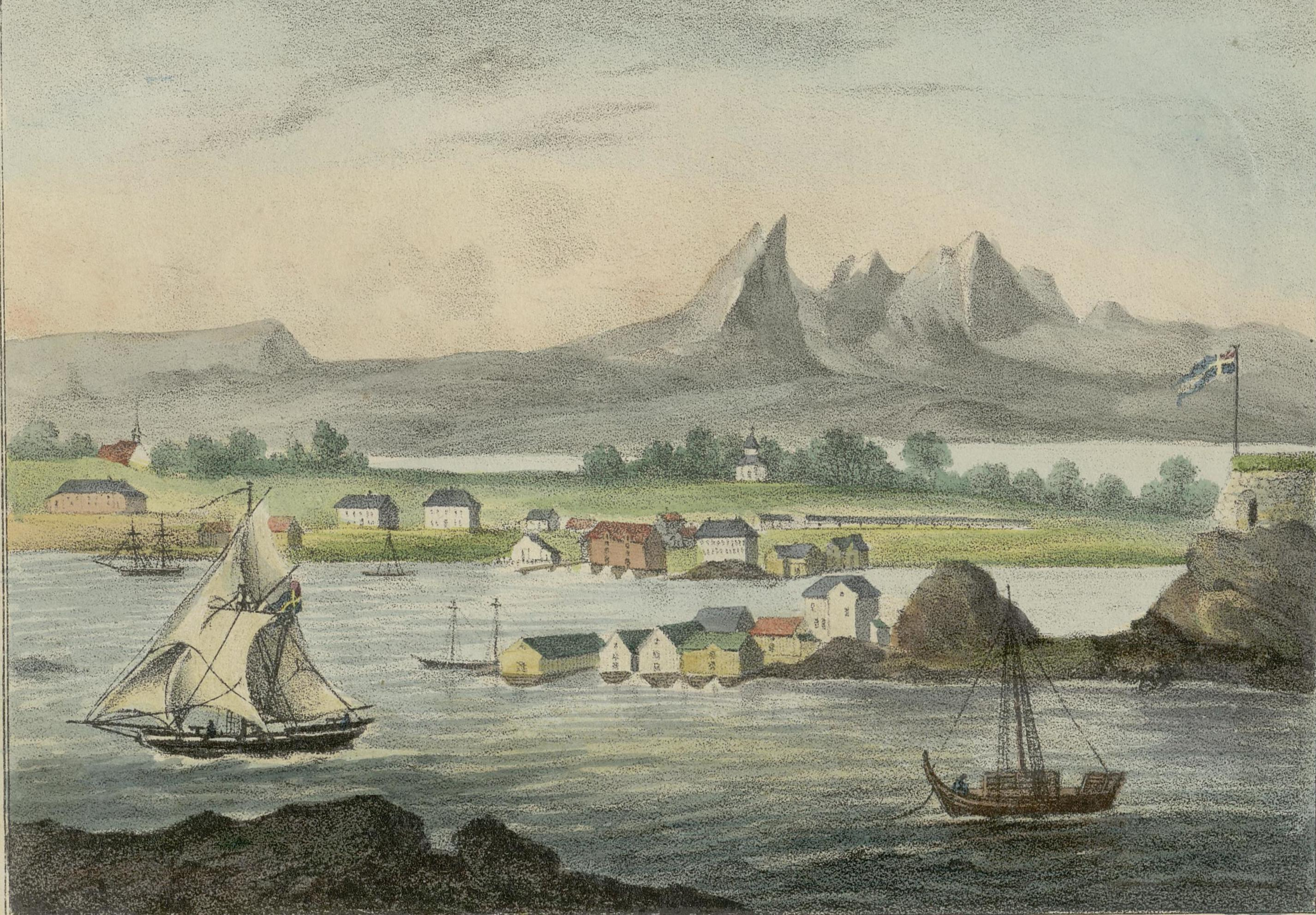
Lithograph of Bodø in the early 1800s by Peter Frederik Wergmann

The Bodø affair was a diplomatic scandal involving Sweden-Norway (then a dual monarchy) and the United Kingdom, which lasted from 1818 to 1821. The affair arose over the illegal trading activities of an English company in the Norwegian port of Bodø, where Norwegian officials in 1818 seized a large cargo of contraband belonging to the company and arrested one of its owners, who had attempted to smuggle it into Norway. He later with violence managed to escape. The Stockholm foreign ministry, which handled the foreign affairs of Norway at that time, seemed unreasonably favorable to British claims over the Bodø incident, thereby angering Norwegians and arousing their nationalism. In 1821 a large (for the Norwegian state) compensation was paid, over Norwegian objections, to another British company which had falsified documents regarding ownership of the goods. While of minor importance in itself, the incident led to lasting distrust among Norwegians of the Swedish foreign ministry.
