= Rolf Palmstrøm =

Norwegian Army officer (1893–1975)

- Born: 19 August 1893; Leirsund, Norway
- Died: 23 June 1975 (aged 81)
- Occupation: Military officer

Rolf Palmstrøm (19 August 1893 – 23 June 1975) was a Norwegian Army officer.

== Career ==
During the World War II, Palmstrøm was chief of communications in Milorg in 1941 and was head of the signal corps of the Norwegian High Command in London starting in 1942. After the war, he served as General Inspector of the Norwegian Army Signal Corps. He was the first leader of the military institution Forsvarets fellessamband from 1954 to 1958.

He was decorated Knight, First Class of the Order of St. Olav in 1946, and was Commander of the Swedish Order of Vasa.

== Personal life ==
Palmstrøm was born in Leirsund to accountant Ole Palmstrøm and Constance Bugge, and married Signe Sandok in 1918.

He died in 1975 and is buried at Ullern.
