= Ingolf Davidsen =

Norwegian artistic gymnast (1893–1946)

- Full name: Ingolf Martin Davidsen
- Born: 30 January 1893 Bergen, United Kingdoms of Sweden and Norway
- Died: 23 March 1946 (aged 53) Bergen, Norway

Gymnastics career
- Discipline: Men's artistic gymnastics
- Country represented: Norway
- Gym: Bergens Turnforening
Medal record
Men's artistic gymnastics
Representing Norway
Olympic Games
Silver medal – second place	1920 Antwerp	Team, free system

Ingolf Martin Davidsen (30 January 1893 – 23 March 1946) was a Norwegian gymnast who competed in the 1920 Summer Olympics. He was part of the Norwegian team, which won the gold medal in the gymnastics men's team, free system event.
