= Reidar Dahl =

Norwegian jurist and sports official (1893–1977)

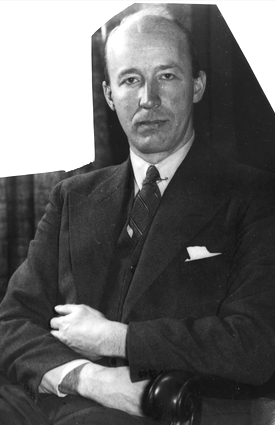
- Dahl c. 1935
- Born: 27 October 1893; Halden, Norway
- Died: 24 November 1977 (aged 84)
- Occupation: Sports administrator
- Organisation: Football Association of Norway

Reidar Dahl (27 October 1893 – 24 November 1977) was a Norwegian jurist and sports official.

== Biography ==
Dahl was born in Halden on 27 October 1893, a son of factory owner Ole Dahl and Sofie Hjerperød. He married Else Syberg in 1920.

He chaired the sports club SFK Lyn in 1927 and 1930, and served as president of the Football Association of Norway from 1936 to 1949, and from 1953 to 1955. He was decorated Knight of the Order of the Polar Star, and was an honorary member of the Norwegian Actors' Equity Association.

He died on 24 November 1977.

Sporting positions
Preceded by Bjarne Gulbrandsen	President of the Football Association of Norway; 1936–1941, 1945–1949	Succeeded by Harald Evensen
Preceded by Harald Evensen	President of the Football Association of Norway; 1953–1955	Succeeded by Aksel W. Floer
