= Reidar Tønsberg =

Norwegian artistic gymnast

- Full name: Reidar Samuel Tønsberg
- Born: 23 March 1893 Kristiania, United Kingdoms of Sweden and Norway
- Died: 12 March 1956 (aged 62) Oslo, Norway

Gymnastics career
- Discipline: Men's artistic gymnastics
- Country represented: Norway
- Club: Chistiania Turnforening
Medal record
Men's artistic gymnastics
Representing Norway
Olympic Games
Silver medal – second place	1920 Antwerp	Team, free system

Reidar Samuel Tønsberg (23 March 1893 – 12 March 1956) was a Norwegian gymnast who competed in the 1920 Summer Olympics. He was part of the Norwegian team, which won the gold medal in the gymnastics men's team, free system event.

He was also Norwegian gymnastics' champion in the years 1921, 1923 and 1924.
