= Job Dischington Bødtker =

Norwegian politician

Job Dischington Bødtker (9 August 1818 – 12 November 1889) was a Norwegian jurist and politician.

He resided in Tønsberg, where he worked as stipendiary magistrate (byfoged). He was elected to the Norwegian Parliament in 1865, 1868, 1871 and 1874, representing his city.

He was married to Fredrikke Sophie Sejersted (1825–1892). One of his daughters, Frederikke Dorothea (1853–1919), married to-be Prime Minister of Norway Francis Hagerup.
