= Håkon Endreson =

Norwegian gymnast

- Full name: Håkon Riofe Endreson
- Born: 16 February 1891 Vestre Aker, United Kingdoms of Sweden and Norway
- Died: 18 March 1970 (aged 79) Bærum, Norway

Gymnastics career
- Discipline: Men's artistic gymnastics
- Country represented: Norway
- Gym: Chistiania Turnforening
Medal record
Men's artistic gymnastics
Representing Norway
Olympic Games
Silver medal – second place	1920 Antwerp	Team, free system

Håkon Riofe Endreson (16 February 1891 – 18 March 1970) was a Norwegian gymnast who competed in the 1920 Summer Olympics. He was part of the Norwegian team, which won the gold medal in the gymnastics men's team, free system event.
