= Axel Winge =

Norwegian businessperson and politician

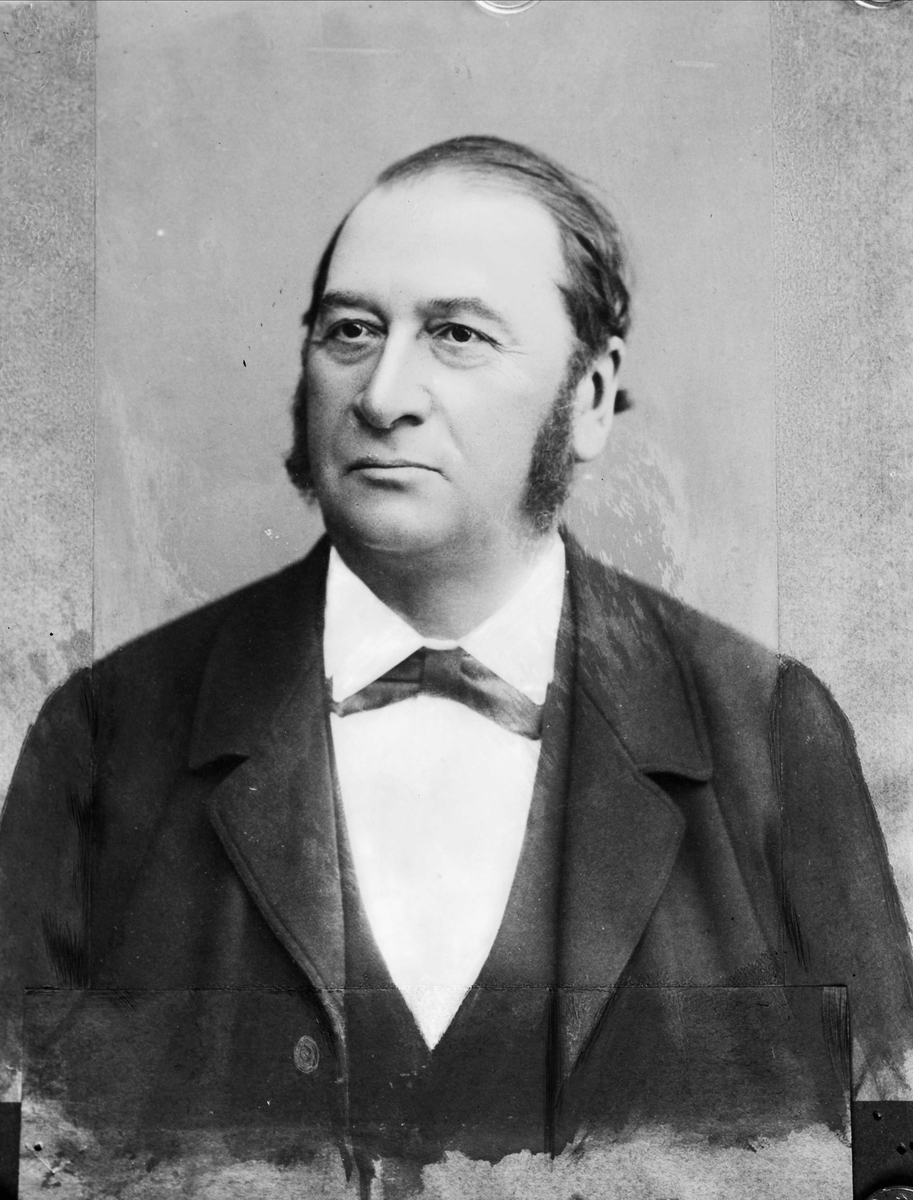
Axel Winge

Axel Winge (21 May 1827 – 19 December 1893) was a Norwegian businessperson and politician for the Conservative Party.

He was born in Christiania (now Oslo) as the son of Paul Claussøn Winge and Anna Jakobine Gandil. In 1857 he married Elisabeth Marie "Betzy" Lasson, and they had the son Per Winge.

He was elected to the Norwegian Parliament in 1889, representing the constituency of Kristiania, Hønefoss og Kongsvinger. He served only one term. He was a commissioner at Kristiania Stock Exchange as well as consul at that time.
