= Johan Lauritz Eidem =

Norwegian politician

Johan Lauritz Eidem (9 September 1891 – 6 July 1984) was a Norwegian politician for the Liberal Party.

He served as a deputy representative to the Norwegian Parliament from Møre og Romsdal during the term 1950–1953.
