= Johannes Heimbeck =

Norwegian physician and hospital director

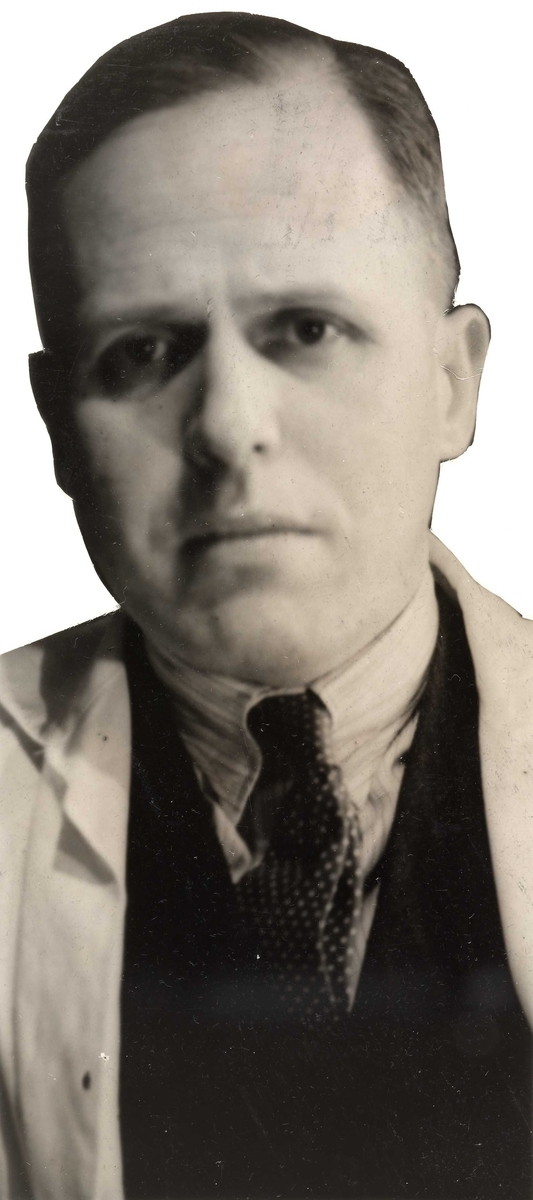
- Johannes Heimbeck ca. 1930
- Born: 30 May 1892; Kristiania, Norway
- Died: 24 September 1976 (aged 84)
- Education: University of Oslo
- Occupation: physician

Johannes Heimbeck (30 May 1892 – 24 September 1976) was a Norwegian physician and hospital director.

== Biography ==
He was born in Kristiania (now Oslo), Norway. He was the son of Louise Christopha Blom (1851–1938) and Johannes Marius Heimbeck (1848–1910). He graduated artium from Aars og Voss skole in 1910. He became a cand.med. at the University of Oslo in 1917.

He received further education at Rikshospitalet and Ullevål Hospital. He continued as assistant physician at the Oslo Health Council's Tuberculosis Department from 1931 to 1936. He chaired the Norwegian Red Cross Hospital in Oslo from 1936 to 1967. He is particularly known for introducing the BCG vaccination program against tuberculosis from 1926.

Heimbeck was a resistance pioneer, active during the first years of the occupation of Norway by Nazi Germany.
