= Christian Astrup =

Norwegian politician and economist

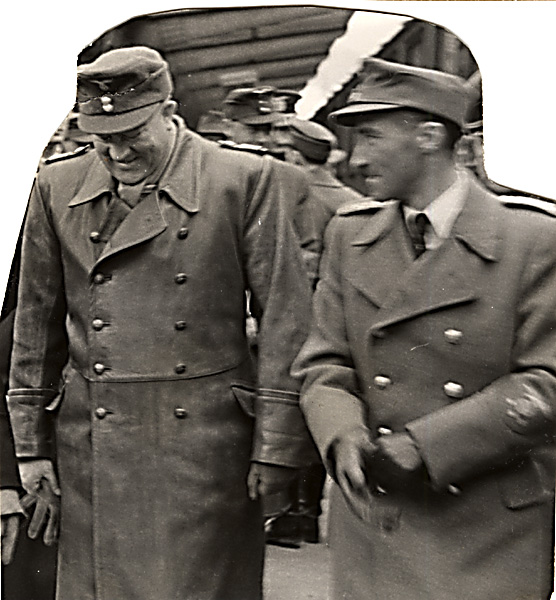
- Astrup (right) with Vidkun Quisling
- Born: 1909; Solør, Norway
- Died: 1983 (aged 73–74)
- Occupations: Economist, forester and politician

Christian Astrup (1909–1983) was a Norwegian economist, forester and politician for Nasjonal Samling.

Astrup was born in Solør. From October 1944 he served as acting Minister of Social Affairs in the Quisling regime, the puppet government headed by Vidkun Quisling during the German occupation of Norway, while Johan Andreas Lippestad was absent as responsible for the evacuation of Finnmark. Astrup was sentenced to eight years forced labor in the legal purge in Norway after World War II.
