= Tolv Aamland =

Norwegian politician (1893–1983)

Tolv Aamland (21 January 1893 – 10 December 1983) was a Norwegian politician for the Liberal Party.

He served as a deputy representative to the Parliament of Norway from Aust-Agder during the term 1945–1949. In total he met during ten days of parliamentary session.

Hailing from Birkenes Municipality, he was a school principal in his professional life. During the occupation of Norway by Nazi Germany, he was imprisoned in Arkivet in May 1942.
