= Ludvig Ellefsrød =

Norwegian politician

Ludvig Ellefsrød (29 September 1894 - 3 January 1983) was a Norwegian politician for the Conservative Party.

He served as a deputy representative to the Norwegian Parliament from Rogaland during the terms 1950–1953, 1954–1957 and 1958–1961.
