= Lars Kristiansen Blilie =

Norwegian politician

Lars Kristiansen Blilie (5 April 1820 – 17 December 1892) was a Norwegian farmer and politician for the Liberal Party.

He worked as a farmer in the traditional region of Toten in Oppland, Norway. He was also involved in local politics, serving as mayor of Vestre Toten Municipality from 1866 to 1871.

He was elected to the Norwegian Parliament in 1871, representing the constituency of Kristians Amt. He was re-elected in 1874, 1880 and 1883.

His son Mathias Larsen Blilie followed in his footsteps, becoming both mayor and a member of Parliament.
