= Otto Huseklepp =

Norwegian politician

Otto Huseklepp (2 April 1892 – 31 July 1964) was a Norwegian politician for the Liberal Party.

He was born in Guddalen.

He served as a deputy representative to the Norwegian Parliament from Sogn og Fjordane during the terms 1945–1949 and 1950–1953. He was also a member of the municipal council of Førde Municipality.

== See also ==
- Politics of Norway
