= Finn Bjørnseth (geodesist) =

Norwegian geodesist and military officer

- Born: 5 February 1892; Kristiania, Norway
- Died: 5 May 1970 (aged 78)
- Education: Norwegian Military College; University of Oslo
- Occupations: Geodesist and military officer

Finn Bjørnseth (5 February 1892 – 5 May 1970) was a Norwegian geodesist and a military officer.

== Personal life ==
Bjørnseth was born in Kristiania (now Oslo), a son of the colonel Johan Hagbarth Bjørnseth and Fanny Augusta Larsen. In 1920, he married Mathilde Michelsen.

== Career ==
Bjørnseth graduated from the Norwegian Military College in 1915. He also graduated in astronomy from the University of Oslo in 1923, and further studied geodesy and related subjects in France and Switzerland from 1927 to 1928. He worked as geodesist for the Norwegian Mapping and Cadastre Authority from 1918 to 1939. Onwards, from 1939 to 1959, he assumed administrative positions in the municipalities of Aker and Oslo, and also worked in 1952 as the head of surveying in Oslo.

Bjørnseth engaged in organizational work where he chaired Norsk kartografisk forening, was a member of Norges geografiske komite, and chaired Standards Norway's committee for map symbolization.

Bjørnseth died on 5 May 1970.
