= Henriette Homann =

Norwegian photographer and painter (1819–1892)

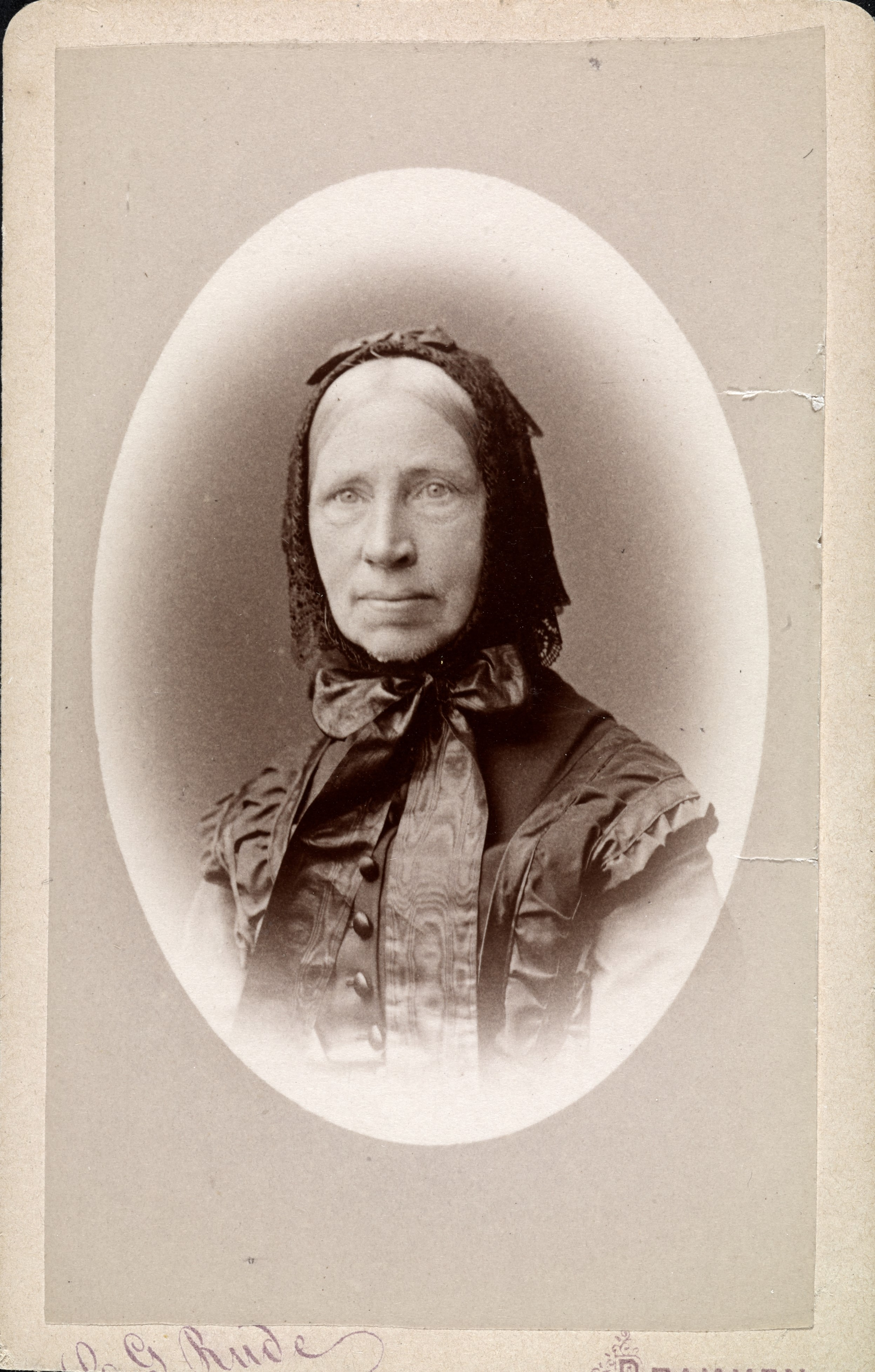
- Henriette Homann in c. 1890
- Born: Henriette Olava Homann; 3 January 1819; Kragerø, Telemark, Norway
- Died: 11 February 1892 (aged 73); Christiania, Norway
- Other names: Jette Homann, Henriette Homann the Elder
- Occupations: Photographer, painter

Henriette Olava "Jette" Homann (3 January 1819 – 11 February 1892) was a Norwegian photographer and painter. She was one of the first female photographers in Norway.

== Early life ==
Henriette Olava Homann was born on 3 January 1819 in Kragerø to doctor Christian Horrebow Homann (1786–1860) and Boel Catherine Biørn. Homann is sometimes referred to as Henriette Homann the Elder or Jette Homann to distinguish her from her niece, Henriette Homann the Younger, who later inherited her photographic equipment, books and negatives.

== Career ==
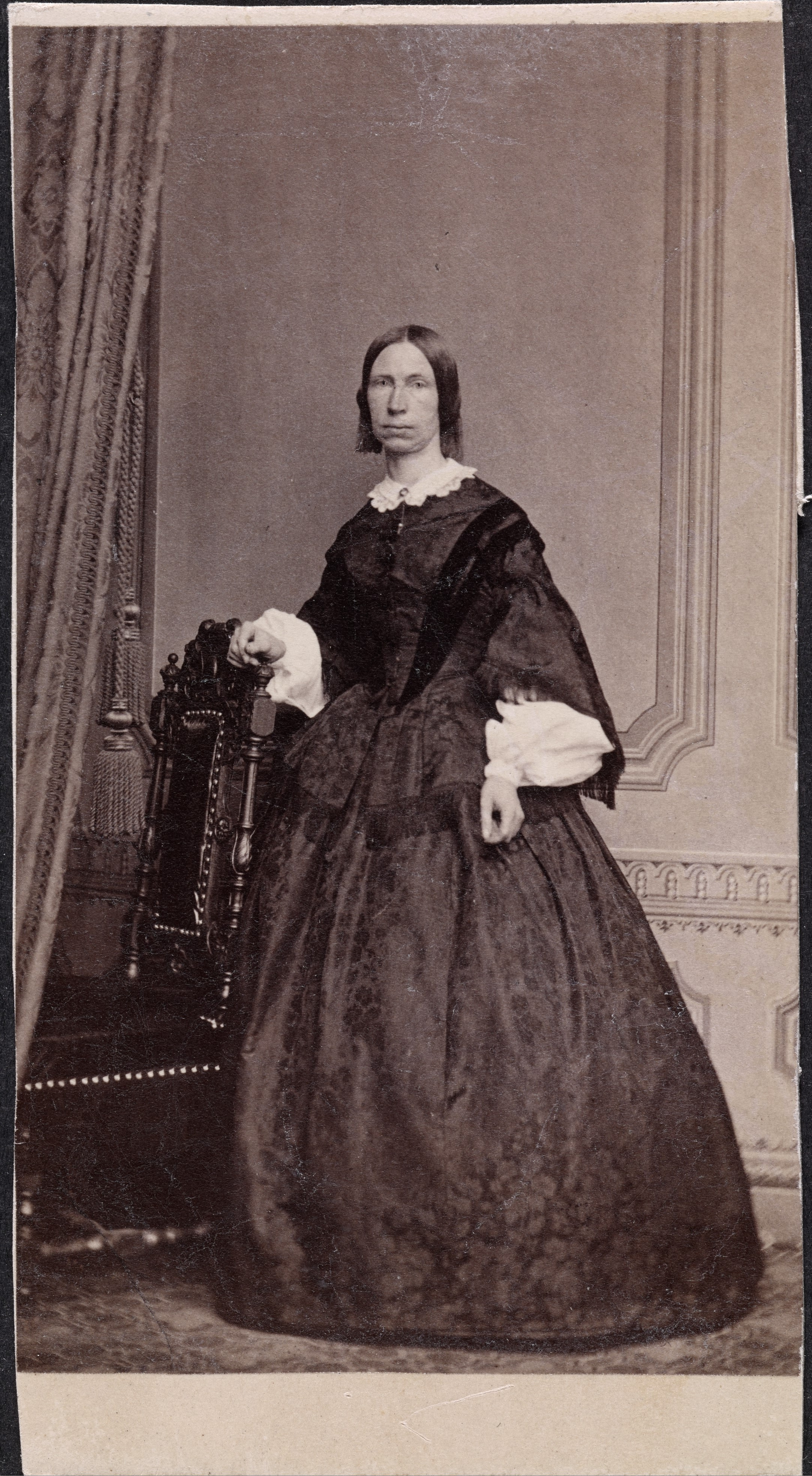
Henriette "Jette" Homann by Carl Joh. Hanssen taken c. 1860

Between 1843 and 1844, Homann was a pupil of Johan Gørbitz, who had previously painted her father's portrait, and trained as a portrait painter. Homann later specialised in drawn portraits. Among her subjects was her mother Boel, her brother-in-law Anton Martin Schweigaard and her brother Peter Jacob Homann. She also painted oil sketches in the style of Adolph Tidemand.

In Christiania, she had a studio in Karl Johans gate, where she also worked with Daguerreotype photography, which her teacher Gørbitz had begun working with in 1845. Homann's oldest photograph is dated 1851.

In 1866, she returned to Kragerø, where she devoted herself to looking after the house and children of her brother Christian Horrebow Homann the Younger.

== Death and legacy ==
Homann died on 11 February 1892 in Christiania, at the age of 73. Her funeral took place nine days later on 20 February.

Around 100 of her drawings and paintings are held at the Berg-Kragerø Museum, as well as several of her photographs and property. They were bequeathed to the museum by her niece Henriette Homann the Younger in 1943.
