= Elise Fliflet =

Norwegian politician

Elise Gabrielle Fliflet (30 March 1893 – 31 December 1991) was a Norwegian politician for the Conservative Party.

She served as a deputy representative to the Norwegian Parliament from the Market towns of Hedmark and Oppland counties during the term 1945–1949.

She hailed from Gjøvik, and worked as a school teacher.
