= Halldis Stenhamar =

Norwegian journalist (1894–1983)

- Born: 2 March 1894; Drammen, Norway
- Died: 14 October 1983 (aged 89); Oslo
- Occupation: Journalist
- Employer(s): Nidaros, Norske Intelligenssedler, Verdens Gang, Dagbladet

Halldis Stenhamar (2 March 1894 – 14 October 1983) was a Norwegian journalist who was active for over fifty years and a pioneer in reporting on social issues.

== Personal life ==
Stenhamar was born in Drammen on 2 March 1894, to schoolteacher and editor Hans August Steinhamar and teacher and journalist Anna Jørgine Christophersen. Both her parents were newspaper people, and they issued the newspaper Oplandsposten in Hønefoss between 1900 and 1905.

In 1923, Stenhamar had a son with newspaper editor and eventual theatre director Axel Otto Normann, but they never married. She raised her son as a single mother and did not reveal the father's name until the boy was twelve years old.

== Career ==
After passing her examen artium in Drammen in 1913, Stenhamar worked as a journalist trainee at the Drammen newspapers Nye Luren and Hallingen. She was assigned to the newspaper Nidaros in Trondheim from 1915 to 1918. From 1917 to 1920 she was a journalist for Norske Intelligenssedler, and from 1920 to 1923, for Verdens Gang. From 1923 to 1964, she was assigned as a journalist for the newspaper Dagbladet. Writing articles signed with the signature "Hast", she was a pioneer in reporting on social issues.

In 1928, she published a biography of Katti Anker Møller, and in 1930 she translated Bertrand Russell's book Marriage and Morals into Norwegian language.

She was the first female board member of the Trondheim chapter of the Norwegian Press Association, in 1918 and 1919. She was a deputy representative to the central board of the association for many years, as well as a deputy member of the board of the Norwegian Union of Journalists.
