= Hans Henrik Wærenskjold =

Norwegian politician

Hans Henrik Wærenskjold (12 August 1820 – 28 March 1909) was a Norwegian politician.

He was elected to the Norwegian Parliament in 1851, representing the constituency of Holmestrand. He worked as a baker and shop keeper there.

He was born in Tønsberg, and died in Sandstad. He married Olava Lauretiusdatter Falkenberg from Tønsberg in 1841, and the couple had several children.
