= Rolf Olsen (Norwegian politician) =

Norwegian politician and playwright

Rolf Olsen (13 February 1818 – 7 June 1864) was a Norwegian politician and playwright.

== Biography ==
Rolf Olsen was born in Bergen, Norway. He was the son of Andreas Schram Olsen (1791–1841), the bailiff (byfogd) of Bergen. He was a student in Skien and earned a Candidatus juris in 1842. In 1846, he was employed as a clerk in the Interior Ministry until 1852. He also worked as a journalist, especially for Morgenbladet, where he was an editor from 1848. Between 1840 and 1850, he wrote several plays including both tragedies and comedies.

He was elected to the Norwegian Parliament in 1854, 1857, 1859 and 1862, representing the constituency of Østerrisøer in Nedenes county, Norway. In 1863, he was appointed as a judge in Gauldalen, but died the following year.

== Selected works ==
- Den sidste viking (1840)
- Salonen eller Intrigen i Kræmmerhuset (1848)
- Kontrolløren, eller Eventyr paa Landet (1849)
- Tolvte ordentlige Storting (1850)
