= Diderik Iversen Tønseth =

Norwegian politician

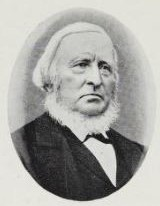
Diderik Iversen Portrait

Diderik Iversen Tønseth (24 September 1818 – 12 January 1893) was a Norwegian politician for the Liberal Party.

He was elected to the Norwegian Parliament in 1862, representing the constituency of Søndre Trondhjems Amt. He worked as a teacher there. He was later elected in 1868, 1871, 1874, 1877, 1880 and 1883.
