= Kristen Gundelach =

Norwegian poet and translator (1891–1971)

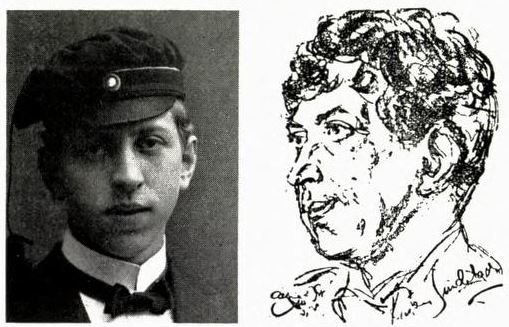
- Born: 20 September 1891; Kristiansund, Norway
- Died: 9 April 1971 (aged 79)
- Occupations: Poet; Translator

Kristen Gundelach (20 September 1891 – 9 April 1971) was a Norwegian poet and translator. He was born in Kristiansund. He made his literary debut in 1916 with the poetry collection Liv og lek. Among his other books are Ny vår from 1935, Legenden om livet from 1936, and Vingehest på langferd from 1966. He published a number of thrillers under various pseudonyms. He was a member of Nasjonal Samling, and was expelled from the Norwegian Authors' Union between 1945 and 1952.
