= Karl Lunde =

Norwegian politician

Karl Lunde (19 May 1892 - 11 June 1975) is a Norwegian politician for the Liberal Party.

He served as a deputy representative to the Norwegian Parliament from Troms during the terms 1950–1953 and 1954–1957.
