= 1898 in Norway =

- Centuries: 17th; 18th; 19th; 20th; 21st
- Decades: 1870s; 1880s; 1890s; 1900s; 1910s
- See also: 1898 in Sweden; List of years in Norway

Events in the year 1898 in Norway.

== Incumbents ==
- Monarch – Oscar II.
- Prime Minister: Francis Hagerup (until 17 February), then Johannes Steen

== Events ==
- 12 January – The National Association for Women's Suffrage is founded by Gina Krog and Hagbard Emanuel Berner.
- 31 May – A/S Holmenkolbanen open the Holmenkollen Line to Besserud
- 1 June – HNoMS Storm is launched, one of the oldest ships still in front line service in the Second World War

== Popular culture ==
=== Sports ===
- 28 February – Melhus IL sports club is founded in Melhus Municipality
- 14 September – Nordal Church in Norddalsfjord is consecrated
- 27 September – Snillfjord Church is consecrated by Johannes Skaar
- 30 December – Stryn TIL sports club is founded in Stryn Municipality

=== Music ===
- 26 June – Edvard Grieg holds Norway's first music festival in Bergen
- Olaus Alvestad publishes the songbook Norsk Songbok for Ungdomsskular og Ungdomslag

=== Literature ===
- 24 January – Daily newspaper Bladet Tromsø is first printed in Tromsø
- August The longest running Northern Sami newspaper, Nuorttanaste, is first printed in Bodø
- The political newspapers Budstikka and Søndfjords Avis are founded

== Notable births ==
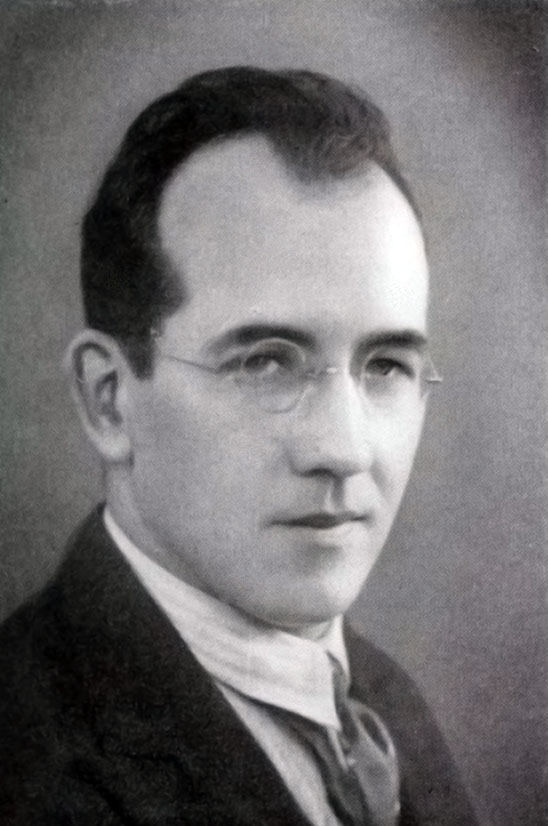
Rolf Hofmo

- 12 January – Jacob Erstad, gymnast (died 1963)
- 19 January – Harald Økern, Nordic combined skier (died 1977)
- 25 January – Sveinung O. Flaaten, politician (died 1962)
- 1 February – Roald Larsen, speed skater and Olympic silver medallist (died 1959)
- 13 February – Albert Andreas Mørkved, politician (died 1990)
- 19 February – Arnold Carl Johansen, politician (died 1957)
- 2 March – Erling Aastad, long jumper and sprinter (died 1963)
- 2 March – Nils Thune, politician (died 1988)
- 8 March – Per Almaas, politician (died 1991)
- 8 March – Per Næsset, politician (died 1970)
- 25 March – Einar Landvik, Nordic skier (died 1993)
- 31 March – Tora Øyna, politician (died 1991)
- 7 April – Jacob Tullin Thams, skier (died 1954)
- 17 April – Birger Grønn, engineer and resistance member (died 1988).
- 20 April – Johan Johannesen, track and field athlete (died 1979)
- 8 May – Erling Gjone, architect (died 1990).
- 18 May – Einar Stang, painter and illustrator (died 1984).
- 19 May – Bjart Ording, horse rider and Olympic silver medallist (died 1975)
- 14 June – Kristian Alfred Hammer, politician (died 1965)
- 19 June – Olav Dalgard, filmmaker and literature and art historian (died 1980)
- 24 June – Bjarne Støtvig, politician (died 1982)
- 25 June – Anders Lundgren, sailor and Olympic gold medallist (died 1964)
- 26 June – Ole Reistad, military officer and pentathlete (died 1949)
- 3 July – Kristian Rønneberg, politician (died 1982)
- 9 July – Johannes S. Andersen, resistance fighter (died 1968)
- 1 August – Sverre Steen, historian (died 1983).
- 5 August – Reidar Magnus Aamo, politician (died 1972)
- 10 August – Ivar Kornelius Eikrem, politician (died 1994)
- 10 August – Rolf Hofmo, politician and sports official (died 1966)
- 23 August – Sigrid Boo, novelist (died 1953)
- 27 August – Carl Otto Løvenskiold, businessperson (died 1969)
- 15 September – Bjørn Hougen, archaeologist (died 1976)
- 19 September – Erik Rotheim, chemical engineer and inventor of the aerosol spray can (died 1938)
- 2 October – Trond Hegna, journalist and politician (died 1992)
- 18 October – John Ditlev-Simonsen, sailor and Olympic silver medallist (died 1967)
- 22 October – Inge Lyse, engineer and resistance member (died 1990)
- 22 October – Bjørn Skjærpe, gymnast and Olympic silver medallist
- 20 November – Einar Stavang, politician (died 1992)
- 29 November – Aagot Børseth, actor (died 1993)
- 2 December – Henry Jacobsen, politician (died 1964)
- 3 December – Asbjørn Halvorsen, international soccer player and general secretary of the Norwegian Football Association (died 1955)
- 4 December – Reimar Riefling, classical pianist, music teacher, and music critic (died 1981)
- 8 December –
  - Christopher Dahl, sailor and Olympic gold medallist (died 1966)
  - Aslak Nilsen, politician (died 1952).
- 29 December – Randi Anda, politician (died 1999)

=== Full date unknown ===
- Conrad Bonnevie-Svendsen, priest and politician (died 1983)
- Rolf Gammleng, violinist and organizational leader (died 1984).
- Sonja Hagemann, literary historian and literary critic (died 1983)
- Odd Hølaas, journalist and writer (died 1968)
- Sverre Munck, businessperson (died 1970)
- Rolf Østbye, businessperson (died 1979)
- Sverre Petterssen, meteorologist (died 1974)
- Leif J. Sverdrup, civil engineer and military officer in America (died 1976)

== Notable deaths ==
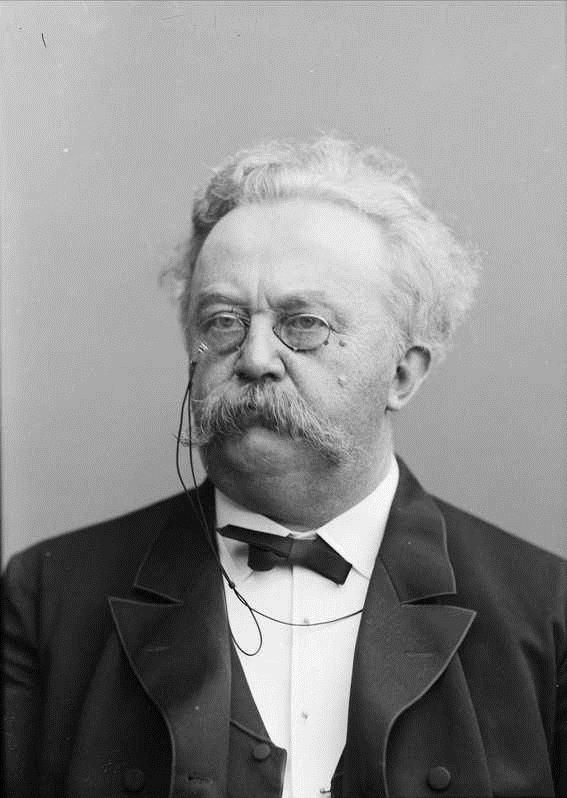
Hans Rasmus Astrup

- 5 January – Valdemar Knudsen, sugar cane plantation pioneer in Hawaii (born 1819)
- 2 February – Johan Christian Johnsen, politician (born 1815)
- 7 September – Karl Hals, businessperson and politician (born 1822)
- 11 September – Nikoline Harbitz, author (born 1841)

=== Full date unknown ===
- Hans Rasmus Astrup, politician (born 1831)
- Axel Gudbrand Blytt, botanist (born 1843)
- Laura Gundersen, actor (born 1832)
- Nils Pedersen Igland, farmer and politician (born 1833)
- Holm Hansen Munthe, architect (born 1848)
- Johan Jørgen Schwartz, politician and businessperson (born 1824)
