= 1970 in Norway =

- Centuries: 18th; 19th; 20th; 21st
- Decades: 1950s; 1960s; 1970s; 1980s; 1990s
- See also: List of years in Norway

Events in the year 1970 in Norway.

== Incumbents ==
- Monarch – Olav V.
- Prime Minister – Per Borten (Centre Party)

== Events ==
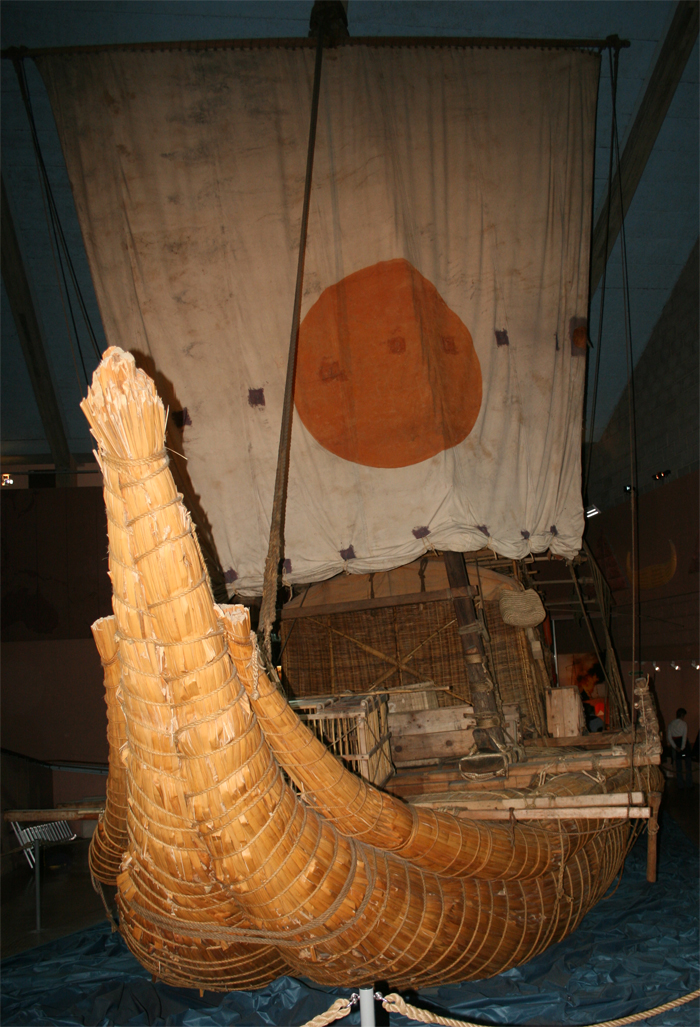
Thor Heyerdahl and his crew sets sail from Morocco for Latin America aboard Ra II

- 27 April – The oil company Phillips Petroleum makes a new oil discovery (Ekofisk oil field) in the North Sea. The Ekofisk oil field remains one of the most important oil fields in the North Sea.
- 7 May – Norway's Resistance Museum is opened to the public.
- 17 May – Thor Heyerdahl and his crew sets sail from Morocco towards Latin America aboard Ra II, a papyrus boat modeled after ancient Egyptian sailing vessels, in an attempt to cross the Atlantic Ocean and prove his theory that the ancient Egyptians sailed to America in ancient times.
- 19 June – The Nature Conservation Act (Naturvernlova) was adopted.
- 12 July – Ra II arrives in Barbados.
- 20 September – A volcano eruption occurs on Jan Mayen. As a result, the island is evacuated.
- 1 November – Population Census: 3,874,133 inhabitants in Norway.
- Kristiansund Airport, Kvernberget is opened for traffic

=== Literature ===
- Finn Carling, novelist, playwright, poet and essayist, is awarded the Riksmål Society Literature Prize.
- Simen Skjønsberg, journalist and writer, is awarded the Mads Wiel Nygaard's Endowment literary prize.

== Notable births ==
=== January to March ===
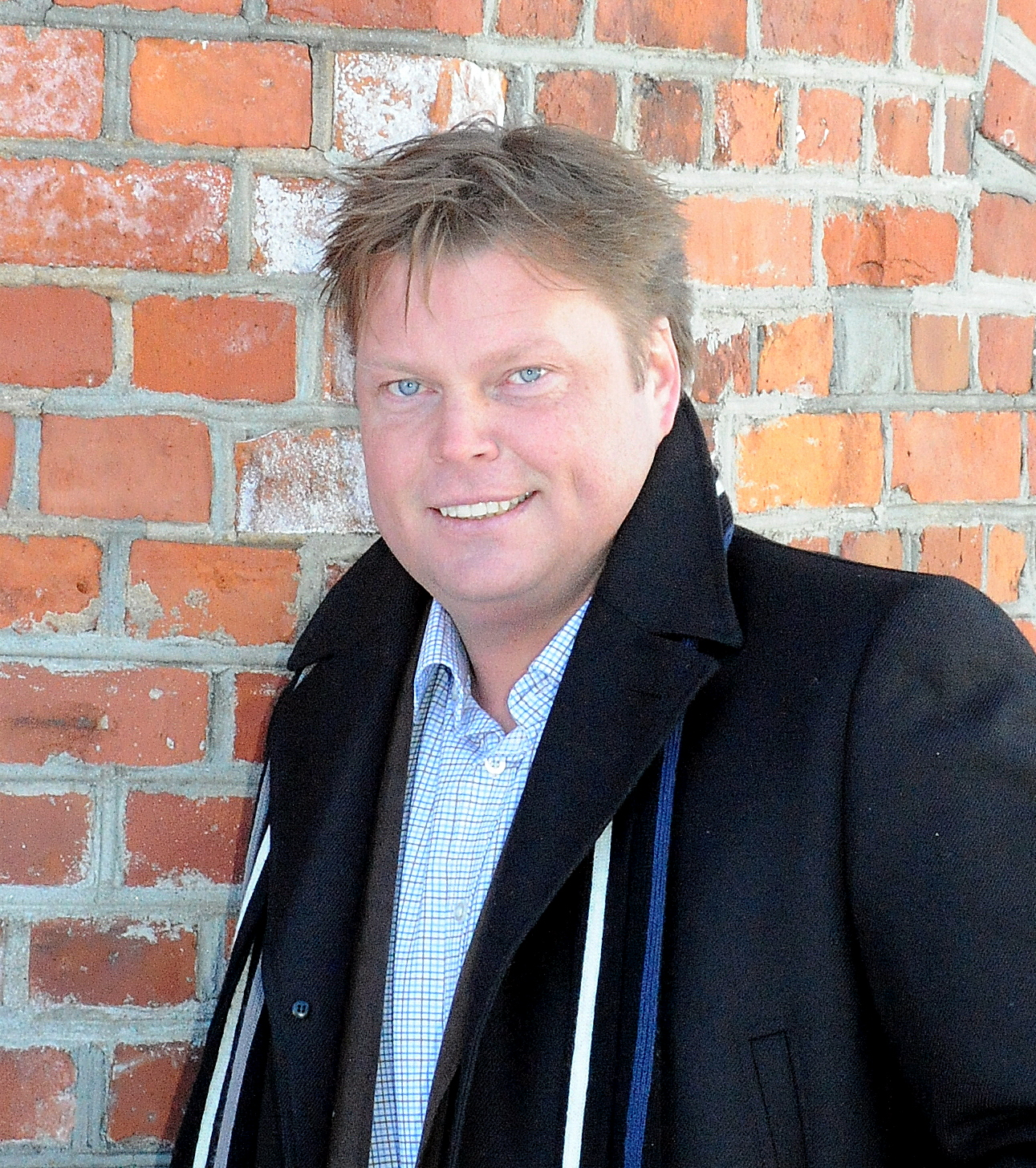
Jørn Lier Horst

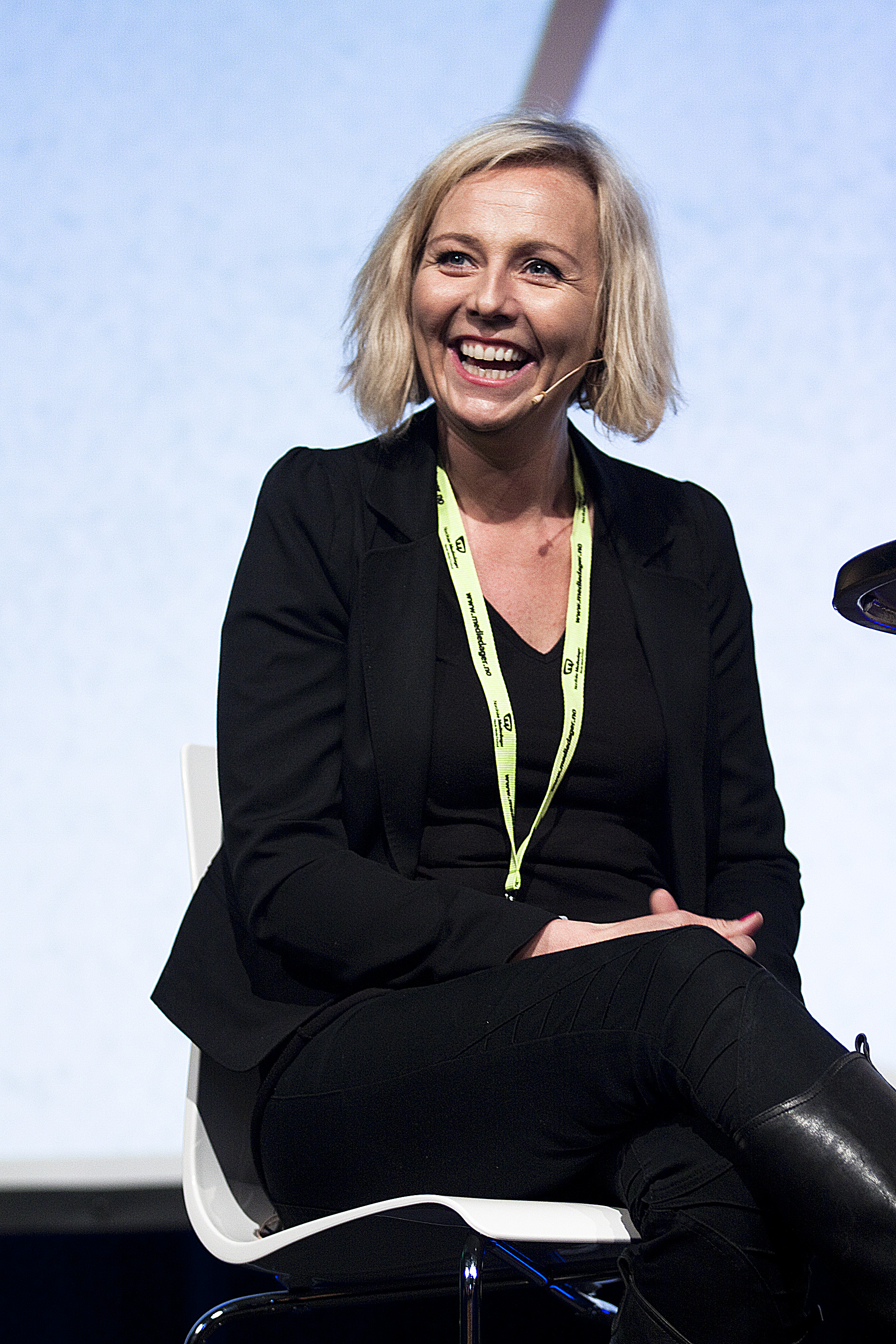
Linn Skåber

- 3 January – May Helen Hetland Ervik, politician.
- 4 January – Carl Frode Tiller, author
- 12 January – Line Johansen, sport wrestler.
- 15 January – Geir Tangen, crime novelist.
- 25 January – Rune Djurhuus, chess player.
- 25 January – Margunn Haugenes, footballer.
- 4 February – Nina Nilsen, sport wrestler.
- 2 February – Roar Strand, footballer.
- 6 February – Trine Lise Sundnes, politician and trade unionist.
- 9 February – Eldbjørg Raknes, jazz singer.
- 10 February – Åsne Seierstad, journalist and non-fiction writer.
- 13 February – Karoline Krüger, singer.
- 22 February – Jarl Inge Melberg, swimmer.
- 23 February – Heidi Marie Kriznik, novelist and organizational leader.
- 24 February – Bjarte Hjelmeland, actor.
- 27 February – Jørn Lier Horst, crime fiction writer.
- 4 March – Sara Johnsen, film director.
- 22 March – Gunhild Ørn, cyclist.
- 22 March – Live Maria Roggen, jazz singer.
- 30 March – Signe Trosten, biathlete.
- 31 March – Linn Skåber, actress, singer, comedian, text writer and TV personality.

=== April to June ===
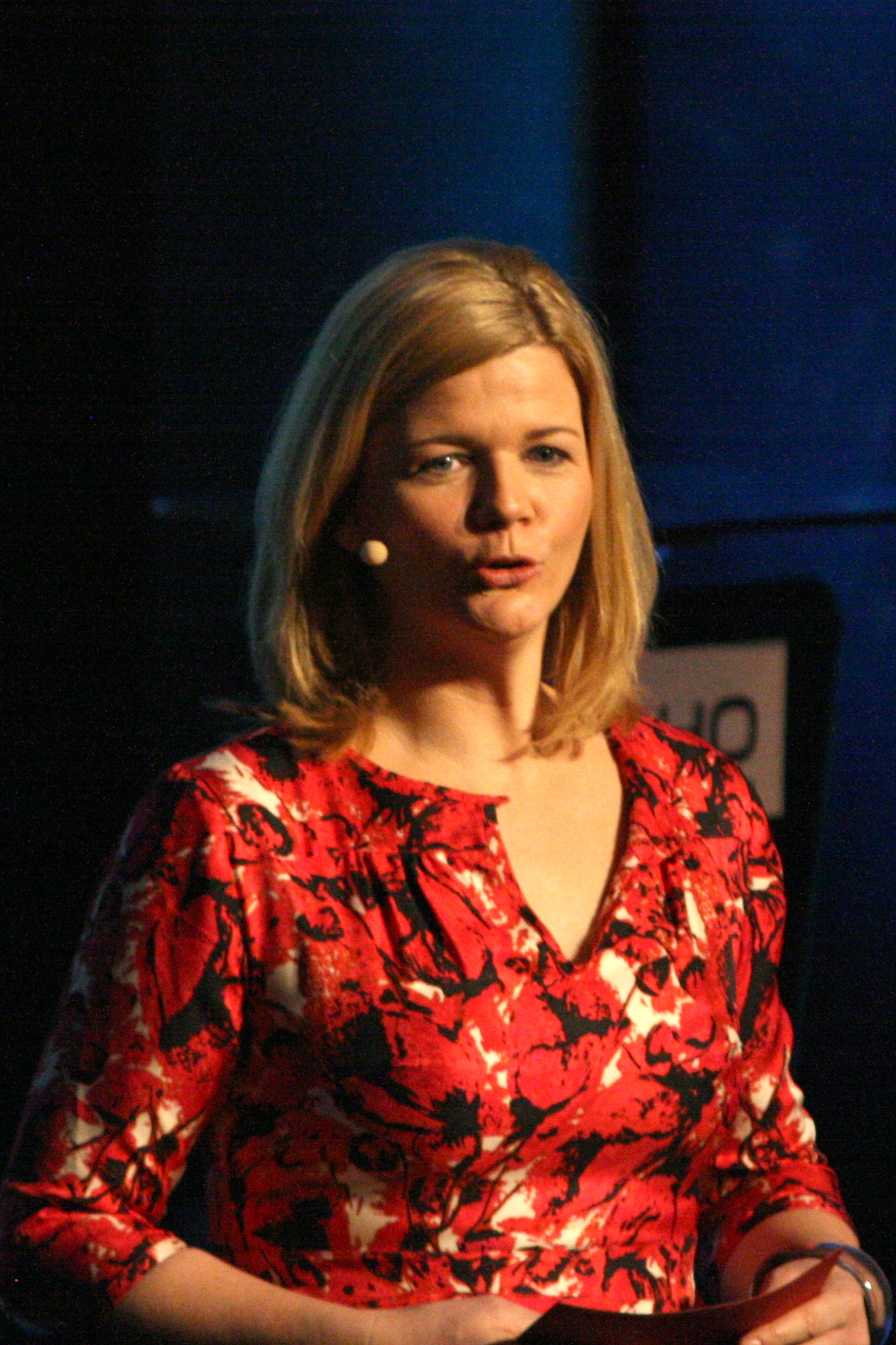
Anne Lindmo

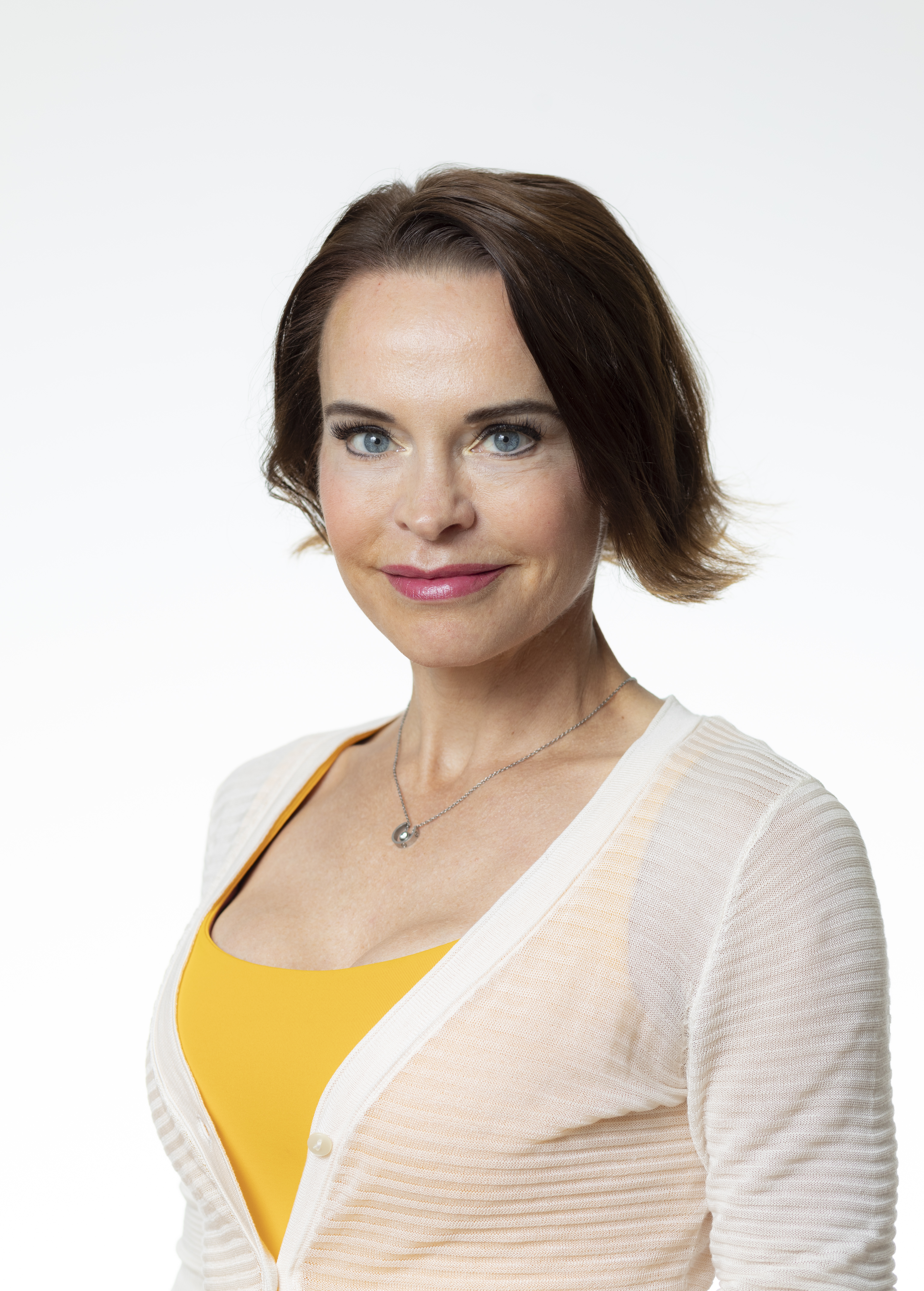
Maria Strømme

- 2 April – Anette Tønsberg, speed skater.
- 3 April – Anne Lindmo, journalist.
- 3 April – Torbjørn Rødland, photographer.
- 7 April – Leif Ove Andsnes, pianist.
- 7 April – Maria Strømme, physicist
- 8 April – Torill Eidsheim, politician.
- 16 April – Margreth Olin, film director.
- 25 April – Kjersti Stubø, jazz singer.
- 30 April – Hilde Sandvik, journalist.
- 16 May – Tom Selvik, sprint canoer.
- 19 May – Vidar Busk, guitarist.
- 27 May – Marius Rath, ice hockey player.
- 28 May – Gry Blekastad Almås, journalist and news anchor
- 11 June – Hilde Magnusson Lydvo, politician
- 12 June – Henriette Henriksen, handball player.
- 20 June – Karin Yrvin, politician.
- 23 June – Britt-Synnøve Johansen, singer.

=== July to September ===
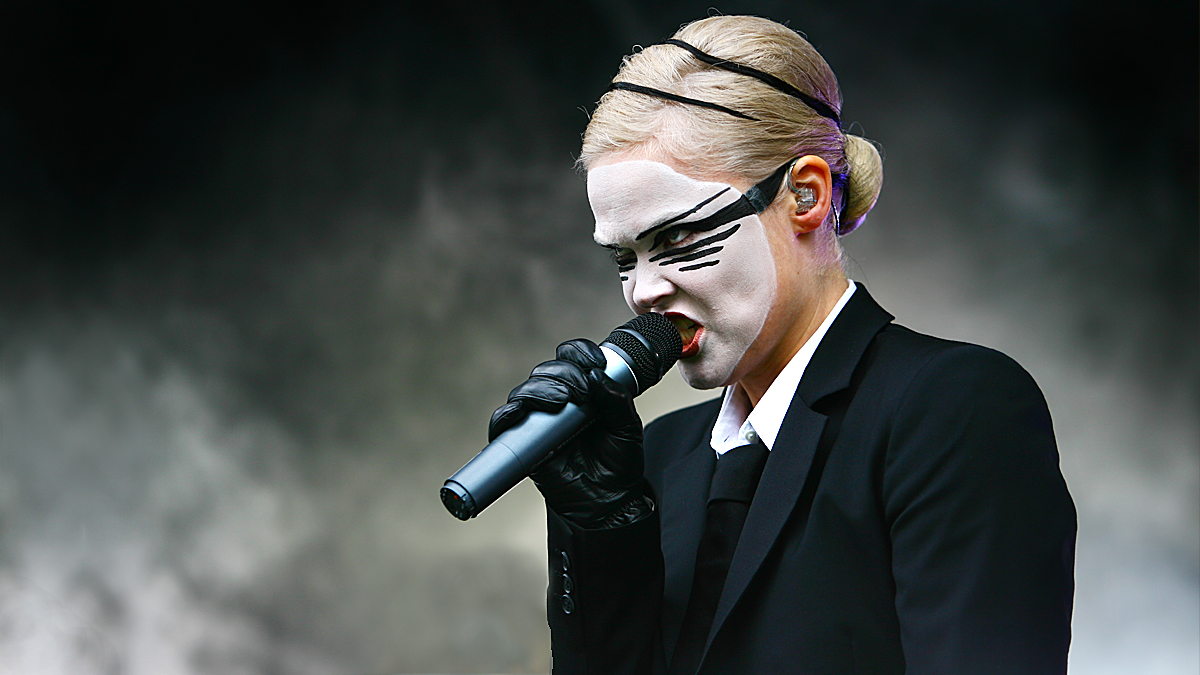
Anja Garbarek

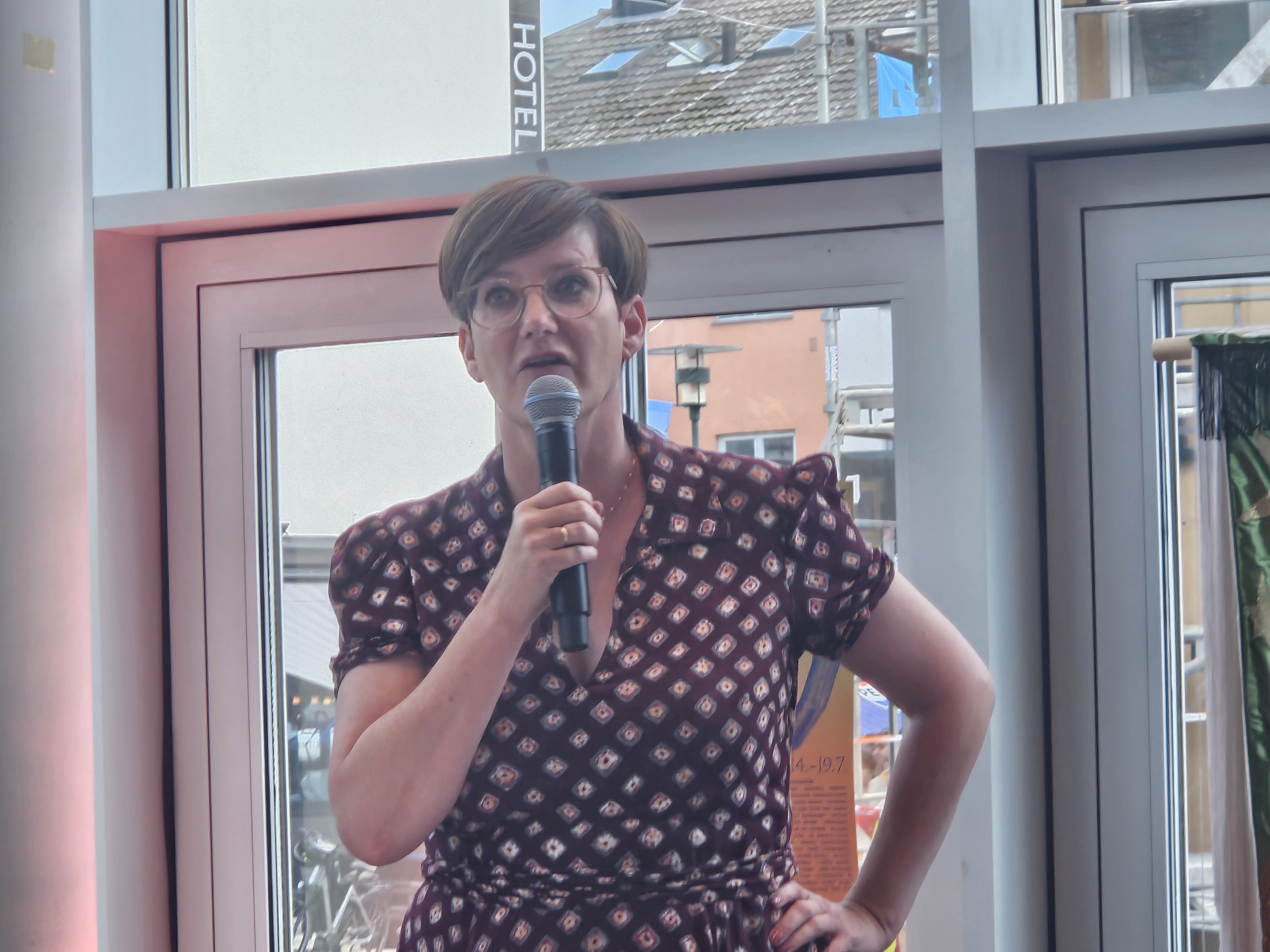
Veslemøy Hedvig Østrem

- 7 July – Susann Goksør Bjerkrheim, handball player.
- 13 July – Gudrun Høie, sport wrestler.
- 15 July – Kjerstin Braathen, business executive.
- 15 July – Bente Estil, politician
- 24 July – Anja Garbarek, singer-songwriter
- 26 July – Ingvil Aarbakke, artist (d.2005)
- 31 July – Kari Mangrud Alvsvåg, bishop.
- 12 August – Stig Kristiansen, racing cyclist.
- 17 August – Øyvind Leonhardsen, footballer.
- 20 August – Ove Jørstad footballer (d.2008)
- 24 August – Mona Dahle, handball player.
- 27 August – Gisle Elvebakken, speed skater.
- 3 September – Veslemøy Hedvig Østrem, newspaper editor.
- 15 September – Hege Reitan, sport wrestler.
- 15 September – Monica Valvik, racing cyclist.
- 22 September – Ole Petter Andreassen, musician and producer

=== October to December ===
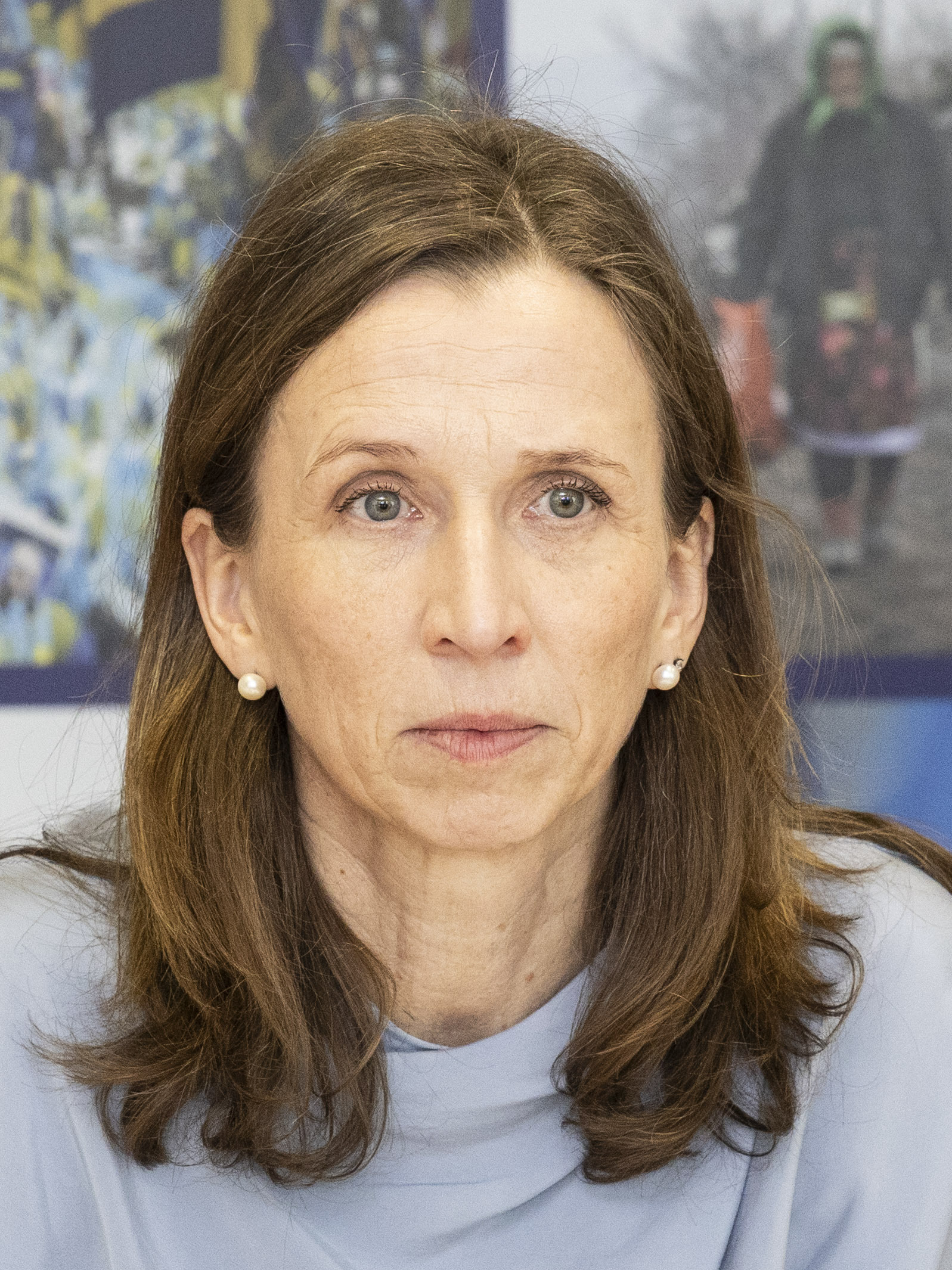
Astri Aas-Hansen

- 5 October – Tord Gustavsen, jazz musician.
- 27 October – Cathrine Marie Lofthus, physician and civil servant.
- 6 November – Siri Kalvig, meteorologist.
- 13 November – Kjerstin Wøyen Funderud, politician.
- 19 November – Rune Bakervik, politician.
- 22 November – Nils-Ole Foshaug, politician.
- 8 December – Mads Ousdal, actor.
- 16 December – Astri Aas-Hansen, politician
- 31 December – Inga Bejer Engh, civil servant.

=== Full date missing ===
- Nina Schanke Funnemark, tax director.

== Notable deaths ==
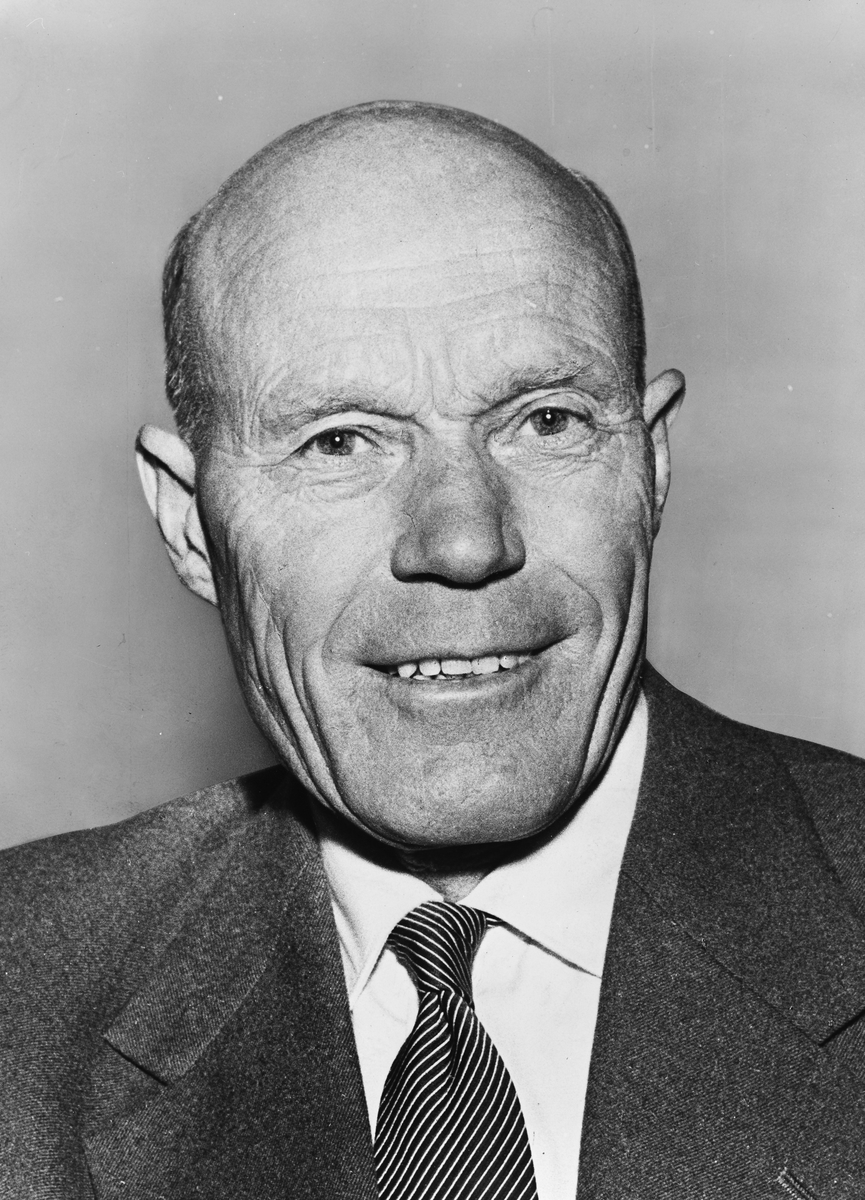
Tarjei Vesaas

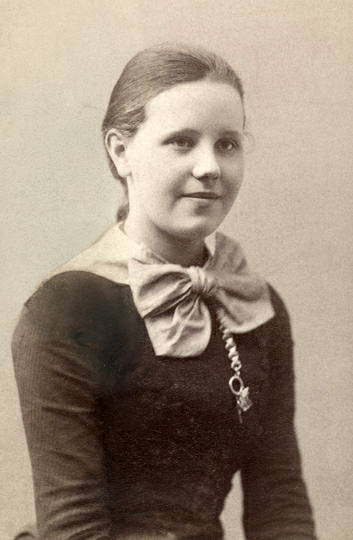
Bokken Lasson

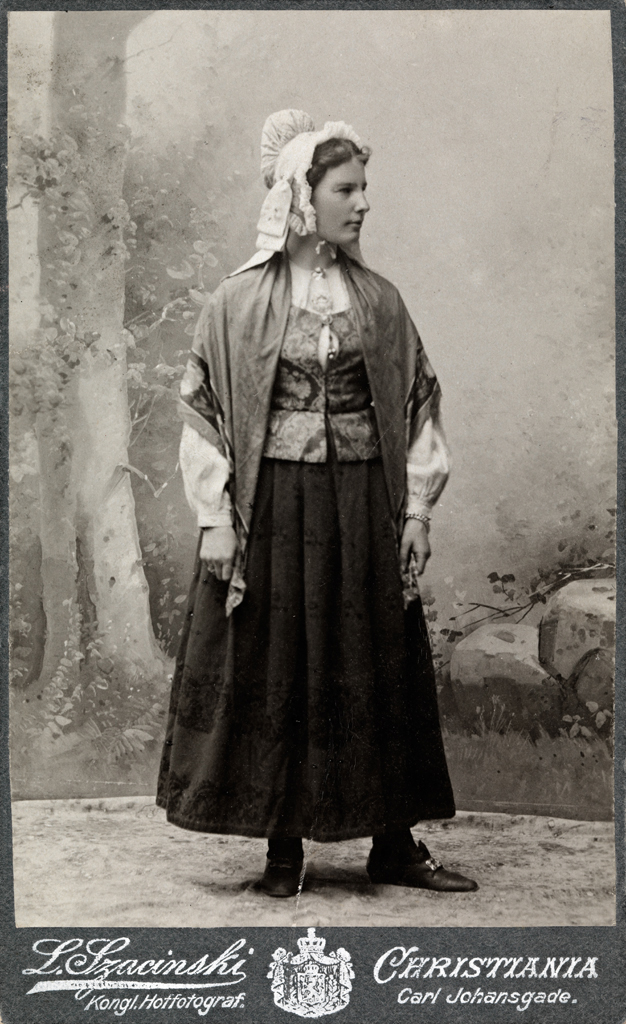
Klara Semb

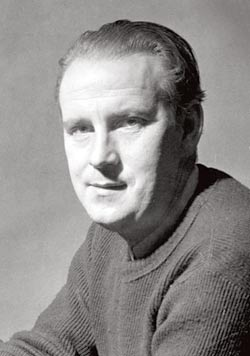
Alf Prøysen

- 10 January – Babbis Friis-Baastad, writer (born 1921).
- 18 January – Haakon Lie, writer (born 1884).
- 22 January – Sigurd Winge, painter (born 1909).
- 28 January – Harald Ramm, barrister (born 1895).
- 2 February – Hannah Ryggen, textile artist (born 1894).
- 4 February – Sig Haugdahl, motor racing driver in America (b.1891)
- 7 February – Ole Landmark, architect (b.1885)
- 11 February – Per Næsset, politician (b.1898)
- 12 February – Johan Strand Johansen, politician and Minister (b.1903)
- 20 February – Hugo Lous Mohr, painter (born 1889).
- 8 March – Elisabeth Reiss, pianist (born 1902).
- 15 March – Tarjei Vesaas, writer (born 1897).
- 18 March – Håkon Endreson, gymnast and Olympic silver medallist (b.1891)
- 28 March – Margarete Bonnevie, author and women's rights advocate (born 1884).
- 2 April – Agnes Hvoslef, operatic soprano (born 1883).
- 18 April – Halfdan Bjølgerud, high jumper (b.1884)
- 5 May – Finn Bjørnseth, geodesist (born 1892).
- 12 May – Gunvald Tomstad, resistance fighter (b.1918)
- 22 May – Birger Var, rower and Olympic bronze medallist (b.1893)
- 24 May – Harald Hagen, sailor and Olympic gold medallist (b.1902)
- 17 June – Alfred Høy, engineer (born 1885).
- 27 June – Lauritz Schmidt, sailor and Olympic silver medallist (b.1897)
- 11 July – Niels Larsen Bruun, naval officer (born 1893)
- 28 July – Ola Teigen, politician (b.1937)
- 29 July – Johannes S. Andersen, renowned career criminal and resistance fighter (b.1898)
- 3 August – Bokken Lasson, concert and cabaret singer (born 1871).
- 6 August – August Lange, educator (born 1907).
- 23 September – Magnus Johansen, politician (b.1886)
- 23 September – Arne Kavli, painter (born 1878).
- 8 October – Rolf Bull-Hansen, educator (born 1888).
- 12 October – Alfred Vågnes, politician (b.1880)
- 16 October – Klara Semb, folklorist (born 1884).
- 19 October – Conrad Olsen, rower and Olympic bronze medallist (b.1891)
- 30 October – Sigbjørn Mustad, lawyer (born 1897).
- 9 November – John Schjelderup Giæver, author and polar researcher (b.1901)
- 23 November – Alf Prøysen, writer and musician (b.1914).
- 25 December – Arthur David-Andersen, goldsmith (born 1875).

=== Full date unknown ===
- Halvard Lange, diplomat, politician and Minister (b.1902)
- Ole H. Løvlien, politician (b.1897)
- Sverre Munck, businessperson (b.1898)
- Jakob Martin Pettersen, politician and Minister (b.1899)
- Henry Rudi, huntsman and polar bear hunter (b.1889)
- Isdal Woman, Belgian or French tourist murdered in Ulriken, Bergen, November 1970.
