= Gry =

Gry or GRY may refer to:

== People ==
- Gry (given name), a female given name used primarily in Scandinavia, equivalent to the English Dawn
- Gry Bagøien, female singer in the band Gry and now Æter
- Gry Johansen (born 1964), Danish pop singer
- Jørgen Gry (1915–1993), Danish field hockey player who competed in the 1936 Summer Olympics

== Transport ==
- Glenroy railway station, in Victoria, Australia
- Goraya railway station, in Punjab, India
- Grays railway station, Essex, England (National Rail station code GRY)
- Grímsey Airport, in Iceland

== Other uses ==
- Gry (band), a former Danish band
- Barclayville Grebo language
- -gry puzzle, a word puzzle
