= Frank & Tony =

Electronic music duo

- Origin: New York City, United States
- Genres: Electronic; alternative; dance; deep house
- Years active: 2012–2017; 2020–present
- Label: Scissor and Thread
- Members: Anthony Collins; Francis Harris
- Website: frankandtony.bandcamp.com

Frank and Tony, stylized as Frank & Tony, are an electronic music duo, formed between two Brooklyn DJs and dance music producers, Francis Harris and Anthony Collins, from 2012 to 2017, and again from 2020. They had produced several EPs and singles independently before working together on the eponymous deep house project.

== History ==
In 2012, the New York-based pair formed a deep house project, releasing singles on their Scissor and Thread label, founded by Harris and honing their sound at their residency at Brooklyn's The Panther Room and Output in Williamsburg, gaining the support of DJ Sprinkles and other members of the Brooklyn DJ scene, in the process. In 2014, they released their debut album, You Go Girl, which stayed true to the duo's deep house foundations while also exploring dub music.

Harris and Collins both have long histories of churning out well received dance singles for DJs, with Harris's solo work focusing on more experimental outre composition and lush textures.

== You Go Girl ==
In 2014, the group released their debut album, You Go Girl, which was widely acclaimed in publications such as The Guardian, The New York Times, Resident Advisor, Fact magazine and Pitchfork media, with many of the albums singles being featured at festivals throughout 2014 and 2015. "Villa Seurat" became the most prominent song on the album, featured prominently in other DJ's mixes and playlists.

Though the album's sound is influenced by nineties deep house classics, it broke new ground by exploring dub and bass music, earning the group comparisons to Basic Channel and Black Coffee, and was followed by various mixes for Fact Magazine, Resident Advisor, Fabric London and BBC Radio One. In addition, the duo played several clubs and electronic festivals across Europe and the United States.

== Breakup and reformation ==
Frank & Tony officially disbanded as a duo in late 2017, with Collins moving to Marseille in France and opening up a restaurant, while releasing music under the moniker Gant. Harris, on the other hand, has continued the Scissor and Thread imprint, including releases under his own name, while running a listening bar in Gowanus, Brooklyn. Despite this, many of the duos releases are a staple of house and techno sets to this day, a testament to the groups enduring influence.

In 2019, Collins joined Harris for a few dates on his US tour. It was later revealed in 2020 that the duo were planning on another collaboration with an EP set to be released in the summer of 2021, according to a label news release.

== See also ==
- Bob Moses (band)
- Fabric
- Deep house

== Discography ==
Albums and singles

- Frank and Tony - Presents... Vol. 1
- Frank and Tony - You Go Girl album - Scissor and Thread, 2014
- Frank and Tony - RA.446 album art - Resident Advisor, RA.446, 2014
- Frank and Tony - Frank & Tony presents... - Scissor and Thread, 2012
- Frank and Tony - What You Believe album (12", W/Lbl) - Scissor and Thread, FAT006, 2014
- Frank and Tony - Go - Scissor and Thread, FATLP01-B, 2014
- Frank and Tony - You (12") - Scissor and Thread, FATLP01-A, 2014
- Frank and Tony - The Gales (12"), Mule Musiq, mule musiq 186, 2015
- Frank and Tony - Record Store Day EP (12", EP, Ltd, W/Lbl), Scissor and Thread, FATRSD15 2015
- Frank and Tony - Apprentice EP (12", EP), Scissor and Thread, SAT23, 2015
- Frank and Tony - Waiting Ground, 2016
- Frank and Tony - Under The Jaguar Sun' (12") Scissor And Thread, SAT027, 2016
- Frank and Tony - Harmonium EP (12", EP), Scissor and Thread, SAt029, 2016
- Frank and Tony - Odes, Scissor and Thread, 2017

DJ Mixes

- Frank and Tony - FACT Mix 492 album art
- FACT Mix 492 (File, MP3, Mixed, 320), FACT Magazine, FACT 492, 2015
