= Hofmo =

Hofmo is a Norwegian surname. Notable people with the surname include:

- Gunvor Hofmo (1921–1995), Norwegian writer
- Rolf Hofmo (1898–1966), Norwegian politician and sports official
