= Days Gone By (Bob Moses album) =

Studio album by Bob Moses
- Released: September 18, 2015
- Genres: Dance; electro house
- Length: 59:03
- Label: Domino Recording Company Limited

Bob Moses chronology
| All in All (2015) | Days Gone By (2015) | Battle Lines (2018) |

Days Gone By is the debut LP album by the Canadian electronic music duo Bob Moses, released on September 18, 2015 via the Domino Recording Company. It received positive reviews from critics and earned Bob Moses a nomination for Electronic Album of the Year at the Juno Awards.

== Background and composition ==
Bob Moses formed in 2011 when high school friends Tom Howie and Jimmy Vallance reconnected in New York City. They signed to Scissor and Thread and released two EPs. Bob Moses then signed to Domino Records, who asked them to make an album. Bob Moses had wanted to create an album for some time, but wanted to release EPs first as a "stepping stone". Days Gone By was recorded in a former candlestick factory in Brooklyn that had been converted into studio spaces. Howie stated that a general theme of the album was a lot of "melancholy with a sense of hope".

== Critical reception ==
Professional ratings
Aggregate scores
| Source | Rating |
|---|---|
| Metacritic | 73/100 |
Review scores
| Source | Rating |
| AllMusic | 4/5 stars |
| Mixmag | 8/10 |
| Exclaim! | 7/10 |
| The 405 | 6/10 |

According to the review aggregator Metacritic, Days Gone By received "generally favorable reviews" based on a weighted average score of 73 out of 100 from 6 critic scores. David Jeffries of AllMusic noted that Days Gone By seemed more "song-oriented" than their EPs, and concluded that “Bob Moses remain the masters of restrained bliss house". Calum Slingerland wrote in an Exclaim! review that Days Gone By toed "a line both musically and lyrically between the darkness and the dance floor" and would "perhaps best enjoyed in the later hours, whether you're in your own head or out of it". S Worthy of Mixmag considered Days Gone By as a "LP of grown-up electronica that... boasts song-writing with serious crossover potential". In a review for The 405, Troy Keon wrote that "While there are elements to Days Gone By that still don't sit right, the album is an honest exploration of moods, and Bob Moses' unique combination of dance movement and introspective songcraft engages". Andrew Ryce wrote in a review for Resident Advisor that "few acts in recent memory have bridged the gap between rock and dance music like Bob Moses."

Days Gone By was nominated for Electronic Album of the Year at the Juno Awards of 2017, with Bob Moses also being nominated for Breakthrough Group of the Year at the same ceremony. The track "Tearing Me Up” was nominated for Best Dance Recording at the 59th Annual Grammy Awards, while a remix of it by RAC won for Best Remixed Recording.

== Track listing ==
| No. | Title | Writer(s) | Length |
|---|---|---|---|
| 1. | "Like It or Not" | Jimmy Vallance; Tom Howie | 6:20 |
| 2. | "Talk" | Vallance; Howie | 6:49 |
| 3. | "Before I Fall" | Vallance; Howie | 3:59 |
| 4. | "Too Much Is Never Enough" | Vallance; Howie | 5:25 |
| 5. | "Tearing Me Up" | Vallance; Howie | 7:50 |
| 6. | "Keeping Me Alive" | Vallance; Howie | 4:53 |
| 7. | "Nothing at All" | Vallance; Howie | 5:17 |
| 8. | "Days Gone By" | Vallance; Howie | 6:45 |
| 9. | "Writing on the Wall" | Vallance; Howie | 4:14 |
| 10. | "Touch and Go" | Iain Howie; Vallance; Howie | 7:26 |
| Total length: | | | 59:03 |

Days Gone By (Never Enough Edition)
| No. | Title | Length |
|---|---|---|
| 11. | "She Don't Mind" (Bonus Track) | 4:36 |
| 12. | "Here We Are" (Bonus Track) | 3:37 |
| 13. | "Before I Fall" (Acoustic) | 3:26 |
| 14. | "Like It or Not" (Joris Voorn Remix) | 7:36 |
| 15. | "Tearing Me Up" (A-Trak Remix) | 4:38 |
| 16. | "Tearing Me Up" (RAC Mix) | 5:25 |
| 17. | "Tearing Me Up" (Tale of Us Remix) | 7:03 |
| 18. | "Tearing Me Up" (Live) | 7:14 |
| 19. | "Before I Fall" (Live) | 4:12 |
| 20. | "Nothing at All" (Live) | 5:40 |
| Total length: | | 112:00 |
