= Gry (given name) =

Gry is a feminine given name used primarily in Scandinavia, equivalent to the English Dawn.

- Gry Larsen (born 1975), Norwegian politician for the Labour Party
- Gry Østvik, former Norwegian biathlete and the first overall world cup winner for women
- Gry Forssell (born 1973), Swedish television host and radio talk-show host
- Gry Blekastad Almås (born 1970), Norwegian journalist
- Gry Bay (born 1974), Danish actress and singer
- Gry Bagøien, female singer from Denmark
- Gry Johansen (born 1964), Danish singer who represented her country in Eurovision Song Contest 1983
