= Aarbakke =

Aarbakke is a surname. Notable people with the surname include:

- Ingvil Aarbakke (1970–2005), Norwegian artist
- Jarle Aarbakke (born 1942), rector at the University of Tromsø (2002–2013)
- Magnus Aarbakke (1934–2025), Norwegian judge
