= Gjone (surname) =

Gjone is a Norwegian surname. Notable people with the surname include:

- Egil Gjone (1925–1999), Norwegian physician and specialist in digestive diseases
- Erling Gjone (1898–1990), Norwegian architectural historian and antiquarian
- Martin Gjone (born 2005), Norwegian footballer
