= Hvoslef =

Hvoslef is a surname. Notable people with the surname include:

- Agnes Hvoslef (1883–1970), Norwegian operatic soprano
- Anna Hvoslef (1866–1954), Norwegian journalist, conservative politician and feminist
- Einar Hvoslef (1876–1931), Norwegian sailor
- Ketil Hvoslef (born 1939), Norwegian composer
- Waldemar Hvoslef (1825–1906), Norwegian Lutheran bishop
