= The Silence in Between =

Studio album by Bob Moses
- Released: March 4, 2022
- Genre: Dance
- Length: 42:22
- Labels: Domino Recording Company Limited and Astralwerks

Bob Moses chronology
Battle Lines (2018)	The Silence in Between (2022)	BLINK (2025)

The Silence in Between is the third album by the Canadian electronic music duo Bob Moses, released on March 4, 2022, via the labels Domino Recording Company and Astralwerks and distributed by UMG Recordings it received generally positive reviews from critics.

== Critical reception ==
Ryan Middleton in a review in the Magnetic Mag wrote that "Bob Moses build on their past work, keeping the pop songwriting and structures, but then taking things to another level sonically. It is high-energy with moments that will serve for the after-party of for a moment of brief madness at a live set. It doesn't totally change from their past success, but adds new layers to the discography." Jonah Krueger wrote that "Howie and Vallance have taken a somewhat darker direction. While they most certainly haven't abandoned their dance fundamentals, several tracks let the act's other, more left-field musical influences poke through." Isaac Martinez Trejos wrote that The Silence in Between is "an all-around phenomenal record from Bob Moses. 'The Silence in Between' is anything but quiet, blessing the listener with a colorful array of sounds and tones. It's that special sort of album- the kind you'll find yourself missing as soon as it's over.

== Track listing ==
No.	Title	Writer(s)	Length
1.	"Seen It Coming"	Jimmy Vallance; Tom Howie	4:13
2.	"Love Brand New"	Vallance; John Martin; Michel Zitron; Howie	3:18
3.	"Never Ending"	Vallance; Howie	4:02
4.	"Time and Time Again"	Vallance; Martin; Zitron; Howie	5:40
5.	"Back to You"	Vallance; Howie	4:22
6.	"Hanging On"	Vallance; Howie	3:55
7.	"The Rush"	Vallance; Mikky Ekko; Howie	3:38
8.	"Broken Belief"	Vallance; Howie	4:10
9.	"Ordinary Friend"	Vallance; Howie	3:10
10.	"Believe"	Vallance; Howie	5:51
Total length:			42:22
