= Battle Lines (Bob Moses album) =

Studio album by Bob Moses
- Released: September 14, 2018
- Genre: Dance
- Length: 48:09
- Label: Domino Recording Company Limited

Bob Moses chronology
Days Gone By (2015)	Battle Lines (2018)	The Silence in Between (2022)

Battle Lines is the second album by Canadian electronic music duo Bob Moses, released on September 14, 2018, via Domino Recording Company.

== Critical reception ==
The music review website Pitchfork gave the album a rating of 5.8 out of 10, describing it as "tasteful to a fault, joining gentle electronics with polite indie rock and vaguely wistful lyrics." According to the review aggregator Metacritic, Battle Lines received "mixed or average reviews" based on a weighted average score of 53 out of 100 from 4 critic scores.

== Track listing ==
No.	Title	Writer(s)	Length
1.	"Heaven Only Knows"	Jimmy Vallance; Tom Howie	4:22
2.	"Battle Lines"	Vallance; Howie	4:14
3.	"Back Down"	Vallance; Howie	4:10
4.	"Eye for an Eye"	Vallance; Tim Pagnotta; Howie	4:01
5.	"The Only Thing We Know"	Vallance; Howie	4:55
6.	"Nothing but You"	Vallance; Howie	3:39
7.	"Enough to Believe"	Vallance; Howie	4:39
8.	"Listen to Me"	Vallance; Howie	3:47
9.	"Selling Me Sympathy"	Vallance; Howie	4:34
10.	"Don't Hold Back"	Vallance; Howie	5:01
11.	"Fallen from Your Arms"	Vallance; Howie	4:43
Total length:			48:09
