= Bob Moses (band) =

Canadian electronic music duo

- Origin: New York City, United States
- Genres: Electronic; alternative; dance; deep house
- Years active: 2012–present
- Labels: Domino; Astralwerks
- Members: Jimmy Vallance; Tom Howie
- Website: bobmosesmusic.com

Bob Moses is a Canadian electronic music duo based in Vancouver, British Columbia. Formed in New York City, the band consists of Tom Howie and Jimmy Vallance. A remix of their song "Tearing Me Up" by RAC won a Grammy Award for Best Remixed Recording, Non-Classical.

== History ==
=== Formation ===
Howie and Vallance both attended St. George's School (Vancouver) but were merely acquaintances, despite enjoying similar tastes in music. They had both dabbled into the sounds of California punk, Northwest grunge, and minimalist electronic but never together.

After high school, Vallance moved to New York City, where he worked for a record engineering company for Dutch artist Matthew Dekay on Lee Burridge's All Day I Dream imprint. He began his career making trance and progressive house music, with early success at age 18 with releases on Ultra Records and remixes for Sia and her record "Buttons" alongside Chris Lake and Markus Schulz. After working for Dekay, Vallance began writing and engineering for Get Physical's co-founder and one-half of M.A.N.D.Y., Philipp Jung.

Howie continued singing and after a year at Berklee College of Music in Boston, Massachusetts, he also moved to New York. He was originally in the rock band Coalition.

Vallance and Howie reunited in a Lowe's hardware store parking lot. They started working on music in Howie's apartment, then shared a flat and began working on music as a duo. They helped write a vocal hook for one of the songs that Jung was working on, and experimented with different sounds, using Howie's background in rock music and Vallance's in trance music.

After some studio time, the duo showed the Scissor & Thread crew, specifically Francis Harris and Anthony Collins, what they had been working on. Harris suggested the name "Bob Moses" after New York urban planner Robert Moses, and their debut EP, Hands to Hold, debuted on that label in October 2012. Soon after the release of this first EP, they went on to deliver a second, Far from the Tree, before signing to Domino Records in March 2014.

=== Days Gone By (2015–2017) ===
Bob Moses' debut album, Days Gone By, was released on September 18, 2015. "Tearing Me Up" became the most prominent song on the album, earning Grammy Award nominations for best dance recording and best remixed recording, non-classical. It went on to win the latter award for remixer RAC. Vallance said the concept for the song was imagined while both of them were "going through something very similar" in their romantic lives. Howie has pointed out that part of the song's inspiration came from the beat of Gary Glitter's "Rock and Roll Part 2". The song received considerable radio airplay in the United States, having peaked at No. 16 on Billboard's Alternative Songs chart.

In January 2016, Bob Moses performed on The Ellen DeGeneres Show, after being personally picked by Ellen DeGeneres to appear on the show. They performed "Tearing Me Up". Tracks from Days Gone By have also been played on ABC's TV show, The Catch.

On August 19, 2016, Bob Moses released a special Never Enough edition of their album Days Gone By. The album featured remixes of "Like It or Not" and "Tearing Me Up" from artists including A-Trak, RAC, Joris Voorn, and Tale of Us. The album also featured two new bonus tracks, "She Don't Mind" and "Here We Are", along with live versions of "Tearing Me Up", "Before I Fall", and "Nothing At All."

In February 2017, the RAC remix of "Tearing Me Up" won the Best Remixed Recording for the remixers. Later that year, Bob Moses was nominated for Live Act of the Year at the Electronic Music Awards.

=== Battle Lines (2018) ===
On May 30, 2018, Bob Moses announced a new tour in North America, along with a new single titled "Heaven Only Knows".

On July 26, 2018, Domino announced that their second album Battle Lines would be released on September 14, 2018, and released its first single, "Back Down." The album was released on multiple streaming and music services as well as on CD/LP via their label Domino.

On December 12, 2019, the duo released the Unplugged EP, featuring acoustic versions of three songs from the Battle Lines album, plus a cover of the song Save a Prayer by Duran Duran, from the 1982 album Rio.

=== Desire (2020) ===
Bob Moses released an EP, Desire, on August 28, 2020, to multiple streaming and music services. The duo streamed a performance to a live audience at the Inside Lands festival on August 28.

Described by the artists as "a love tale for the digital age", the album is presented over six continuously mixed tracks. With typical tour schedules disrupted by the COVID-19 pandemic, the duo told Forbes that they intend to perform livestream sets and begin to collect content for another album.

=== The Silence In Between (2022) ===
Bob Moses released an album, The Silence in Between, on March 4, 2022, to multiple streaming and music services. The artists describe it as feeling "bigger musically, with dense, layered instrumentals; clear-eyed vocals; and gritty, textured arrangements that always seem to settle in the melancholy of minor keys."

Live performances: Bob Moses has performed and headlined at events and venues around the world, including Bonnaroo, where they headlined The Other Stage — a more recent popular place for EDM artists at Bonnaroo. They also performed at the Bowery Ballroom, TomorrowWorld, Ultra Music Festival, Governors Ball, Fabric, and many others. In 2016, they were announced to play at Coachella, Lollapalooza, and Bonnaroo, as well as at several European festivals including Sonar and Melt!. The act has been featured as one of the Top 20 live acts by Resident Advisor in both 2014 and 2015.

Bob Moses has been featured heavily on BBC Radio 1, including their debut Essential Mix and a live performance from Maida Vale Studios. They have also been featured on shows such as Morning Becomes Eclectic on KCRW and recorded a live session for KEXP.

== Personal lives ==
Vallance is the son of Canadian musicians Jim Vallance and Rachel Paiement.

In a 2023 year-end post on the band's official Facebook and Instagram pages, Howie and Vallance announced that they had both become fathers of baby boys.

== Discography ==
=== Albums ===
- All in All (April 20, 2015, compilation of first three EPs)
- Days Gone By (September 18, 2015)
- Days Gone By: Never Enough Edition (August 19, 2016)
- Battle Lines (September 14, 2018)
- The Silence in Between (March 4, 2022)
- BLINK (October 17, 2025)

=== EPs ===
- Hands to Hold (October 2012)
- Far from the Tree (October 2013)
- First to Cry (June 2014)
- Unplugged (December 12, 2019)
- Desire (August 28, 2020)
- Falling Into Focus (Live 2020) (November 20, 2020)

=== Singles ===
Title	Year	Peak positions							Album
Title	Year	CAN CHR	CAN Hot AC	CAN Rock	CAN Alt.	US Alt.	US Dance	US Rock	Album
"I Ain't Gonna Be the First To Cry"	2014	—	—	—	—	—	—	—	All In All
"Tearing Me Up"	2016	—	—	16	9	16	—	40	Days Gone By
"Heaven Only Knows"	2018	—	—	—	—	—	47	—	Battle Lines
"Back Down"	2018	—	—	32	16	16	28	—	Battle Lines
"Desire" (with Zhu)	2020	—	—	—	—	—	40	—	Desire
"Time and Time Again"	2021	—	—	—	—	—	50	—	The Silence in Between
"Love Brand New"	2022	—	38	4	1	1	11	29	The Silence in Between
"Hanging On"	2022	—	—	—	—	44	—		The Silence in Between
"Why Can't You Wait" (with the Chainsmokers)	2022	29	33	—	—	—	32	—	So Far So Good
"Do You Want Me" (with Hayden James)	2023	—	—	—	—	—	—	—	TBA
"Round & Round"	2023	—	—	—	—	—	—	—	TBA
"Time of Your Life"	2025	—	—	19	9	—	—	—	Blink
"Waiting on the World"	2025	—	—	—	—	—	—	—	Blink
"Last Forever"	2025	—	—	—	—	—	—	—	Blink
"—" denotes a recording that did not chart.
