= Bjørn Hougen =

Norwegian archaeologist

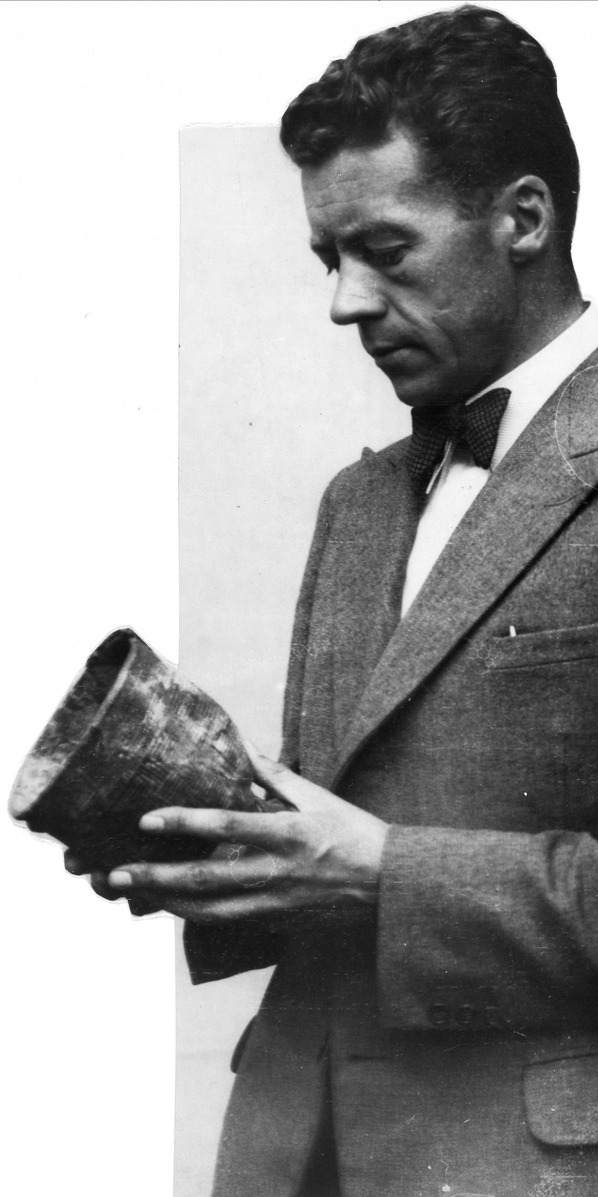
- Born: 15 September 1898; Sandefjord, Norway
- Died: 1 March 1976 (aged 77)
- Occupation: Archaeologist
- Awards: Order of St. Olav (1967); Order of the Dannebrog; Order of Vasa; Order of the Lion of Finland

Bjørn Hougen (15 September 1898 – 1 March 1976) was a Norwegian archaeologist. He was born in Sandefjord and resided in Bærum. He was appointed professor at the University of Oslo in 1952. Among his works are his thesis Snartemofunnet from 1935, and Fra seter til gård from 1947. He was decorated Knight, First Class of the Order of St. Olav in 1967, Commander of the Order of the Dannebrog, Order of Vasa and of the Order of the Lion of Finland.
