= Maria Strømme =

Norwegian physicist (born 1970)

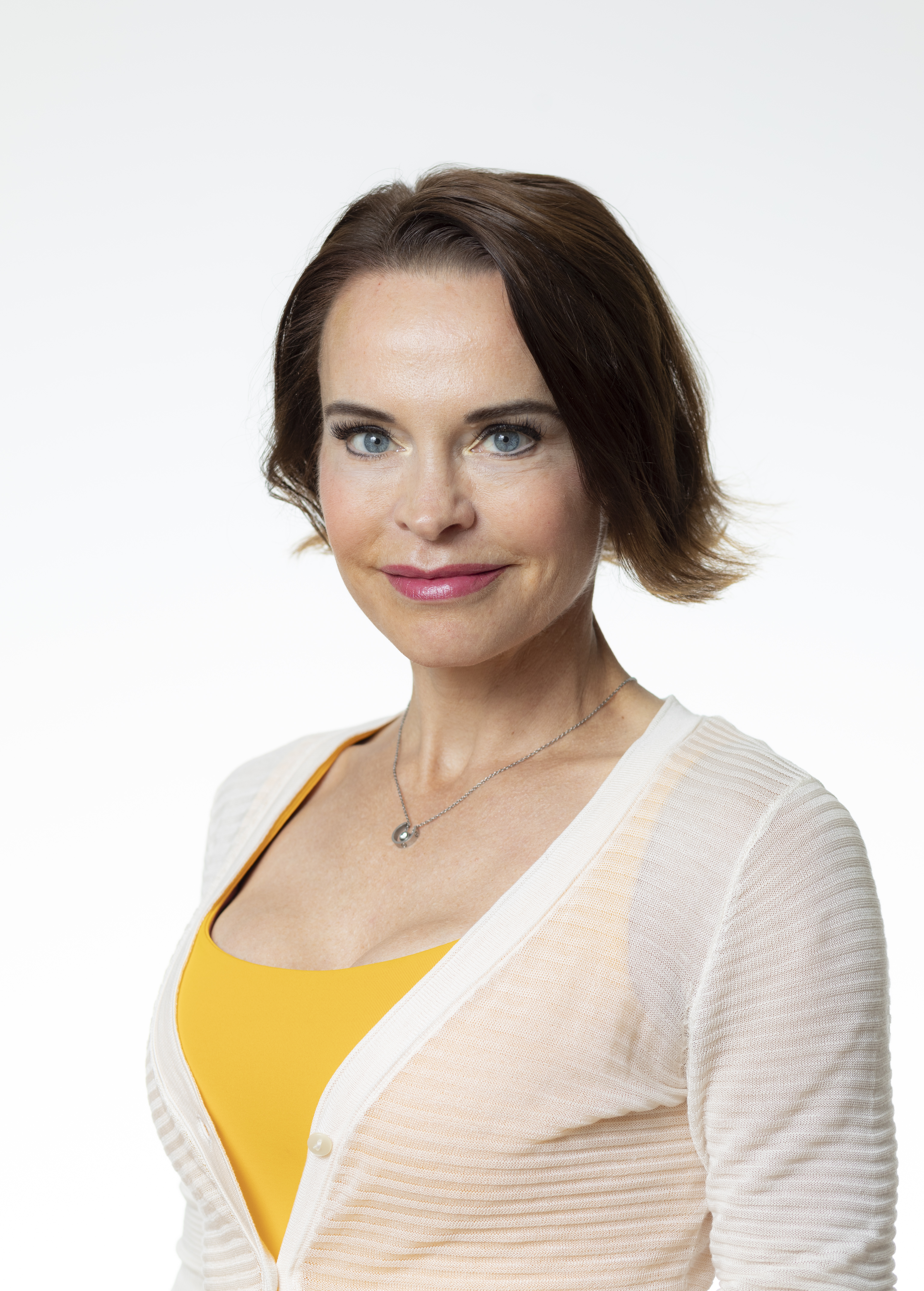
Maria Strømme in August 2020

Maria Strømme (born 7 April 1970 in Svolvær) is a Norwegian physicist who lives and works in Sweden.

== Career ==
She became a professor in nanotechnology at Uppsala University in 2004. She became Sweden's youngest professor in a technical subject. Strømme holds a master of science degree in engineering physics, and completed her doctoral thesis in solid state physics in 1997 at Uppsala University. She became a scientist at Naturvetenskapliga forskningsrådet. Between 2002 and 2007, she worked as an academy physicist and she was elected to the Royal Swedish Academy of Sciences. She is also a member of the Royal Swedish Academy of Engineering Sciences, the Norwegian Academy of Technological Sciences and the Norwegian Academy of Science and Letters.

== Retracted AIP Advances article ==
In 2025, Strømme published the paper "Universal consciousness as foundational field: A theoretical bridge between quantum physics and non-dual philosophy" in AIP Advances. The paper was retracted in 2026 by AIP Publishing and the editors due to concerns about its scientific validity, noting that a central operator in the theory had no associated measurable quantity and that the theory's predictions could not be empirically verified or falsified.
