= Kristian Alfred Hammer =

Norwegian politician

Kristian Alfred Hammer (14 June 1898 – 8 August 1965) was a Norwegian politician for the Liberal Party.

He served as a deputy representative to the Norwegian Parliament from Sør-Trøndelag during the term 1954–1957.
