= Einar Stang =

Norwegian painter and illustrator

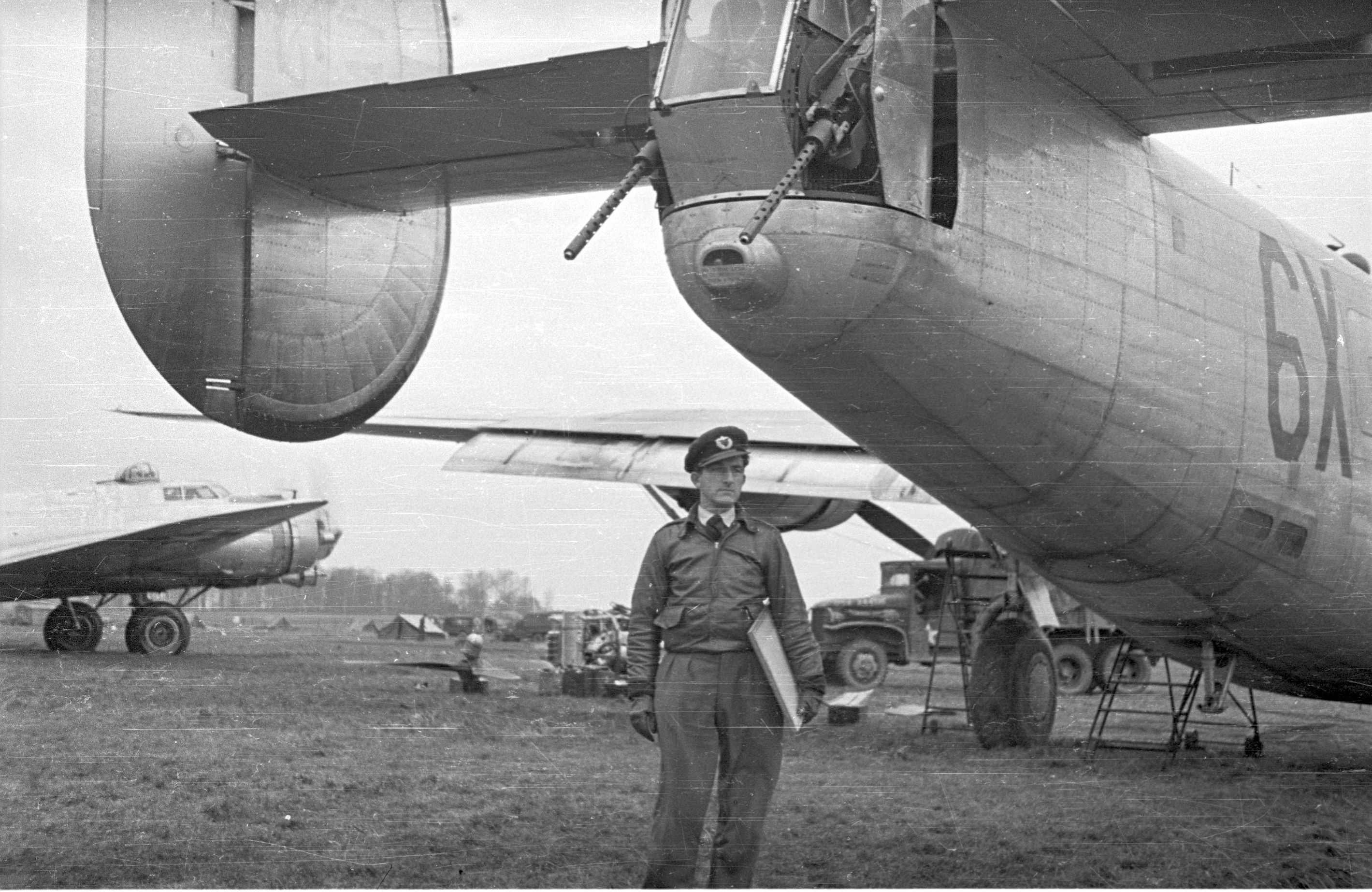
Einar Stang in front of a B-24 Liberator

Einar Stang (18 May 1898 – 5 June 1984) was a Norwegian painter and illustrator. He was born Arendal, educated at the Norges landbrukshøgskole, emigrated to Argentina in 1922, was in Canada and the United Kingdom during the Second World War, then back in Argentina until 1958, when he returned to Norway. During the Second World War Stang served with the exiled Royal Norwegian Air Force in Toronto and London, at the No. 132 Wing RAF. From 1958 he worked as freelance illustrator for various Norwegian newspapers. In his column "Sett og hørt på byen" for Verdens Gang he found motives from the city of Oslo. He was reporter for Dagbladet at Cuba, in the aftermath of the Cuban Revolution, and sports illustrator for Aftenposten. He is represented at the National Gallery of Norway. He died in Oslo in 1984.
