= Geir Tangen =

Norwegian crime fiction writer

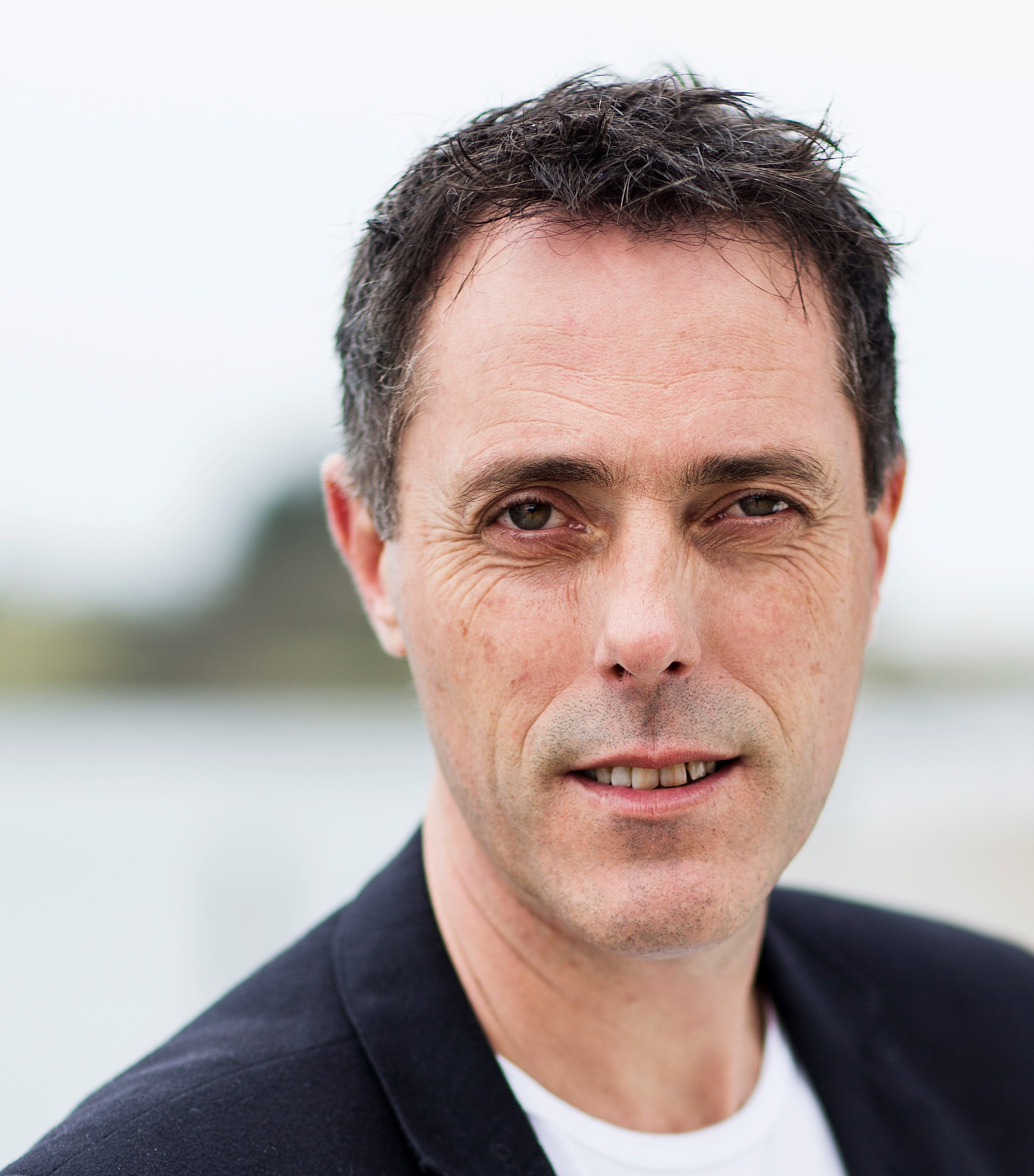
- Born: 15 January 1970 (age 56); Øystese, Norway
- Occupations: Schoolteacher; Crime fiction writer
- Website: https://bokbloggeir.com/

Geir Tangen (born 15 January 1970) is a Norwegian crime fiction writer and blogger.

== Career ==
Born in Øystese on 15 January 1970, and a schoolteacher by education and profession, Tangen made his literary debut in 2016 with the crime fiction novel Maestro. The novel is set in Haugesund and introduces the characters "Lotte Skeisvoll" (police officer) and "Viljar Ravn Gudmundsson" (journalist), who collaborate in solving a case with a mass murderer. The follow-ups Hjerteknuser (2017) and Død manns tango (2018) are hardboiled novels set in Haugesund with the same protagonists. The novel Vargtimen from 2021 introduces the protagonists "Gabriel Fjell" and "Aida Ibrahim". Internationally, his novels had been sold to fourteen countries as of 2022.

Further novels are La alt håp fare from 2022, Hundedager (2023), and Snøengler from 2025.

Tangen also runs a literary blog focusing on crime fiction.
