= Veslemøy Hedvig Østrem =

Norwegian newspaper editor (born 1970)

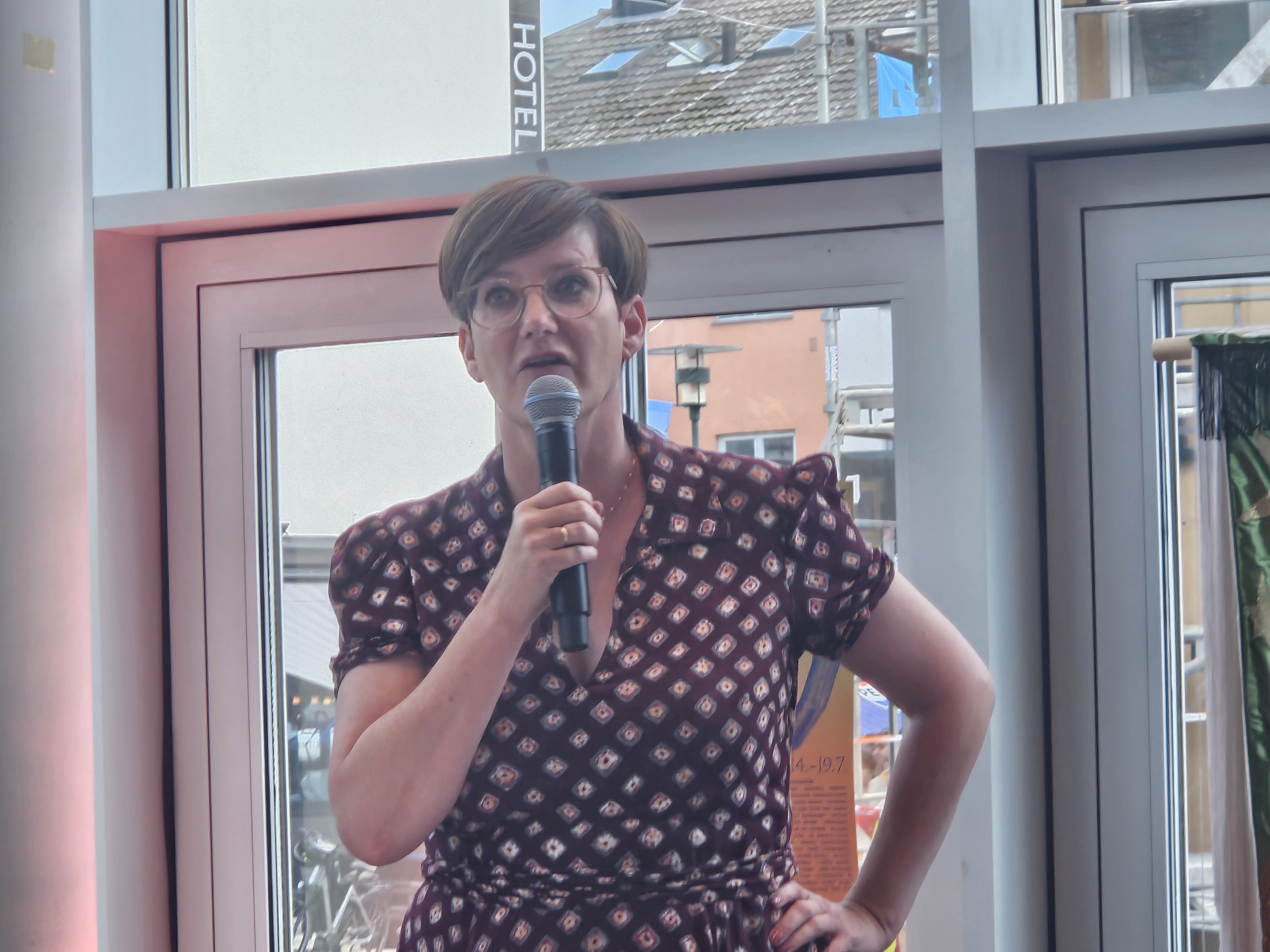
- Veslemøy Østrem in 2025
- Born: 3 September 1970 (age 55); Flesberg, Norway
- Education: University of Oslo
- Occupation: Newspaper editor

Veslemøy Hedvig Østrem (born 3 September 1970) is a Norwegian journalist and newspaper editor. She was chief editor of Altinget from 2022 to 2026.

== Career ==
Born in Flesberg on 3 September 1970, Østrem graduated as journalist from the Norsk journalisthøgskole in 1992, and in folkloristics and literary science from the University of Oslo in 1994.

She has worked as journalist for the newspaper Sunnmørsposten, and between 2005 and 2011 she held various administrative positions for media owned by the Bonnier Group. From 2011 to 2019 she worked for Aftenposten, and she was news editor for the newspaper Vårt Land from 2019 to 2022.

In 2022 she was appointed the first chief editor of the Norwegian branch of the online newspaper Altinget, owned by the Danish media group Alrow Media. In August 2026 new owners of Altinget decided to shut down its Norwegian branch, while continuing the Danish and Swedish branches. Østrem edited Altinget Norge from the startup in 2022 until its closure in 2026.
