= Randi Anda =

Norwegian politician (1898–1999)

Randi Anda (née Friestad; 29 December 1898, Egersund – 7 May 1999) was a Norwegian politician for the Christian Democratic Party.

She served as a deputy representative to the Parliament of Norway from Rogaland during the terms 1954–57, 1958–61, 1961–65 and 1965–69. Outside politics she was known for being a missionary to China.

During the Second World War, she and her husband Arne worked in Qiqihar, Manchukuo before they were taken prisoner by the Japanese on 8 December 1941. They were incarcerated in Qiqihar's concentration camp for three and a half years until the war's end.
