= Ove Jørstad =

Norwegian footballer (1970–2008)

Personal information
- Date of birth: 20 August 1970
- Place of birth: Alta, Norway
- Date of death: 10 February 2008 (aged 37)
- Place of death: Norway
- Position: Midfielder

Ove Jørstad (20 August 1970 – 10 February 2008) was a Norwegian footballer.

From Alta, Jørstad started his senior career in Alta IF. He joined Kongsvinger IL in 1996, playing in 31 matches and scoring 3 goals in the Norwegian Premier League. In 1998, he joined Lyn. He later played in lower leagues with Ituano FC, Asker and Fossum IF. In 2005 and 2006, he was the playing coach of Fossum.

In February 2008, Jørstad collapsed and died during a training session with the Fossum veterans' team.
