= Hans Rasmus Astrup =

Norwegian industrial entrepreneur, philanthropist and politician

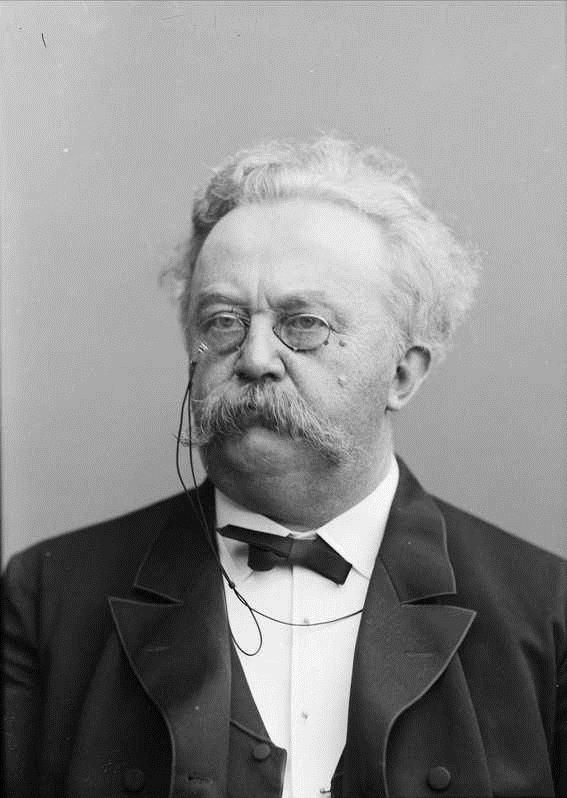
Hans Rasmus Astrup.

Hans Rasmus Astrup (17 April 1831 in Bolsøy – 19 February 1898) was a Norwegian industrial entrepreneur, philanthropist and politician with the Liberal Party.

Astrup was born and raised in the parish of Bolsøy in Romsdalen county, Norway. He was the son of Ebbe Carsten Tønder Astrup, who was mayor of Bolsøy Municipality for four years. He apprenticed as an office boy and salesman for Hans Clausen, who was a ship owner and fish exporter. In 1855, Astrup established his own import business. The trade expanded from fish to lumber, with suppliers in Finland and Sweden and markets in Great Britain. In 1860, he established his office in Stockholm. The business expanded until a fire in 1874. The loss, reconstruction and subsequent economic downturn made the following years to a struggle. In 1885, Astrup signed a sales contract with Swedish company Stora Kopparberg (now Stora Enso) and returned to Norway.

Astrup entered the cabinet of Norwegian Prime Minister Johan Sverdrup in 1885. He was Minister of Labour between 1885–1887 and a member of the Council of State Division in Stockholm from 1887 to 1888. He resigned in 1888. He served in the Norwegian Parliament from Kristiansund between 1889-1891 and between 1895 and 1897.

In 1884 he was a co-founder of the Norwegian Association for Women's Rights.
