= Birger Grønn =

Norwegian engineer (1898–1988)

Birger Grønn (17 April 1898 – 28 March 1988) was a Norwegian engineer. He was born in Kristiania. He graduated as ships engineer at the Norwegian Institute of Technology in 1922, and worked as engineer and later manager at the ships workshop Trondhjems mekaniske Værksted from 1939 to 1963. He was decorated with the British King's Medal for Courage. During World War II he was member of the undercover resistance movement in Trondheim, and after the war he was recruited to the secret stay-behind network.
