= Albert Andreas Mørkved =

Norwegian politician

Albert Andreas Mørkved (13 February 1898 – 29 October 1990) was a Norwegian lawyer, judge and politician for the Liberal Party.

He was born in Bodin Municipality as a son of farmers Johan Olaf Bernt Mørkved (1871–1938) and Anna Andreassen (1875–1960). In 1927 he married Frida Hjørdis Fredriksen.

He finished his secondary education in 1918 and graduated from the Royal Frederick University with the cand.jur. degree in 1922. He started as a junior solicitor, but settled in Mosjøen as an attorney in 1927. From May to October 1945 he was an acting police chief in Helgeland Police District. From 1949 to 1968 he served as the district stipendiary magistrate of Rana District Court.

While living in Mosjøen he was a city council member from 1937 to 1940 and in 1945. When becoming district stipendiary magistrate he served in Mo i Rana city council until 1959. He served as a deputy representative to the Norwegian Parliament from Nordland during the term 1958–1961. He met during 4 days of parliamentary session.

Mørkved chaired Helgeland Bilruter from 1937 to 1949 and the supervisory council of Mo Sparebank from 1956 to 1967. He was a board member of Vefsen Sparebank from 1930 to 1949 and Mo og Omegn Boligbyggelag from 1952 to 1964.
