= Inge Lyse =

Norwegian engineer (1898–1990)

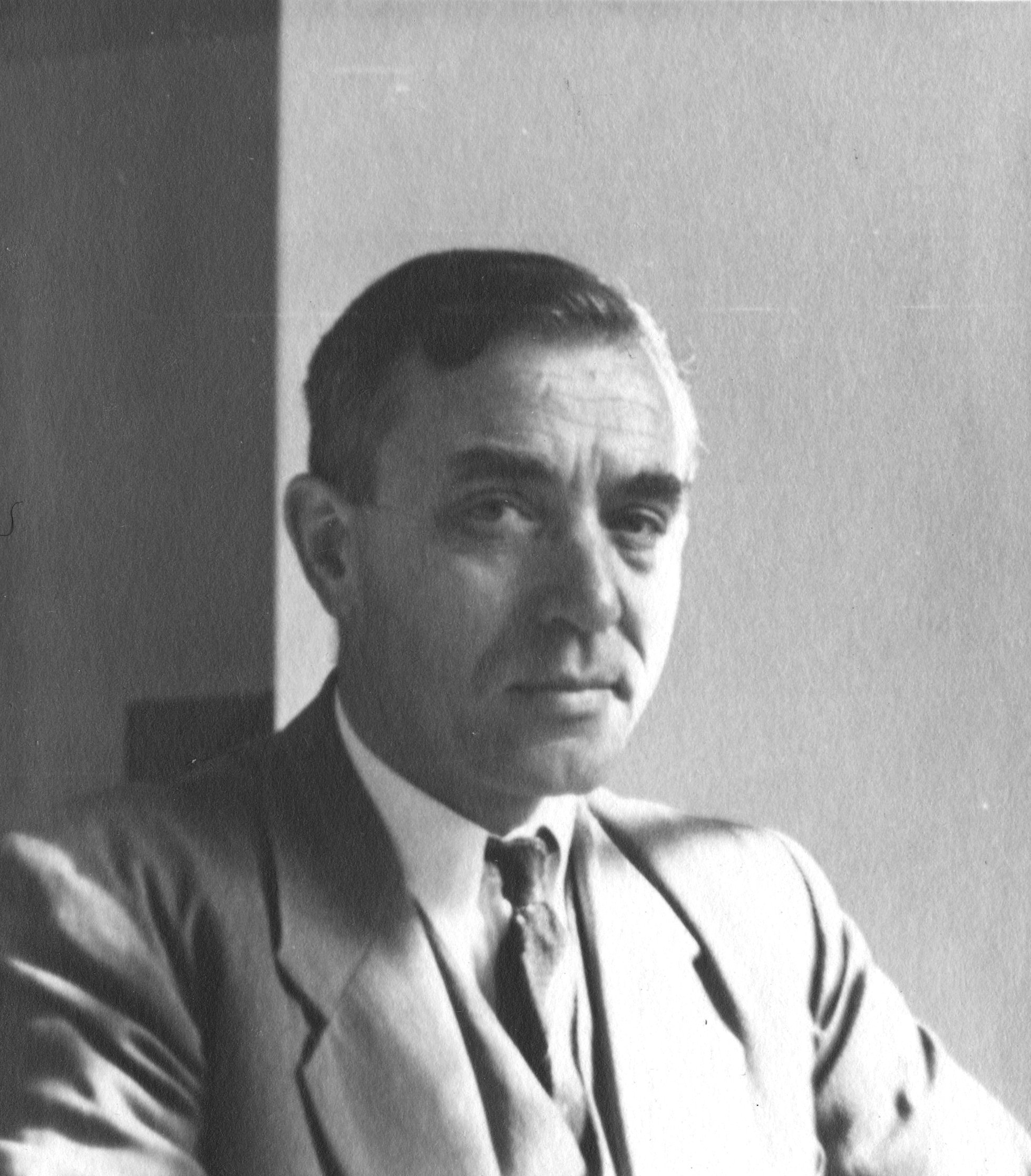
Inge Lyse in 1940

Inge Lyse (22 October 1898–1990) was a Norwegian engineer. He was born in Forsand Municipality. He was appointed professor at Lehigh University from 1931 to 1938, and professor in concrete and massive bridges at the Norwegian Institute of Technology from 1938 to 1968. He was decorated Knight, First Class of the Order of St. Olav in 1966. During World War II he was member of the undercover resistance movement in Trondheim, and after the war he was recruited to the secret stay-behind network.
