= Bjørn Skjærpe =

Norwegian artistic gymnast

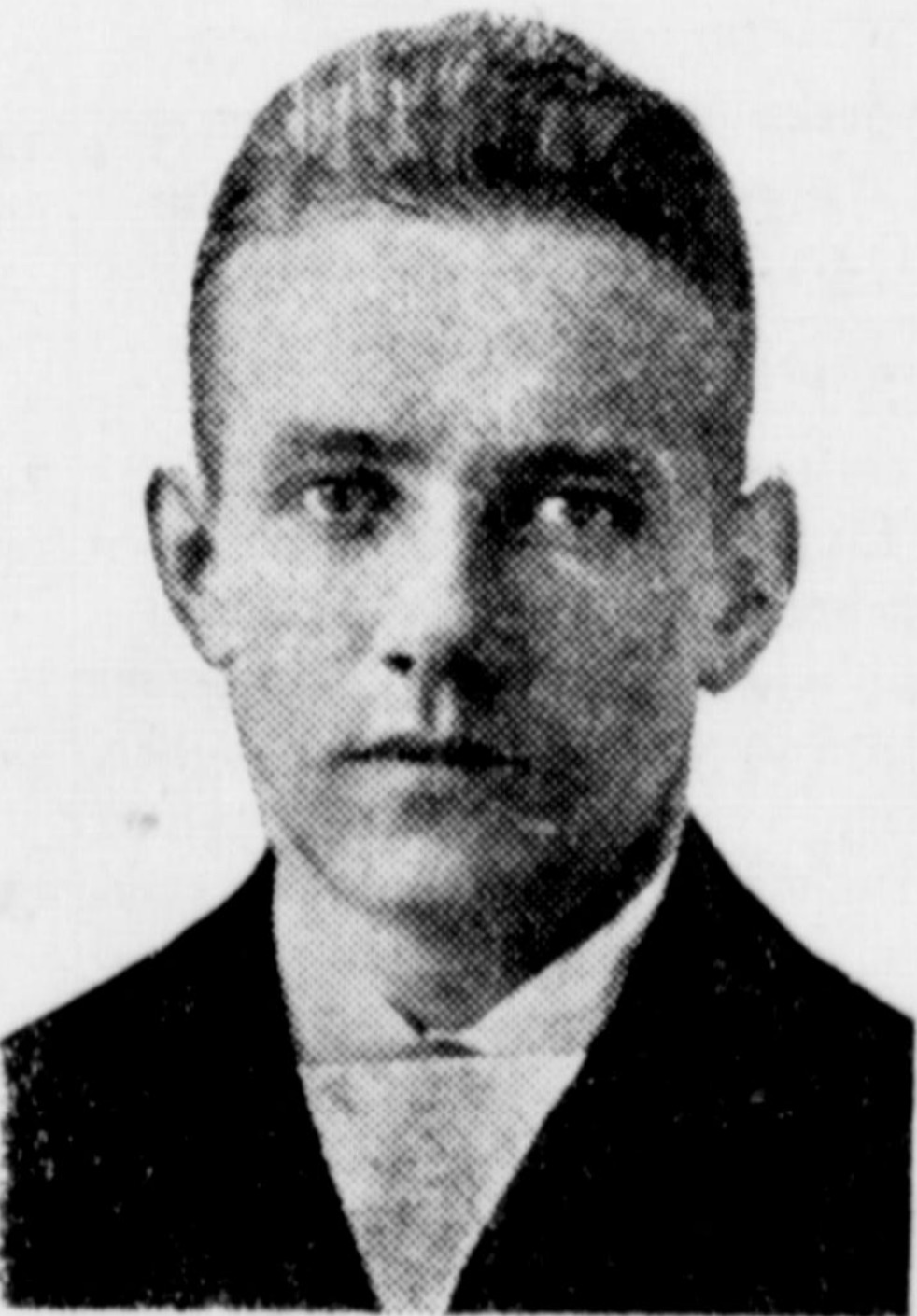
- Born: 20 October 1895 Nærbø, United Kingdoms of Sweden and Norway
- Height: 1.70 m (5 ft 7 in)

Gymnastics career
- Discipline: Men's artistic gymnastics
- Country represented: Norway
- Gym: Stavanger Turnforening
Medal record
Men's artistic gymnastics
Representing Norway
Olympic Games
Silver medal – second place	1920 Antwerp	Team, free system

Bjørn Skjærpe (born 22 October 1898, date of death unknown) was a Norwegian gymnast who competed in the 1920 Summer Olympics. He was part of the Norwegian team, which won the silver medal in the gymnastics men's team, free system event.
