= Rolf Bull-Hansen =

Norwegian educator and author

- Born: 29 February 1888 [[Norderhov]], Buskerud, Norway
- Died: 8 October 1970 (aged 82)
- Education: Bergen Cathedral School, University of Kristiania
- Occupations: educator, author
- Known for: drawing education with a focus on first developing creativity and spontaneity, followed later by technique and methodology
- Notable work: Anvendt tegning i skolen, Barns tegning og tegning i skolen, Tegning på naturlig grunnlag
- Parents: Fredrik Vilhelm Bull Hansen (father); Caroline Steenbuch (mother)
- Awards: Knight, First Class of the Order of St. Olav

Notes
- He was headmaster and later rector of the Norwegian National Academy of Craft and Art Industry (1938–1954).

Rolf Bull-Hansen (29 February 1888 – 8 October 1970) was a Norwegian educator and author.

== Biography ==
Bull-Hansen was born in Norderhov Municipality in Buskerud, Norway. He was a son of the headmaster and parish priest Fredrik Vilhelm Bull Hansen (1852–1923) and Caroline Steenbuch (1862–1939). He was an uncle of army general Fredrik Bull-Hansen. He attended Bergen Cathedral School and graduated in 1908 with a teacher's degree from the University of Kristiania (now the University of Oslo).

From 1938 he was headmaster and later rector of the Norwegian National Academy of Craft and Art Industry (Statens sløyd- og tegnelærerskole) in Notodden until his retirement in 1954.

He is known for his contributions to drawing education with a focus on first developing creativity and spontaneity, followed by technique and methodology. Among his publications are Anvendt tegning i skolen from 1924, Barns tegning og tegning i skolen from 1928, and Tegning på naturlig grunnlag from 1953. He was decorated Knight, First Class of the Order of St. Olav in 1948.

== Related reading ==
Kjetil Fallan (2016) Designing Modern Norway: A History of Design Discourse (Taylor & Francis) ISBN 9781315528649
