= Gunvor Hofmo =

Norwegian writer (1921-1995)

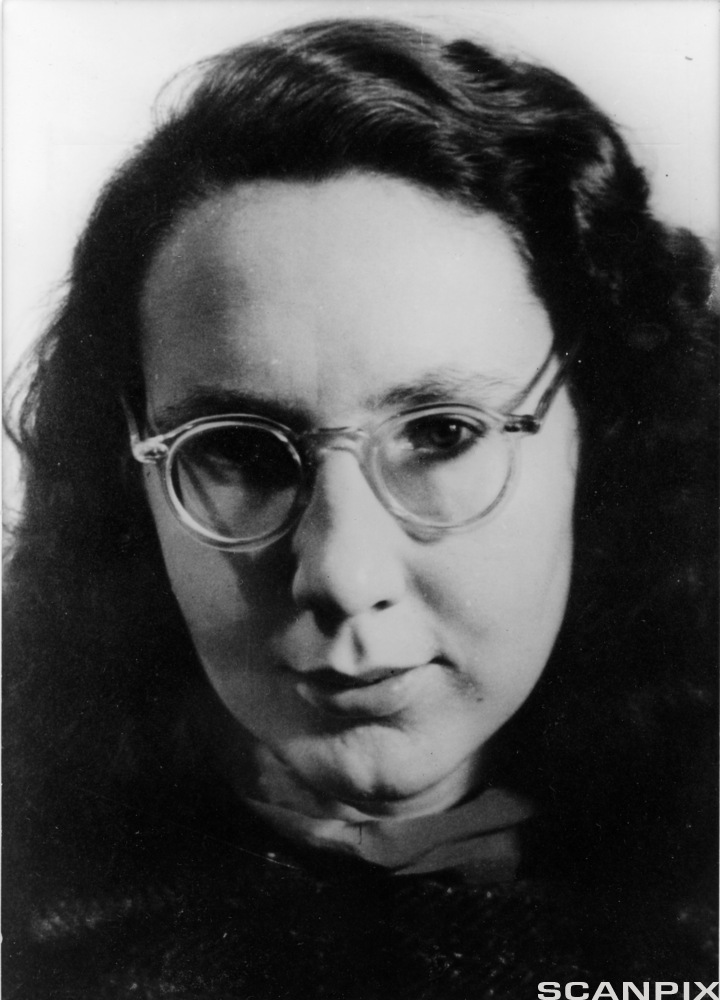
- Born: 30 June 1921; Oslo, Norway
- Died: 14 October 1995 (aged 74); Oslo, Norway
- Resting place: Vestre gravlund in Oslo
- Partner: Astrid Tollefsen
- Writing career
- Genre: Poetry
- Literary movement: Modernist

Gunvor Hofmo (30 June 1921 – 17 October 1995) was a Norwegian writer, often considered one of Norway's most influential modernist poets.

== Background ==
Gunvor Hofmo was born in Oslo, Norway. Her parents were Erling Hofmo (1893–1958) and Bertha Birkedal (1891–1969). She was raised in a working-class family among socialists, communists and anti-Nazis. Her father's brother Rolf Hofmo (1898–1966) was a sports official who was arrested during World War II and imprisoned at the Sachsenhausen concentration camp.

== Literary career ==
Hofmo started her literary career submitting poems for publication to a wide variety of presses, including the communist newspaper Friheten and weekly magazines such as Hjemmet. One of her first published poems was dedicated to her lover and Jewish refugee Ruth Maier (1920-1942). It was published in Magasinet for Alle, opening with the lines:

The words, shiningly silent
I shall find
give them to you, hammer some moments together
under the frame of eternity
so you will never forget me

Ruth Maier was an Austrian native who had found refuge in Norway in 1939. During the Occupation of Norway by Nazi Germany, Maier was arrested by German officials in Norway during 1942. She was deported and murdered during the Holocaust at Auschwitz. This event became by all accounts the central tragedy in Hofmo's life. She was hospitalized in 1943 for depression, starting a lifelong struggle with mental illness.

Following the liberation of Norway in 1945, Hofmo traveled extensively. She was in Paris in the autumn of 1947 and in Brittany in the spring of 1950. She also made several trips to Copenhagen and also traveled to Stockholm, Amsterdam and London. She also wrote essays for publication, primarily in the daily newspaper Dagbladet. The topics included travel, Nordic poetry, and philosophical topics. Among her most noted contributions are a lengthy debate on the minimal daily cost of living a life barely out of penury in Paris and a treatise in defense of her poet colleague Olav Kaste (1902-1991). In 1953, she stopped publishing essays and instead concentrated on her poetry. Dagbladet published seven of her poems between 1952 and 1956. She published five poetry collections between 1946 and 1955.

She was institutionalized at Gaustad Hospital, suffering from mental illness, characterized as schizophrenia, paranoid type, from 1955 to 1971, leading to what was known as her "16 years of silence." Following her discharge, she went into a period of considerable productivity, publishing fifteen poetry collections between 1971 and 1994. From 1977 to her death she never left her apartment at Simensbråten in Oslo.

== Personal life ==
Gunvor Hofmo and Ruth Maier both characterized their relationship as unusually close and intimate. In her diary, Ruth Maier describes Gunvor Hofmo as her lover.

In 1947, Hofmo moved in with another writer, Astrid Tollefsen (1897-1973) and became one of the first Norwegians living in an openly lesbian relationship. They continued to live and travel together until Hofmo was incapacitated and committed for her mental illness.

== Works ==
- Jeg vil hjem til menneskene – (1946) ("I want to go home to the humans")
- Fra en annen virkelighet – (1948) ("From another reality")
- Blinde nattergaler – (1951) ("Blind nightingales")
- I en våkenatt – (1954) ("In a waking night")
- Testamente til en evighet – (1955) ("A will to an eternity")
- Treklang – dikt i utvalg (1963) (published with Astrid Hjertenæs Andersen and Astrid Tollefsen) ("Triad")
- Gjest på jorden – (1971) ("Guest on Earth")
- November – (1972)
- Veisperringer – (1973) ("Road barriers")
- Mellomspill – (1974) ("Interlude")
- Hva fanger natten – (1976) ("What the night captures")
- Det er sent – (1978) ("It is late")
- Nå har hendene rørt meg – (1981) ("Now the hands have touched me")
- Gi meg til berget – (1984) ("Give me to the mountain")
- Stjernene og barndommen – (1986) ("The stars and the childhood")
- Nabot – (1987)
- Ord til bilder – (1989) ("Words to pictures")
- Fuglen – (1990) ("The bird")
- Epilog – (1994) ("Epilogue")
- Samlede dikt – collected poems(1996)
- Etterlatte dikt – poems (1997) (posthumously, edited by Jan Erik Vold)
- Jeg glemmer ingen – poems (1999) (edited by Jan Erik Vold, illustrated with water color paintings by Ruth Maier) ("I forget no one")

== Prizes and awards ==
- Gyldendal's Endowment - 1951
- Kritikerprisen for Gjest på jorden - 1971
- Gyldendal's Endowment - 1974
- Dobloug Prize - 1982
- Riksmålsforbundets litteraturpris - 1989

== Related reading ==
- Vold, Jan Erik (2004). Mørkets sangerske (in Norwegian). Oslo: Gyldendal. ISBN 978-82-05-32891-4.
