= Alfred Høy =

Norwegian engineer

- Born: 17 August 1885; Drammen, Norway
- Died: 17 June 1970 (aged 84)
- Occupation: Engineer

Alfred Severin Høy (17 August 1885 – 17 June 1970) was a Norwegian engineer. He was born in Drammen, a son of Carl Anton Høy and Laurentze Margrethe Skougaard. He worked for Meraker Smelteverk from 1919, and was appointed manager of the plant from 1941 to 1950.
