= Kristian Rønneberg =

Norwegian politician

Kristian Rønneberg (3 July 1898 – 13 October 1982) was a Norwegian politician for the Farmers' Party.

He served as a deputy representative to the Parliament of Norway during the term 1954–1957. In total he met during 6 days of parliamentary session.
