= Tora Øyna =

Norwegian politician

Tora Øyna (31 March 1898 – 5 February 1991) was a Norwegian politician for the Centre Party.

She served as a deputy representative to the Norwegian Parliament from Vest-Agder during the terms 1958–1961 and 1961–1965.
