= Søndfjords Avis =

Norwegian newspaper

- Type: Newspaper
- Founded: 1898
- Ceased publication: 1909
- Political alignment: Liberal
- Headquarters: Florø

Søndfjords Avis was a Norwegian newspaper published in Florø in Sogn og Fjordane between 1898 and 1909. It was a publication of the liberal Venstre political party and took a radical stance on political matters, such as advocating republicanism. For this, it took a significant drop in readership from 1905 following the Norwegian monarchy plebiscite. A digital archive of the newspaper is available at the University of Bergen.

== Editors ==
- Elias Pedersen 1898-1903
- Martin Vanberg 1903-1905
- Ole Johan Vasbotten 1905-1909
- Olaf Rank Seter 1909
