= Nils Thune =

Norwegian politician

Nils Thune (2 March 1898 - 1 April 1988) was a Norwegian politician for the Centre Party.

He served as a deputy representative to the Norwegian Parliament from Oppland during the term 1950–1953.
