= Klara Semb =

Norwegian folklorist and choreographer

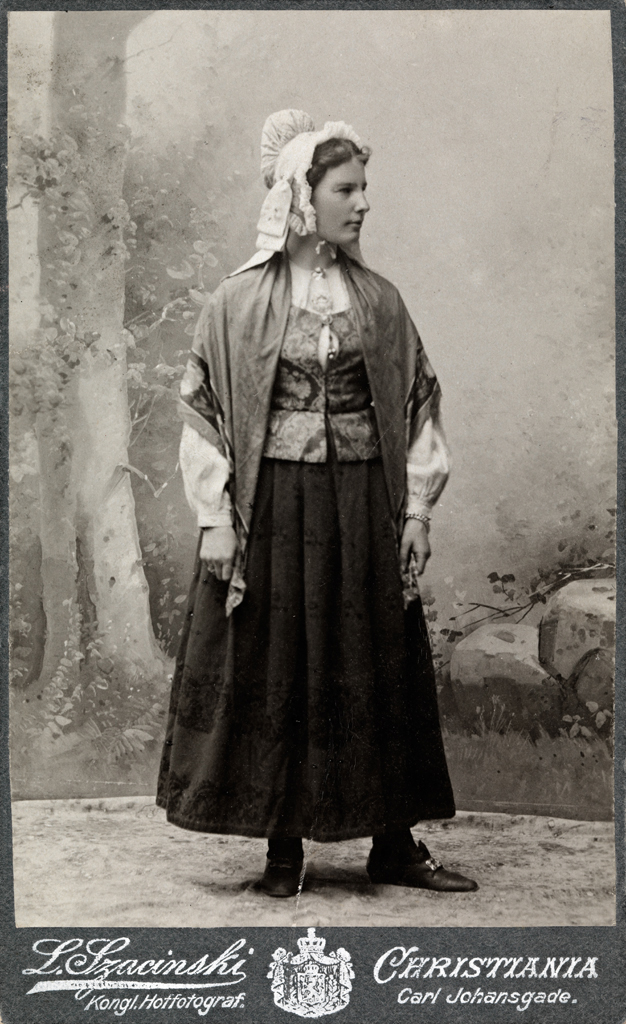
- Semb as a 16-year-old, wearing bunad from Østerdalen.
- Born: 17 October 1884; Kristiania, Norway
- Died: 16 October 1970 (aged 85)
- Occupations: Folklorist, choreographer and folk dance educator
- Known for: Documenting regional variations of the bunad, and bringing the bunad to a wider public
- Awards: Order of St. Olav

Klara Semb (17 October 1884 – 16 October 1970) was a Norwegian folklorist, choreographer and folk dance educator. She was born in Kristiania; the daughter of Ole H. Semb and Amalie Jansen. She studied and documented old folk song traditions, and led folk dance courses of the organization Noregs Ungdomslag. She documented regional variations of traditional costumes, the bunad, and was a pioneer in bringing the bunad into a wider public.

Among her publications are the 1920 songbook Norske Folkeviser and four volumes about Norwegian folk dances. She published the children's book Danse, danse dokka mi in 1958. She was decorated Knight, First Class of the Order of St. Olav in 1954.
