= Gry Bagøien =

Danish singer (born 1975)

Gry Bagøien (born 1975), known mononymously as Gry, is a singer from Denmark.

== Biography ==
Gry was born in Denmark in 1975. Until the age of 10 she was raised in Mozambique.

Gry was a member of now-defunct Æter, along with Jacob Kirkegaard, a Dane living in Germany.

Between 1998 and 2002, Gry formed an indie/electronic music/trip hop band with former Einstürzende Neubauten member F.M. Einheit (electro, percussive and non-percussive instruments), Sjang Coenen (bass) and Saskia von Klitzing (drums). Their debut album The Touch Of E! was released in 1998, followed by live shows in Europe and America. Second album Public recording was created in February 2000 as a publicly accessible project at the Marstalltheater in München, with numerous special guests: Caspar Brötzmann, Æter, Anatol Baginsky, Terranova, Pan Sonic, Funkstörung, Meret Becker, Chrislo Haas, and Sebastian Hess. The song "Summer Wine" from this album, a duet with Alexander Hacke, is a cover-version of the Lee Hazlewood/Nancy Sinatra song. "Gry" has been regarded as the band name, although the second album was credited to "Gry With FM Einheit And His Orchestra".

Gry also created an opera "Idea" for Resonance FM in London.

In 2006 she was in a band "The Loverz", releasing one album called "Love".

Gry moved to Berlin around 2009 and founded her own label, Present Records. There she released a solo EP "Anima" in 2009.

Gry was studying the art of film at the Academy of Media Arts Cologne. She graduated with the sound art film called "Wiiiu Whit Grrr", in which she was singing and talking with animals.

Gry is featured on the 2012 album "Leland" by Francis Harris, released by the label Scissor and Thread. A solo album is planned for release in 2014 on "Scissor And Thread" label.

== Participations and Releases ==
=== Solo ===
- Gry – All Comes Remix EP – Orphanear 2010
- Gry – Anima – Present Records 2010 (EP, part one of Xdent trilogy)

=== With Æter ===
- Æter – Luftantænder – Helicopter Records 1997
- Æter – Improvisations – aeter.dk 2002 (download)
- Æter – Oxygin – Autoproduction 2005 (download)

=== With F.M. Einheit ===
- Gry – Touch Of E! – Rough Trade Records 1998
- Gry – Public Recording – FM 4.5.1 2000
- Ammer/Einheit / Pan Sonic / Gry – Frost 79° 40' – FM 4.5.1 Records 2000 (Recorded live at the Stadttheater Oberhausen on 28 August 1998)

==== Singles ====
- 1998 Remixes
- 1998 Everything Or All
- 1998 I Never Asked
- 1999 Poles Apart
- 2000 Rocket
- 2000 Summer Wine
- 2000 Princess Crocodile

=== Guest appearances and other contributions ===
- Skole ost (children's punk band)
- Robot – Robot – Helicopter Records 1999 (guest singer)
- Pigface – The Best of Pigface – Invisible Records 2001 (guest singer)
- The Loverz – Love – Noreal Original Records 2006
- Francis Harris – Leland – Scissor And Thread 2012
- Christian Löffler – Feelharmonia – A Forest 2012 (guest singer)
- Frank & Tony – You Go Girl – Bring the Sun – Scissor and Thread – 2014 (guest singer)
