= Ingvil Aarbakke =

Norwegian artist

Ingvil Hareide Aarbakke (July 26, 1970 – November 23, 2005) was a Norwegian artist. With her husband Ion Sorvin, she was the moving force behind the Copenhagen-based collective N55 in 1994.

== Biography ==
Born in Bergen, Norway to academic parents, she studied at the Royal Danish Academy of Art in Copenhagen from 1991 to 1997. She went on to make an impact on the Scandinavian art world by helping to establish, in 1994, the art collective N55. Named primarily after Copenhagen's latitude, N55 came into being with its half dozen members sharing their living space and holding all things in common, with minimum private property. N55 holds that material objects ought to be shared and saved from the constraints of private ownership. N55's first showing came in 1996 at an exhibition at Denmark's Louisiana Museum of Modern Art, located north of Copenhagen, to mark the city's year as European cultural capital.

Ingvil Aarbakke's may have been influenced by Danish philosopher Peter Zinkernagel. All of N55's work product is freely accessible; their books, manuals, manifestos and images can be seen online and are not copyrighted. A prolific writer, Ingvil Aarbakke wrote most of the N55 Book together with her husband Ion Sørvin.

== Death ==
Ingvil Aarbakke's impending death from cancer was approached without regard for convention. She was reportedly a model of composure.

She was survived by her husband, Ion Sørvin, and their one-year-old son, Frode, as well as by her parents and siblings.
