= Per Næsset =

Norwegian politician

Per Næsset (8 March 1898 - 11 February 1970) was a Norwegian politician for the Liberal Party.

He served as a deputy representative to the Norwegian Parliament from Sør-Trøndelag during the term 1945–1949.
