= Erling Gjone =

Norwegian architect (1898–1990)

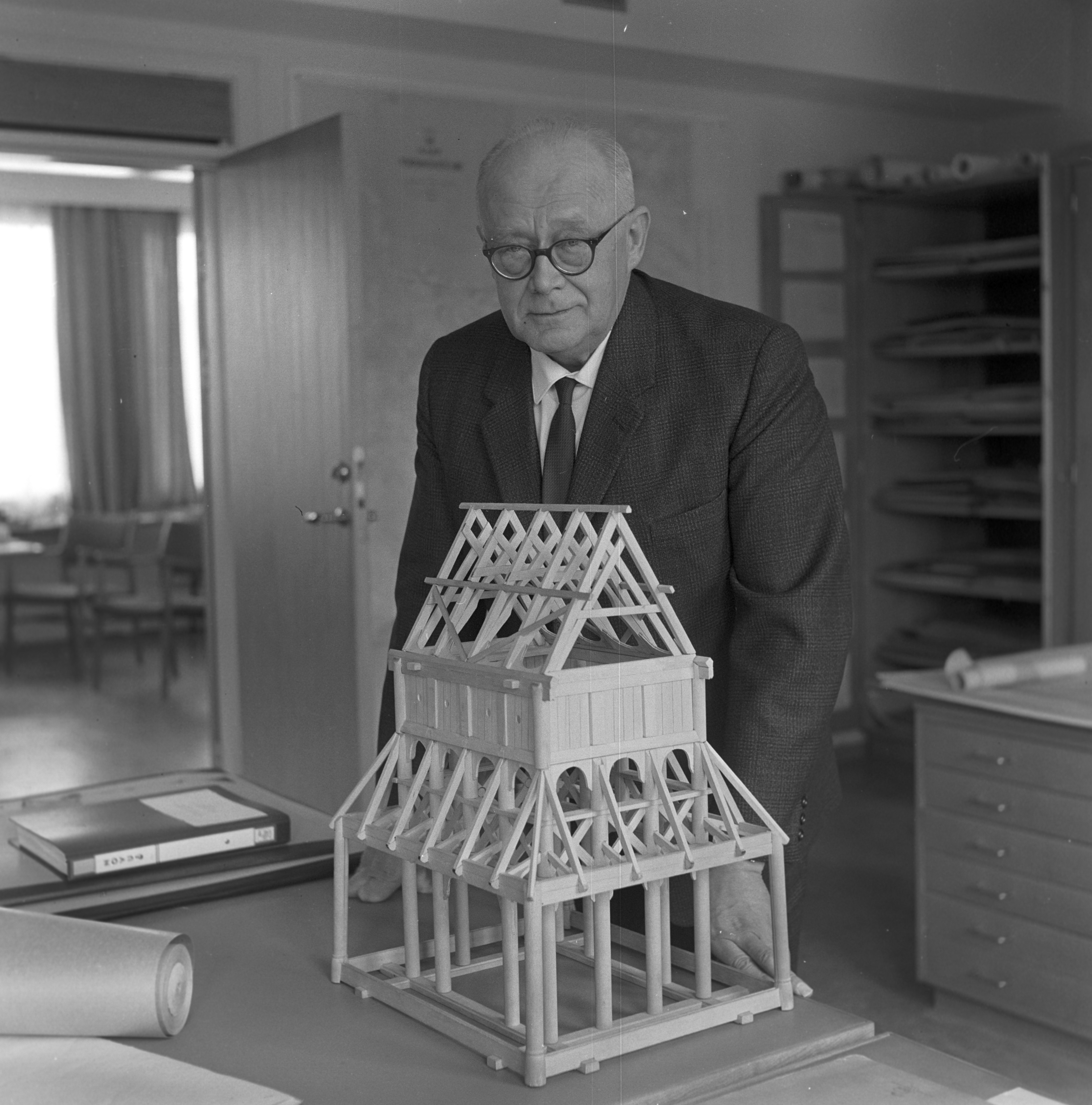
Erling Gjone with a model of a Norwegian stave church

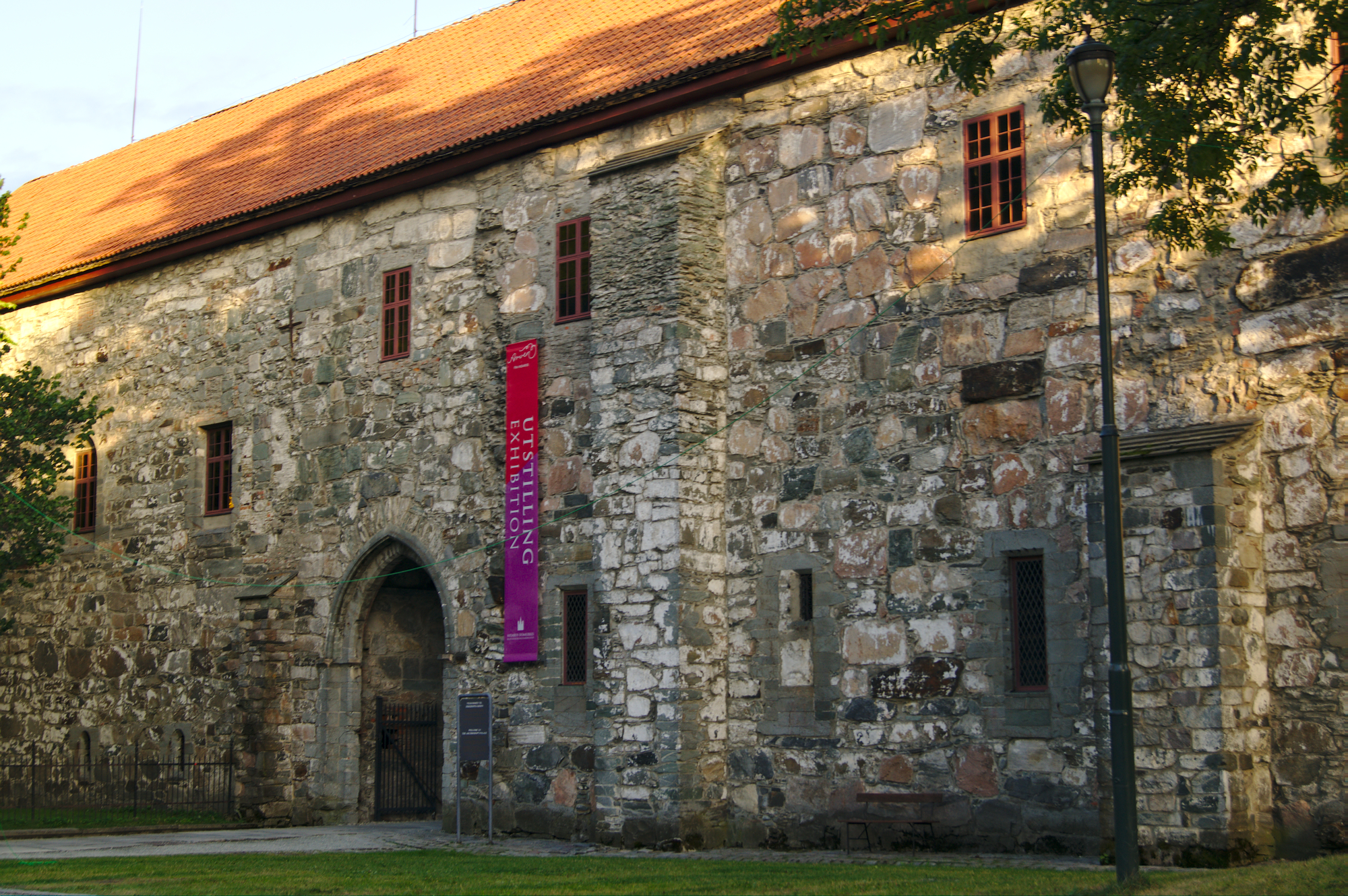
Restored medieval Archbishop's Palace in Trondheim

Erling Gjone (8 May 1898 – 10 October 1990) was a Norwegian architectural historian and antiquarian. Gjone made significant contributions to the preservation of medieval-era Norwegian buildings. He is most noted for his work with the restoration of the Archbishop's Palace (Erkebispegården) in Trondheim.

== Biography ==
He was born in Levanger in Nord-Trøndelag, Norway. He was the son of David Edvard Gjone (1871–1951) and Kristiane Øwre (1877–1970). After completing his studies at the Norwegian Technical College (NTH), Gjone was an assistant architect with Ole Landmark in Bergen from 1920 to 1924 after which he joined professor Johan Meyer at NTH in Trondheim. In 1931 Gjone was employed as a lecturer in early Norwegian construction at NTH.

During the German conquest of Norway in 1940 he took part in the Battle of Hegra Fortress, and later emerged as leader of the local chapter of Milorg, (the Norwegian resistance movement) in Trøndelag at the end of the war.

From 1947 until 1968, he was Professor of Architectural Development. He was a member of the committees for restoration of Austråttborgen and Bergenhus Fortress. His most ambitious undertaking was with the restoration of the medieval Archbishop's Palace in Trondheim (1962–75).

== Honors ==
- Knight of the Order of St. Olav in 1961 and Commander in 1973
- King's Medal for Courage in the Cause of Freedom (GB)
- Defence Medal
- Urnesmedalja

== Related reading ==
- Nordeide, Sæbjørg Walaker (2003) Erkebispegården i Trondheim (Oslo : Norsk institutt for kulturminneforskning) ISBN 8281010010
