= Rolf Hofmo =

Norwegian politician and sports official (1898-1966)

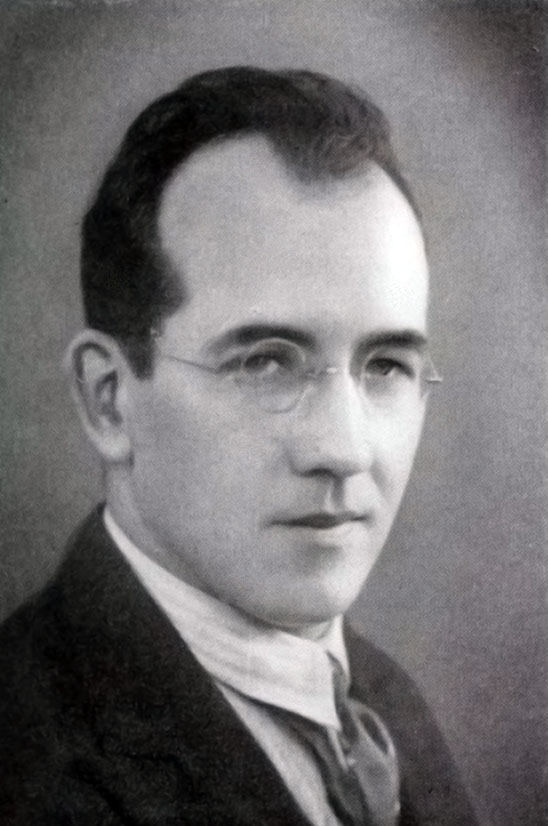
- Born: 10 August 1898; Kristiania, Norway
- Died: 11 May 1966 (aged 67)
- Occupations: Politician and sports official
- Relatives: Gunvor Hofmo (niece)

Rolf Hofmo (10 August 1898, in Kristiania – 11 May 1966, in Oslo) was a Norwegian politician and sports official.

He was chairman of Arbeidernes Idrettsforbund (AIF) from 1939 to 1940, and central in the merge negotiations with Norges Landsforbund for Idræt. He was arrested in December 1940, and transferred to the Sachsenhausen concentration camp in 1942. From 1946 to 1947 he was vice chairman of Norges Idrettsforbund, and manager of Statens Idrettsråd (later STUI) until his death in 1966.

He participated in the Left Communist Youth League's military strike action of 1924. He was convicted for assisting in this crime and sentenced to 75 days of prison.

He was also active in amateur wrestling in the club SK Sleipner.
