= Scissor and Thread =

- Founded: 2011
- Founder: Francis Harris, Anthony Collins
- Genre: Electronic
- Country of origin: United States
- Location: Brooklyn, New York

a Scissor and Thread is a Brooklyn-based record label, co-founded in 2011 by Francis Harris and Anthony Collins, and run alongside record store owner Shawn Schwartz and Soco Audio owner Michael Scott. Though the label spans a variety of genres, most releases have indie, ambient, and deep house influences.

== About ==
The name Scissor and Thread originates from the label's hands-on approach, both in a focus on analog and organic instrumentation and in A&R. The label only releases albums from artists who Harris has met in person, and who have visited his studio. The label has stated it aims to focus on the LP format of full albums, with their most successful releases being Harris' two LP's, "Leland" and "Minutes of Sleep," which both received strong reviews from the influential electronic music magazine Resident Advisor.

== Artists ==
- Frank and Tony
- Clockwork
- Francis Harris
- Anthony Collins
- Black Light Smoke
- Bob Moses
- Desert Sound Colony
- Lightbluemover
- Gry Bagøien
- Melquíades
- Frank & Aakmael
- Nadia Khan
