= Agnes Hvoslef =

Norwegian operatic soprano (1883–1970)

- Born: Agnes Eveline Marie Hanson; 4 April 1883; Kristiania, Norway
- Died: 2 April 1970 (aged 86); Oslo
- Occupation: Soprano singer
- Awards: King's Medal of Merit in gold (1951)

Agnes Hvoslef (4 April 1883 – 2 April 1970) was a Norwegian operatic soprano.

Specializing in Richard Wagner's female characters, she was assigned with the Royal opera in Dessau until the outbreak of World War I in 1914. She later performed at Norwegian theatres, and worked as song pedagogue in Oslo.

She was awarded the King's Medal of Merit in gold in 1951.

== Personal life ==
Born in Kristiania (now Oslo) on 4 April 1883, Hvoslef was daughter of Stener Johannes Stenerson Hanson and Agnes Dorthea Amundsen. In 1914 she married physician Hans Alfred Riddervold Hvoslef.

== Career ==
Hvoslef studied song in Copenhagen from 1898. Between 1903 and 1905 she studied with Ellen Gulbranson and Nina Grieg in Kristiania. She made her consert debut in Kristiania in 1905, a jubileum concert in the memory of composer Gustav Lange. She eventually also studied with Amalie Materna in Bayreuth.

Specializing in Richard Wagner's female characters, she had her opera debut as "Kundry" in Wagner's opera Parsifal at the Bayreuth Festival in 1906.

Assigned with the Royal opera in Dessau until 1914, her sopranic roles included "Elisabeth" in Tannhäuser, "Ortrud" in Lohengrin, and "Brünnhilde" in Die Walküre. Her performances in Norway included title roles in Verdi's Aida at Nationaltheatret, and in Bizet's Carmen at Den Nationale Scene in Bergen. In 1932 she staged Faust at Drammens Teater.

She was also a song pedagogue in Oslo.

Hvoslef was awarded the King's Medal of Merit in gold in 1951. She died in Oslo on 2 April 1970.
