= Gry Blekastad Almås =

Norwegian journalist (born 1970)

Gry Blekastad Almås (born 28 May 1970) is a Norwegian journalist.

Almås has worked as a news anchor on the evening news program Dagsrevyen, aired on the Norwegian Broadcasting Corporation. In 2010 she was appointed as a correspondent stationed in London, an office which had been unstaffed for some time. Her tenure ended in 2013.

She was educated at the University of Bergen, the Darlington College of Technology and the University of Oslo.

She is the grandchild of Czech-Norwegian translator Milada Blekastad and painter Hallvard Blekastad.

Media offices
Preceded by vacant	Norwegian Broadcasting Corporation correspondent in London; 2010–2013	Succeeded by Espen Aas
