= 1974 in Norway =

- Centuries: 18th; 19th; 20th; 21st
- Decades: 1950s; 1960s; 1970s; 1980s; 1990s
- See also: List of years in Norway

Events in the year 1974 in Norway.

== Incumbents ==
- Monarch – Olav V.
- Prime Minister – Trygve Bratteli (Labour Party)

== Events ==
- 2 January – The drilling rig "Transocean 3" sinks in the North Sea.
- 1 February – Lillehammer affair: Five Israeli Mossad agents are sentenced to prison terms for the assassination of Ahmed Bouchiki. The prison terms ranged from two and a half to five years, although all the agents were eventually released within 22 months and deported back to Israel.
- 15 September – The wreck of the Danish slave ship Fredensborg, which sank during a storm in 1768, is discovered off the coast of Tromøya.
- 31 October – Parliament rejects a bill on abortion.
- 20 December – Kirsten Ohm is named by the King-in-Council as Norway's first female ambassador, assuming office in 1975.

=== Music ===
- Inger Lise Rypdal and Benny Borg win the 1973 Spellemannprisen in the female and male vocalist categories respectively. Christiania Jazzband, Saft, Torkil Bye/Brynjar Hoff, Lillebjørn Nilsen, Bjørn Sand/Totto Osvold and Oddvar Nygaards Kvartett also receive the award. Dizzie Tunes win in the category "Music for children" and Sigbjørn Bernhoft Osa win the Special Award.

=== Literature ===
- Haiene, novel by Jens Bjørneboe

== Notable births ==
=== January – March ===
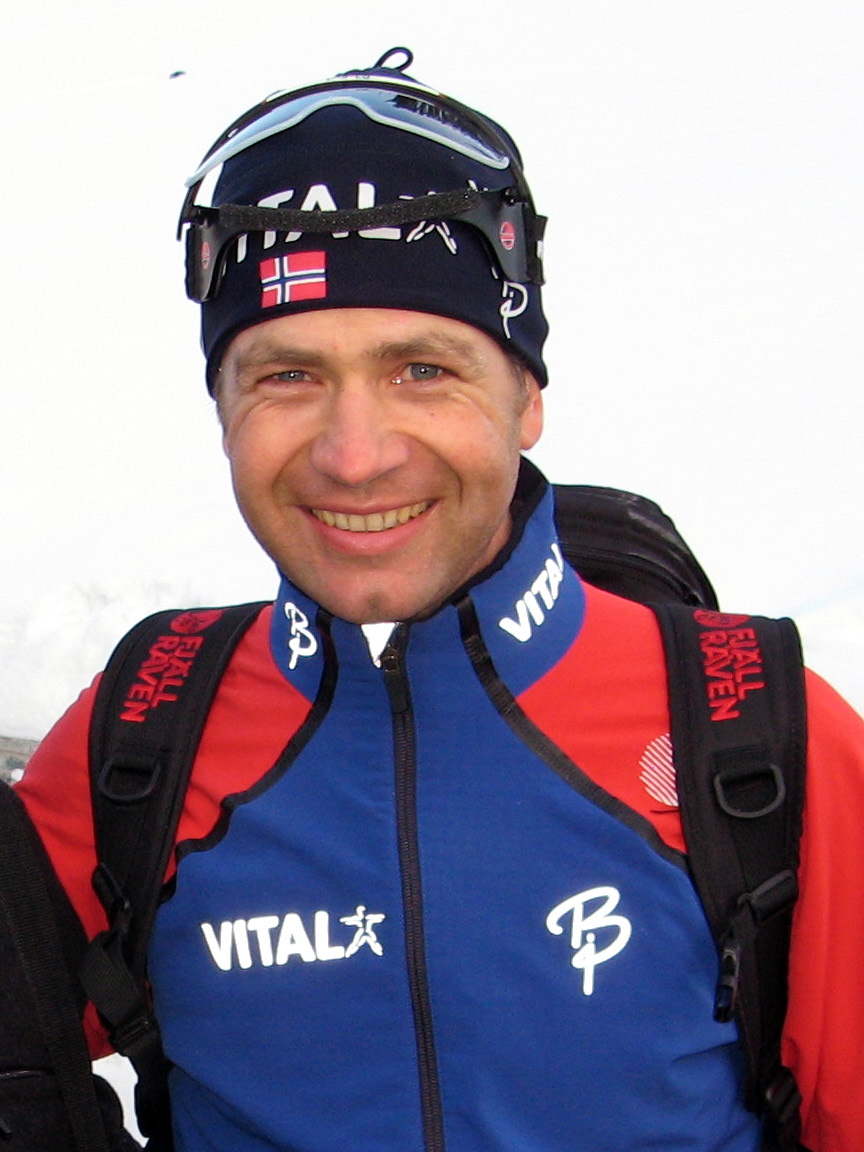
Ole Einar Bjørndalen

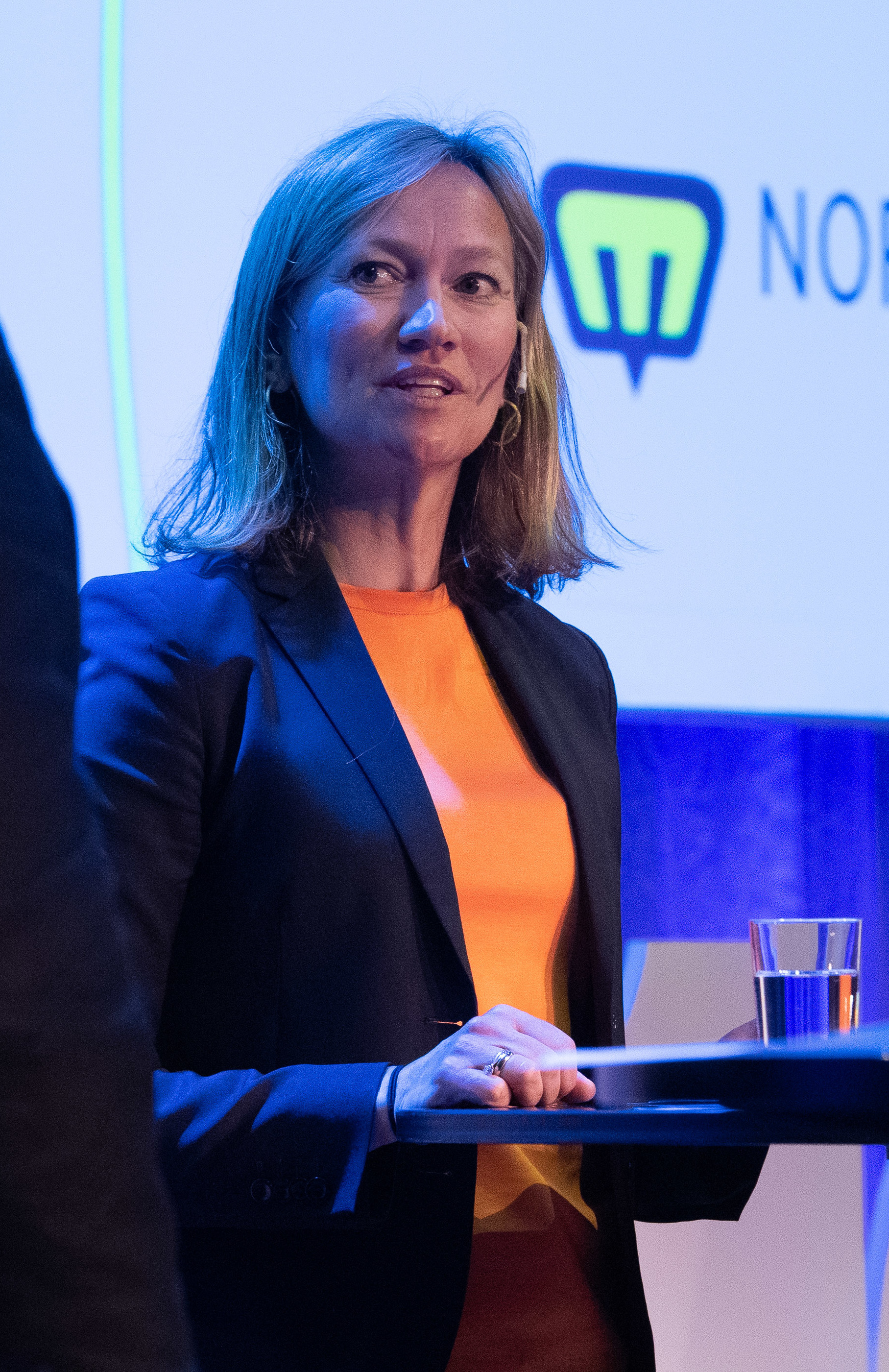
Siv Juvik Tveitnes

- 4 January – Hild Sofie Tafjord, musician
- 4 January – Sjur Miljeteig, trumpet player and composer
- 27 January – Ole Einar Bjørndalen, biathlete
- 28 January – Kari Traa, freestyle skier
- 31 January – Kristine Duvholt Havnås, handball player.
- 15 February – Lars Ramslie, writer
- 16 February – Asle Toje, political scientist
- 13 March – Rita Skjærvik, politician
- 13 March – Siv Juvik Tveitnes, media executive.
- 17 March – Bjarte Breiteig, short story writer
- 18 March – Anne Tønnessen, footballer.
- 28 March – Marianne Sivertsen Næss, politician.
- 30 March – Sigbjørn Gjelsvik, politician.
- 31 March – Linda Konttorp, sailor.

=== April – June ===
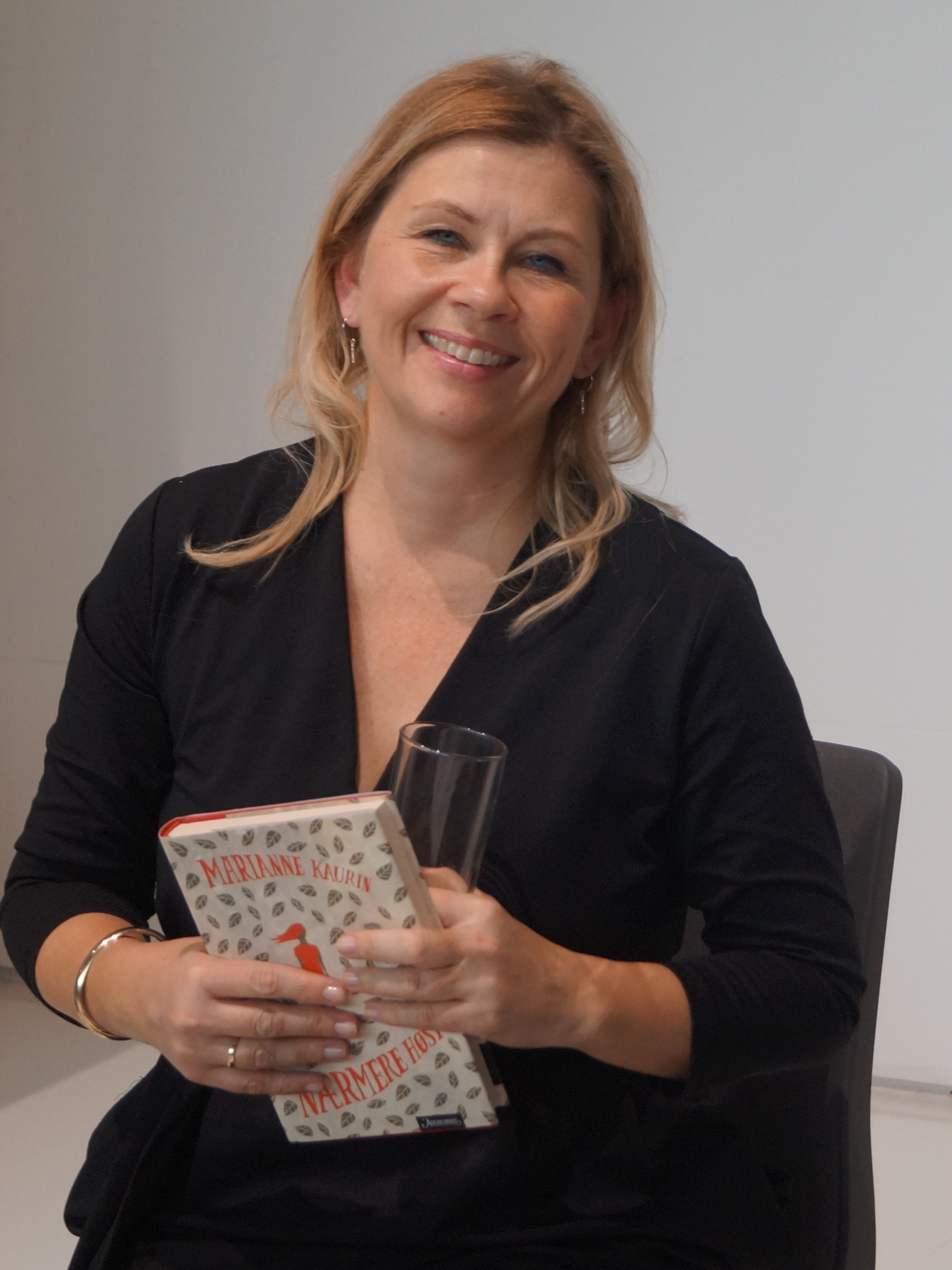
Marianne Kaurin

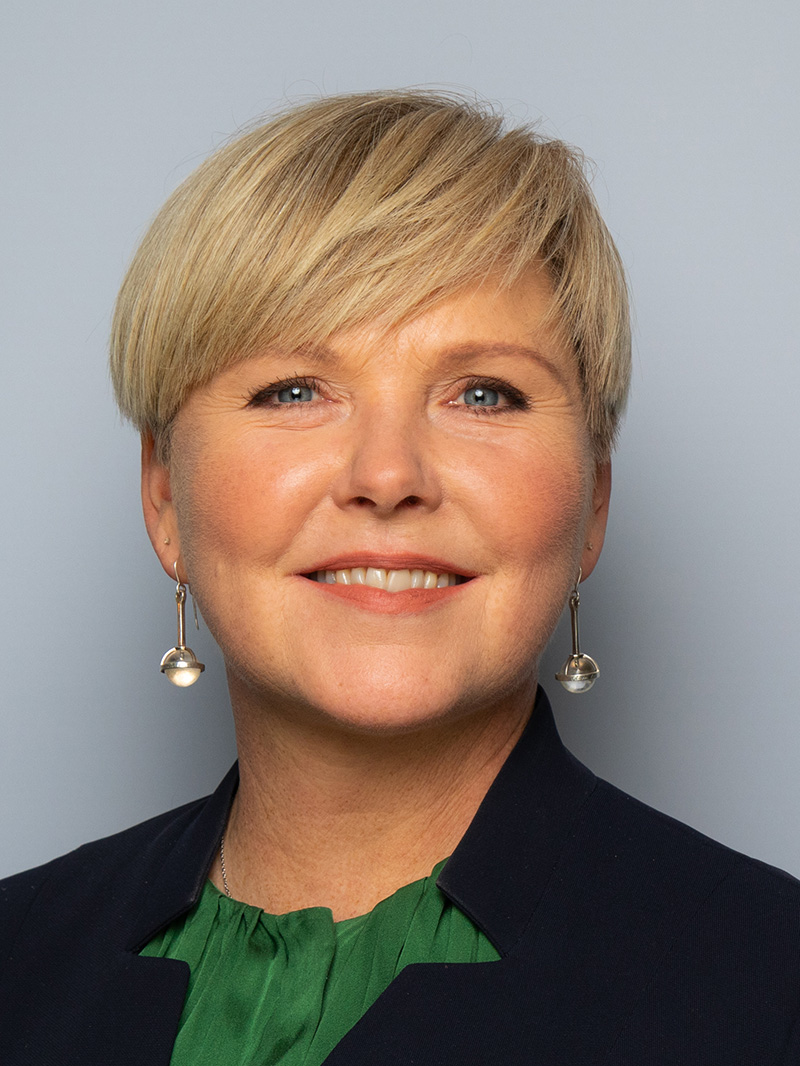
Anne Beathe Tvinnereim

- 2 April – Håvard Bakke, actor
- 5 April – Håkon Øvreås, poet
- 8 April – Lasse Ottesen, ski jumper
- 10 April – Beate S. Lech, singer, composer
- 1 May – Mari Sundli Tveit, educationalist and research executive.
- 14 May – Kaia Huuse, singer and songwriter
- 18 May – Marianne Kaurin, writer.
- 22 May – Anne Beathe Tvinnereim, diplomat and politician.
- 24 May – Thorbjørn Harr, actor
- 29 May – Henning H. Bergsvåg, poet
- 13 June – Noman Mubashir, journalist
- 19 June – Mari Rege, economist and university economics professor
- 24 June – Tom Cato Karlsen, politician
- 26 June – Thomas Hansvoll, boxer

=== July – September ===
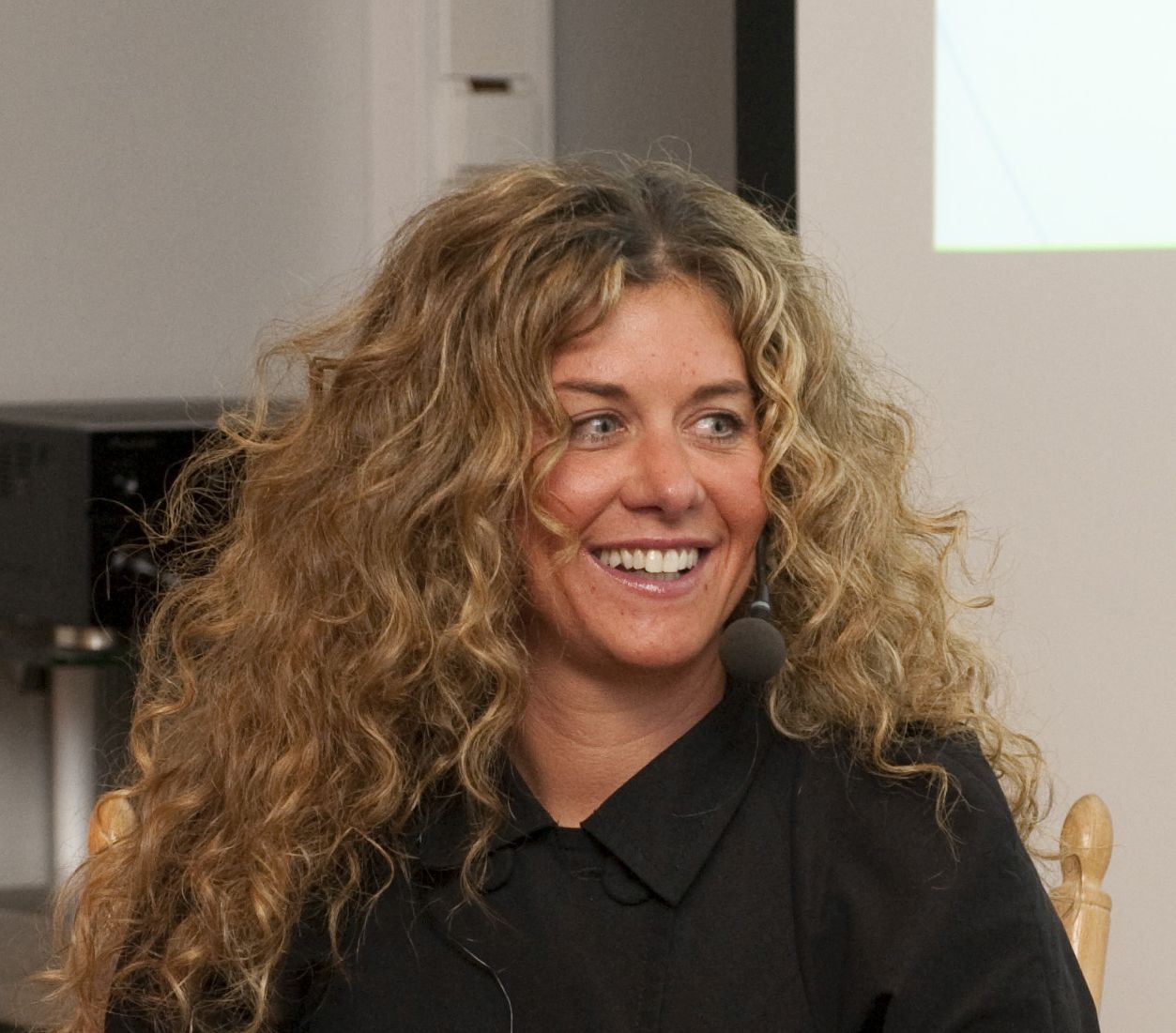
Cecilie Skog

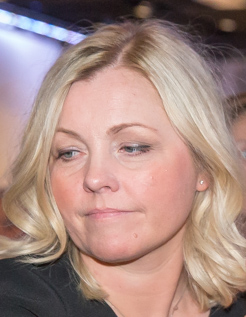
Kjersti Stenseng

- 7 July – Ingeborg Arvola, writer.
- 13 July – Sheila Barth Stanford, chess player.
- 20 July – Monica Nielsen, politician.
- 23 July – Bente Nordby, footballer
- 2 August – Karianne Bråthen, politician.
- 4 August – Lene Ask, illustrator and comics creator
- 9 August – Cecilie Skog, adventurer.
- 14 August – Kari Stai, illustrator and children's writer
- 1 September – Hilde Østbø, handball player.
- 4 September – Kjersti Stenseng, politician
- 10 September – Lasse Marhaug, musician
- 14 September – Anne Hytta, folk musician
- 14 September – Mette Solli, kickboxer.
- 25 September – Bente Elin Lilleøkseth, politician
- 29 September – Henriette Steenstrup, actress, comedian and scriptwriter.

=== October – December ===
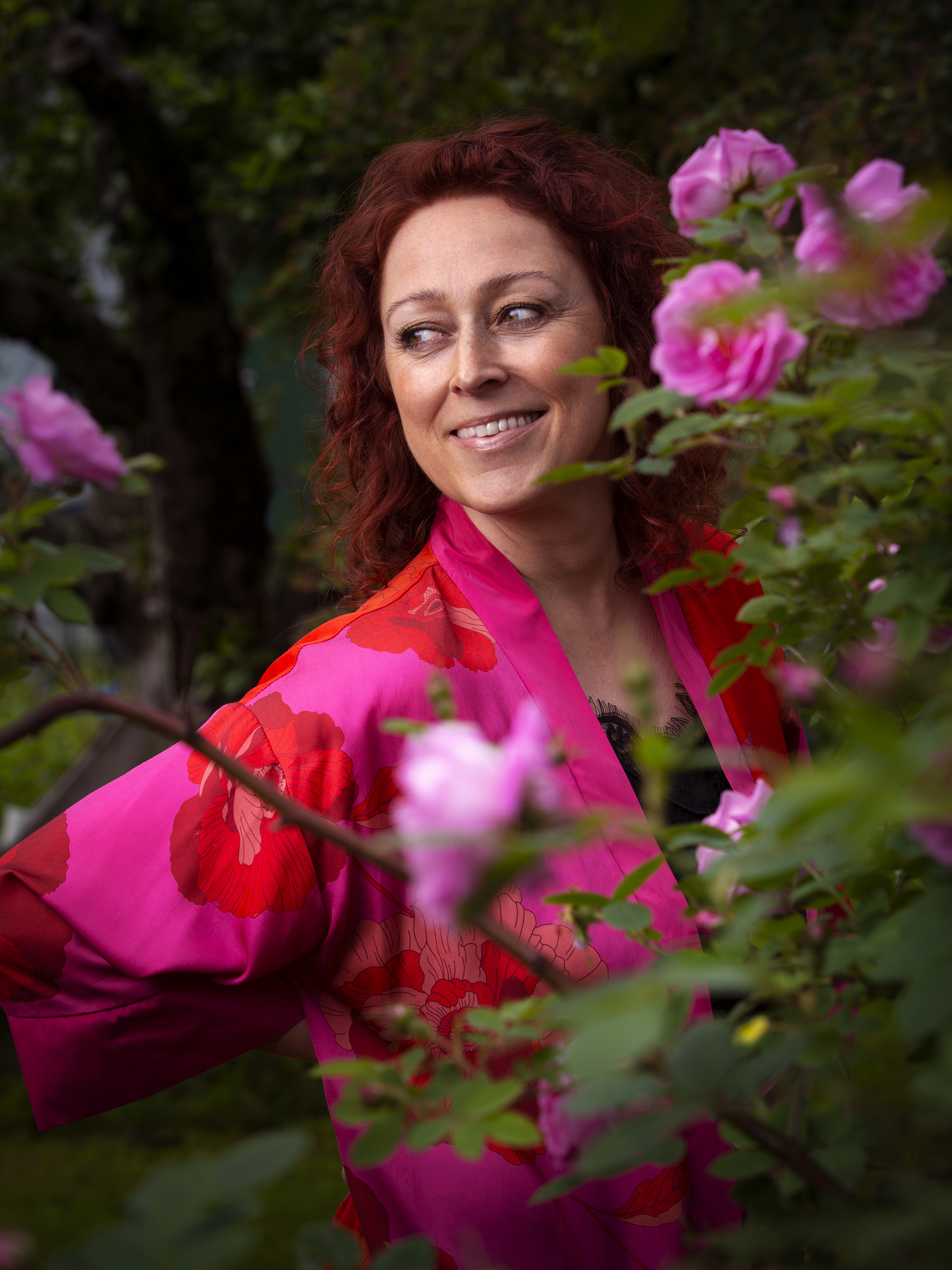
Camilla Granlien

- 11 October – Terje Håkonsen, snowboarder
- 31 October – Eskil Vogt, film director and screenwriter.
- 3 November – Camilla Granlien, folk singer
- 3 November – Martinus Grov, archer
- 9 November – Silje Wergeland, singer and songwriter.
- 19 November – Trond Lode, politician
- 1 December – Kari Solem, handball player.
- 2 December – Trude Gimle, alpine skier.
- 4 December – Vera Micaelsen, television journalist, writer (died 2018)
- 9 December – Daniel Franck, snowboarder
- 9 December – Tone Mostraum, actress.
- 12 December – Torger Nergård, curler
- 17 December – Anders Aarum, jazz musician
- 24 December – Paal Nilssen-Love, jazz musician
- 29 December – Andrine Flemmen, alpine skier
- 29 December – Ruth Mariann Hop, politician

=== Full date missing ===
- Siv Elin Hansen, politician
- Liv Lønnum, politician
- Iren Opdahl, politician
- Thea Selliaas Thorsen, classicist

== Notable deaths ==
=== January – June ===
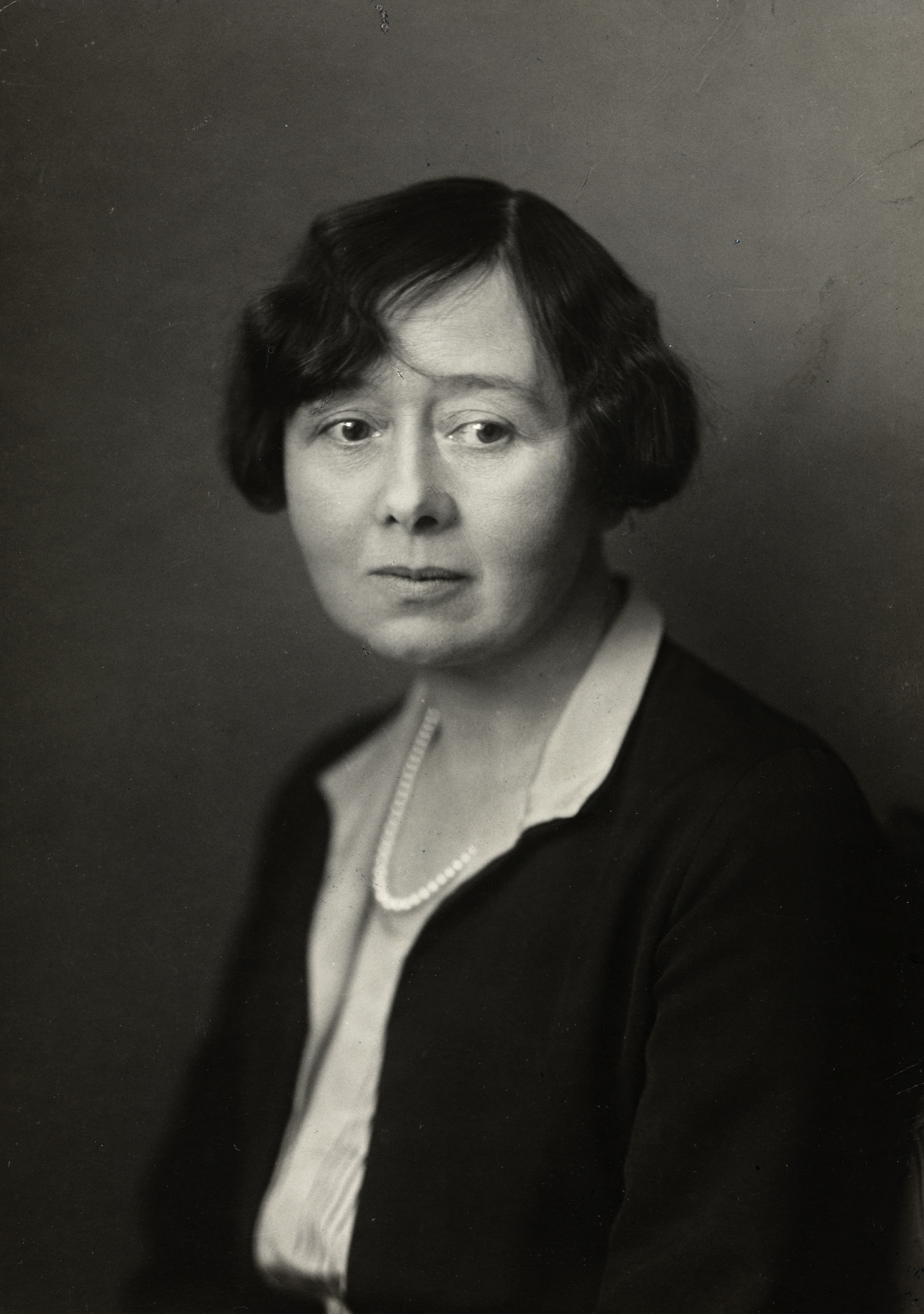
Cora Sandel

- 16 January – Johannes Olai Olsen, politician (b.1895)
- 7 February – Sigge Johannessen, gymnast and Olympic silver medallist (b.1884)
- 11 February – Alfhild Stormoen, actress (b.1883)
- 14 February – Halfdan Schjøtt, sailor and Olympic gold medallist (b.1893)
- 4 March – Arne Skaug, politician and Minister (b.1906)
- 3 April – Cora Sandel, writer (b.1880)
- 19 May – Anne Holtsmark, philologist (b.1896)
- 22 May – Einar Amdahl, theologian (b.1888)
- 23 May – Leif Høegh, shipowner (b.1896)
- 26 May – Ragnar Kalheim, trade unionist (b.1926)
- 8 June – Bjørn Trumpy, physicist (b.1900)
- 14 June – Gabriel Thorstensen, gymnast and Olympic gold medallist (b.1888)
- 19 June – Aasmund Brynildsen, essayist, biographer, magazine editor and publishing house consultant (b.1917)

=== July – December ===
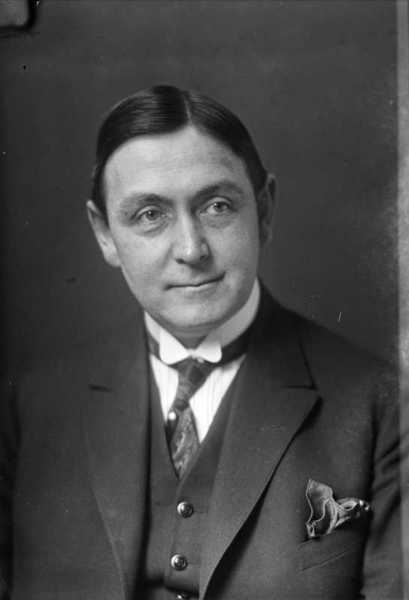
Francis Bull in 1925

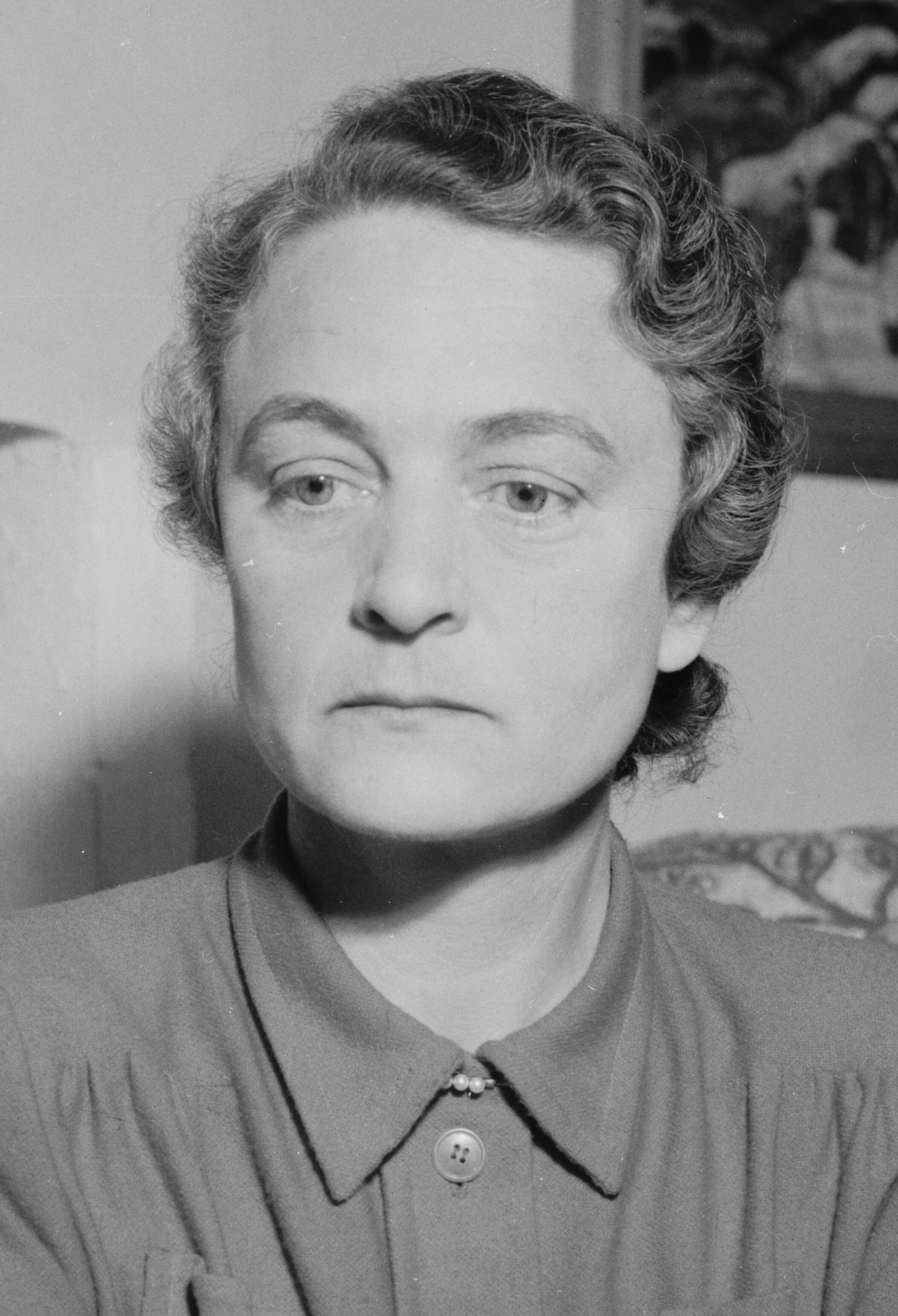
Kirsten Hansteen

- 4 July – Francis Bull, literary historian, professor, essayist and magazine editor (b.1887).
- 12 July – Sonja Aase Ludvigsen, politician and Minister (b.1928)
- 19 August – Harald K. Schjelderup, psychologist (b.1895)
- 20 August – Haldor Bjerkeseth, politician (b.1883)
- 22 August – Sverre Hansen, international soccer player and Olympic bronze medallist (b.1913)
- 25 September – Hartmann Bjørnsen, gymnast and Olympic gold medallist (b.1889)
- 29 September – Arthur Ruud, trade unionist, sports administrator (born 1905).
- 11 October – Tormod Normann, lawyer, competitive swimmer and sports administrator (born 1905).
- 11 October – Axel Heiberg Stang, politician and Minister (b.1904).
- 18 October – Anders Lange, politician (b.1904)
- 28 October – Ørnulf Bast, sculptor (b.1907)
- 31 October – Olav Gurvin, musicologist (b.1893)
- 13 November – Jens Lunde, politician (b.1884)
- 15 November – Jonas Henry Støre, business executive (b.1888)
- 17 November – Kirsten Hansteen, politician and Minister, first female member of cabinet in Norway (b.1903)
- 18 November – Gunnar Mykstu, politician (b.1909)
- 17 December – Jørgen Bru, sport shooter (b.1881)
- 31 December – Sverre Petterssen, meteorologist (b.1898)

=== Full date unknown ===
- Halfdan Haneborg Hansen, military officer, Milorg pioneer and businessman (born 1890).
- Einar Høiland, meteorologist (b.1907)
- Nils Voss, gymnast and Olympic gold medallist (b.1886)
