= 1977 in Norway =

- Centuries: 18th; 19th; 20th; 21st
- Decades: 1950s; 1960s; 1970s; 1980s; 1990s
- See also: List of years in Norway

Events in the year 1977 in Norway.

== Incumbents ==
- Monarch – Olav V.
- Prime Minister – Odvar Nordli (Labour Party)

== Events ==
- 1 January – Norway established a 200-nautical-mile Exclusive Economic Zone (EEZ), greatly expanding Norwegian control over fisheries and marine resources off its cost.
- 12 September – The 1977 Parliamentary election takes place.
- 22 April – Ekofisk oil field blowout: an oil well blowout occurred at the Ekofisk Bravo platform, due to an incorrectly installed downhole safety valve. At an estimated 80,000–126,000 barrels (12,700–20,000 m^{3}) total, this is the largest blowout in the North Sea.
- 24–27 February – The Biathlon World Championships 1977 take place in Vingrom, Norway.

== Notable births ==
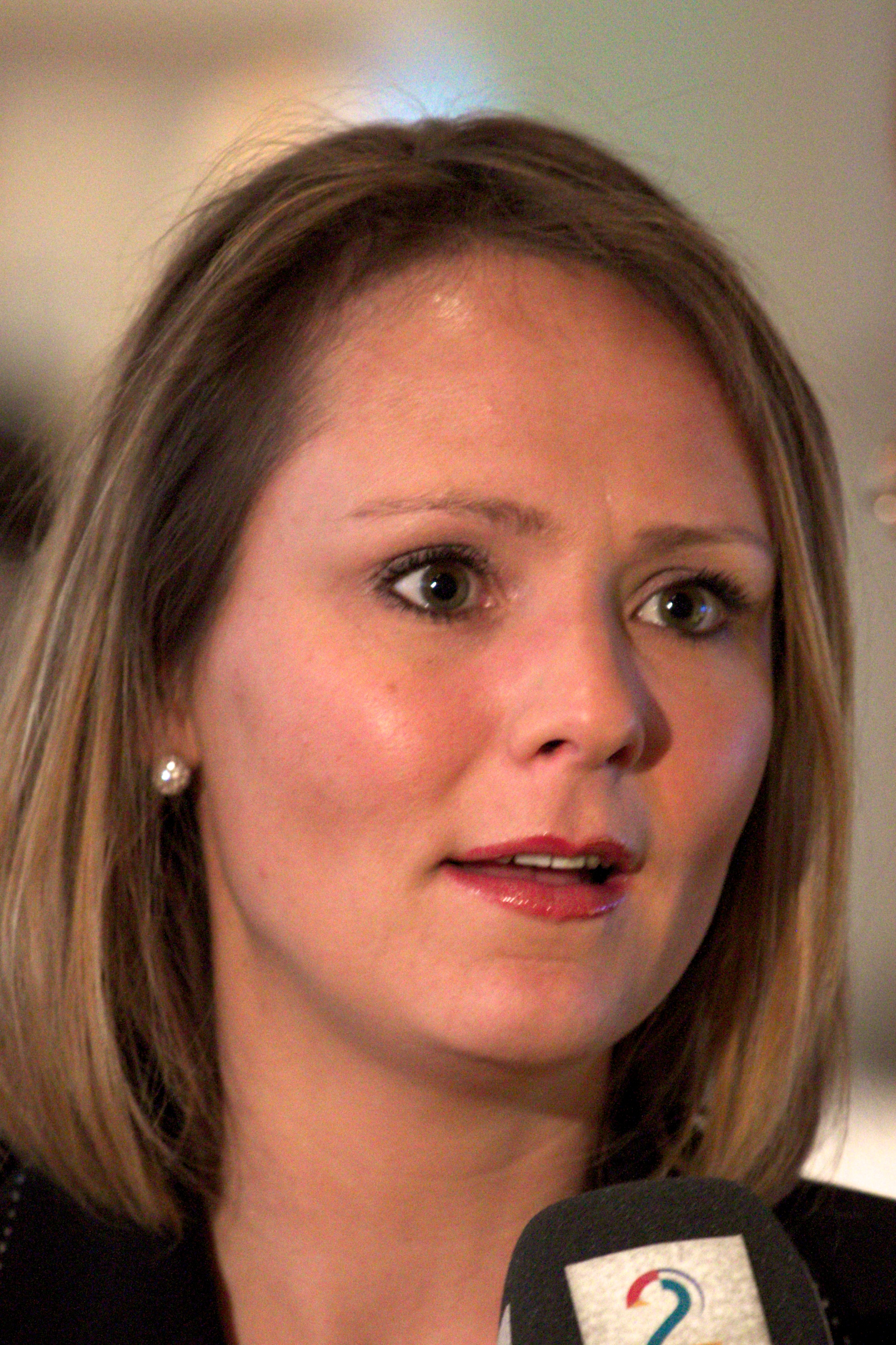
Linda Hofstad Helleland

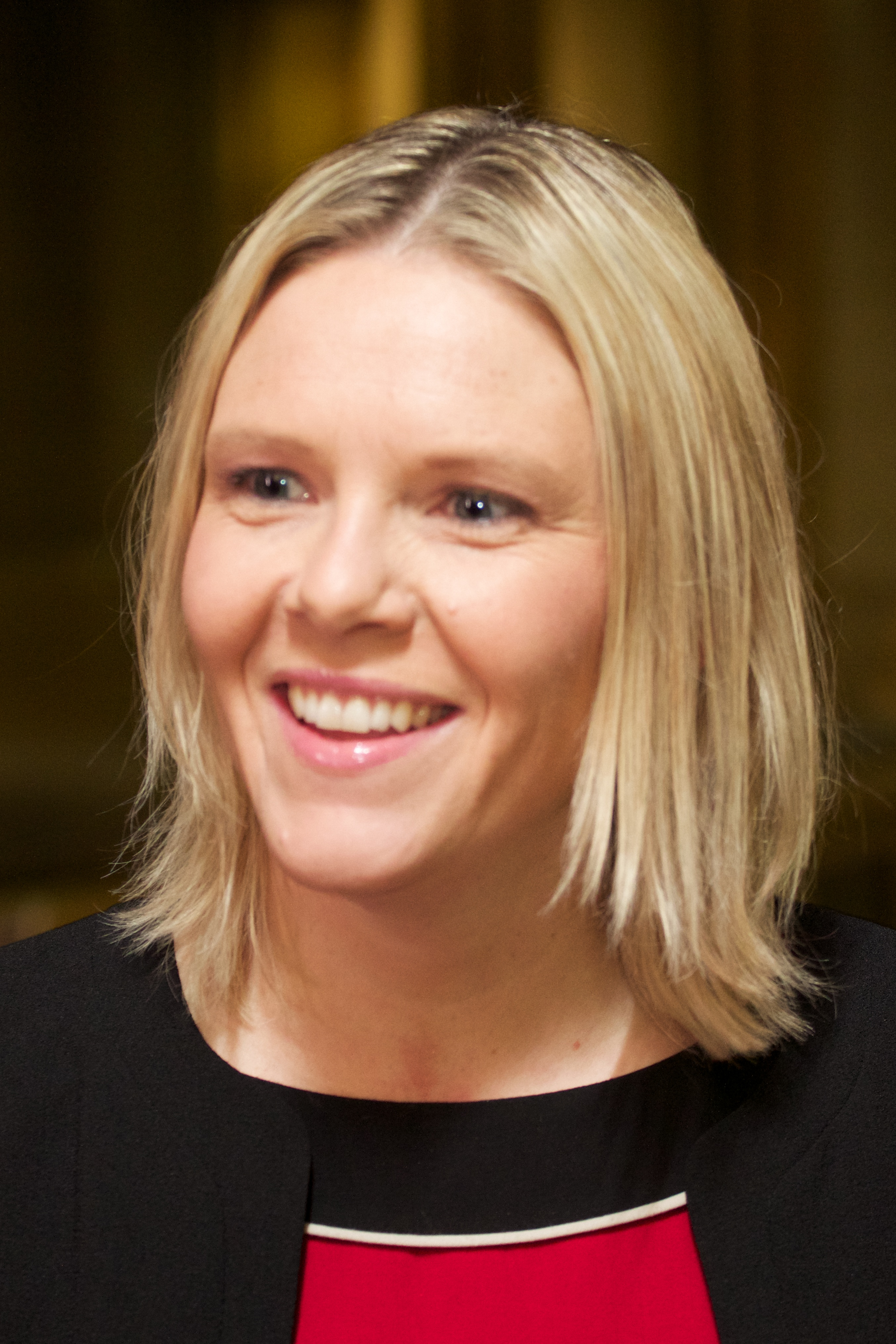
Sylvi Listhaug

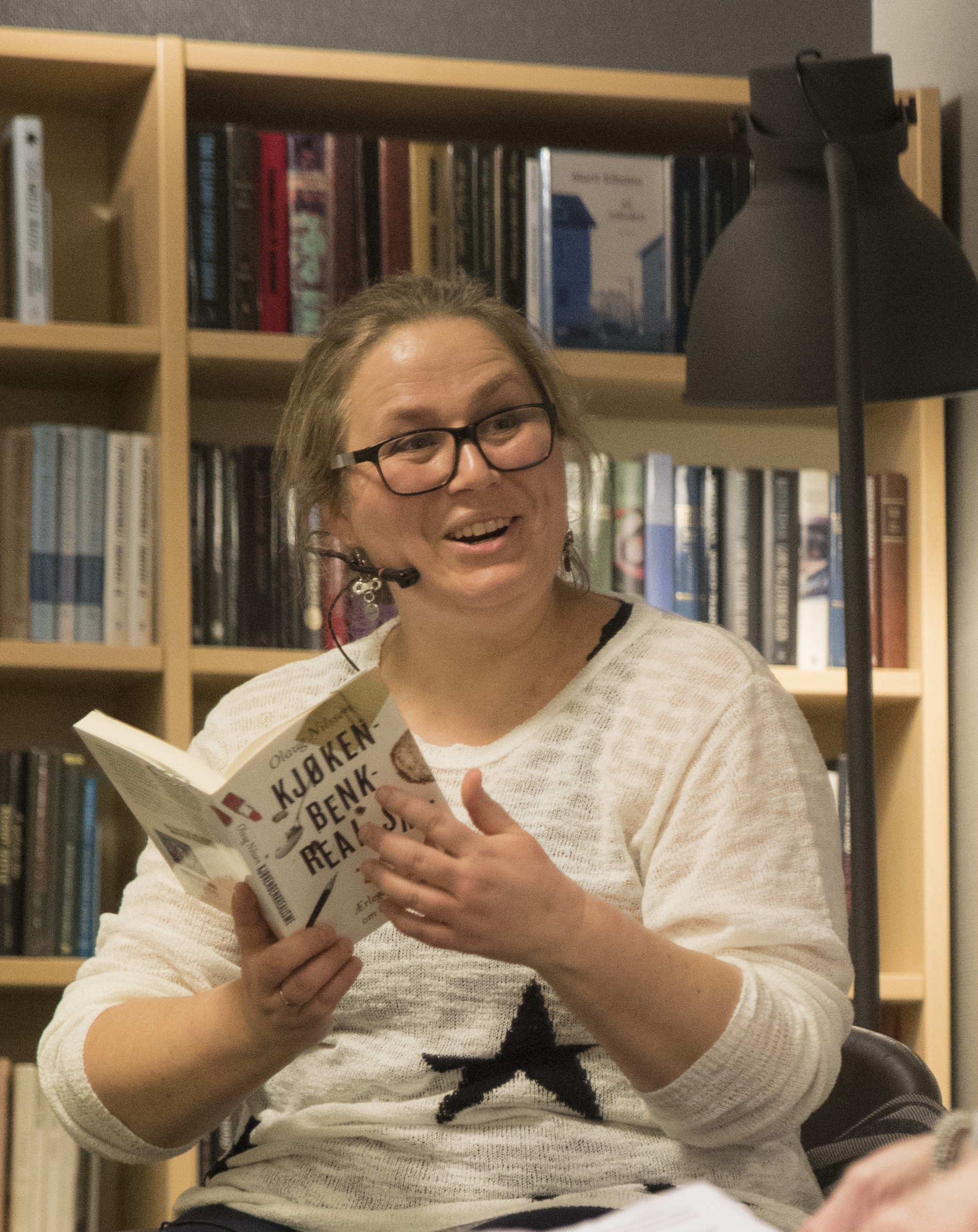
Olaug Nilssen

- 11 January – Kine Asper Vistnes, trade unionist.
- 17 January – Sverre Rotevatn, Nordic combined skier.
- 25 February – Ingrid Sternhoff, footballer.
- 7 March – Pål Grotnes, ice hockey player.
- 7 March – Mia Hundvin, handball player.
- 15 March – Anita Tomulevski, gymnast.
- 22 March – Linda Ørmen, footballer.
- 30 March – Silvia K. Kosmo, politician.
- 11 April – Pål Berrefjord, politician
- 19 April – Kristin Bekkevold, footballer.
- 22 April – Linn Torp, cyclist.
- 2 May – Pernille Holmboe, model
- 5 May – Silje Jørgensen, footballer.
- 18 May – Bjarne Solbakken, alpine skier.
- 2 June – Alexandra Beverfjord, crime fiction writer, journalist and newspaper editor.
- 6 June – Trude Gundersen, taekwondo athlete.
- 30 June – Zahid Ali, stand-up comedian
- 30 June – Kjersti Horn, theater director.
- 24 July – Anita Rapp, footballer.
- 16 August – Sigmund Løvåsen, novelist and playwright.
- 20 August – Henning Stensrud, ski jumper.
- 26 August – Linda Cathrine Hofstad Helleland, politician.
- 6 September – Mari Skurdal, journalist and newspaper editor.
- 12 September – Pia Tjelta, actress.
- 30 September – Audun Lysbakken, politician.
- 7 October – Vegard Arnhoff, sailor.
- 23 October – Jarle Andhøy, adventurer and sailboat-skipper
- 12 November – Anne Molin Kongsgård, snowboarder.
- 21 November – Annie, pop artist and DJ
- 3 December – Jennie Johnsen, politician
- 25 December – Sylvi Listhaug, politician.
- 28 December – Olaug Nilssen, writer.

== Notable deaths ==
- 17 January – Erling Fredriksfryd, politician (b.1905)
- 1 February – Edvard Hambro, politician and 25th President of the United Nations General Assembly (b.1911)
- 8 February – Eivind Groven, composer and music-theorist (b.1901)
- 3 March – Kai Knudsen, politician (b.1903)
- 7 March – Jørgen Leonard Firing, politician (b.1894)
- 22 March – Alfred Nilsen, politician (b.1892)
- 27 May – Kristian Birger Gundersen, politician (b.1907)
- 6 June – Olaf Fredrik Watnebryn, politician (b.1908)
- 13 June – Olav Aslakson Versto, politician (b.1892)
- 23 June – Asbjørn Solberg, politician (b.1893)
- 1 July – Torvald Kvinlaug, politician (b.1911)
- 2 July – Christian Schweigaard Stang, linguistics researcher and professor (b.1900)
- 7 July – Nils Kristian Lysø, politician and Minister (b.1905)
- 13 July – Edgar Christensen, boxer (b.1905)
- 14 July – Birger Bergersen, politician and minister (b.1891)
- 24 July – Sigrid Sundby, speed skater (b.1942).
- 2 August – Alfred Sigurd Nilsen, politician (b.1891)
- 5 August – Gunvor Galtung Haavik, interpreter charged with espionage (b.1912)
- 17 August – Harald Økern, Nordic combined skier (b.1898)
- 2 October – Odd Frantzen, soccer player and Olympic bronze medallist (b.1913)
- 18 October – Kristian Hauger, pianist, orchestra leader and composer (b. 1905).
- 4 November – Frede Castberg, jurist (b.1893)
- 4 November – Sigurd Lund Hamran, politician (b.1902)
- 5 November – Gunnar Nordbye, United States federal judge (b.1888)
- 15 November – Olaf Johannessen, rifle shooter (b.1890)
- 24 November – Reidar Dahl, jurist and sports official, president of the Football Association of Norway (born 1893).
- 5 December – Jon Mårdalen, cross country skier (b.1895)
- 25 December – Harald Strøm, speed skater and World Champion (b.1897).

=== Full date missing ===
- Reidar Eriksen, trade unionist and politician (b.1894)
- Lars Fletre, sculptor (b.1904)
- John Gunnarsson Helland, Hardanger fiddle maker (b.1897)
- Kåre Jonsborg, painter and textile artist (b.1912)
- Finn Nagell, military officer, Milorg pioneer, economist and businessperson (born 1899).
- Ola Solberg, newspaper editor and politician (b. 1886)
