= Myhren =

Myhren is a surname. Notable people with the surname include:

- Dagne Groven Myhren (born 1940), Norwegian literature researcher, folk musician, and educator
- Øyonn Groven Myhren (born 1969), Norwegian traditional folk musician and kveder
