= Bergsvåg =

Bergsvåg is a Norwegian surname. Notable people with the surname include:

- Arne Bergsvåg (born 1958), Norwegian politician
- Henning H. Bergsvåg (born 1974), Norwegian poet and librarian
