= UiS Business School =

Business school in Stavanger, Norway

Coordinates: 58.9385°N 5.6966°E

The UiS Business School (Norwegian: Handelshøyskolen ved UiS) is a business school situated in Stavanger, Norway, and a faculty under the University of Stavanger. The business school is one of the largest institutions in Norway educating students at the masters level in business administration.

== History ==
The origin for the UiS Business School was the establishment of the Rogaland Regional College in Stavanger in 1969 with a two-year program in Business Administration. The regional College became the University College of Rogaland in 1985 and in 1995 changed the name to Høgskolen i Stavanger/Stavanger University College (HiS). The University of Stavanger UiS was established in 2005 when the former Høgskolen i Stavanger (HiS) received university status.

== Staff & Students ==
The UiS Business School consists of about 75 faculty members and staff, 750 undergraduate students, 300 graduate students, 100 Executive MBA students, and 22 PhD candidates.

== Departments ==
- Department of Innovation, Management and Marketing
- Department of Economics and Finance
- Department of Accounting and Law

== Research centers and Research groups ==
- Centre for Innovation Research
- Energy and Commodity Finance Research group
- Behavioural Economics and Finance Research group
- Synapse lab
- Capital markets accounting research

== Educational Programmes ==
The UiS Business School offer Bachelor Programmes in Business Administration, Accounting & Auditing, and Law and Master of Science Programmes in Business Administration, Accounting and Auditing, and Law. In addition, the UIS Business School also offers an Executive MBA programme.

== Notable faculty and alumni ==
=== Academics ===
- Mari Rege
- Ola Kvaløy
- Klaus Mohn
- Ragnar Tveterås
- Rune Dahl Fitjar
- Tom Broekel
- Marte Cecilie Wilhelmsen Solheim
- Kenneth Henning Wathne
- Bjørn Terje Asheim
- Benn Folkvord
- Bård Misund
- Tatiana Iakovleva
- Bernt Arne Ødegaard
- Aslaug Mikkelsen
