= Helge Eide =

Helge Eide may refer to:

- Helge Eide (businessman)
- Helge Eide (politician)
