= Berrefjord =

Berrefjord is a Norwegian surname. Berefjord written also Berrefjord is a fjord in Norway. Notable people with the surname include:

- Pål Berrefjord (born 1977), Norwegian politician
- Oddvar Berrefjord (1918–1999), Norwegian jurist and politician
