= Hande Eslen-Ziya =

Turkish sociologist and gender studies scholar (born 1976)

- Born: 1976 (age 49–50); Turkey

Academic background
- Education: Boğaziçi University; Polish Academy of Sciences

Academic work
- Discipline: Sociology
- Institutions: University of Stavanger

Hande Eslen-Ziya (born 1976) is a Turkish-born, Norway-based sociologist and psychologist. She is Professor of Sociology at the University of Stavanger in Norway. She has an established interest in gender and social inequalities, transnational organizations and social activism, and has a substantial portfolio of research in this field. Her research has been published in Gender, Work and Organisation, Emotion, Space and Society, Social Movement Studies, European Journal of Women's Studies, Culture, Health and Sexuality, Leadership, Men and Masculinities, and Social Politics, as well as in other internationally recognized journals. She is known for her work on the concept of "troll science," that she describes as an alternative discourse created by right-wing populist ideologies such as the anti-gender movement in opposition to established scholarly discourse.

== Career ==
She earned a BSc (1997) and an MSc (1999) in psychology at Boğaziçi University, a PhD in sociology at the Polish Academy of Sciences (2008) and a habilitation by the Turkish Higher Education Council (2015). She was awarded Young Outstanding Researcher by the University of Stavanger (2020).

She worked at the psychology and sociology departments (full time and part time) of several Turkish universities (Haliç University, Bahçeşehir University, Boğaziçi University, Yeditepe University and Okan University) and the University of KwaZulu-Natal in South Africa, before joining the University of Brighton. In 2018 she joined the University of Stavanger as an associate professor, and in 2020 she was promoted to professor of sociology. She was the co-founder and Director of the Populism, Anti-Gender and Democracy Research Group https://www.uis.no/en/research/centre-for-gender-studies/media-studies/uis-research-group-on-populism-anti-gender-and (2020 - 2024) at the University of Stavanger.

In her research she focuses on gender and social inequality, transnational organizations and social movements and activism. She has researched the use of discursive tools by illiberal regimes, especially in Turkey. She is known for her work on how right-wing populist ideologies such as the anti-gender movement create an alternative "troll science" discourse that stands in opposition to recognized scholarship.

Recently her work is particularly known for its critical focus on masculinist restoration, digital misogyny, and state-sanctioned gendered violence. Her current work examines the affective and visual cultures of the manosphere, politically incorrect humour as a tool of digital hate, and the epistemic, symbolic, and structural forms of online violence targeting scholars. https://kjonnsforskning.no/en/2025/08/online-violence-silencing-academics Her research, often centered on Turkey and Norway, extends to global feminist movements and transnational anti-gender mobilizations. She is also engaged in a Hoziron Europe SKILLS4JUSTICE https://skills4justice.eu project on migration, labour markets, and skills mismatches, which investigates the integration of migrant workers in health and social care sectors.

She is the co-editor of (Un)Silencing Academia in Times of Epistemic Conflicts Navigating Online Violence (Routledge, 2026) and Populism and Science in Europe (Palgrave Macmillan, 2022).

== Books ==
- "(Un) Silencing Academia in Times of Epistemic Conflicts: Navigating Online Violence", Taylor & Francis (2026). https://www.routledge.com/UnSilencing-Academia-in-Times-of-Epistemic-Conflicts-Navigating-Online-Violence/Giorgi-Eslen-Ziya/p/book/9781032894201.
- "Populism and Science in Europe", Springer, Palgrave Macmillan (2022). https://link.springer.com/book/10.1007/978-3-030-97535-7
- The Aesthetics of Global Protest: Visual Culture and Communication, Amsterdam University Press (2019)
- Politics and Gender Identity in Turkey: Centralised Islam for Socio-Economic Control, Routledge (2018)
- The Social Construction and Developmental Trajectories of Masculinities, Istanbul Bilgi Universitesi Yayınları (2017)
