= Emanuela de Paula =

Brazilian model (born 1989)

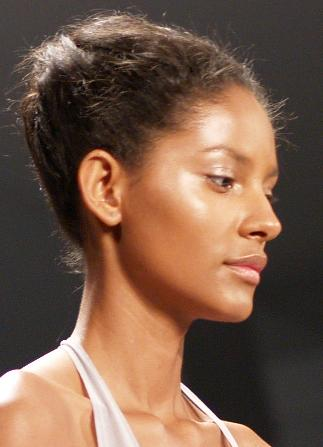
- Emanuela in 2006
- Born: 25 April 1989 (age 37); Cabo de Santo Agostinho, Pernambuco, Brazil
- Occupation: Model
- Modeling information
- Height: 1.79 m (5 ft 10 1/2 in)
- Hair color: Dark brown
- Eye color: Dark brown
- Agency: Women Management (New York); Elite Model Management (Paris, London); d'management group (Milan); View Management (Barcelona); Munich Models (Munich)

Emanuela de Paula (born 25 April 1989) is a Brazilian model. She has been the face of UK retailer Next for the past two seasons and can be seen in the 2009 Pirelli Calendar. She has also replaced Pernille Holmboe as the new model for the Swedish clothing store Gina Tricot.

== Biography ==
Emanuela de Paula was born to a white Brazilian mother and an Afro Brazilian father. "I am what we call 'mulata'". She has also stated she is one of the few black women in the fashion industry. She is of African, Dutch and Native Brazilian descent.

== Career ==
She first took an interest in modeling at the age of nine and quickly booked a supermarket advertisement. By the age of 15, de Paula was visiting modeling agencies. She signed with the Marilyn Agency, the first agency she visited. Her first season was in New York City in 2005, and yielded runway work for the likes of Ralph Lauren, Bill Blass and Zac Posen, as well as a story for W, photographed by Michael Thompson. Her other runway credits include Bottega Veneta, Shiatzy Chen, Alexandre Herchcovitch, Colcci, Diane von Furstenberg, Amir Slama, Lacoste, Rebecca Taylor, Tommy Hilfiger, and Yigal Azrouël, and she has appeared in campaigns for Alexandre Herchcovitch, Bloomingdales, DKNY, GAP, H&M, Saks, J.Crew, Hush Puppies, MAC, C&A, Sephora, Tommy Hilfiger, Top Shop, and Victoria's Secret. Her editorials include Allure, French, Marie Claire, Vogue, and Women's Wear Daily.

By the age of 20, de Paula had landed two makeup campaigns: MAC Barbie Collection and Prescriptives. She walked in the Victoria's Secret Fashion Show in 2008, 2010, and 2011. According to Forbes, de Paula ranked the eleventh highest paid supermodel for 2009, earning $2.5 million. She has walked runway for São Paulo Fashion Week, home to the largest fashion shows in Brazil.

She has been praised by Naomi Campbell and Anna Wintour of Vogue.

She was in the Next autumn/winter 2010 campaign and in its TV advertisement that launched on 10 September, alongside Jon Kortajarena.

As of 2014, de Paula is represented by The Society Management.
