= Anne Hytta =

- Born: 14 September 1974 (age 51); Sauland, Telemark
- Origin: Norway
- Genres: Traditional folk music Medieval music
- Occupations: Musician; composer
- Instruments: Fiddle; Violin; Hardingfele
- Website: www.annehytta.com

Anne Hytta (born 14 September 1974 in Sauland, Norway) is a Norwegian traditional folk musician playing the Hardingfele.

== Biography ==
Hytta has been training hardingfele with Einar Løndal (1914–2005) and Knut Buen (b. 1948) among others. She writes and arranges new music at the intersection of Traditional folk music, Contemporary classical music and other modal traditional folk music traditions. Her main project next to playing solo fiddle is in the trio Slagr, initiated by Hytta in 2003. The trio has written and performed two commissioned works, the last, straum, stille (stream, silent), was performed at the Osa Festival in 2008. Their debut album Solaris, was released in 2007, and the second album Straum, Stille in 2011. Slagr received ensemble support from the Norsk kulturråd (Arts Council Norway).

Hytta is an experienced performer in international tradition music projects, and has worked with traditional musicians from Iran, Pakistan, Afghanistan, India, Tanzania, Romania, Hellas, Sverige, Frankrike, England, and Brasil among others. The interest in modal traditional music opened for a scholarship from the Fond for utøvende kunstnere (Fund for performing artists) to study with Ross Daly, a musician and music theorist living in Crete.

She plays medieval string instruments in the medieval music ensemble Kalenda Maya. Together with Synnøve S. Bjørset and Åse Teigland she has prepared a consert for three hardingfele soloists, Dei beste damene.

== Discography ==
=== Solo albums ===
- 2006: Dag, Kveld, Natt (ta:lik - TA30CD)
- 2014: Draumsyn(Carpe Diem)
- 2017: Strimur (ta:lik - TA167CD)

=== Collaborations ===
With Slagr

- 2007: Solaris (NorCD - NORCD 0771)
- 2011: Straum, Stille (Ozella - OZ 033 CD)
- 2012: Softspeaker (Atterklang - AKLANG305), with Andreas Ulvo
- 2013: Songs By Geirr Tveitt (Ozella - OZ 048 CD), with Camilla Granlien
- 2015: Short Stories (Ozella - OZ 059 CD)
- 2018: Dirr (Hubro Music)
- 2022: Linde (Hubro Music)

With Synnøve S. Bjørset og Åse Teigland

- 2010: Soli (ta:lik - TA83CD)

With Øyonn Groven Myhren

- 2017: Sogesong (Heilo - HCD7319)
- 2018: Nordjordet (Jazzland Recordings – 377 908 5)
