= Kristin Sevaldsen =

Norwegian jazz saxophonist and composer

- Born: 10 January 1966 (age 59); Lillehammer, Oppland
- Origin: Norway
- Genres: Jazz
- Occupations: Musician, composer, music producer
- Instrument: Saxophone
- Website: www.kristinsevaldsen.com

Kristin Sevaldsen (born 10 January 1966 in Lillehammer, Norway) is a Norwegian Jazz musician (saxophone), composer, and music producer.

== Career ==
Sevaldsen has been a band member and session musician for several years. In 2007, she released the debut solo album, Impressions. The album gained very favorable reviews, and the Kristin Sevaldsen Band played at several concert venues both in Norway and internationally.

In 2009 she released the psalm album Treasure, together with Lewi Bergrud and Dag Stokke. The record company Naxos was awarded hymn album in 2009, and it received good reviews from both the album and live concerts. The next solo album Transit was completed in 2011. The musicians of the set is Tom Erik Antonsen, Per Hillestad and Einar Thorbjørnsen.

The album Aftenstemning (2011) was released in collaboration with Norwegian folk musician Camilla Granlien. They have put new melodies and arrangements for poems by Bjørnson. Musicians are Morten Reppesgård, Jo F. Skaansar and Harald Skullerud. Besides her own music she contributes in multiple projects with the likes of Gaute Ormåsen and Cecilia Vennersten.

Otherwise she is doing studio sessions for other artists and creates music for film and theater. In 2012, she began postgraduate studies in film music composition at Lillehammer University College, and has already made her mark in the field.

== Honors ==
- 2013: Oppland county's Work grant for established artists

== Discography ==
=== Solo albums ===
- 2007: Impressions (D'Label)
- 2009: Treasure (D'Label), with Lewi Bergrud and Dag Stokke, including old Scandinavian psalms and hymns
- 2011: Transit (d'Label Records), within The Millionairs

=== Collaborations ===
- 2011: Aftenstemning (Ta:lik), with Norwegian traditional folk musician Camilla Granlien, including original written tunes and arrangements to poems by Bjørnstjerne Bjørnson
