= Øyonn Groven Myhren =

Norwegian musician

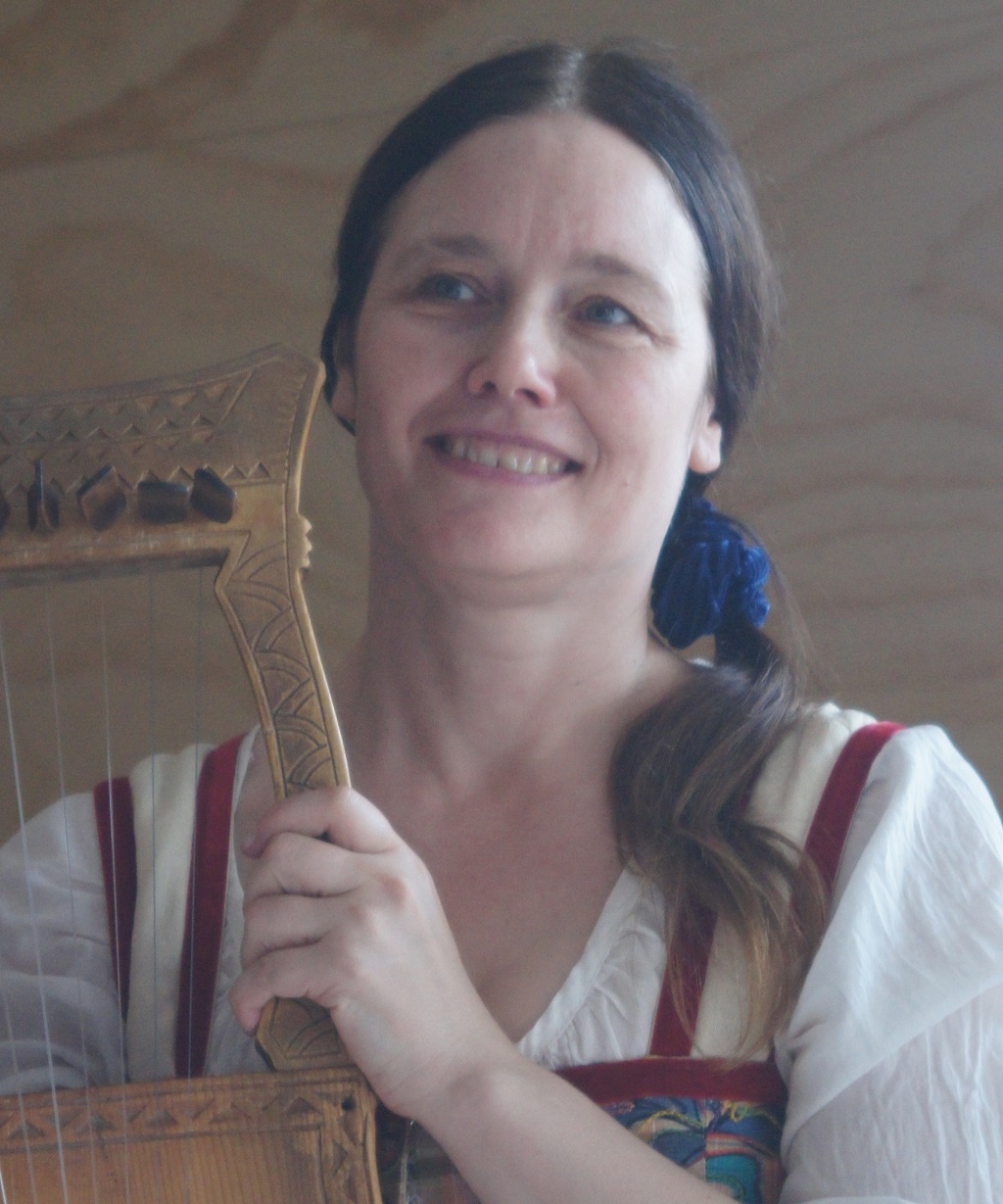
- Øyonn Groven Myhren (2019)

Background information
- Born: 8 August 1969 (age 56)
- Origin: Oslo, Norway
- Genres: Traditional folk music, Medieval music
- Instrument(s): Vocals, flute and lyre
- Years active: 1995–present
- Labels: Heilo, Grappa

Øyonn Groven Myhren (born 8 August 1969) is a Norwegian traditional folk musician and kveder.

== Biography ==
Groven Myhren was born in Oslo, Norway, where she is considered among the foremost traditional folk musicians, and has a series of first prizes from the traditional Norwegian music competition Landskappleiken. In 1997 she was awarded the Sagaprisen for her kveding. She also plays the lyre and seljefløyte (willow flute). In addition to Norwegian folk music, she has worked extensively with mediaeval music, including through the band Aurora Borealis. She released the album «Nivelkinn» (2001) in collaboration with Odd Nordstoga, and with lyrics by Aslaug Vaa, awarded Spellemannprisen 2002 in the Traditional folk music/gammaldans (folk dance) class. Groven Myhren has also worked as an actor at Det Norske Teatret, Riksteatret and Hordaland Theatre.

Groven Myhren is the daughter of the kveder and literature researcher Dagne Groven Myhren and the Spellemann and linguist Magne Myhren. She is the granddaughter of Eivind Groven.

== Discography ==
=== Solo albums ===
- 2003: Akkedoria frå Kristiania (Etnisk Musikklubb)
- 2008: Grisila og Gullveven (Etnisk Musikklubb)

=== Collaborations ===
With Dvergmål

- 1996: Visor og Kvæde frå Blåberglandet (Grappa GRCD 2141)
- 2004: Song i Himmelsalar (Heilo HCD 7192)

With Aurora Borealis

- 1997: Harpa (Grappa GRCD4132) 1997

With Eilert Hægeland and Alf Tveit

- 1998: I Jolo (Jul På Gamlemåten) (Heilo HCD 7146)

With Odd Nordstoga

- 2002: Nivelkinn (Heilo HCD 7182)

With Kvarts, Berit Opheim, and Birger Mistereggen

- 2004: Skal, Skal Ikkje (Kvarts KVARTS 003)

With Lars Henrik Johansen

- 2015: Paa Jorden Fred Og Glæde - (Beloved Christmas Hymns Of 18th-Century Norway) (Etnisk Musikklubb)

With Anne Hytta

- 2017: Sogesong (Heilo HCD 7319)

Awards
Preceded by Per Sæmund Bjørkum	Recipient of the Traditional folk music Spellemannprisen; 2002	Succeeded by Majorstuen
