= Kjersti Engan =

Norwegian researcher

- Born: 1971 (age 54–55); Bergen, Norway
- Education: Bergen University College; University of Stavanger
- Occupation: Engineering researcher

Kjersti Engan (born 1971) is a Norwegian researcher in signal and image processing who works as a professor of electrical engineering and computer science at the University of Stavanger.

Engan was born in 1971 in Bergen. She earned a bachelor's degree in electrical engineering in 1994 from Bergen University College. She then moved to the University of Stavanger for graduate study, completing her doctorate in 2000. At Stavanger, she was promoted to full professor in 2008.

Engan is a member of the Norwegian Academy of Technological Sciences.
