= Ellen Fjestad =

Ellen Fjestad (born 1979) is a Norwegian writer of young adult fiction.

Hailing from Stange Municipality, she tried her hand at several vocations, taking educations in both nursing, gardening and children's writing. In 2011 she won a 200,000 kr stipend from Schibsted to complete her debut novel, based on her initial drafts submitted to Schibsted's competition. The book was published in 2012 under the title Sammen skal vi holde himmelen, and earned her the Uprisen award.

Fjestad followed with Døgnfluedans (Schibsted, 2015) and Den som vokter lyset (Vigmostad & Bjørke, 2019).

Awards
Preceded by Terje Torkildsen	Recipient of the Uprisen; 2013; With: Marianne Kaurin	Succeeded by Thomas Enger
