= Liv Lønnum =

Norwegian politician

Liv Lønnum (born 1974) is a Norwegian politician for the Progress Party.

During her early career she worked for Aftenposten, the PR firm Madland & Wara, Storebrand from 2011 to 2017 and then the consulting firm Hammer & Hanborg from 2017. She was a local politician when living in Nordstrand, where she represented the Progress Party in the borough council. She was formerly married to Progress Party politician Arve Lønnum Jr. and had three children.

In January 2019, Normann was appointed State Secretary for Kjell-Børge Freiberg in the Ministry of Petroleum and Energy. She served until the Progress Party exited Solberg's Cabinet in January 2020.
