= University of Stavanger =

University in Stavanger, Norway

- Universitetet i Stavanger (UiS)
- Motto: Utfordre det velkjente, utforske det ukjente
- Motto in English: Challenge the known, explore the unknown
- Type: Public research university
- Established: January 1, 2005; 21 years ago (1969; 57 years ago)
- Affiliations: EUA; ECIU
- Budget: NOK 1.981 bn ($190 mm) (2024)
- Chairperson: Anne Marit Panengstuen
- Rector: Klaus Mohn
- Total staff: 2,359 (2026)
- Students: 13,647 (2025)
- Location: Stavanger, Norway; 58°56′15″N 5°41′51″E
- Campus: Rural and urban
- Website: uis.no

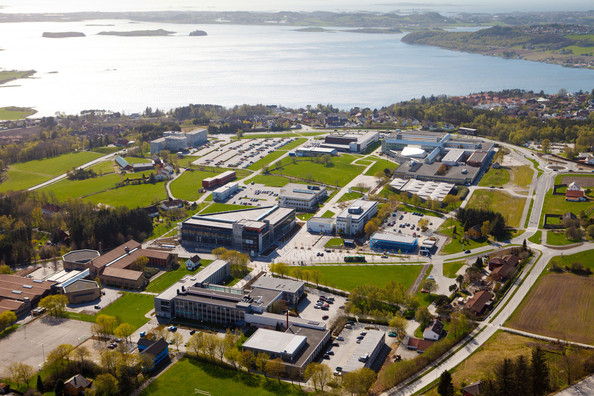
Ullandhaug campus. University of Stavanger

The University of Stavanger (Norwegian: Universitetet i Stavanger, UiS) is a public research university located in Stavanger, Norway. It was established in 2005 when the Stavanger University College received university status.

The university is organised in six faculties. In 2025 it had 13,647 students and 2,369 employees including academics, administrative and service staff. In 2024 it had a budget of just under two billion NOK, which corresponds to roughly $190 million.

== History ==
The university has its roots in Rogaland Regional College, established in 1969. In 1986, Rogaland Regional College merged with the Rogaland Polytechnic to form Rogaland College Center.

In 1994, the Stavanger University College (Norwegian: Høgskolen i Stavanger; HiS) was formed, when Rogaland College Center merged with Stavanger Nursing College, Stavanger Social Work College, the Norwegian Hospitality College, Stavanger Teachers' College, Rogaland Music Conservatory and the Congregational College.

In January 2005, the college was granted university status by the government. Officially rebranding as the University of Stavanger. It was the first university to form as the result of a merger.

In 2009, the Museum of Archaeology in Stavanger was transferred from Stavanger Museum to UiS.

The University of Stavanger was in 2018 the third highest ranked in Norway in terms of number of research publications per member of scientific staff and fifth overall. The university became a member of the European Consortium of Innovative Universities (ECIU) in October 2012.

== Organisation and administration ==
The university board consists of the leader, 3 representatives chosen by the scientific staff, 3 from representatives from outside the university, 2 chosen by the student parliament, 1 representative chosen by temporary staff, and 1 representative chosen by technical and administrative staff. The rector is secretary of the board.

It is organised in six faculties: Arts and Education, Social Sciences, Science and Technology, Performing Arts, Health Sciences and the UiS School of Business and Law. There are also two national centres of expertise and the Museum of Archaeology. The university has two campuses: one at Ullandhaug and another at Bjergsted; both in Stavanger. The latter campus hosts the Faculty of Performing Arts.

=== Faculty of Arts and Education ===
- Department of Education and Sports Science
- Department of Early Childhood Education
  - Filiorum Center: High Quality in Early Childhood Education and Care
- Department of Cultural Studies and Languages

=== Faculty of Social Sciences ===
- Department of Media and Social Sciences
- Department of Social Studies
- The Norwegian School of Hotel Management

=== Faculty of Science and Technology ===
- Department of Electrical Engineering and Computer Science
  - Stavanger AI lab
- Department of Mathematics and Physics
  - Quark-Lab: Centre for fundamental physics research (SFF)
- Department of Mechanical and Structural Engineering and Materials Science
- Department of Safety, Economics and Planning
- Department of Chemistry, Biosciences and Environmental engineering
- Department of Energy Resources
- Department of Energy and Petroleum Engineering

=== Faculty of Health Sciences ===
- Department of Public Health
- Department of Quality and Health Technology
- Department of Caring and Ethics

=== Faculty of Performing Arts ===
- Department of Classical Music
- Department of Jazz, Dance, PPU (Educational Theory and Practice), and Music Production

=== UiS School of Business and Law ===
- Department of Innovation, Management and Marketing
  - Centre for Innovation Research
- Department of Economics and Finance
- Department of Accounting and Law

== International collaboration ==
The university is an active member of the University of the Arctic. UArctic is an international cooperative network based in the Circumpolar Arctic region, consisting of more than 200 universities, colleges, and other organizations with an interest in promoting education and research in the Arctic region.

University rankings

Global – Overall
- QS World: 851-900 (2026)

== Notable people ==
=== Faculty ===
- Jan Egeland, diplomat, political scientist and humanitarian leader
- Kjersti Engan, scientist
- Hande Eslen-Ziya, sociologist
- Wencke Mühleisen, gender and media researcher
- Ellen Nisbeth, violist

=== Alumni ===
- Bodil Arnesen, opera singer
- Geir Bergkastet, director
- Helge Eide, oil & gas executive
- Ingrid Fiskaa, politician
- Leif Johan Sevland, politician
- Hadia Tajik, politician
