= Marianne Kaurin =

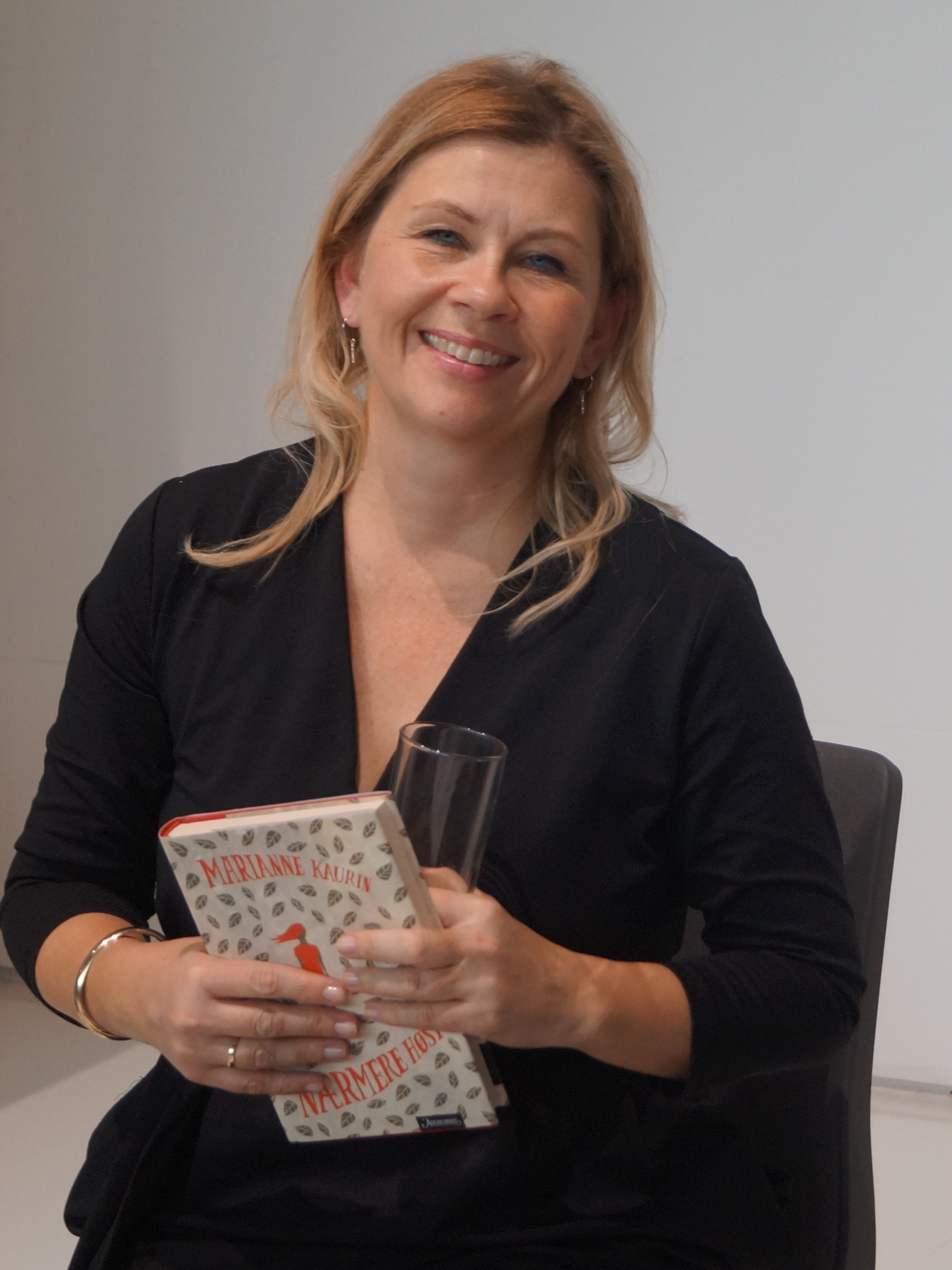
Marianne Kaurin in 2019

Marianne Kaurin (born 18 May 1974) is a Norwegian writer of young adult fiction.

Her debut novel was Nærmere høst (2012). The book was about the holocaust in Norway from the perspective of a 15-year-old girl, and earned her a Sydney Taylor Book Award honorable mention and the Uprisen. She followed with Deres majestet (2016), Syden (2018)—which won the Deutscher Jugendliteraturpreis—and Trivselslederen (2023).

Outside of writing, she is an editor in the publishing house Cappelen Damm. Her books, however, have all been published by Aschehoug.

She hails from Tønsberg, but resides at Nesodden.

Awards
Preceded by Terje Torkildsen	Recipient of the Uprisen; 2013 (shared with Ellen Fjestad)	Succeeded by Thomas Enger
Preceded by Will Gmehling	Recipient of the Deutscher Jugendliteraturpreis; 2021)	Succeeded by Ali Benjamin
