= Dagne Groven Myhren =

Norwegian literary scholar (1940–2024)

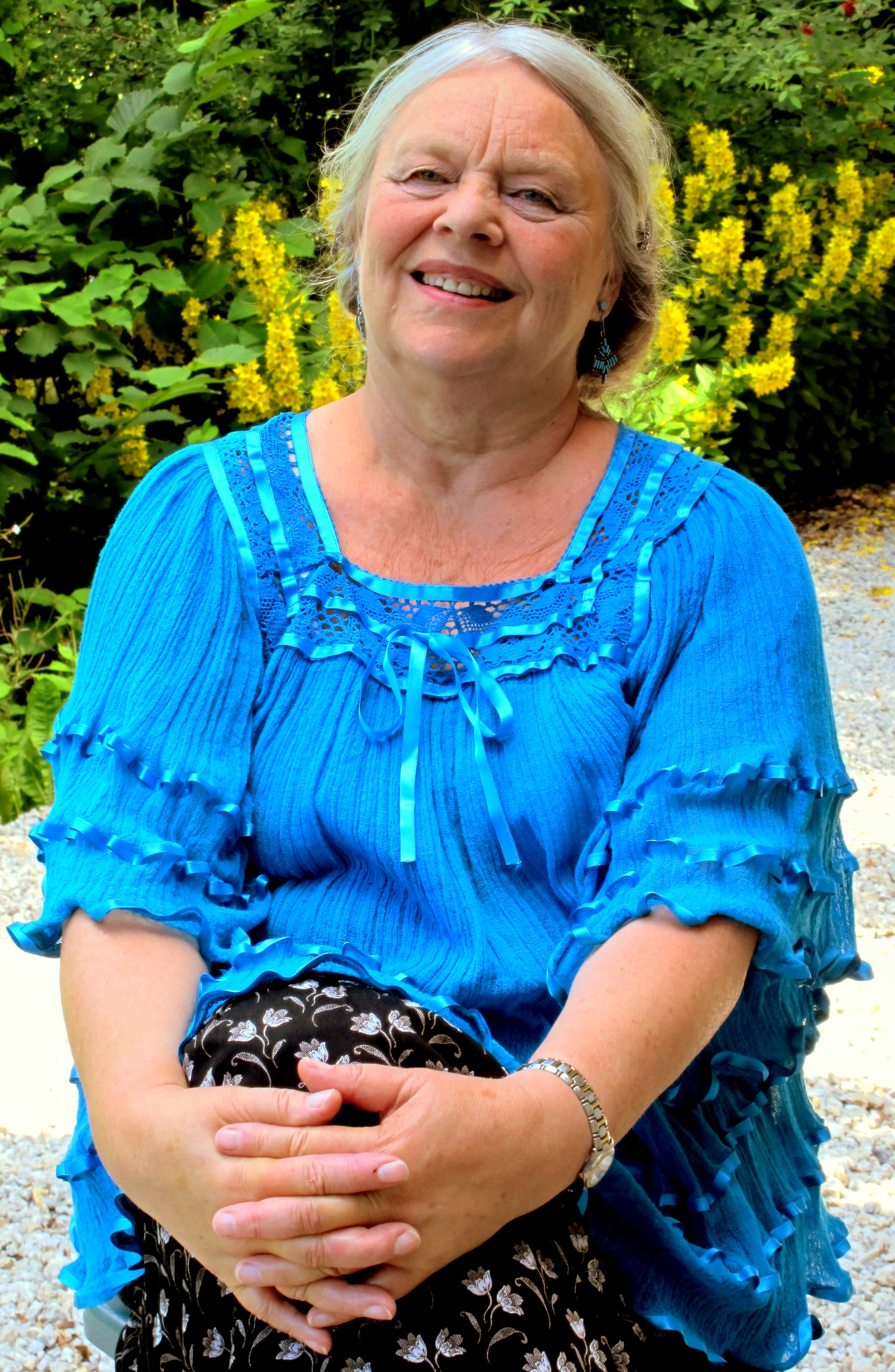
Myhren in 2010

Dagne Groven Myhren (19 September 1940 – 29 April 2024) was a Norwegian literature researcher, folk musician and educator. Her literary studies have included significant works on Henrik Wergeland (earning her a PhD) and on Norwegian folk poetry. As a singer, she focused on the traditional songs of Telemark, frequently contributing to radio programmes. Until her retirement in 2003, she was professor of Nordic Studies at the University of Oslo. Myhren died on 29 April 2024, at the age of 83.

== Early life, family and education ==
Born on 19 September 1940 in Oslo, Dagne Groven was the daughter of the composer Eivind Olavsson Groven (1901–77) and his wife Ragna Charlotte Joselin née Hagen (1902–60). The third of the family's four children, her elder sister Tone Groven Holmboe was a composer. She was married to the violinist Magne Myhren (1937–2015) with whom she had two children, the folk musician Øyonn Groven Myhren (born 1969) and the philologist Eilev Groven Myhren (born 1973). In addition to folklore, music and Nordic studies, in 1988 she earned a PhD for her thesis on Henrik Wergeland's poetical work: Creation, Man and the Messiah.

== Career ==
Myrhen began lecturing in Nordic literature at the University of Oslo in 1972, becoming a full professor in 1998. She retired from the university in 2003.

Her literary research centred on Wergeland's poem Creation, Man and the Messiah, culminating in her thesis Kjærlighet og logos which was published as a book in 1991. She conducted research on the authors Hans E. Kinck and Tarjei Vesaas and undertook an analysis of Henrik Ibsen's Peer Gynt. She developed her interest in folklore in collaboration with her maternal aunt Ingeborg Refling Hagen and participated in her Stutting Movement.

Encouraged by her father Eivind Groven and by the folk musicians Talleiv Røysland and Aslak Brekke, Myrhen has developed a special interest in the vocal traditions of Telemark. As a singer, she has been complimented on her stylistic range and the sensitivity of her songs. Since 1964, she has made recordings and has presented folk music radio programmes on NRK. Her compositions include music for the verses of poets including Wergeland, Riefling and Bjørnstjerne Bjørnson.
