= Silvia K. Kosmo =

Norwegian politician (born 1977)

Silvia Kristoffersen Kosmo (born 30 March 1977) is a Norwegian politician for the Labour Party.

She served in the position of deputy representative to the Norwegian Parliament from Vestfold in the term 2005–2009, meeting as a regular representative from December 2006 after Dag Terje Andersen was appointed to the Cabinet.
