= Siv Juvik Tveitnes =

Norwegian media executive

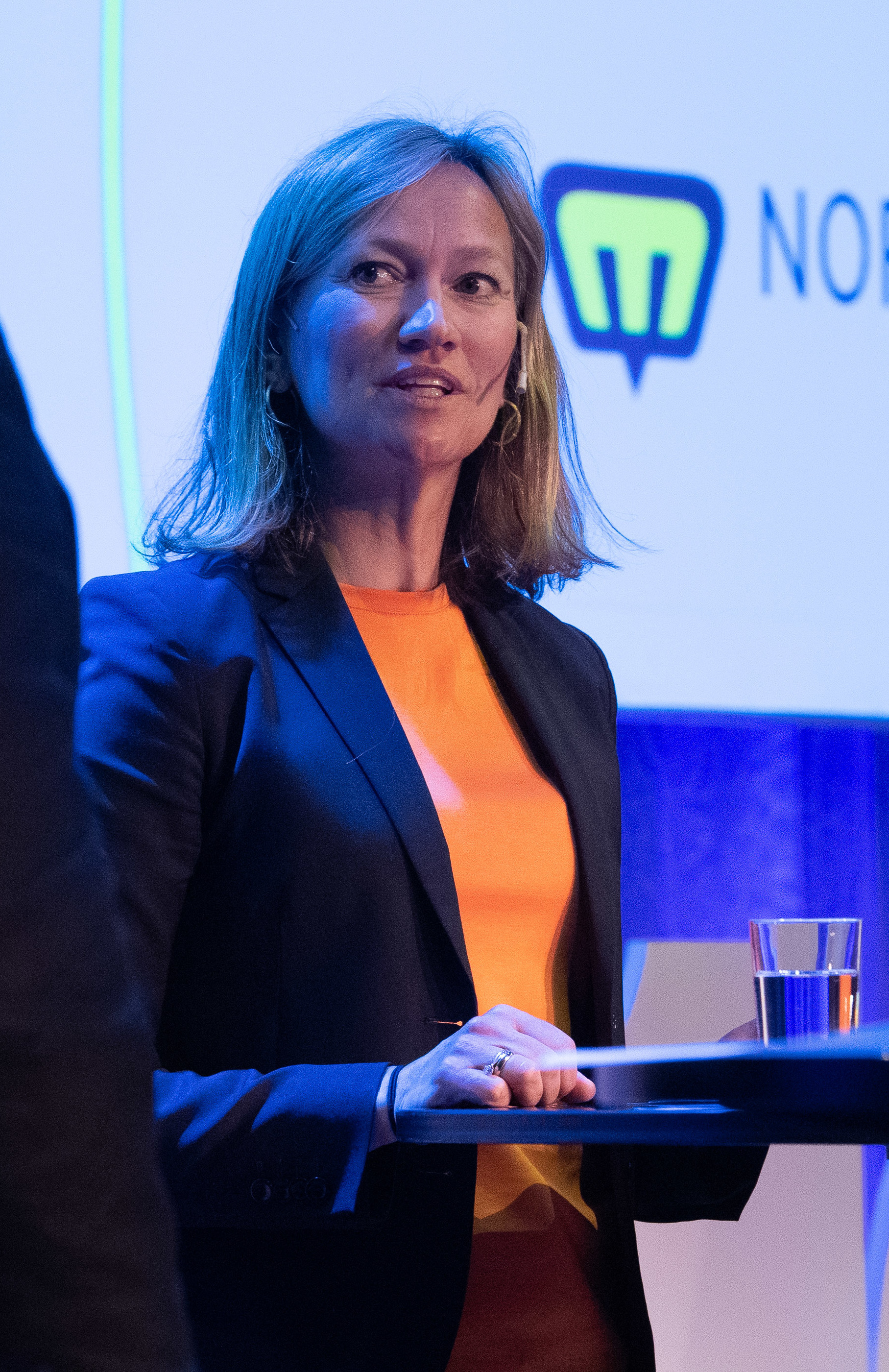
- Born: 13 March 1974 (age 52); Askøy Municipality, Norway
- Education: University of Bergen; University of Bath
- Occupation: Media executive
- Employer: Schibsted
- Children: Albert Juvik Tveitnes, Johannes Juvik Tveitnes

Siv Juvik Tveitnes (born 13 March 1974) is a Norwegian media executive. From 2019 to 2024 she was chief executive officer of Schibsted News Media. After a restructuring of Schibsted in 2024 she is CEO of Schibsted Media.

== Personal life and education ==
Born in Askøy Municipality on 13 March 1974, Tveitnes studied media and graduated with a cand.mag. from the University of Bergen. She also has a master's degree in economy and administration from the University of Bath.

== Career ==
Tveitnes has worked in the media business since 2006. From 2014 to 2015 she was managing director of both Bergens Tidende and Stavanger Aftenblad. From 2015 to 2019 she was director in the Schibsted media division, and from 2019 to 2024 she was chief executive officer of Schibsted News Media. As CEO for Scibsted News Media, she was responsible for the newspapers Verdens Gang, Aftenposten, Aftonbladet, and Svenska Dagbladet.

In February 2024 she was announced CEO of the new company Schibsted Media, to be split out from Schibsted as a separate company.

From 2021 to 2023 she chaired the board of the Norwegian Press Association.
