= Siv Elin Hansen =

Norwegian politician

Siv Elin Hansen (born 10 August 1974) is a Norwegian politician for the Socialist Left Party.

Hansen served as a deputy representative to the Parliament of Norway from Troms during the term 2013–2017. She has been a member of the municipal council of Nordreisa Municipality.
