= Helge Eide (businessman) =

Norwegian businessman

- Born: 1 April 1954 (age 72)
- Education: Rogaland University College
- Occupation: businessman

Helge Eide (born 1 April 1954) is a Norwegian businessman.

He graduated from Rogaland University College (now named University of Stavanger) with a bachelor's degree in petroleum engineering.

He became managing director in DNO ASA in 2000, having first joined that company in 1996. He previously held management positions in Smedvig Group, Norsk Hydro, Read Petroleum Energy and Elf.
