= Reidar Eriksen =

Norwegian trade unionist and politician

Reidar Eriksen (1894–1977) was a Norwegian trade unionist and politician for the Communist Party.

He was a plumber in his working career, and joined the trade union Rørleggernes fagforening in 1923. He was also a board member of the Union of Iron and Metalworkers locally, and the Union of Building Workers nationwide. He joined the Communist Party, where he became deputy leader in 1924 and was the regional leader in Oslo and Akershus from 1925 to 1926. He stood for election in Akershus in 1924, as the first candidate on the ballot, and in the same year he was a delegate at the Fifth Comintern Congress as well as at the Red International of Labour Unions Congress. In 1925 he became a member of the politburo of the Communist Party.
