= Trond Lode =

Norwegian politician (born 1974)

Trond Lode (born 19 November 1974) is a Norwegian politician for the Centre Party.

He served in the position of deputy representative to the Norwegian Parliament from Rogaland since the 2005 election, but halfway through term he moved up to serve as a regular representative, replacing Magnhild Meltveit Kleppa who was appointed to the Cabinet in September 2007.
