= Sheila Barth Stanford =

Norwegian chess player (born 1974)

Personal information
- Born: 13 July 1974 (age 51)

Chess career
- Country: Norway
- Title: Woman International Master (2004)
- Peak rating: 2243 (November 2012)

Sheila Barth Stanford (née Sheila Barth Berntsen; born 13 July 1974) is a Norwegian chess player and coach. She holds the title Woman International Master, and has competed for Norway in the Women's Chess Olympiad multiple times.

== Biography ==
Born on 13 July 1974, Sheila Barth Stanford achieved the title Woman FIDE Master in 1995, and was awarded the Woman International Master title in 2004.

She has represented Norway in twelve Women's Chess Olympiads, including 1990, 1992, 1996 2000, 2004, 2006, 2008, 2010, 2012 and 2014. She became Nordic champion for women in 2019.

Since 2014 she has worked as speaker and chess coach, and has taken part in recruitment work. She was awarded the Norwegian Chess Federation's honorary medal in gold in 2014.
