= Pernille Holmboe =

Norwegian model

- Born: 2 May 1977 (age 49); Bærum, Norway
- Modeling information
- Height: 1.78 m (5 ft 10 in)/5 ft 10.5 in (1.79 m)
- Hair color: Dark blonde
- Eye color: Green
- Website: http://supermodels.nl/pernilleholmboe

Pernille Holmboe (born 2 May 1977 in Bærum, Norway) is a Norwegian model widely known as the face of the Swedish clothing company Gina Tricot, with whom she had a long-running contract, that was terminated in 2010. She is especially known for this among Norwegians, to whom she has become "synonymous" with the brand.

She has been modeling since her teens, first in Milan and Paris, and then New York City, before moving to London and later Hong Kong.

After six years as the face for Gina Tricot, in 2010 she resigned and was replaced by the Brazilian model Emanuela de Paula. One of the reasons for the change was because she got pregnant according to Victor Appelqvist, marketing director at Gina Tricot. In 2011 she started her own fashion brand, Chicameo, together with Norwegian fashion designer Tale Hagelsteen. Holmboe currently resides in Hong Kong.
