= Mari Rege =

Norwegian economist

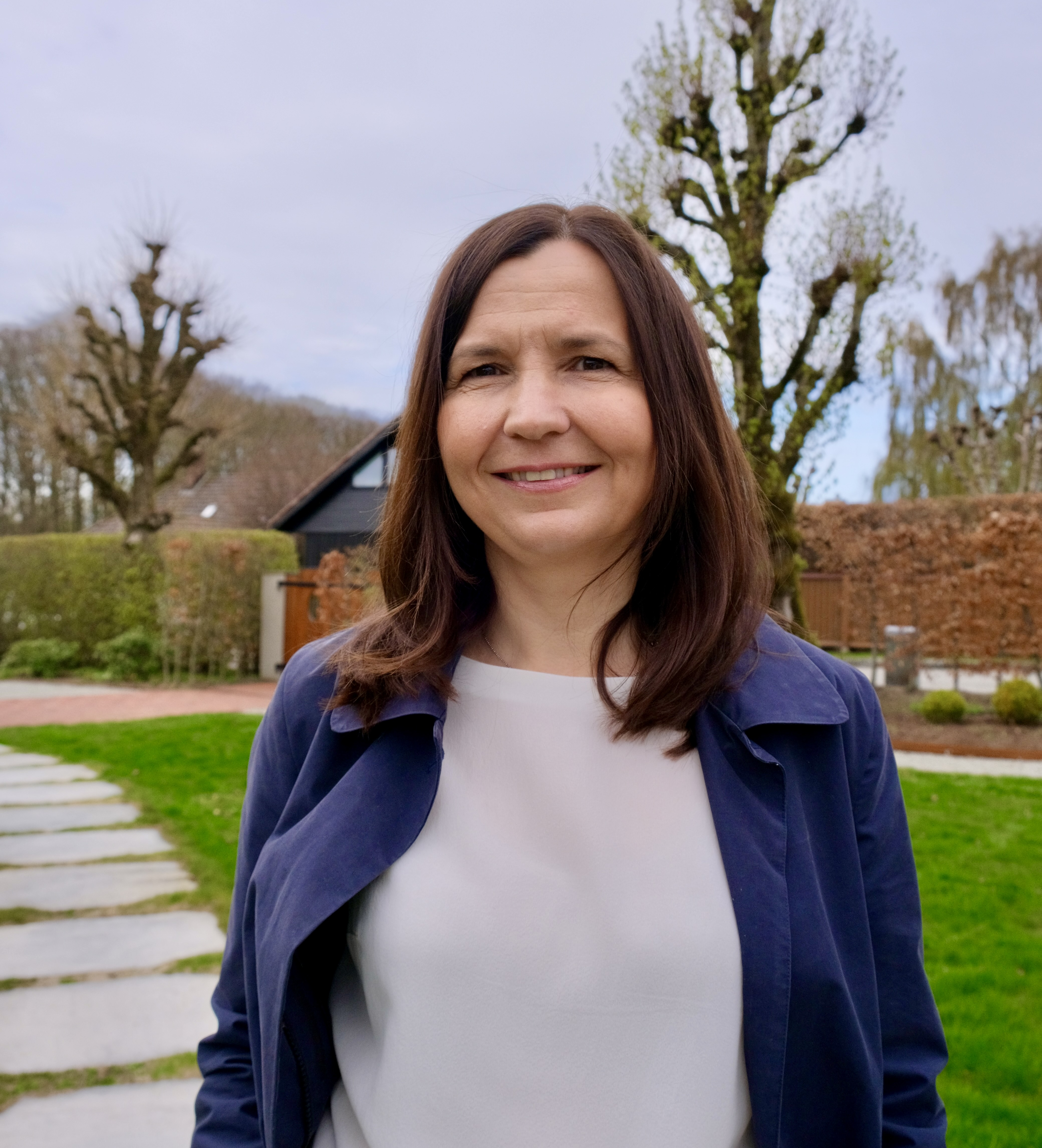
- Professor Mari Rege
- Born: 19 June 1974; Skedsmo, Norway

Academic background
- Education: University of Oslo
- Influences: John Maynard Keynes; Ragnar Frisch; Jan Tinbergen

Academic work
- Discipline: Macroeconomics, econometrics
- School or tradition: Neo-Keynesian economics
- Institutions: University of Stavanger; Case Western Reserve University; University of Oslo
- Awards: Stavanger Forum formidlingspris (2010)
- Website: Information at IDEAS / RePEc

Mari Rege (born 1974) is a Norwegian economist and professor of economics at the University of Stavanger. Appointed there in 2009, she is the youngest such professor to be appointed in Norway. She specializes in family, gender equality, working life, and school performance issues.

Rege received a cand.polit. degree in economics from the University of Oslo in 1998 and a dr.polit. degree in 2002. She was an assistant professor at Case Western Reserve University from 2002 to 2006 and an associate professor at the University of Stavanger in 2006, where she became a full professor in 2009. She was one of twenty young researchers awarded a four-year scholarship for Outstanding Young Investigators by the Research Council of Norway in 2007.

From 2008 to 2009, she was a member of the Commission of Income Distribution in Norway. Currently, she is a member of a committee appointed by the Norwegian government, The Norwegian Committee on Skill Needs (Kompetansebehovsutvalget), which is meant to provide the best possible evidence-based assessment of Norway’s future skill needs. She was a member of the Norway towards 2025 committee, whose job it was to evaluate opportunities for value creation, production and employment after the Corona pandemics. She was also part of the Ludvigsenutvalget and Fordelingsutvalget committees.

She is a frequent commentator in her fields of expertise in Norwegian media, and is an op-ed columnist for Aftenposten and other newspapers, such as Dagens Næringsliv. In August 2010, she was awarded the 2009 "Stavanger Forum formidlingspris" award for research dissemination.

Rege is currently the co-founder and co-director of Synapse Lab, which is a cross-disciplinary lab at the UiS. This lab conducts large scale experiments which aims to investigate and develop interventions for promoting motivation and learning in education and work life.

== Selected publications ==
- Rege, M, K. Telle and M. Votruba, 2011, "Parental Job Loss and Children’s School Performance", The Review of Economic Studies, forthcoming.
- Cooper, D. and M. Rege, 2011, "Social Interaction Effects and Choice Under Uncertainty: An Experimental Study", Games and Economic Behavior, forthcoming.
- Kalil, A., M. Mogstad, M. Rege and M. Votruba, 2011, "Divorced Fathers’ Proximity and Children's Long Run Outcomes: Evidence from Norwegian Registry Data", Demography, forthcoming.
- Mogstad, M. and M. Rege, 2009, "Betydningen av tidlig læring for å motvirke at fattigdom går i arv", Barnefattigdom, T. Fløtten (ed), Gyldendal forlag, 2009.
- Rege, M., K. Telle and M. Votruba, 2009, "The Effect of Plant Downsizing on Disability Pension Utilization", Journal of the European Economic Association, 7(4), p. 754-785.
- Rebitzer, J.B, M. Rege and C. Shepard, 2008, "Influence, information Overload and Information Technology in Health Care", Advances in Health Economics and Health Services Research, 19, p. 43-69.
- Rege, M., 2008, "Why do People Care about Social Status?", Journal of Economic Behavior and Organization, 66(2), 233-242
- Brekke K.A, K. Nyborg and M. Rege, 2007, "The Fear of Exclusion: Individual Effort when Group Formation is Endogenous", Scandinavian Journal of Economics, 109 (3), p. 531-550.
- Brekke K.A. and M. Rege, 2007, "Advertising as Distortion of Social Learning", The B.E. Journal of Theoretical Economics: Topic in Theoretical Economics, 7(1).
- Rege, M. and K. Telle, 2006, "Unaffected Strangers Affect Contributions", Nordic Journal of Political Economy, 32(2).
- Rege, M. and K. Telle, 2004, "The Impact of Social Approval and Framing on Cooperation in Public Good Situations", Journal of Public Economics, 88 (7-8), p. 1625-1644.
- Rege, M., 2004, "Social Norms and Private Provision of Public Goods", Journal of Public Economic Theory, 6 (1), p. 65-77
- Nyborg, K. and M. Rege, 2003, "On Social Norms: The Evolution of Considerate Smoking Behavior", Journal of Economic Behavior and Organization, 52 (3), p. 323-340.
- Nyborg, K. and M. Rege, 2003, "Does Public Policy Crowd Out Private Contributions to Public Goods?", Public Choice, 115(3), p. 397-418.
- Rege, M., 2000, "Strategic Policy and Environmental Quality: Helping the Domestic Industry to Provide Credible Information", Environmental and Resource Economics, 14(3), 279–296.
