= Einar Høiland =

Norwegian meteorologist

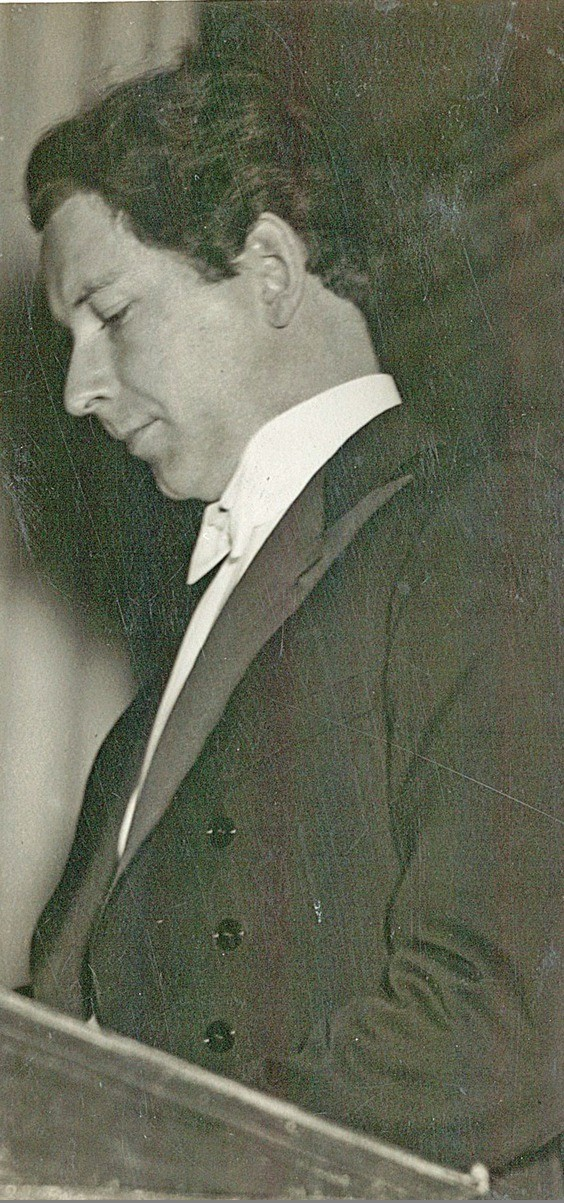
Einar Høiland

Einar Høiland (1907–1974) was a Norwegian meteorologist.

Høiland was born in Farsund. He received his PhD in 1939. In 1947, he was a lecturer in aerodynamics and hydrodynamics at the University of Oslo, and from 1954, he was a professor at the university. In 1951 he established the Institute for Weather and Climate Research of the Norwegian Academy of Science and Letters, that he led until 1960. There he built a scientific environment that fostered meteorological research in Norway. Høiland's primary interest was on the connection between hydrodynamics and thermodynamics, the stability of fluids, and the theory of lee waves.

The Solberg-Høiland criteria for the stability of rotating thermally stratified flows are named after him and Halvor Solberg. The criterion is universal and applicable to any fluid under these conditions, be it Earth's atmosphere, the interiors of stars, or astrophysical disks. A first criterion was obtained by Solberg, in 1936, for the case of axisymmetric disturbances in an atmosphere with constant entropy. The result was generalized by Høiland in his Ph.D. thesis, and published in 1941.
