= Thea Selliaas Thorsen =

Norwegian classicist and translator

Thea S. Thorsen
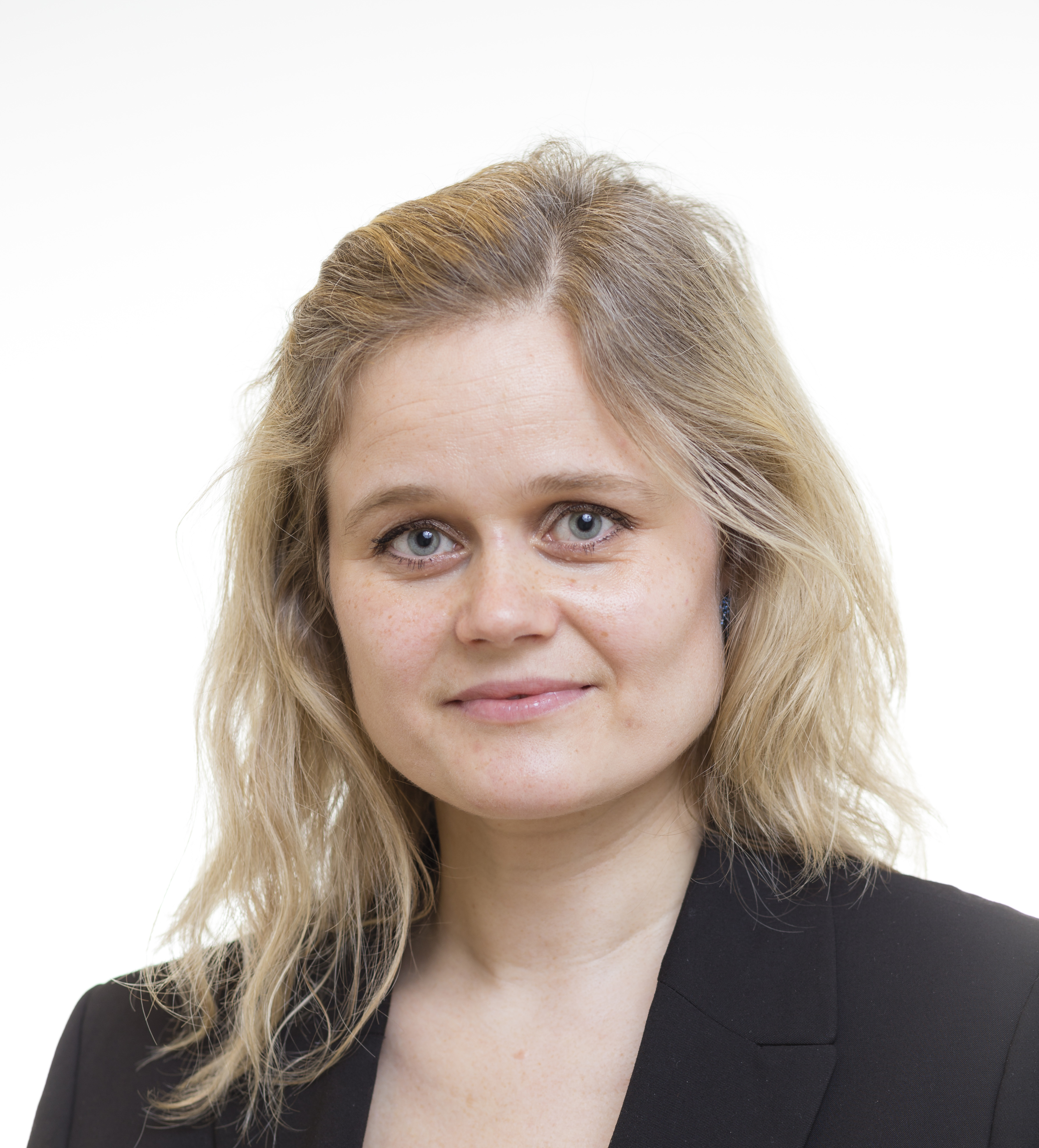
- Occupations: Classicist, translator

Academic background
- Education: University of Bergen

Academic work
- Discipline: Classicist
- Sub-discipline: Greek and Latin literature
- Institutions: Norwegian University of Science and Technology

For the cyclist, seeThea Thorsen

Thea Selliaas Thorsen (born 28 May 1974) is a Norwegian classicist and professor of Classical Studies at the Norwegian University of Technology and Science (NTNU) in Trondheim. She is a recognised expert on Latin love elegy and on Ovid.

== Biography ==
Thorsen received her PhD in Latin from the University of Bergen in 2007, with a thesis entitled "Scribentis imagines in Ovidian authorship and scholarship". The thesis was a study of the authenticity of Heroides 15 (the Epistula Sapphus). She had earlier completed her Master᾽s thesis in Latin at the University of Oslo.

She has been employed by the Norwegian University of Science and Technology since 2009, first as a postdoctoral fellow funded by the Research Council of Norway (with a project entitled "The heterosexual tradition of homoerotic poets"), as an associate professor from 2014–2019 and as a full professor from 2019. She was the first Scandinavian editor of a volume on a classical topic in the Cambridge Companions series, with her edited volume The Cambridge Companion to Latin Love Elegy.

Thorsen was selected for the Young Academy of Europe in 2019. She is the academic project leader for Kanon, Gyldendal᾽s series for Norwegian translations of previously untranslated works from Greek and Roman antiquity. She published the first translations of Ovid᾽s love elegies into Norwegian, with scholarly introductions and notes, in elegiac couplets. In 2024, she published the first full translation of Ovid᾽s Metamorphoses into Norwegian. She has also published a novel, Pia Fraus (2004).

She is one of two editors (along with Laurel Fulkerson) of Ovidius, the journal of The International Ovidian Society (from 2024–2026).

== Selected publications ==
Monographs in English

- Ovid᾽s Early Poetry (Cambridge University Press, 2014)

Edited volumes

- Co-editor (with Antony Augoustakis and Stavros Frangolidis), Classical Enrichment: Greek and Latin Literature and its Reception (De Gruyter, 2025) ISBN 978-311157684-8
- Co-editor (with Dr. Iris Brecke and Prof. Stephen Harrison), Greek and Latin Love: The Poetic Connection (Walter de Gruyter, 2021)
- Co-editor (with Prof. Stephen Harrison), Roman Receptions of Sappho (Oxford University Press, 2019)
- Co-editor (with Prof. Stephen Harrison), Dynamics of Ancient Prose (De Gruyter, 2018)
- Editor, The Cambridge Companion to Latin Love Elegy (Cambridge University Press, 2013)
- Editor, Greek and Roman Games in the Computer Age (Akademika, 2012)

Doctoral dissertation

- Scribentis imagines in Ovidian authorship and scholarship (University of Bergen, 2007).

Publications in Norwegian

- Co-author (with Vibeke Roggen, Siri Sande and Per-Bjarne Ravnå) Antikkens kultur (Aschehoug, 2010) ISBN 978-82-03-33743-7
- Kom ikke uten begjær, essays (Gyldendal Norsk Forlag, 2012) ISBN 978-82-05-40961-3

Translations into Norwegian

- Heroides – Heltinnebrev (Gyldendal Norsk Forlag, 2001) ISBN 82-05-29132-2
- Amores – Kjærlighetseventyr (Gyldendal Norsk Forlag, 2002) ISBN 82-05-30783-0
- Ars Amandi – Kunsten å elske (Gyldendal Norsk Forlag, 2006) ISBN 978-82-05-35358-9
- Kjærlighetskuren og Brevvekslinger (Gyldendal Norsk Forlag, 2009) ISBN 978-82-05-38775-1
- Metamorfoser (Gyldendal Norsk Forlag, 2024) ISBN 9788205587762
