= Kirsten Ohm =

Norwegian diplomat

Kirsten Ohm (27 September 1930 – 20 July 1999) was a Norwegian diplomat. She was Norway's first female ambassador.

She was born in Narvik, and graduated with the mag.art. degree in political science in 1956. Being the first woman to do so, she subsequently became the second woman to enrol in the Norwegian Ministry of Foreign Affairs training programme in 1959. She was appointed to the foreign service in the Ministry of Foreign Affairs in 1960, again as the first woman. In her early career she served as embassy secretary in Paris from 1961, being transferred to the Norwegian United Nations delegation in 1964. She returned to Norway for the time being in 1967.

After serving as assistant secretary in the Ministry of Foreign Affairs from 1971, she became embassy councillor in Paris in 1972 and permanent representative to the European Council in 1975. From 1981 she was a special adviser in the Ministry of Foreign Affairs, and from 1987 to 1992 Norway's ambassador to the Republic of Ireland.
