= Iren Opdahl =

Norwegian politician

Iren Opdahl (born 19 October 1974) is a Norwegian politician for the Liberal Party.

She served as a deputy representative to the Parliament of Norway from Nord-Trøndelag during the term 2013–2017. She hails from Steinkjer Municipality.
