= Halfdan Haneborg Hansen =

Norwegian military officer (1890–1974)

Halfdan Haneborg Hansen OBE
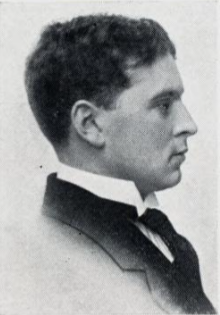
- Born: 1 October 1890; Kristiania, Norway
- Died: 1974 (aged 83–84)
- Occupations: Military officer Milorg pioneer Businessman
- Awards: Legion of Honour; Croix de Guerre; Order of the British Empire; Defence Medal 1940–1945; Haakon VII 70th Anniversary Medal

Halfdan Haneborg Hansen OBE (1 October 1890 – 1974) was a Norwegian military officer, Milorg pioneer and businessman.

== Personal life ==
Haneborg Hansen was born in Kristiania to priest Julius Hansen and Aurora Laurine Haneborg. He was married twice, first to Mimi Blikstad, a daughter of businessman and politician Magnus Blikstad, and in a second marriage to Aagot Marie Jansen. He graduated from the Norwegian Military Academy in 1911, and as chemical engineer from the Karlsruhe Institute of Technology in 1917.

== Second World War ==
During the Norwegian Campaign in 1940, Haneborg Hansen commanded a battalion in Eastern Norway. Later in 1940 he cooperated with Olaf Helset and they established an early resistance organization, which later became part of Milorg. He was arrested in 1941, but escaped from custody in January 1942, and fled to neutral Sweden and then to the United Kingdom. From 1943 he served as military attaché at the Norwegian embassy in London. After the war he was running a business in Oslo.

== Awards ==
Haneborg Hansen was decorated Officer of the French Legion of Honour and Officer of the Order of the British Empire, and received the French Croix de Guerre. He was awarded the Norwegian Defence Medal 1940–1945 and Haakon VII 70th Anniversary Medal, as well as the British Defence Medal.
