= Einar Amdahl =

Norwegian theologian (1888–1974)

Einar Amdahl (3 March 1888 – 22 May 1974) was a Norwegian theologian. Einar Amdahl led the Norwegian Missionary Society for more than 30 years.

== Biography ==
He was born in Selbu Municipality in Trøndelag, Norway. He was the son of Peder Einarsen Amdahl (1863–1942) and Marit Bardosdatter (1862–1942). He was raised in a Haugean movement home. He attended Hans Nielsen Hauge Minde in Kristiania and graduated in 1910. He was ordained a priest in 1916 and was called to the newly created position of assistant secretary general of the Norwegian Missionary Society (Det Norske Misjonsselskap). He served as secretary-general for the society from 1923. Amdahl resigned from his office in 1957 to be replaced by Fridtjov Søiland Birkeli.

During the German occupation of Norway, he participated in the Norwegian resistance movement, and served in an internment camp from June 1944 until the end of World War II. He was decorated Knight, First Class of the Order of St. Olav in 1963.
