= Camilla Granlien =

Norwegian singer

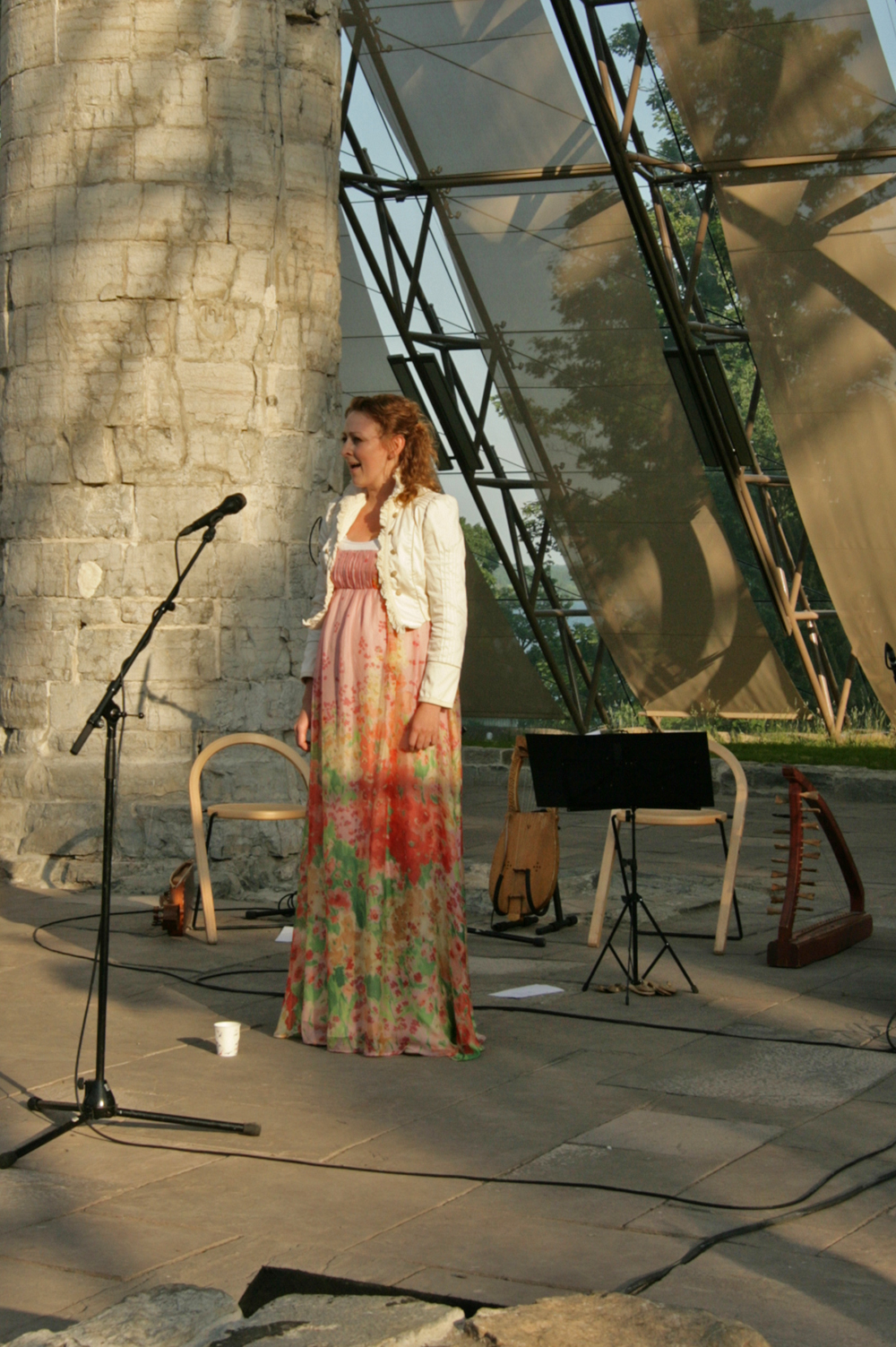
- Born: 3 November 1974 (age 51); Elverum, Norway
- Education: Voss Folk High School; Ole Bull Academy; Telemark University College
- Occupation: folk singer

Camilla Granlien (born 1974) is a Norwegian folk singer, stev performer and educator.

She was born in Elverum Municipality, and has studied music at the Voss Folk High School, the Ole Bull Academy, and the Telemark University College. She has worked as song teacher at the Norwegian Academy of Music, and at secondary schools in Vinstra and Gjøvik. She has participated in various musical groups, and made her solo album debut in 2005 with the album Begjær. Her album Jarnnetter from 2008 is based on lyrics by poets Tor Jonsson and Olav Aukrust, with a mixture of traditional melodies and music composed by Granlien. In 2011 she published the album Aftenstemning, a collaboration with jazz saxophonist Kristin Sevaldsen, with lyrics by Bjørnstjerne Bjørnson, including songs such as "Treet", "O visste du bare" and "Dulgt kjærlighet". In 2013 she participated on the album Songs by Geirr Tveitt, along with other artists.

Granlien won first prize in the vocal folk music class in the musical contest Landskappleiken in 2006, 2007 and 2008.
