= Eivind Groven =

Norwegian composer of classical music

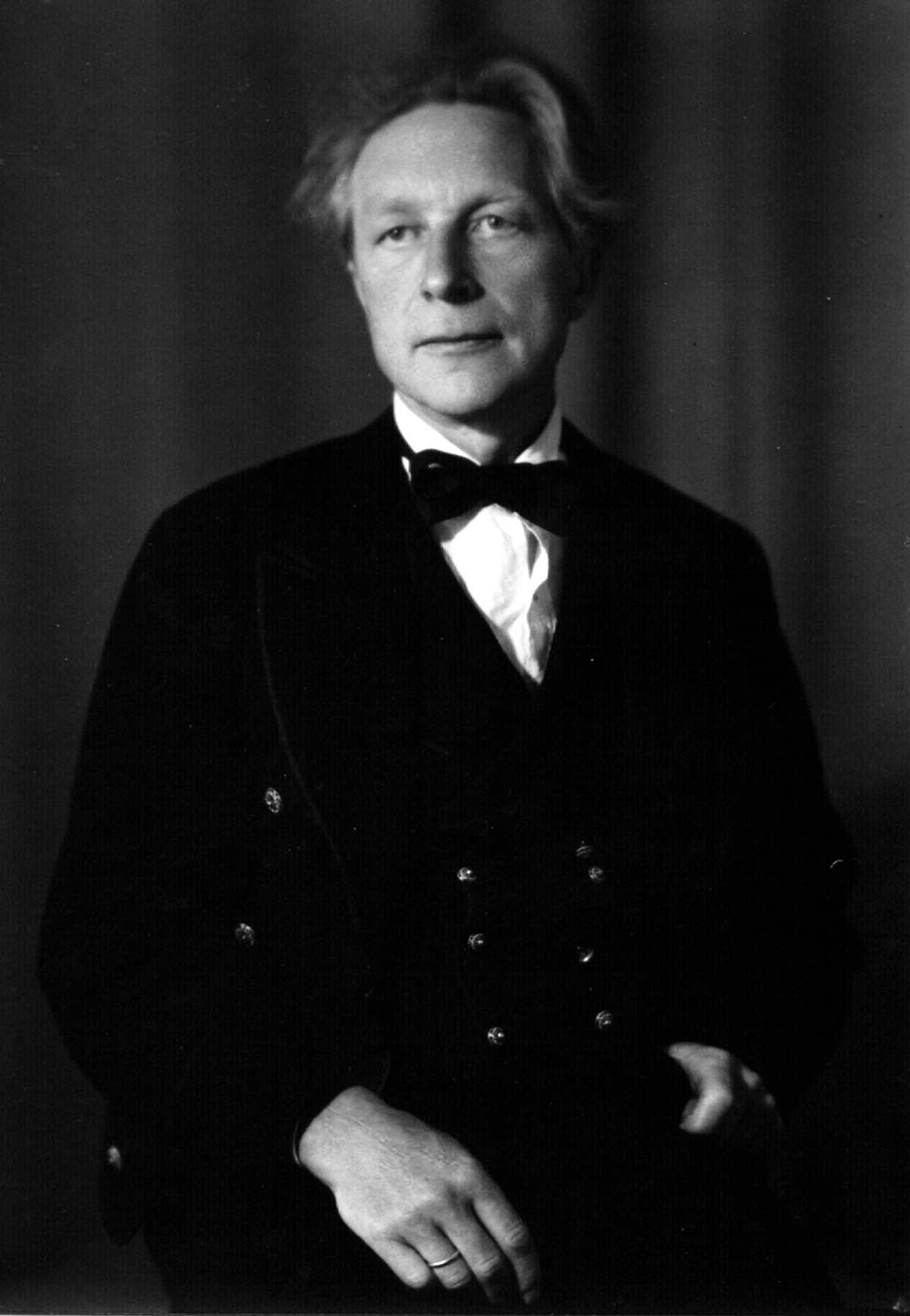
- Groven in 1951.

Background information
- Born: 8 October 1901; Eidsborg, Laardal Municipality, Norway
- Origin: Norway
- Died: 8 February 1977 (aged 75) Oslo, Norway
- Genres: Classical, traditional folk music
- Occupations: Musician, composer
- Instrument: Hardingfele
- Website: orgelhuset.org

Eivind Groven (8 October 1901 – 8 February 1977) was a Norwegian composer and music-theorist. He was from the traditional region of Vest-Telemark and had a background in the folk music of the area.

== Biography ==
Groven was born in the village of Eidsborg in Laardal Municipality in Telemark, Norway. Groven's rural background was filled with traditional music. He came from a family of talented musicians and artists, prominent in his home area. His father, Olav Åsmundsson Gjøitil (1865–1947) was the youngest of eight siblings. Two of his father's brothers played the hardanger fiddle. His mother, Aslaug Rikardsdotter Berge (1863–1946), was the youngest daughter of Rikard Aslaksson Berge, known for preserving a great amount of old tunes, religious songs and dance-tunes and a friend of Myllarguten's. Two of Groven's maternal uncles also played the hardanger fiddle, and his mother's sisters, as well as Aslaug herself, were talented folk singers.

Groven was the youngest of five brothers. Two of his brothers began to play the fiddle, and soon Eivind joined them. His father Olav was also an apt player, and in their childhood, the brothers learned notes, and sometimes played together, when they got their hands on classical sheet music. Otherwise, local folk music ruled. As Eivind grew up, he understood the value of writing down the tunes he heard from other fiddlers, and in this way, he soon gained great knowledge. At the age of 16, Groven was infected with a serious case of wet gangrene in the lungs and barely survived it. During his reconvalescent period, he studied music and played the fiddle. He later recalled: "I was free to do whatever I wished in that time".

Eivind Groven studied at Notodden to become a teacher, but soon abandoned this. Starting in the autumn of 1925, he studied musical theory and composition at the Oslo Conservatory of Music mostly Berlioz and Beethoven. He held Beethoven in highest esteem for the rest of his life, and wished for the 9th symphony anthem to be played at his funeral. Unlike many other young Norwegian composers at the time, he refused to go abroad, but stayed at home composing, and developing his own distinct musical forms, based on a merging of the sonata form with the special metamorphic principles unique to the dance music from Telemark, closely related to the forms of late baroque.

In 1931, Groven was appointed by the Norwegian Broadcasting Company, NRK, to be responsible for half an hour of folk music every week. This allowed him to broadcast many rural musicians to the radio, helping to preserve the folk music for posterity. Reactions from the urban public were harsh and unfriendly. Debates intensified, and people living in Oslo mostly expressed their disgust for this "barbaric music". Groven worked on, said little, as was his way, but it is known that he silently burnt all the hate-mail. He received great and valuable support from his original rural community, and from his family.

From 1938 and into World War II, Groven started his work on just intonation, which resulted in his special organ, completed in 1952. Albert Schweitzer wrote to Groven and wished he could try this organ, and when he was granted the Nobel Peace Prize, he seized the opportunity. He exclaimed that a great organ had to be built.

During the Occupation of Norway by Nazi Germany, Groven resigned his post in NRK after a brief and unwelcome encounter in his studio with Joseph Goebbels. After WWII, Groven participated in editing and publishing seven volumes of written and collected tunes for hardanger fiddle, along with two fellow folk musicians in Norway. The work was completed after their deaths. Groven was the brother-in-law of author Ingeborg Refling Hagen (1895–1989). This resulted in a fruitful artistic relationship and Groven created music based on the texts written by his sister-in-law. Groven continued composing, and was in later years greatly admired for his musical style and his use of the orchestra.

=== Folk music ===
Eivind Groven began writing down fiddle tunes from an early age. During his life, he collected some 2000 fiddle tunes from various parts of the country. He worked as a consultant in NRK, and here, he was instrumental in creating a folk music archive, and in getting the company proper facilities for recording. The first recordings are dated 1936. From those recordings, he wrote down a number of tunes.

In 1954, a committee was formed for editing and publication of Norwegian folk music in print. The result of this work is a seven volume series of Norwegian Hardanger fiddle tunes, finished after Groven's death. In this work, Groven was the central expert, editing and piecing together tunes into larger groups, regular families of dance tunes. The work would have been impossible without his contribution, and he worked on this until he was unable to write anymore, about 1973. The financial compensation for this was sparse, and the project was nearly shut down. When the other members of the committee died, Groven worked on alone.

== Musical style ==
Groven's musical style is heavily influenced by his folk music background, both harmonic and formal. The blue notes common in folk music were often compensated in classical orchestra through imaginative use of overtones and in orchestration. Groven's harmonies reflects often the harmonies of the hardanger fiddle, which is commonly played on two or even three strings at a time. He also extracted harmonies from the Norwegian cither, the langeleik, and the willow flute.

It has been pointed out that Groven's harmonic principles are not far from the principles of the early Flemish Renaissance composers, such as Dufay and Jacob Obrecht. Like them, he often uses the sixth-chord, with a third at the bottom. Groven often thinks rather polyphonically, and this can also be traced to the hardanger fiddle, as well as to his admiration for Bach.

In early years, critics accused him of atonality, but in fact, Groven's music is quite tonal. He can, however use drastic modulations, which in this context turn out as fairly logical. Apart from this, he uses the old modes that are present in traditional Norwegian music. One has to remember, though, that he never heard much of the early Flemish music, or even his older contemporary Stravinsky, and yet similarities can be found. Those similarities can be explained out of tonal feeling and tradition. Stravinsky in the early stage of his production used Russian folk music in an experimental way, like Groven.

Groven's form is metamorphic. He often uses a kind of fortspinnung, and turns themes over to new themes gradually, in a very organic way. Groven did not believe in the concept of absolute music. He stated rather that "all music is about something". Thus, one will find that most of his works are based on literature, poems or novels, or even plays. He wrote a number of songs over poems written by Henrik Wergeland, and choral works based on texts by the Norwegian novelist and playwright Hans E. Kinck (1865–1926) and poet Ingeborg Refling Hagen. His piano concerto and two symphonies are also based on works by the latter two authors.

Groven also composed music for hardanger fiddle, experimenting with new ways of tuning the instrument, and wrote a number of folk tune arrangements for his own organ, using blue scales and irregular intervals, not to be achieved on a regular equal-tempered piano. He wrote also a number of essays on the topics of pure tuning and the overtone scale, as well as an essay of his own invention, the pure-tuning automath.

== Personal life ==
In 1925, Groven married Ragna Hagen (1902–1960). He and Ragna had four children, Aslaug, Tone, Dagne and Gudmund. His older brother Olav Groven, an equally talented folk musician, died from pneumonia in 1928. His first wife Ragna died in 1960 and Groven was remarried two years later to Signe Taraldlien from Telemark. In the end, she outlived him by twenty years.

Groven developed Parkinson's disease in 1964, and had to put away the fiddle. The medications available at the time caused undue stress to his heart, and he died at the age of 75 in Oslo during the winter of 1977. He is buried alongside his first wife in the cemetery at Tangen Church in Hedmark.

== Selected compositions ==
=== Instrumental music ===
==== Orchestra ====
- Symphony No. 1, Op. 26: Innover viddene. 1938, 51.
- Symphony No. 2, Op. 34: Midnattstimen. 1946.
- Piano concerto, Op. 39a (1950)
- Fjelltonar, Op. 27 (Stutarlåt, Vinjesong, Siklebekken). 1938.
- Hjalarljod, Op, 38. 1950.
- Symfoniske slåttar No. 1, Op. 43. 1956.
- Faldafeykir No. 2, Op. 53. 1965.

==== Chamber music ====
- Solstemning for flute and piano. 1956.

==== Solo ====
- Capriccio for flute, Op. 24c. 1956.
- Solstemning for piano, Op. 37. 1948.

=== Songs ===
- Anden Aurikelsang, Op. 7. 1926.
- Å så rødblond, Op. 9. 1926.
- Men en kveld, Op. 12. 1929.
- Songs, Op. 13 (På hospitalet om natten, Anden nat på hospitalet, Moderens korstegn). 1930.
- Sommerfuglen, Op. 14. 1930.
- Songs, Op. 22 (Til min Gyldenlak, Serenade fra Venetianerne). 1934.

=== Chorus ===
- Paa hospitalet om natten for mixed chorus. 1952.
- På Heksmo for male chorus. 1931.
- Stenen i Stefanens pande for mixed chorus. 1932.
- Salme for male chorus. 1938?
- Hellige tone for female chorus. 1930s.
- Om kvelden for mixed chorus. chorus. 1930s.
- Fantegutten for mixed chorus. early 1930s.
- Den tyngste sorg og møda for mixed chorus. 1946.
- Hugen for mixed chorus. 1946.
- Guro rid til ottesong for mixed chorus. 1955.
- Barnets aasyn for mixed chorus. 1959.
- Bukkevisa for mixed chorus. 1950s.
- Olav Liljukrans for mixed chorus. 1960.
- Margjit Hjukse, Op. 48, for mixed chorus. 1964.
- Til Telemork for mixed chorus. 1963–64.

=== Chorus, soli and orchestra ===
- Brudgommen, Op. 16. 1933.
- Mot ballade, Op. 20. 1933.
- Draumkvædet, Op. 51. 1963.

== See also ==
- Stev, a form of Norwegian folk song
