= Henning H. Bergsvåg =

Norwegian poet and librarian

Henning Havnerås Bergsvåg (born 29 May 1974) is a Norwegian poet.

== Works ==
His early bibliography includes the poetry collections Newfoundland (2000) and Nattarbeid (2003), both on the publishing house Gyldendal, which he followed up with his only novel to date, Nemesis (2007). Bergsvåg then continued publishing poetry on Gyldendal in a steady pace, following up with Over elven Tweed (2010), Den engelske hagen (2013), Du er ikke her (2016) and Dette er ikke et stille sted (2020).

== Reception ==
Dette er ikke et stille sted was released in April 2020 via an online seminar, owing to COVID-19-related lockdown being in place in Norway at the time. It received reviews in five newspapers.
