= Pål Berrefjord =

Norwegian politician (born 1977)

Pål Berrefjord (born 11 April 1977 in Bergen) is a Norwegian politician for the Labour Party.

He served in the position of deputy representative to the Parliament of Norway from Hordaland during the term 2001–2005. In total he met during 55 days of parliamentary session.
