= 1976 in Norway =

- Centuries: 18th; 19th; 20th; 21st
- Decades: 1950s; 1960s; 1970s; 1980s; 1990s
- See also: List of years in Norway

Events in the year 1976 in Norway.

== Incumbents ==
- Monarch – Olav V.
- Prime Minister – Trygve Bratteli (Labour Party) until 15 January, then Odvar Nordli (Labour Party)

== Events ==
- 15 January – Odvar Nordli becomes Prime Minister of Norway
- 15 January – Nordli's Cabinet was appointed.
- 18 January – A 6.2-magnitude earthquake occurs in Svalbard.
- 25 May – Conscription age in Norway is lowered from 20 to 19 years of age.

== Popular culture ==
=== Literature ===
- Karin Bang, poet and novelist, is awarded the Aschehoug Prize literature award.
- Finn Carling, novelist, playwright, poet and essayist, is awarded the Gyldendal's Endowment literature prize.

== Notable births ==
=== January ===
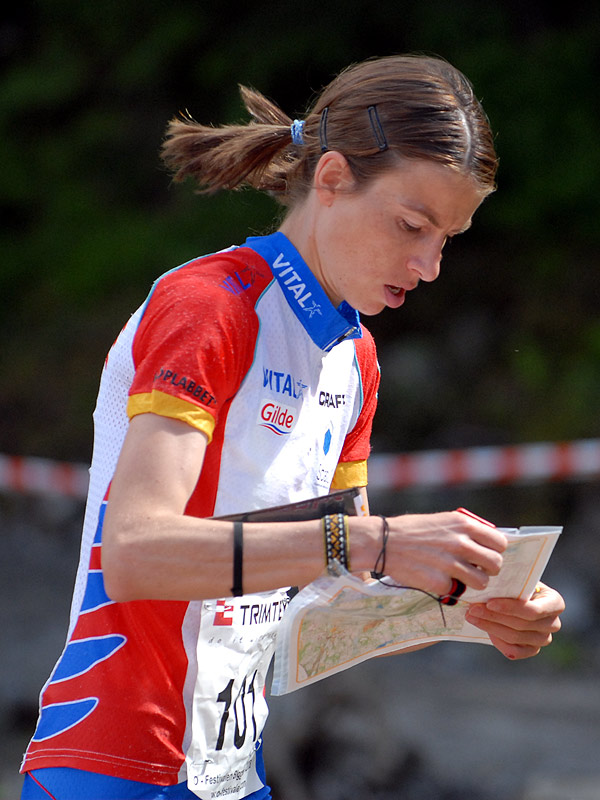
Anne Margrethe Hausken Nordberg

- 1 January – Iram Haq, film director.
- 4 January – Sigbjørn Skåden, novelist.
- 12 January – Gardar Eide Einarsson, contemporary artist.
- 14 January – Martin Knold, ice hockey player
- 20 January – Grete Ellingsen, politician.
- 22 January – Sivert Høyem, rock singer.
- 23 January – Anne Margrethe Hausken Nordberg, orienteer.
- 24 January – Stine Hjermstad Kirkevik, ski orienteer.
- 25 January – Grete Etholm, athlete.
- 26 January – Gard Steiro, newspaper editor.
- 28 January – Gunnar Norebø, footballer
- 29 January – Anders Baasmo Christiansen, actor.

=== February ===
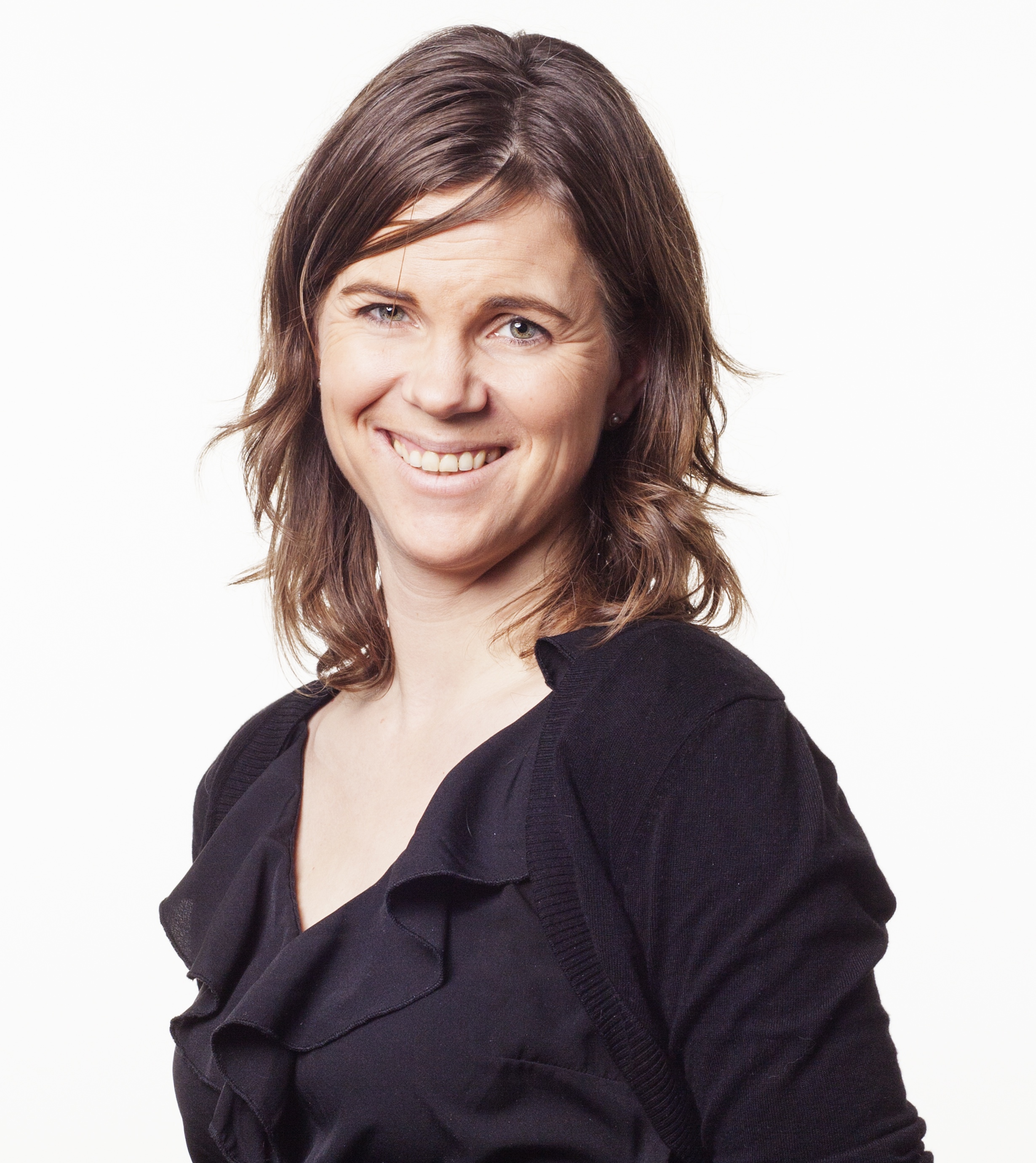
Solveig Schytz

- 3 February – Vinni, rapper.
- 5 February – Vibeke Saugestad, musician (born in Italy)
- 9 February – Marius Molaug, cartoonist and children's writer.
- 11 February – Simon Stranger, author.
- 11 February – Kristine Klaveness, rower.
- 13 February – Saint Thomas, musician (died 2007)
- 13 February – Steffen Sørum, novelist and children's writer.
- 14 February – Jens Arne Svartedal, cross-country skier.
- 14 February – Liv Kristine Espenæs, singer
- 17 February – Svein Berge, electronic musician
- 18 February – Benny Olsen, footballer
- 19 February – Solveig Schytz, politician.
- 19 February – Ingelin Røssland, children's writer.
- 22 February – Tjodalv, metal musician
- 22 February – Kristine Bjerknes, rower
- 25 February – Karl Strømme, jazz trumpeter
- 26 February – Hilde Hagerup, author.
- 27 February – Asbjørn Rydland, fantasy writer.
- 28 February – Audun Grønvold, alpine and freestyle skier (died 2025).

=== March ===
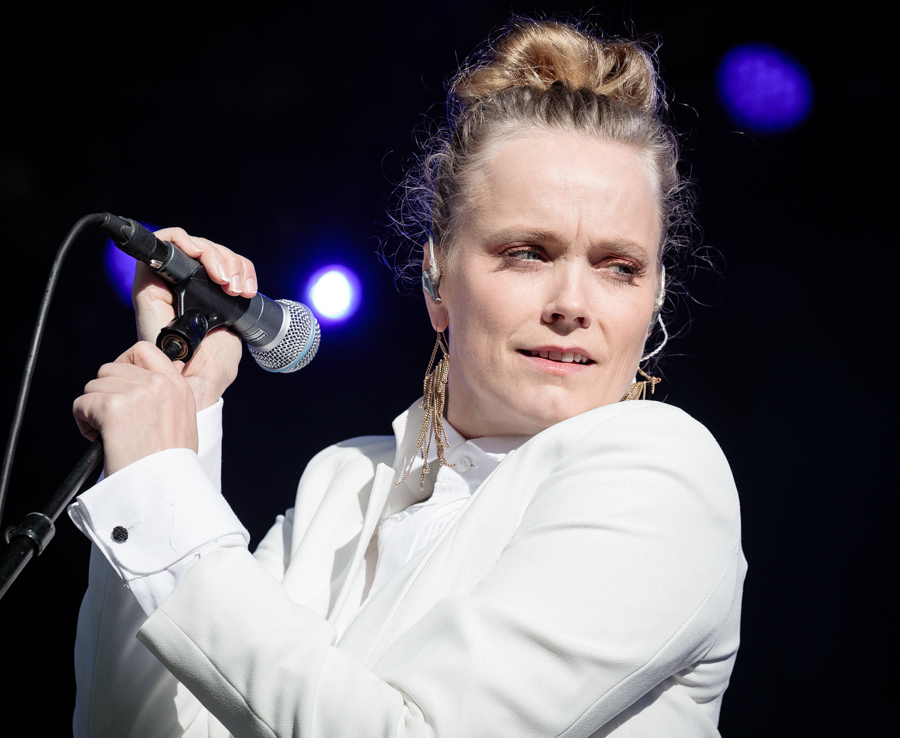
Ane Brun

- 1 March – Andreas Mjøs, musician
- 2 March – Gina Aspenes, singer
- 3 March – Torbjørn Anderssen, furniture designer.
- 3 March – Frode Lafton, footballer.
- 8 March – Vanessa Rudjord, magazine editor.
- 9 March – Pål Strand, footballer.
- 9 March – Herman Vogt, composer
- 10 March – Ane Brun, singer-songwriter
- 13 March – Irina Lee, non-fiction writer.
- 14 March – Christian Michelsen, footballer and manager
- 15 March – Ole Andreas Nilsen, footballer.
- 16 March – Kjetil Wæhler, footballer.
- 17 March – Pål Johnsen, ice hockey player
- 18 March – Espen Solheim, footballer
- 19 March – Thom Hell, musician.
- 20 March – Kristian Hammer, Nordic combined skier
- 21 March – Ingelin Noresjø, politician.
- 21 March – Geir Moen, cartoonist.
- 22 March – Marita Sølberg, opera singer.
- 22 March – Trond Iversen, cross-country skier
- 23 March – Unni Løvlid, fiddler
- 26 March – Eirik Verås Larsen, canoeist.

=== April ===
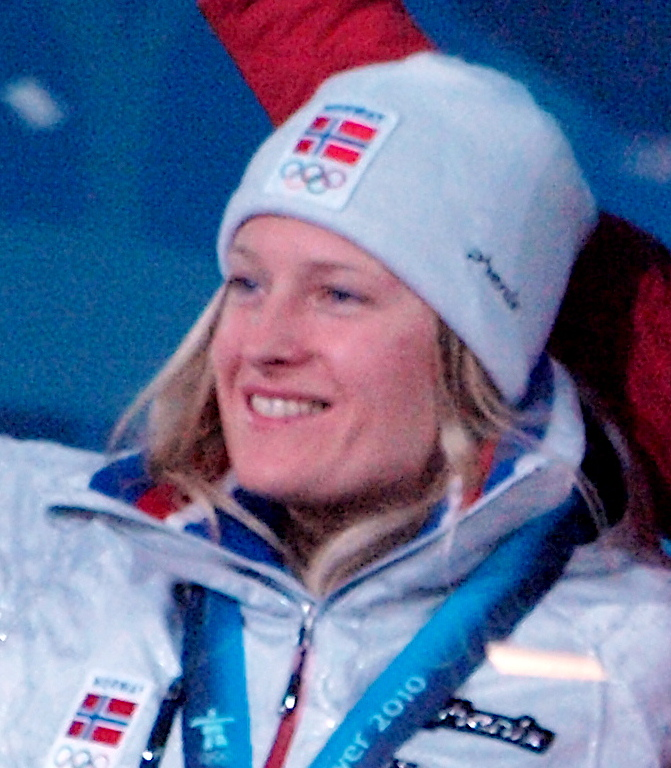
Hedda Berntsen

- 1 April – Tor Egil Horn, footballer
- 3 April – Claus Mørch, fencer
- 5 April – Sverre Koren Bjertnæs, painter.
- 8 April – Gabriel Rasch, cyclist.
- 9 April – Nils Axle Kanten, cartoonist.
- 9 April – Sturle Holseter, ski jumper
- 10 April – Jan Werner Danielsen, singer (died 2006)
- 11 April – Marta Breen, non-fiction writer.
- 11 April – Eirik Øwre Thorshaug, politician
- 12 April – Knut Anders Sørum, singer
- 12 April – Kenneth Larsen, ice hockey player
- 15 April – Aldrahn, metal musician
- 17 April – Dag Haug, linguist
- 17 April – Kjetil Steensnæs, musician
- 19 April – Kristian Norheim, politician.
- 20 April – Cecilie Gotaas Johnsen, cyclist
- 21 April – Geir Halnes, poet.
- 24 April – Hedda Berntsen, alpine and freestyle skier
- 25 April – Karina Hollekim, base jumper.
- 27 April – Olaf Tufte, rower.
- 28 April – Ravi, musician.

=== May ===
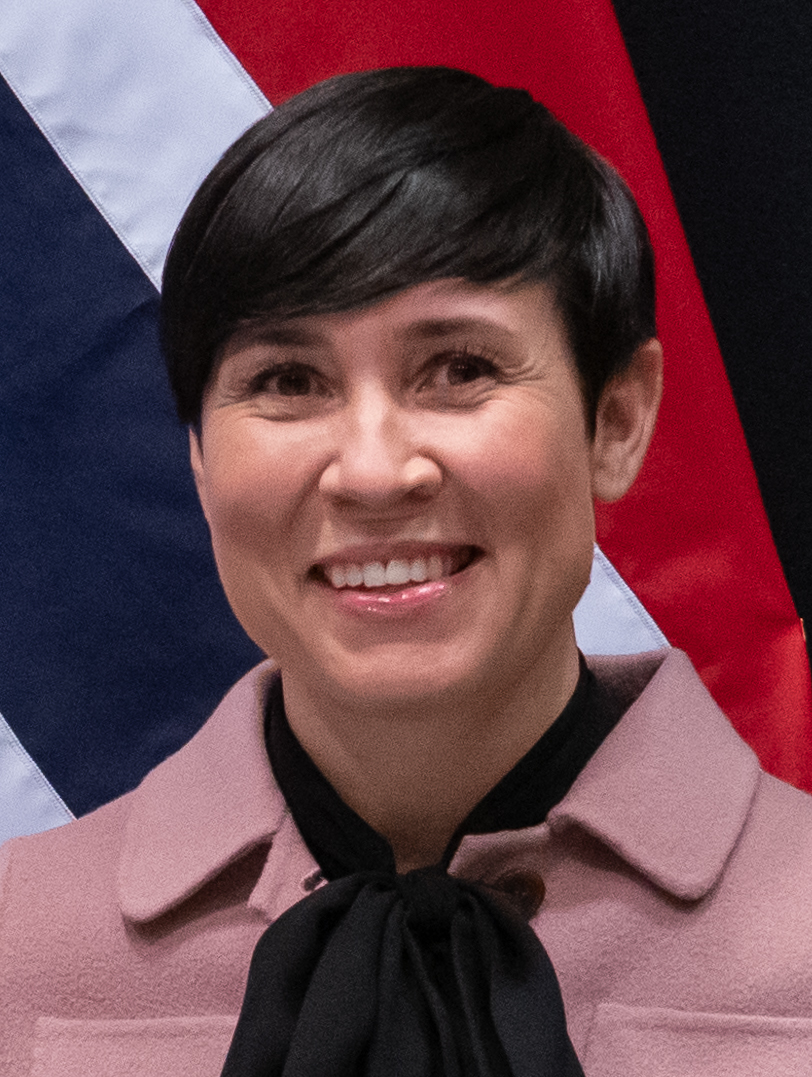
Ine Marie Eriksen Søreide

- 2 May – Ine Marie Eriksen Søreide, politician.
- 5 May – Torgeir Ekerholt Sæveraas, historian and novelist.
- 5 May – Anne Therese Tveter, speed skater
- 7 May – Anders Juliussen, footballer
- 8 May – Kim Christiansen, snowboarder
- 13 May – Kine Elisabeth Steinsvik, Supreme Court justice.
- 13 May – Lars Nedland, metal musician
- 14 May – Skatebård, musician.
- 14 May – Øystein Martinsen, actor
- 15 May – Gaute Helstrup, footballer
- 18 May – Jan-Are Larsen, golfer
- 22 May – Ingrid Storholmen, poet.
- 24 May – Silje Vige, singer
- 24 May – Synnøve Macody Lund, actress
- 26 May – Thomas Røed, footballer
- 26 May – Johan Mjønes, novelist.
- 27 May – Guri Størvold, politician.
- 28 May – Marie-Helene H. Brandsdal, politician.
- 29 May – Hilde Anita Nyvoll, politician.
- 31 May – Roar Ljøkelsøy, ski jumper.

=== June ===
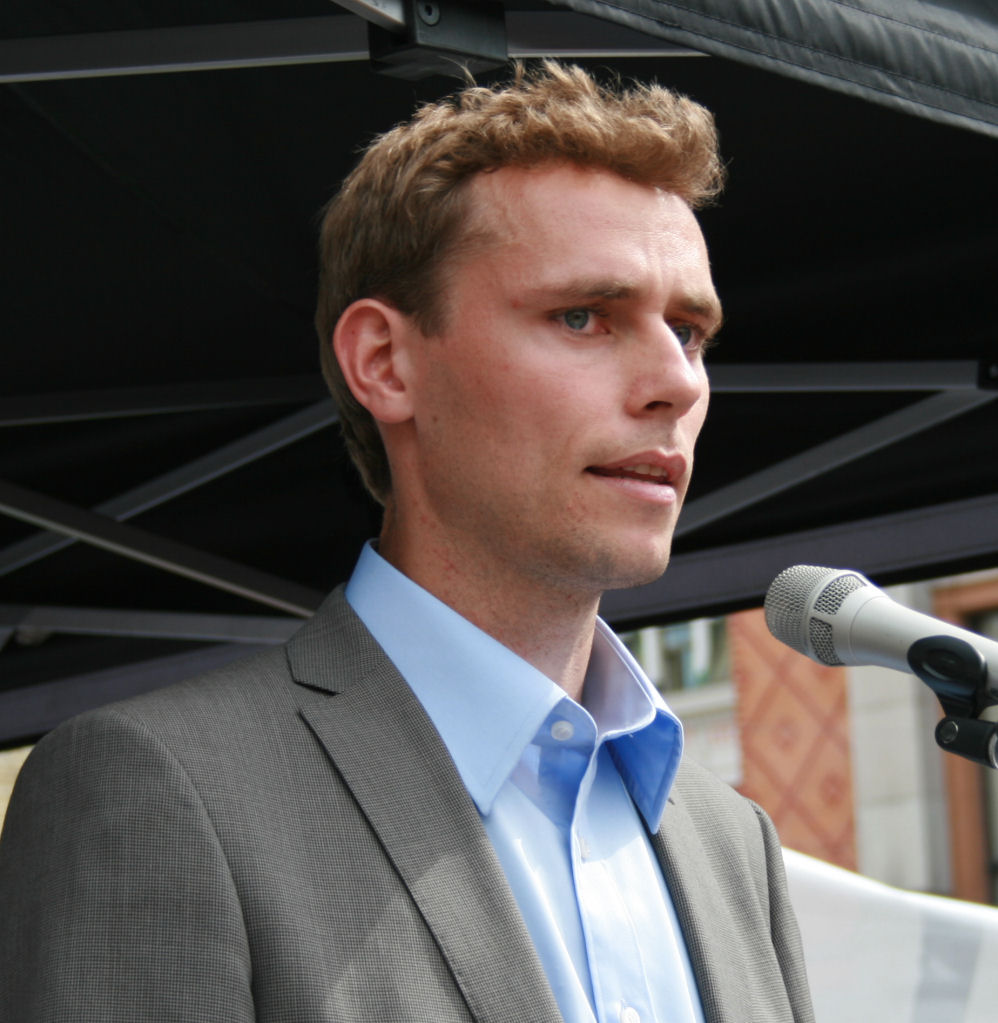
Ola Borten Moe

- 1 June – Marius Trygg, ice hockey player
- 1 June – Mats Trygg, ice hockey player
- 3 June – Hilde Louise Asbjørnsen, singer
- 3 June – Roger Arntzen, jazz bassist
- 6 June – Ola Borten Moe, politician.
- 8 June – Gro Kvinlog, alpine skier
- 12 June – Kristian Brenden, ski jumper
- 12 June – Zsuzsa Fey, orienteer (born in Romania)
- 14 June – Brynjard Tristan, metal musician
- 15 June – Idar Mathiassen, footballer
- 17 June – Kjetil Møster, jazz musician.
- 17 June – Stian Johansen, poet.
- 18 June – Dirge Rep, metal musician
- 20 June – Maren Hersleth Holsen, politician.
- 22 June – Silja Ekeland Bjørkly, politician
- 25 June – Desirée Sparre-Enger, singer (born in the Solomon Islands)
- 26 June – Mette Davidsen, handball player
- 27 June – Jarle Bernhoft, musician.
- 30 June – Zahid Ali, comedian.

=== July ===
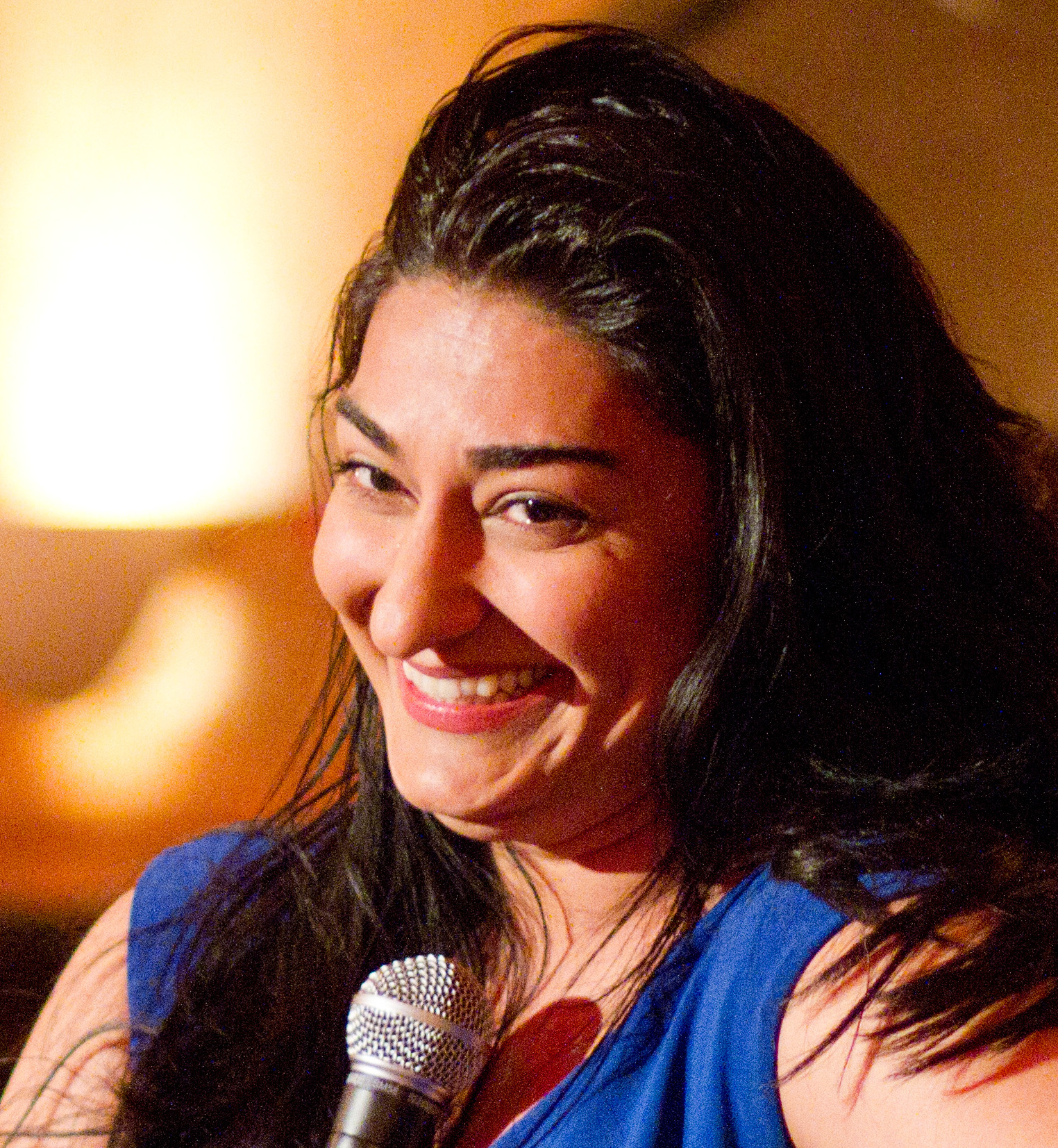
Shabana Rehman Gaarder

- 1 July – Karoline Borgersen, tennis player
- 2 July – Simen Berntsen, ski jumper
- 2 July – Inga Marte Thorkildsen, politician.
- 5 July – Marthe Scharning Lund, politician.
- 8 July – Erlend Kaasa, novelist.
- 14 July – Shabana Rehman, comedian (born in Pakistan) (died 2022).
- 14 July – Erik Dæhlin, composer
- 15 July – Guri Solberg, television presenter
- 15 July – Ragnhild Male Hartviksen, politician.
- 18 July – Lene Aanes, wrestler.
- 20 July – Harald Solberg, politician.
- 23 July – Aleksander Gamme, mountaineer.
- 23 July – Øyvind Torvund, composer.
- 26 July – Diaz, rapper.
- 31 July – Stian Bjørge, speed skater.

=== August ===
- 5 August – Remi Sølvberg, politician
- 6 August – Andreas Gjersøe, canoeist.
- 7 August – Endre Hellestveit, actor.
- 8 August – Olaf Olsen, rock drummer.
- 8 August – Hans Erik Ramberg, footballer
- 8 August – Kristian Sørli, footballer
- 8 August – Stian Thomassen, footballer.
- 9 August – Einar Håndlykken, environmentalist.
- 9 August – Erlend Flornes Skaret, novelist.
- 15 August – Sigmund Hagen, politician.
- 17 August – Anders Rambekk, footballer
- 18 August – Mala Wang-Naveen, writer.
- 18 August – Øystein Vidnes, novelist.
- 24 August – Sondre Krogtoft Larsen, actor.
- 28 August – Håvard Sakariassen, footballer

=== September ===
- 4 September – Vegard Sannes, footballer
- 4 September – Gro-Anita Mykjåland, politician.
- 7 September – Kim Larsen, footballer
- 9 September – Kristoffer Rygg, metal musician
- 13 September – Edward Schultheiss, actor.
- 17 September – Espen Dietrichson, sculptor
- 20 September – Espen Grjotheim, musical actor
- 21 September – Jonas Ueland Kolstad, footballer
- 22 September – Vidar Vang, musician
- 22 September – Siri Amalie Oftestad, poet.
- 25 September – Opaque, rapper.
- 30 September – Jon Øystein Flink, author.

=== October ===
- 1 October – Ivar Grydeland, jazz guitarist.
- 2 October – Ingvild Holvik, novelist.
- 2 October – Freddy dos Santos, footballer.
- 8 October – Lars Blixt, footballer
- 10 October – Kaia Storvik, journalist and politician.
- 10 October – Stella Getz, singer (born in Nigeria)
- 10 October – Bård Glad Pedersen, politician.
- 15 October – Bård Ludvig Thorheim, politician.
- 15 October – Bergljot Kaslegard, author.
- 15 October – Tom Kristoffersen, footballer
- 17 October – Kjartan Salvesen, singer
- 17 October – Espen Johnsen, politician.
- 18 October – Galder, metal musician
- 19 October – Monica Isakstuen, writer.
- 21 October – Stian Theting, footballer

=== November ===
- 3 November – Stian Berger Røsland, politician.
- 8 November – Kristine Edner, footballer
- 10 November – Steffen Iversen, footballer.
- 11 November – Lise Selnes, politician.
- 11 November – Olympia Paus, polo player (born in Greece).
- 13 November – Nell Sigland, singer
- 13 November – David Hanssen, footballer
- 16 November – Øyvind Alapnes, football referee
- 18 November – Shagrath, metal musician
- 18 November – Bår Stenvik, non-fiction writer
- 19 November – Rebekka Karijord, musician and actress.
- 23 November – Tommy Stenersen, footballer
- 24 November – Frederik Garshol, footballer
- 29 November – Elisabeth Hilmo, handball player.

=== December ===
- 1 December – Agnete Kjølsrud, singer
- 2 December – Kim Deinoff, footballer
- 4 December – Ero Stig Karlsen, author.
- 6 December – Ole Børud, musician.
- 7 December – Leif Tsolis, football manager
- 10 December – Margrethe Røed, television presenter
- 11 December – Børge Hernes, footballer
- 12 December – Bjørn Vatne, novelist.
- 14 December – Mudassar Kapur, politician.
- 14 December – Kari Anne Moe, politician and film director
- 14 December – Knut Henry Haraldsen, footballer
- 18 December – Kathrine Maaseide, volleyball player
- 23 December – Terje Leonardsen, footballer
- 24 December – Christian Holm-Glad, film director
- 24 December – Tommy Marthinsen, ice hockey player
- 28 December – Trond Nymark, race walker.
- 29 December – Cecilie Seim, novelist and children's writer.

Full date missing

- Heidi Aassveen Halvorsen, handball player
- Ann Eli Tafjord, cross-country skier
- Stian Aarstad, metal musician
- Geir Aker, television presenter
- Bente Arntsen, powerlifter
- Teebee, electronic musician
- Arne-Johan Rauan, musician
- Thomas Aune, radio presenter
- Marco Elsafadi, activist
- Lise Finckenhagen, television chef
- Stian Floer, chef
- Runhild Gammelsæter, vocalist
- Mari Grydeland, writer
- Tom Victor Gausdal, chef
- Håvard Homstvedt, artist
- Benjamin Huseby, photographer
- Ingunn Haakonsen, powerlifter
- Anders Hoff, comedian and television presenter
- Ellen Kathrine Lie, speed skater
- Camilla Løw, contemporary artist
- Nina Kristin Flo, footballer
- Thomas Pettersen, handballer
- Ole Rolfsrud, television presenter
- Hallvard Notaker, historian
- Terje Sporsem, standup comedian
- Christine Sandtorv, musician
- Tommy Sharif, businessperson
- Marit Strømøy, offshore boat racer
- Sigrid Sollund, television presenter
- Christina Undhjem, singer
- Jonas Wille, handball coach
- Kristine Beate Walhovd, neuropsychologist
- Håkon Thelin, composer
- Mikal Telle, music label owner

== Notable deaths ==
- 2 January – Leif J. Sverdrup, civil engineer and military officer (b. 1898, died in the US)
- 17 January – Marie Louise Middelthon, literary critic (b. 1883)
- 15 January – Rolf Aakervik, politician and editor (b. 1915)
- 18 January – Folke Bålstad, football referee (b. 1907)
- 25 January – Gunnar Holmsen, geologist (b. 1880)
- 30 January – Erik Kristen-Johanssen, jurist and theatre director (b. 1901)
- 30 January – Håkon Nilsen, naval commander (b. 1913)
- 5 February – Harald Stenerud, athlete (b. 1897)
- 5 February – Adolph Wold, footballer (b. 1892)
- 14 February – Paul René Gauguin, painter (b. 1911, died in Spain)
- 18 February – Ingemund Berulvson, sculptor (b. 1900)
- 18 February – Arne Gaupset, wrestler (b. 1894)
- 20 February – Erling Asbjørn Kjellsby, composer (b. 1901)
- 24 February – Torbjørn Navelsaker, engineer (b. 1917)
- 1 March – Bjørn Hougen, archaeologist (b. 1898)
- 2 March – Narve Bonna, ski jumper (b. 1901)
- 2 March – Kirsten Heiberg, actress (b. 1907)
- 7 March – Rolf Kaarby, Nordic combined skier (b. 1909)
- 8 March – Rolf Otto Andvord, diplomat (b. 1890, died in Spain)
- 10 March – Einar Ræder, long jumper (b. 1896)
- 12 March – Petter Carl Reinsnes, politician (b. 1904)
- 13 March – Max Tau, literary historian (b. 1897)
- 21 March – Vidar Lindboe-Hansen, ski jumper (b. 1920)
- 24 March – Arvid Nilssen, actor, revue artist and singer (b. 1913)
- 28 March – Rolf Rode Koren, politician (b. 1890)
- 1 April – Lars Søraas, Jr., conductor (b. 1887)
- 2 April – Birger Hønningstad, aviation engineer (b. 1904)
- 4 April – Nils Emaus Nilsen, politician (b. 1886)
- 5 April – Kirsten Brunvoll, writer (b. 1895)
- 7 April – Oskar Sylte, industrialist (b. 1907).
- 8 April – Brynjulv Sjetne, politician (b. 1917)
- 19 April – Tor Hoff, painter (b. 1925)
- 19 April – Thora Grahl-Nielsen, politician (b. 1901)
- 20 April – Gunnar G. Helland, fiddlemaker (b. 1889, died in the US)
- 20 April – Knut Hermundstad, folklorist (b. 1888).
- 27 April – Edvard Drabløs, actor and theatre director (b. 1883)
- 29 April – Einar Sommerfeldt, rower (b. 1889)
- 30 April – Edvard Fliflet Bræin, composer (b. 1924)
- 5 May – Børre Ulrichsen, architect (b. 1895)
- 6 May – Sigurd Nørstebø, educationalist (b. 1905).
- 7 May – Ingemann Torp, industrialist (b. 1894)
- 7 May – Knut Bengtson, sailor (b. 1919)
- 9 May – Jens Bjørneboe, writer (b. 1920)
- 10 May – Elias Aslaksen, religious leader (b. 1888)
- 12 May – John Norem, politician (b. 1888)
- 12 May – Sverre Hagerup Bull, composer (b. 1892)
- 13 May – Jahn Brochmann Halvorsen, diplomat (b. 1916, died in France)
- 19 May – Tønnes Oksefjell, politician (b. 1901)
- 19 May – Theo Findahl, teacher and journalist (b. 1891).
- 20 May – Sigurd H. Jacobsen, politician (b. 1893).
- 24 May – "Arvid Noe", AIDS victim (b. 1946).
- 27 May – Jean Heiberg, painter (b. 1884)
- 28 May – Dagfinn Flem, newspaper editor (b. 1906)
- 30 May – Niels Ødegaard, politician (b. 1892)
- 30 May – Ivar Werner Oftedal, mineralogist (b. 1894)
- 30 May – Reidar Bergh, sport official (b. 1885)
- 1 June – Karsten Heli, educator (b. 1898)
- 2 June – Trygve Diskerud, harness racer (b. 1903)
- 5 June – Asbjørg Borgfelt, sculptor (b. 1900)
- 5 June – Martin P. Vangsli, cross-country skier (b. 1903)
- 6 June – Øivin Davidsen, rower (b. 1891)
- 6 June – Ragnar Danielsen, bandleader (b. 1917)
- 8 June – Thorleif Schjelderup-Ebbe, scientist (b. 1894)
- 9 June – Thorleif Paus, consul (b. 1881)
- 11 June – Edith Meisel Aas, sculptor (b. 1927)
- 16 June – Ingrid Sandvik, politician (b. 1921)
- 17 June – Leif Rustad, musician and radio presenter (b. 1903)
- 18 June – Ingrid Christensen, explorer
- 19 June – Peder Ree Pedersen, politician (b. 1913)
- 24 June – Kåre Bergstrøm, film director (b. 1911)
- 27 June – Peter Bloch, athlete (b. 1923)
- 30 June – Thorvald Heggem, Nordic combined skier (b. 1907)
- 2 July – Per Wollebæk, author (b. 1910)
- 4 July – Håkon Hoff, newspaper editor and politician (b. 1898)
- 8 July – Dagfin Hermansen, painter (b. 1892)
- 11 July – Edith Aas, painter (b. 1924)
- 12 July – Borghild Berge Lexow, painter (b. 1898)
- 13 July – Einar Brun, marine biologist (b. 1936)
- 19 July – Oliver Dahl-Goli, politician (b. 1897)
- 28 July – Aksel Floer, sport official (b. 1901).
- 30 July – Sverre Offenberg Løberg, politician (b. 1905)
- 2 August – Elias E. Marøy, fishers' leader and politician (b. 1885)
- 3 August – Emil Lie, sculptor (b. 1897)
- 4 August – Hans Magnus Andresen, alpine skier (b. 1929)
- 5 August – Ole Mørk Sandvik, musicologist (b. 1875)
- 17 August – Andreas Eriksen, author (b. 1915)
- 19 August – Olav Kristian Strømme, priest and philanthropist (b. 1907)
- 19 August – Ole Grepp, actor (b. 1914)
- 26 August – Sigurd Eriksen, painter (b. 1884)
- 27 August – Herman Ruge, educationalist (b. 1883)
- 28 August – Einar Aaser, physician (b. 1886).
- 29 August – John Marius Trana, politician (b. 1898)
- 1 September – Bjørn Bjørnseth, equestrian (b. 1919)
- 4 September – Sverre Bernhard Nybø, politician (b. 1903)
- 4 September – Thoralf Evje, civil servant (b. 1902)
- 6 September – Berit Brænne, children's writer (b. 1918)
- 7 September – Birger Halvorsen, high jumper (b. 1905)
- 8 September – Helge Refsum, politician (b. 1897)
- 10 September – Lisbeth Nyborg, actress (b. 1887)
- 12 September – Hilmar Stigum, folklorist (b. 1897)
- 15 September – Carl Jacob Arnholm, legal scholar (b. 1899)
- 19 September – Erling Michelsen, wrestler (b. 1899)
- 20 September – Gudmund Didrik Schnitler, military officer (b. 1897).
- 21 September – Jens Salvesen, sailor (b. 1883)
- 24 September – Johannes Heimbeck, physician (b. 1892)
- 25 September – Gjermund Haugen, fiddler (b. 1914)
- 29 September – Nils Larsen, whaler (b. 1900)
- 4 October – Karl Trasti, politician (b. 1917)
- 5 October – Ragna Steinberg, painter (b. 1925)
- 11 October – Lars Onsager, physical chemist and theoretical physicist (b. 1903, died in the US)
- 14 October – Agvald Gjelsvik, educator (b. 1907)
- 16 October – Rasmus Breistein, film director (b. 1890, died in the US)
- 20 October – Christian Bernt Apenes, judge (b. 1889)
- 20 October – Kristian Langlo, politician (b. 1894)
- 23 October – Eivind Thon, newspaper editor (b. 1889)
- 28 October – Arve Moen, writer (b. 1912)
- 29 October – Max Herseth, rower (b. 1892, died in the US)
- 29 October – Kristian Moljord, politician (b. 1882)
- 30 October – Karianne Christiansen, alpine skier (b. 1949)
- 1 November – Oscar Egede-Nissen, actor (b. 1903)
- 13 November – Bjarne Eriksen, businessman (b. 1886)
- 14 November – Leif Jarmann Wilhelmsen, civil servant (b. 1910, died in Kenya)
- 15 November – Einar Molland, theologian (b. 1908)
- 27 November – Sven Arntzen, barrister (b. 1897, died in France)
- 25 November – Jens E. Ekornes, businessperson (b. 1908)
- 2 December – Gunnar Rollefsen, marine biologist (b. 1899)
- 7 December – Finn Lange, actor (b. 1895)
- 9 December – Thor Jensen, gymnast (b. 1880)
- 12 December – Steinar Hauge, veterinarian (b. 1914)
- 15 December – Aagot Gjems Guthormsen, politician (b. 1890)
- 15 December – Henrik A. Broch, diplomat (b. 1909)
- 17 December – Erling Larsson, politician (b. 1905)
- 18 December – Ole E. Nilsedalen, politician (b. 1905)
- 21 December – Odd Sørli, resistance member (b. 1912).
- 22 December – Guido Schjølberg, painter (b. 1886)
- 23 December – Kristian Fjeld, politician (b. 1887)
- 24 December – Rolf Erling "Rottenikken" Knutsen, criminal (b. 1912)
- 24 December – Monrad Norderval, bishop (b. 1902)
- 26 December – Bjarne Hansen, painter (b. 1890)
- 27 December – Ludvig G. Braathen, shipping and airline magnate (b. 1891)
- 29 December – Erik Eriksen, printmaker (b. 1923)
