= 1897 in Norway =

- Centuries: 17th; 18th; 19th; 20th; 21st
- Decades: 1870s; 1880s; 1890s; 1900s; 1910s
- See also: 1897 in Sweden; List of years in Norway

Events in the year 1897 in Norway.

== Incumbents ==
- Monarch: Oscar II.
- Prime Minister: Francis Hagerup

== Events ==
- The 1897 Parliamentary election takes place.

== Popular culture ==
=== Literature ===
- The play A Doll House was written by Henrik Ibsen.

== Births ==
=== January to March ===
- 2 January – Olaf Ditlev-Simonsen, sailor and Olympic silver medallist (died 1978)
- 8 January – Theodore Theodorsen, Norwegian-American aerodynamicist (died 1978)
- 11 February – Jacob Christie Kielland, architect (died 1972)
- 17 February – Torgeir Andreas Berge, politician (died 1973)
- 11 March – Knut Toven, politician (died 1980)
- 16 March – Bernhard Berthelsen, politician (died 1964)
- 22 March – Ivar Heming Skre, Norwegian resistance member

=== April to June ===
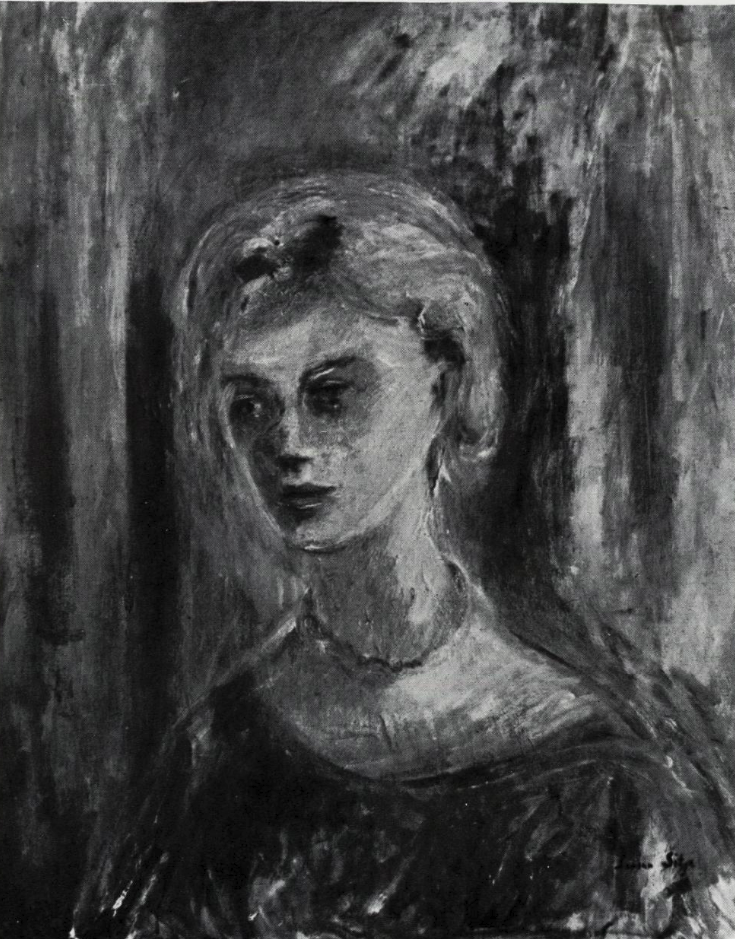
Joronn Sitje (self portrait 1926)

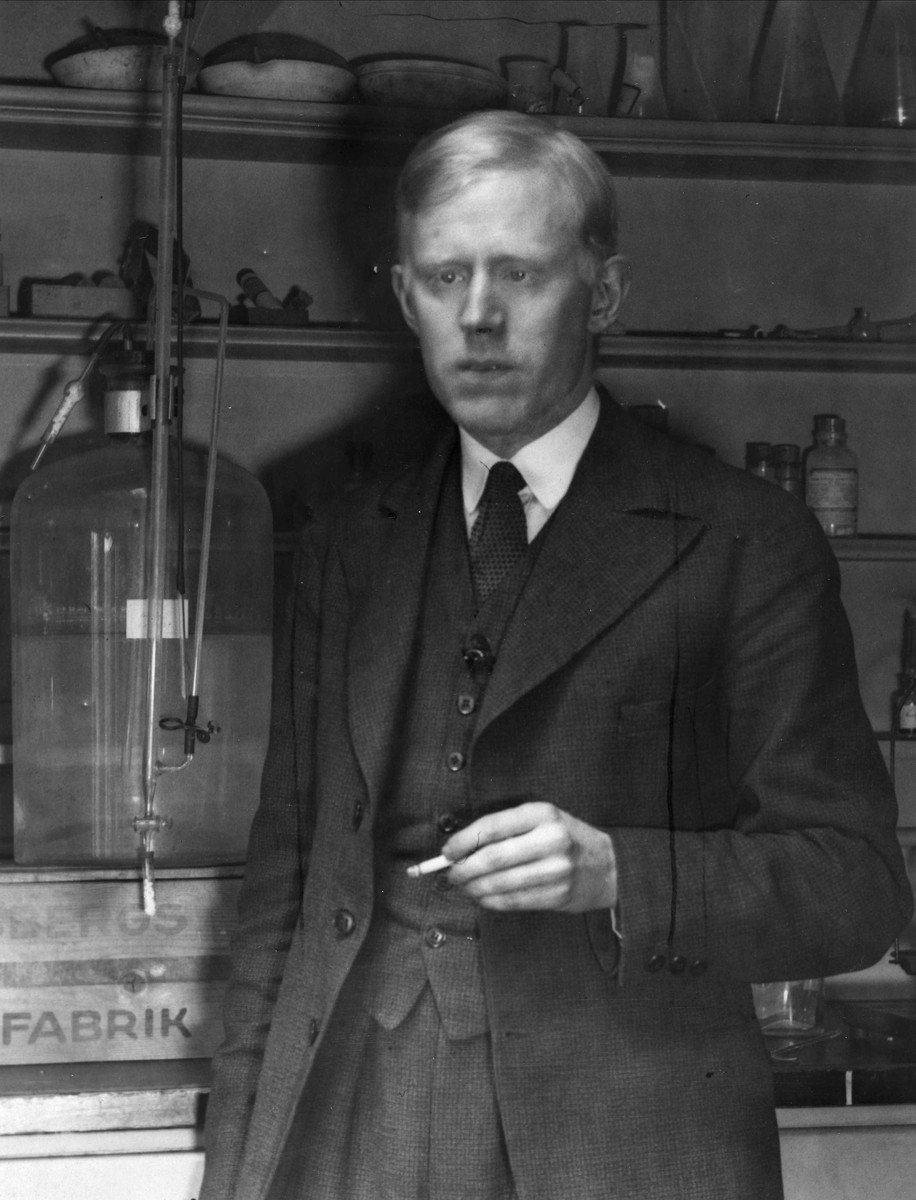
Odd Hassel

- 17 April – Harald Sæverud, composer (died 1992)
- 21 April – Odd Lindbäck-Larsen, military officer and war historian (died 1975).
- 30 April
  - Joronn Sitje, painter and illustrator (died 1982).
  - Johan Henrik Wiers-Jenssen, newspaper columnist and theatre director (died 1951)
- 1 May – Lauritz Schmidt, sailor and Olympic silver medallist (died 1970)
- 10 May – Harald Stenerud, hammer and discus thrower (died 1976)
- 15 May – Anton Olsen, rifle shooter and Olympic bronze medallist (died 1968)
- 17 May – Odd Hassel, physical chemist and Nobel Laureate (died 1981)
- 25 May – Rasmus Andreas Torset, politician (died 1965)
- 23 June
  - Trygve Knudsen, philologist, linguist and lexicographer (died 1968)
  - Einar Pettersen, sport wrestler (died 1966).

=== July to September ===
- 5 July – Ole H. Løvlien, politician (died 1970)
- 18 July – Per Gulbrandsen, rower and Olympic bronze medallist (died 1963)
- 22 July – Syvert Tobiassen Messel, politician (died 1978)
- 29 July – Emil Lie, sculptor (died 1976).
- 13 August – Oliver Dahl-Goli, politician (died 1976)
- 20 August – Sigvald Asbjornsen, Norwegian-American sculptor (died 1954)
- 4 September – Emil Boyson, poet, author, and translator (died 1979)
- 5 September – Olav Benum, politician (died 1990)

=== October to December ===
- 4 October – Einar Diesen, newspaper editor (died 1994).
- 14 October – Harald Strøm, speed skater and World Champion (died 1977).
- 17 October – Oskar Olsen, speed skater and Olympic silver medallist (died 1956)
- 29 October – Ivar Bae, politician (died 1967)
- 31 October – Sigurd Moen, speed skater and Olympic bronze medallist (died 1967)
- 6 November – Sverre Riisnæs, jurist, public prosecutor and collaborator (died 1988)
- 13 November – Ole Jørgensen, politician (died 1966)
- 14 November – Bjarne Guldager, sprinter (died 1971)
- 11 December – Astrid Tollefsen, poet (died 1973).
- 24 December – Gunnar Nygaard, broadcasting pioneer (died 1997).
- 26 December – Ingvald Svinsås-Lo, politician (died 1980)

=== Full date unknown ===
- Einar Dønnum, Nazi collaborator, executed (died 1947)
- Gunnar Berg, a national director of the Boy Scouts of America (died 1987)
- John Gunnarsson Helland, Hardanger fiddle maker (died 1977)
- Rolf Kiær, hydrographer (died 1975)
- Hilmar Reksten, shipping magnate (died 1980)
- Helge Thiis, architect and art critic (died 1972)
- Niels Werring, shipowner (died 1990)
- Hans Fredrik Wirstad, veterinarian (died 1983)

== Deaths ==
- 9 March – Sondre Norheim, skier and pioneer of modern skiing (born 1825)
- 25 September – Hjalmar Heiberg, physician and a professor (born 1837).

=== Full date unknown ===
- Hans Jensen Krog, politician (born 1808)
- Christian Tønsberg, bookseller, publisher and writer (born 1813)
