= Skaret =

Skaret may refer to:

== People ==
- Brage Skaret (born 2002), Norwegian footballer
- Erlend Flornes Skaret (born 1976), Norwegian novelist.

== Other uses ==
- Skaret Pass, mountain pass in Antarctica
