= Gjelsvik =

Gjelsvik is a surname. Notable people with the surname include:

- Agvald Gjelsvik (1907–1976), Norwegian educator and politician
- Kristin Gjelsvik (born 1986), Norwegian blogger and YouTuber
- Nikolaus Gjelsvik (1866–1938), Norwegian jurist and law professor
- Olav Gjelsvik (born 1956), Norwegian philosopher
- Sigbjørn Gjelsvik (born 1974), Norwegian politician
