= Strømme Foundation =

Norwegian non-profit volunteer development organization

The Strømme Foundation (Norwegian: Strømmestiftelsen) is a Norwegian volunteer development organization that was established on September 21, 1976. The foundation provides assistance to poor people in the Global South to pull themselves out of poverty through microfinancing. The vision of the Strømme Foundation is a world without poverty. Its head office is in Kristiansand.

== Activity ==
The Strømme Foundation conducts long-term development work with local partner organizations in the Global South. By giving people, among other things, knowledge and skills, access to small loans, and saving opportunities, the foundation helps make it possible for poor people to improve and build their lives so that they can get by without charitable assistance.

The foundation is active in 12 countries, where it carries out various development projects in education and microfinancing. The organization emphasizes self-help and utilizes local partners. Its head office is in Kristiansand, Norway. The foundation has three regional offices: in Kampala, Uganda; Bamako, Mali; and Colombo, Sri Lanka.

== History ==
The foundation is named after Olav Kristian Strømme, a priest and chaplain at Oddernes Church, who carried out extensive fundraising work. The foundation confers the Help for Self-Help Award (Hjelp til selvhjelp-prisen). The award was given to Nobel Peace Prize winner Muhammad Yunus in 1997. Proceeds from Operation Day's Work in 2008 went to the Strømme Foundation's Shonglap project for young people in Bangladesh. The Strømme Foundation has its own student exchange program called Act Now at Hald International Center, which the organization carries out together with the Norwegian Missionary Society and the Norwegian Christian Student and School Association.

== RE:ACT ==
RE:ACT is the Strømme Foundation's youth organization. It was established in October 2009 by former students at Hald International Center.
