= Diskerud =

Diskerud is a surname. Notable people with the surname include:

- Mix Diskerud (born 1990), Norwegian-born American soccer player
- Trygve Diskerud (1903–1976), Norwegian harness racer
