= Hald International Center =

Coordinates: 58°02′8.63″N 07°26′56.64″E

Hald International Center (Norwegian: Hald internasjonale senter) is a vocational school offering courses in cross-cultural understanding and international work. The school is owned by the Strømme Foundation, the Norwegian Missionary Society, and the Norwegian Christian Student and School Association, which each have their own exchange program. The academic program is a mix of theory and practice in which all of the students spend six to seven months of student traineeship in another culture. The school has about 40 Norwegian students and 20 students from abroad. The Norwegian students have their traineeship abroad, and the students from abroad have their traineeship in Norway. Those studying at Hald International Center are eligible for full loans and grants from the Norwegian State Educational Loan Fund. The school is located at the Hald Hotel just outside Mandal.

== Exchange programs ==
- The Norwegian Missionary Society administers the Connect exchange program and has slots in South Africa, Brazil, China, and Madagascar.
- The Strømme Foundation administers the Act Now exchange program and has slots in Uganda, Tanzania, and Nepal.
- The Norwegian Christian Student and School Association administers the Interact exchange program and has slots in Brazil, Colombia, Kenya, Madagascar and Nepal.

The students in the three exchange programs have a lot of classes in common, but they have some different focuses and therefore some classes are not shared. Much of the instruction takes place jointly for Norwegian and foreign students, but some is separate; for example, when foreign students have Norwegian classes.
