= Vagant =

Scandinavian literary magazine

Vagant is a Norway-based, pan-Scandinavian literary magazine, established in 1988.

Vagant.no publishes web-articles on a weekly basis, while the paper edition is released 4 times a year. Vagant is a member of the European cultural journal network Eurozine.

Vagant played an important role for the generation of Norwegian writers making their debut in the nineties, such as Ingvild Burkey, Karl Ove Knausgaard, Pål Norheim, and Linn Ullmann.

== History ==
The journal takes its name from the Norwegian word Vaganterne, which comes from the Latin clerici vagantes which describes a group of wandering students from the middle ages, who performed under the patronage of a wealthy nobleman or woman, and often their poems provoked the strict moral system of the church.

With its first publication in 1988, Vagant established itself as an independent journal in Oslo. Among the editors of the first couple of volumes were Torunn Borge, Alf van der Hagen, Henning Hagerup, Pål Norheim, and Linn Ullmann. In 1999 a parallel editorial group was established in Bergen, and each of the two editorial groups published two editions a year. In 2002 the Oslo office was shut down and for the next ten years the editorial office was located in Bergen. In 2013 the editorial office moved to Berlin. Since 2007 Audun Lindholm has been the chief editor of Vagant.

From 1996 to 2005 Vagant received economical support from the Norwegian publishing house Aschehoug. In 2005 Aschehoug terminated the collaboration and the journal found a new sponsor in N.W. Damm & Søn. A few years later Vagant was integrated into the new publishing house Cappelen Damm. In October 2016 it was announced that Vagant would become its own publisher from January 2017 on.

In 2009 the Internet initiative “Vagant Europa” was established, with an intention to publish and translate significant articles from the European literary and cultural debate.

In 2013 Vagant was chosen as the Norwegian journal of the year by Norsk Tidsskriftforening and in 2014 the magazine received the language prize Språkprisen from the national institution Norsk Språkråd, for having been a central force in Norwegian literature for the past 26 years, and, as the jury described it, for "its exemplary use of the Norwegian language".

In April 2017 Vagant merged with the Danish journal Salon 55, which then became a part of Vagant, and the editorial staff announced a further commitment to connect the public spheres of the Nordic countries.

== Selected previous members of the editorial staff ==
- Karl Ove Knausgaard
- Pål Norheim
- Tore Renberg
- Bår Stenvik
- Henning Hagerup
- Sigurd Tenningen
- Pedro Carmona Alvarez
- Steffen Kverneland
- Finn Iunker
- Gunnhild Øyehaug
