= Gunnhild Øyehaug =

Norwegian poet, writer and lecturer

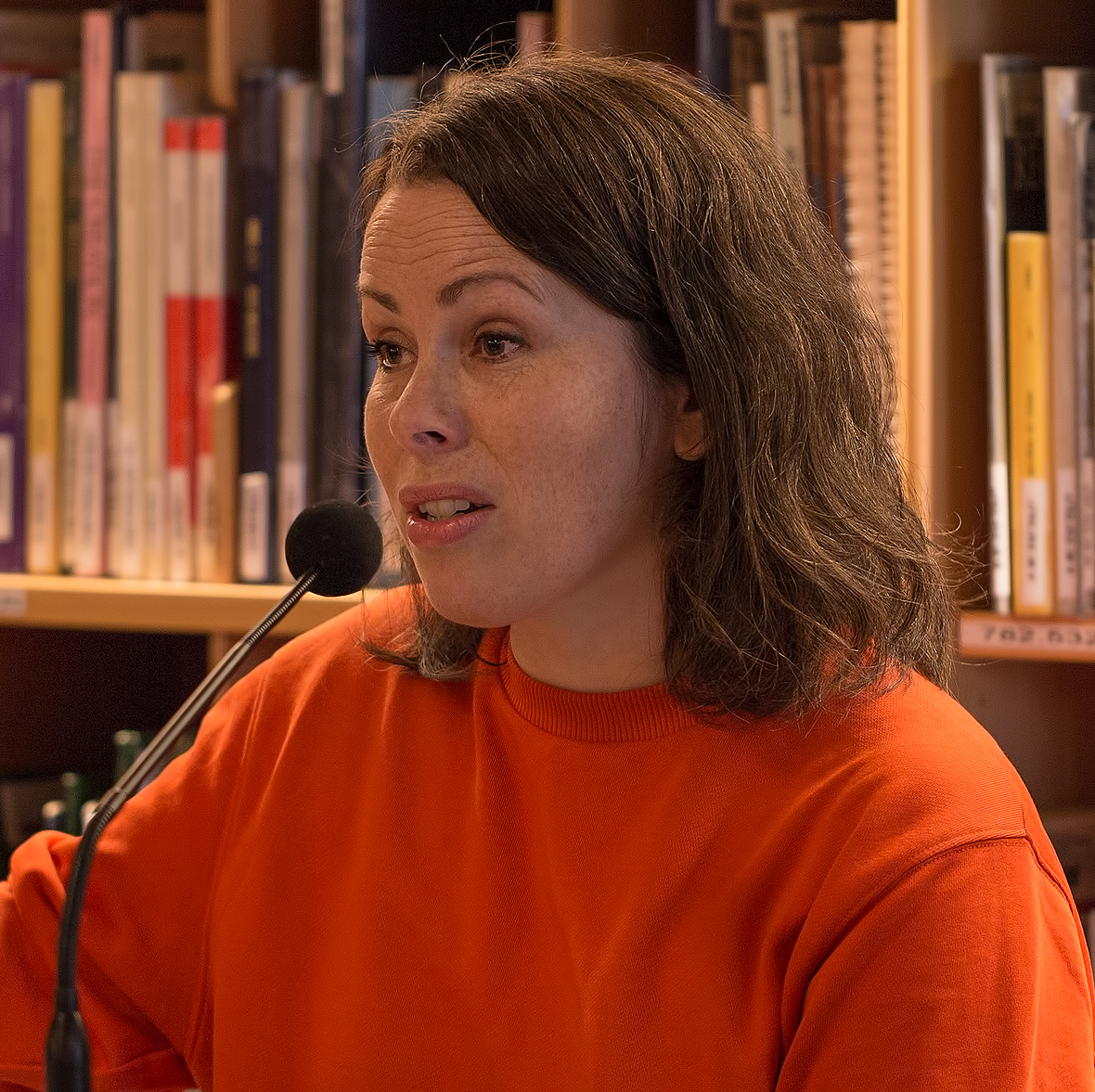
Gunnhild Øyehaug at Bergen Public Library

Gunnhild Øyehaug (born 9 January 1975, Volda Municipality, Norway) is a Norwegian poet, writer and lecturer.

== Literary career ==
She made her literary debut in 1998 with a collection of poems "Slaven av blåbæret" (t: Slave of the Blueberry).

Her second book, Knutar (t: Knots), a collection of short stories, proved very popular in 2004 and was nominated for the Brage Prize of the Norwegian Publisher's Association.

Øyehaug took her M.A. in Comparative Literature at the University of Bergen. She has been co-editor of "Vagant", the leading literary journal in Norway, and literary critic for the newspapers "Morgenbladet" and »Klassekampen«. She has taught literary theory at University of Bergen and has also worked to promote literature in various ways. She now also co-edits the literary journal "Kraftsentrum."

With film director, Yngvild Sve Flikke, she adapted Vente, blinke into a screenplay which was released as Kvinner i for store herreskjorter (t: Women in Oversized Men's Shirts) in 2015.

== Bibliography ==
- Slaven av blåbæret (Poetry, 1998)
- Knutar (Short stories, 2004) (English edition: Knots: Stories, translated by Kari Dickson, Farrar, Straus and Giroux, 2017)
- Stol og ekstase (Essays and short stories, 2006)
- Vente, blinke (Novel, 2008) (English edition: Wait Blink: A Perfect Picture of Inner Life, translated by Kari Dickson, Farrar, Straus and Giroux, 2018)
