= Skulpturstopp =

Norwegian public art organization

Skulpturstopp is a Norwegian public sculpture project initiated and operated by Sparebankstiftelsen DNB. The project operates by inviting artists to choose a location in Eastern Norway and then create a sculpture for the chosen site. Funding for the works is provided by Sparebankstiftelsen DnB.

== Collection ==
- Norwegian Wood Lattice Bisected By Curved 2-way-mirror (2010) by Dan Graham in Vågå Municipality
- FLOKK (2011) by Gitte Dæhlin in Sør-Fron Municipality
- Mothership with Standing Matter (2011) by Antony Gormley in Lillehammer Municipality
- Gripping (2014) by Richard Deacon in Gjøvik Municipality
- Allium (2014) by Sverre Wyller in Østre Toten Municipality
- HEAD N.N. (2014) by Marianne Heske in Oslo Municipality
- Mental Gene Bank (2016) by Per Inge Bjørlo in Dovre Municipality
- 14–7–2006 (2016) by Kirsten Ortwed in Moss Municipality
- Yes to all (2016) by Sylvie Fleury in Skedsmo Municipality
- In my faith, in my hope, in my love (2018) by Jaume Plensa in Fredrikstad Municipality
- The Gran Boathouse (2010) by Rachel Whiteread in Gran Municipality.
- Creature from Iddefjord (2020) by Martin Puryear in Oslo Municipality
- Broken Thrones (2020) by Camilla Løw in Ullensaker Municipality
