= Rasmus Andreas Torset =

Norwegian politician

Rasmus Andreas Torset (25 May 1897 - 9 December 1965) was a Norwegian politician for the Liberal Party.

He served as a deputy representative to the Norwegian Parliament from Møre og Romsdal during the term 1958–1961.
