= Knut Henry Haraldsen =

Norwegian footballer (born 1976)

Personal information
- Date of birth: 14 December 1976 (age 49)
- Place of birth: Kristiansand, Norway
- Height: 1.96 m (6 ft 5 in)
- Position: Defender

Youth career
- –1995: Start

Senior career*
Years	Team	Apps	(Gls)
1996	Start	17	(0)
1997–2002	Vålerenga	109	(4)
2001	→ Bryne (loan)	25	(1)
2003–2005	Westerlo		
2005–2008	Hamarkameratene	75	(3)
2009–2010	Start	17	(0)

International career
1997	Norway U21	4	(0)
1998	Norway U23	3	(0)
- * Club domestic league appearances and goals

Knut Henry Haraldsen (born 14 December 1976) is a retired Norwegian football defender.

He was drafted into the senior team of IK Start from its youth section in 1996. Already the next year he went to Vålerenga, where he played throughout 2002, except for a season-long loan to Bryne in 2001. Haraldsen, who also played for Norway U21 and was a squad member for the 1998 UEFA European Under-21 Championship, got a spell abroad in Belgian K.V.C. Westerlo from 2003 to 2005 before returning to Norway's Hamarkameratene and finally Start.
