= Vegard Sannes =

Norwegian footballer (born 1976)

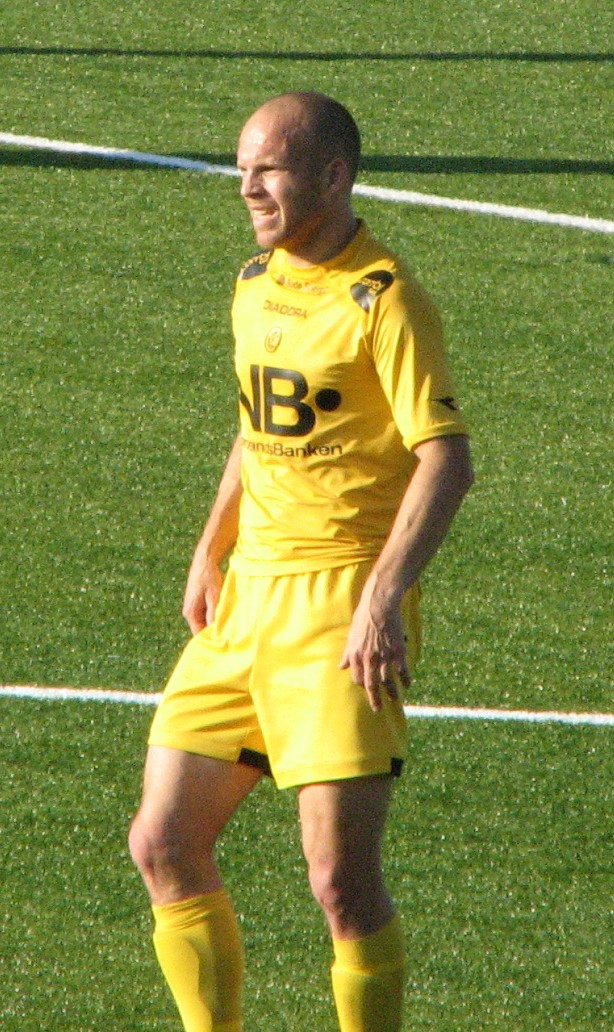

Personal information
- Date of birth: 4 September 1976 (age 50)
- Place of birth: Kirkenes, Norway
- Height: 1.76 m (5 ft 9 1/2 in)
- Position: Midfielder

Senior career*
Years	Team	Apps	(Gls)
- Kirkenes
–2000	Alta		
2001–2008	Bodø/Glimt	125	(5)
- * Club domestic league appearances and goals

Vegard Sannes (born 4 September 1976) is a retired Norwegian football midfielder who notably played for FK Bodø/Glimt.

He was born in Kirkenes, and started his career in Kirkenes IF. He then continued in Alta IF, before joining Bodø/Glimt ahead of the 2001 season. He played 87 games and scored 4 goals in the Norwegian Premier League over the following years, and stayed in Bodø/Glimt after their relegation 2005. The team was re-promoted ahead of the 2008 season.

However, he did not play a single game in the 2008 season due to a knee injury, and at the end of the season his contract with Bodø/Glimt was not renewed. He was interested in a return to Alta IF, but not with the current knee injury, and therefore he retired.

== Career statistics ==
As of 12 November 2014

Season	Club	Division	League		Cup		Total	
Season	Club	Division	Apps	Goals	Apps	Goals	Apps	Goals
2001	Bodø/Glimt	Tippeligaen	16	1	4	2	20	3
2002	Bodø/Glimt	Tippeligaen	22	1	4	3	26	4
2003	Bodø/Glimt	Tippeligaen	18	1	6	0	24	0
2004	Bodø/Glimt	Tippeligaen	22	0	4	0	26	0
2005	Bodø/Glimt	Tippeligaen	11	0	3	0	14	0
2006	Bodø/Glimt	Adeccoligaen	16	0	0	0	16	0
2007	Bodø/Glimt	Adeccoligaen	20	2	2	0	22	2
2008	Bodø/Glimt	Tippeligaen	0	0	0	0	0	0
Career Total			125	5	23	5	148	10
