= Sigurd Nørstebø =

Norwegian educationalist

Sigurd Bjarne Nørstebø (17 January 1905 – 6 May 1976) was a Norwegian educationalist.

Born in Lesja Municipality, he first graduated from Levanger Teachers' College in 1927. After working as a schoolteacher and studying further, he took the mag.art. degree in 1939 with a thesis on John Dewey.

He became a docent at the Norwegian College of Teaching in 1946 and was promoted to professor in 1953. He also served as rector of the Norwegian College of Teaching from 1953 to 1956, prorector from 1959 to 1962 and rector again from 1962 to 1963. He served at the NAVF council and was elected to the Royal Norwegian Society of Sciences and Letters. He died in May 1976.
