= Kine Elisabeth Steinsvik =

Norwegian judge

Kine Elisabeth Steinsvik (born 13 May 1976) is a Norwegian judge.

She was born in Sandnessjøen and finished the cand.jur. degree in 2001. After one year in the Ministry of Justice she was hired in the Office of the Attorney General of Norway in 2003. Apart from a tenure as acting judge in Eidsivating Court of Appeal in 2006–2007, she stayed at the Office of the Attorney General for eleven years.

In 2014 she became presiding judge in Borgarting Court of Appeal, and she was subsequently appointed as a Supreme Court Justice in 2019.
