= Ivar Heming Skre =

Norwegian resistance member

Ivar Heming Skre (22 March 1897 – 7 September 1943) was a member of the Norwegian resistance during World War II.

Skre was born in Borre. His mother came from Ås and his father from Bremanger. Much of his childhood was spent in Avaldsnes, where he attended a folk high school.

In 1920, Skre married Ingeborg Dalen from Haugesund. They began their life together in Bergen, where Skre found employment as an editor.

Together with his brother Finn Åsmund Skre, born 1904, Skre joined the Kristian Stein group during the occupation of Norway by Nazi Germany. They published and distributed illegal newspapers. Both were arrested in October 1941. Ivar Heming Skre was imprisoned from 9 October to 7 November 1941 in Bergen, then in Ulven concentration camp until 4 May 1942. He was transferred via Kiel to Halle concentration camp, where he was executed in September 1943.
