= Geir Halnes =

Norwegian poet (born 1976)

Geir Halnes (born 21 April 1976) is a Norwegian poet.

His debut collection Hils hvis du ser meg issued on Oktober (2007) was reviewed in VG, Adresseavisen, Dagbladet and Aftenposten. His sophomore Mor rom (Oktober, 2017) was reviewed in Dag og Tid.

At the time of releasing his first poetry collection, he was a research fellow at the Swedish University of Agricultural Sciences, later being hired at the Norwegian University of Life Sciences.
