= Ann Eli Tafjord =

Norwegian cross-country skier

Ann Eli Tafjord (born 1976) is a retired Norwegian cross-country skier.

She made her World Cup debut in March 2002 at the Holmenkollen ski festival, finishing 41st in the 30 km. She collected her first World Cup points with a 17th place in the March 2005 Lahti 10 km, and the next week finished 19th at the 2005 Holmenkollen ski festival. Her last World Cup outing was the 2006 Holmenkollen ski festival, where she finished 10th.

She represented the sports club Valldal IL.
