= Erling Larsson =

Norwegian politician

Erling Larsson (1 April 1905 – 17 December 1976) was a Norwegian politician for the Liberal Party.

He was born in Hjelmeland Municipality and attended Stord Teachers' College. After working as a teacher in Hjelmeland, he moved to Sauda Municipality in 1928. From 1949 to 1972 he was the director of education in Sauda municipality. He was also elected to the municipal council of Sauda Municipality from 1946 to 1967, serving three non-consecutive terms as mayor. He chaired Rogaland county council from 1963 to 1967.

He served as a deputy representative to the Parliament of Norway from Rogaland during the terms 1958–1961, 1961–1965 and 1965–1969. In total he met during 9 days of parliamentary session. His political issues included supporting Nynorsk and the temperance movement. When the Liberal Party split in 1972, Larsson aligned with the Liberal People's Party.

He was awarded the King's Medal of Merit in gold in 1976, but died in the same year.
