= Maren Hersleth Holsen =

Norwegian politician

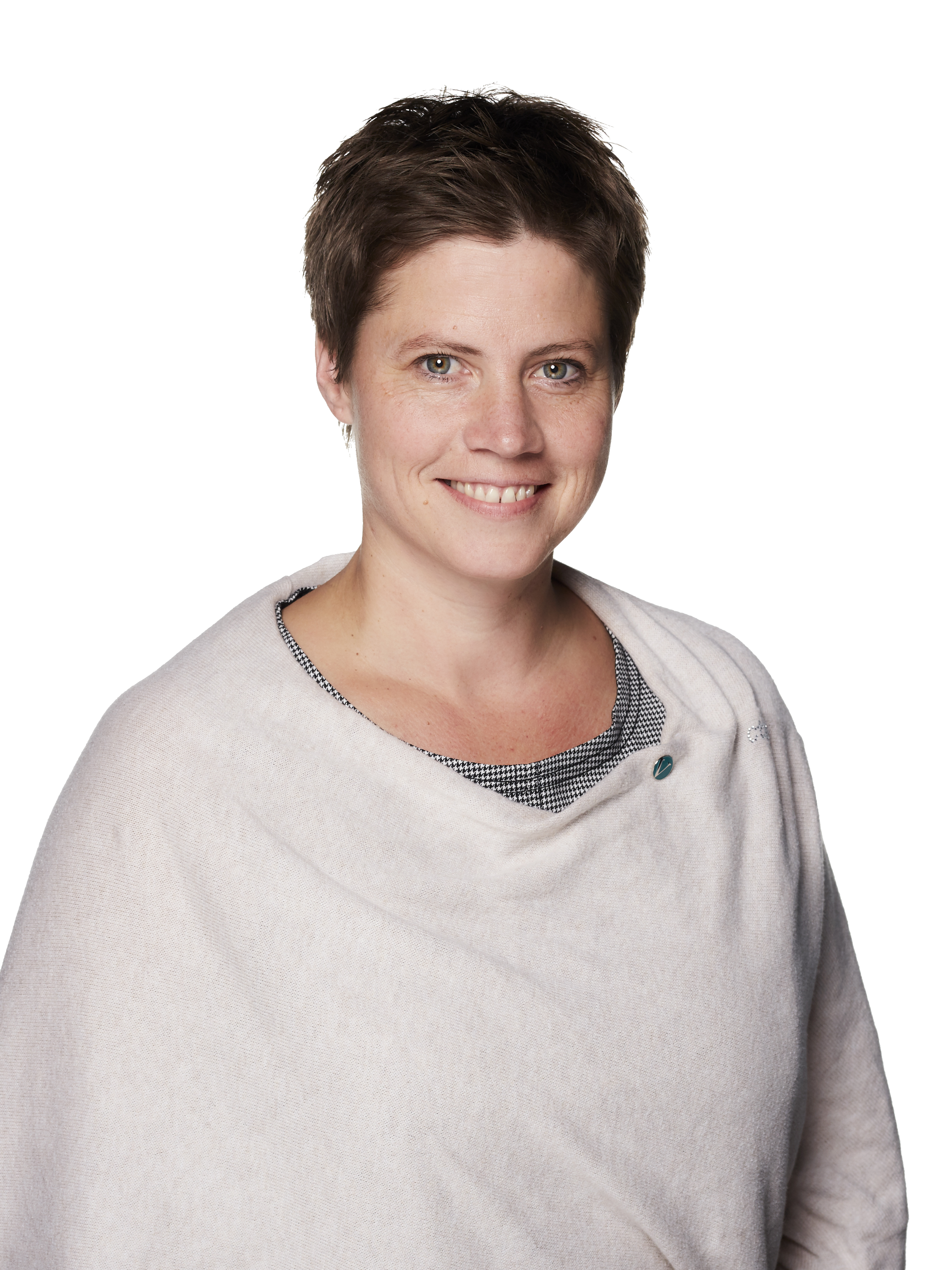

State Secretary in the Ministry of Climate and Environment
- In office 2020–2021
- Prime Minister: Erna Solberg

Deputy representative to the Parliament of Norway
- In office 2021–2025
- Constituency: Akershus

Personal details
- Born: 20 June 1976 (age 49)
- Party: Liberal Party

Maren Johanne Hersleth Holsen (born 20 June 1976) is a Norwegian politician for the Liberal Party.

She was a State Secretary in the Ministry of Climate and Environment from 2020 to 2021, serving in Solberg's Cabinet. She served as a deputy representative to the Parliament of Norway from Akershus during the term 2021–2025.

She is educated as a landscape architect, but became a mutton farmer in Hærland. Entering politics, she became deputy mayor of Eidsberg in 2011. She was a director of planning in Eidsberg municipality from 2015, and continued as a director when Eidsberg was merged into Indre Østfold municipality.
