= Erlend Kaasa =

Norwegian author (born 1976)

Erlend Kaasa (born 8 July 1976) is a Norwegian teacher, artist and novelist.

Publishing on Samlaget, he issued the novels Thunder Road (2009), Livius (2015) and Men ikkje Maria (2019), and the short story collection (44) (2025). Thunder Road was set in the 1990s and was reviewed in several newspapers. He hails from Vinje Municipality and resides in Indre Arna.
