= Herman Vogt =

Norwegian contemporary composer (born 1976)

Herman Vogt (born 9 March 1976 in Drammen) is a Norwegian contemporary composer.

Vogt studied composition at the Norwegian Academy of Music under the tutorship of Lasse Thoresen, Olav Anton Thommessen, Henrik Hellstenius and Bjørn Kruse. He has also studied at the Royal Conservatory of The Hague with Martijn Padding and Louis Andriessen. In 2018 he took a Master's degree in composition at the Norwegian Academy of Music in Oslo under the tuition of Asbjørn Schaathun. From 1995 to 1997, Vogt studied violin at the Norwegian Academy of Music in Oslo. Vogt has also completed individual mentoring sessions and masterclasses with composers such as Salvatore Sciarrino, Walter Zimmermann, Helmut Lachenmann, Brian Ferneyhough, Kaija Saariaho, Manos Tsangaris, Manfred Stahnke, Frédéric Durieux, Klas Thorstensson and Diana Burrell.

Vogt’s works has seen performances by such ensembles, orchestras and performers as the Oslo Philharmonic Orchestra, Norwegian Radio Orchestra, Trondheim Symphony Orchestra, Oslo Sinfonietta, BIT20 Ensemble, Poing, Geir Inge Lotsberg, Ian Pace, Kristian Lindberg, Rolf Borch, Audun Sandvik, Sveinung Bjelland and Anders Eidsten Dahl, as well as conductors Vasily Petrenko, Edward Gardner, Pierre-André Valade, Christian Eggen, Per Kristian Skalstad, Peter Szilvay, and Baldur Brönniman. His works have been featured at festivals Ultima Oslo Contemporary Music Festival, Nordic Music Days, Oslo Chamber Music Festival, the Borealis Festival in Bergen, Johan Halvorsen Music Fest, Valdres Sommersymfoni and the UNM Festival. Internationally, his works have been featured by the Athelas Sinfonietta in Copenhagen, Ensemble UNKO in Helsinki and at the 2010 and 2012 ISCM World Music Days.

== Production ==
=== Selected works ===
- I Wandered Lonely as a Cloud (2026), for cello and piano, commissioned by Gloppen musikkfest
- Rossetti Songs (2026), for soprano and organ, commissioned by Ann-Helen Moen and Anders E. Dahl
- Let My Future Radiant Shine (2025), for Choir and Orchestra, commissioned by Oslo Philharmonic Orchestra
- String Quartet No. 2 (2024), commissioned by Hardanger musikkfest for Opus13
- Sinfonia, for string orchestra (2024), commissioned by Barratt Due Institute of Music
- Recorder Concerto, for Alto Recorder and string orchestra (2024), commissioned by Caroline Eidsten Dahl
- Graves Songs, for soprano and string orchestra (2023), commissioned by Telemark kammerorkester
- Cello Concerto, for cello and orchestra (2012-2022), commissioned by Audun Sandvik
- Piano Concerto, for piano and orchestra (2017-2021)
- Vinterblommer (english title: Winter Flowers), for alto voice/countertenor and chamber ensemble (2021), commissioned by Bragernes Barokk
- Lux Manifesta, for orchestra (2021)
- Light Shall Shine Out of Darkness, version for organ (2020), commissioned by Anders Eidsten Dahl
- Den annen sang - Variations on 'Herre Gud, ditt dyre navn og ære', for alto voice and string orchestra (2020), commissioned by Ter Jung Ensemble
- Laudato Si, for alto voice/countertenor and chamber ensemble (2019), commissioned by Daniel Sagstuen Sæther
- Solsangen (Eng. title: Canticle of the Sun), for orchestra (2018), commissioned by the Oslo Philharmonic Orchestra
- String Quartet No. 1 (2017)
- Three Spheres, chamber ensemble (2017)
- Ré-sur-Ré...exit, for solo organ (2016), commissioned by Anders Eidsten Dahl
- Violin Concerto, for violin and orchestra (2012/2015), commissioned by Geir Inge Lotsberg
- The Marvel of Turin, for solo organ (2012), commissioned by Anders Eidsten Dahl
- Sonata in D, for violin and piano (2012/2017), commissioned by Bjarne Magnus Jensen
- Concordia Discors, Etudes nos. 1-11 for Solo Piano (2006–2015), commissioned by Magnus Loddgard, Ingfrid Breie Nyhus, Kristain Lindberg and Ian Pace
- Piano Trio (2006), commissioned by Johan Halvorsen Musikkfest
- Danksagung an den Bach, for soprano and ensemble (2004), commissioned by Ante Skaug
- Kazbek, for orchestra (2002), commissioned by Per Kristian Skalstad

=== Discography ===
- Herman Vogt: Lux Manifesta, containing two works (Lux Manifesta and Canticle of the Sun) with Oslo Philharmonic and Aivis Greters, LAWO Classics 2026
- Herman Vogt: Vinterblommer, English title Winter Flowers, to poems by Henrik Wergeland, for Alto voice and chamber ensemble, with Daniel Saether, Bragernes Barokk, LAWO Classics 2025
- Herman Vogt: Cello Concerto and Piano Concerto, with Audun Sandvik, Sveinung Bjelland, Anna-Maria Helsing & the Norwegian Radio Orchestra - LAWO Classics 2024
- Herman Vogt: Laudato Si, with Bragernes Barokk - LAWO Classics 2022
- Herman Vogt: Light Shall Shine Out of Darkness, (organ version), Ré-sur-Ré...exit, The Marvel of Turin, with Anders Eidsten Dahl - LAWO Classics 2022
- Herman Vogt: Den annen sang, TERJUNGENSEMBLE - Fabra 2021
- Herman Vogt: Violin Concerto, with Geir Inge Lotsberg, Bjarte Engeset & the Norwegian Radio Orchestra - Afontibus 2016
