= Ole E. Nilsedalen =

Norwegian politician

Ole E. Nilsedalen (26 April 1905 – 18 December 1976) was a Norwegian politician for the Labour Party.

He was born in Ådal as a son of smallholders. He had no secondary education, and worked as a forestry labourer and as a barnkeeper. In 1934 he became leader of Ådal Labour Party.

Nilsedalen was a member of Ådal municipal council from 1928 through 1964, when the municipality was merged to Ringerike municipality. Having been Ådal's mayor in 1940–1941 and 1945–1964, he also served as Ringerike's mayor from 1964 to 1971, when he finally left local politics. Nilsedalen also chaired Buskerud county council from 1953 to 1963. He served as a deputy representative to the Parliament of Norway from Buskerud during the terms 1945–1949 and 1961–1965. In total he met during 1 year and 331 days of parliamentary session.

Concurrent with his eleven last years as mayor, Nilsedalen chaired the Norwegian Association of Rural Municipalities. Upon stepping down in 1971, he was awarded the King's Medal of Merit in gold.
