= Camilla Løw =

Norwegian artist

Camilla Løw (born 1976) is a contemporary Norwegian artist. She graduated from Asker Kunstskole in Norway in 1998. After this, she left for Glasgow, where she graduated from the Glasgow School of Art in 2001 with a BA in Fine Art.

== Exhibitions ==
- 2008 Straight Letters, Pier Arts Centre, Orkney
- 2008 Straight Letters, Dundee Contemporary Arts, Dundee
- 2008 Embraced Open Reassembled, Sutton Lane, London
- 2008 New Ruins, Bergen Kunsthall No.5
- 2010 Culture & Leisure, New Art Centre, Roche Court, Salisbury
- 2012 The Space of Shape-Time, The National Museum of Art, Architecture and Design, Oslo
- 2013 Camilla Løw:One Night Only, UKS, Oslo
- 2016 Eye in the Sky, Kunstnerforbundet, Oslo

== Residencies ==
- 2010 Colab Art & Architecture, Bangalore - Office for Contemporary Art, Oslo.
- 2002 Sirius Art Centre, Cobh, Cork,

== Collections ==
- The National Museum of Art, Architecture and Design, Norway,
- The British Arts Council Collection, UK
- The Government Art Collection, UK
- The Piers Art Collection, Orkney
- Region Skåne, Sweden
- The Ruppert Collection of post-1945 Concrete Art Museum in Kultuspeicher, Wurzberg, Germany
- The Statoil Art Collection, Norway
- The Storebrand Art Collection, Norway
- Broken Thrones funded by Skulpturstopp.
