= Gunnar Nygaard (broadcaster) =

Norwegian broadcaster

Gunnar Nygaard (24 December 1897 – 25 January 1997) was a Norwegian broadcasting pioneer. He was born in Kristiania. He was educated in telegraphy, and a pioneer in the technical development of broadcasting in Norway. He took part in the first experimental broadcasting from Tryvasshøgda, starting in 1923. From 1933 he worked for the Norwegian Broadcasting Corporation. During the German occupation of Norway Nygaard established and operated a Norwegian short-wave transmitter in the United States, in particular targeting Norwegian sailors. Back in Norway he established a short-wave radio for seamen, which opened in Fredrikstad in 1948. He was awarded the St. Olav Medal in 1964.
