= Sigmund Hagen =

Norwegian politician

Sigmund Hagen (born 15 August 1976) is a Norwegian politician for the Socialist Left Party.

He served as a deputy representative to the Norwegian Parliament from Oppland during the term 2001–2005. In total he met during 6 days of parliamentary session.
