= Dag Haug =

Norwegian linguist (born 1976)

- Born: Dag Trygve Truslew Haug; April 17, 1976 (age 50); Neuilly-sur-Seine, France.
- Awards: Nils Klim Prize (2005)

Academic background
- Education: University of Oslo (MA, PhD)
- Thesis: Les phases de l’évolution de la langue épique (2001)
- Doctoral advisors: Nils Berg; Charles de Lamberterie

Academic work
- Discipline: Linguistics, Digital Humanities
- Institutions: University of Oslo

Dag Trygve Truslew Haug (born April 17, 1976) is a Norwegian linguist and professor of linguistics and classics at the University of Oslo.

== Career ==
Dag Haug attended a French high school before he began studying at the University of Oslo, and he received his master's degree in 1996. He majored in Greek in 1998 and was then a research fellow. In 2001 he received his doctorate with a thesis on the language of the Iliad.

Between 2003 and 2005 he was an Alexander von Humboldt postdoctoral fellow at the University of Freiburg. Since then, he has been at the University of Oslo, first as a postdoctoral fellow (2003–2005), then as an associate professor of Latin (2005-2012), professor of classics (Greek and Latin) (2012–present), and professor of linguistics (2018–present).

Haug has worked extensively on lexicalist syntax (lexical functional grammar and dependency grammar), formal semantics, and historical linguistics, as well as on developing computational and corpus linguistic methods and resources. He was the head of the PROIEL (Pragmatic Resources in Old Indo-European Languages) project and he is currently the director of the Centre for Digital Development at the Humanities Faculty (Humit) at the University of Oslo.

== Distinctions ==
Haug received the Norwegian Royal Gold Medal for young researchers in 2002 for his dissertation and won the Nils Klim Prize in 2005.
