= Tom Kristoffersen =

Norwegian footballer (born 1976)

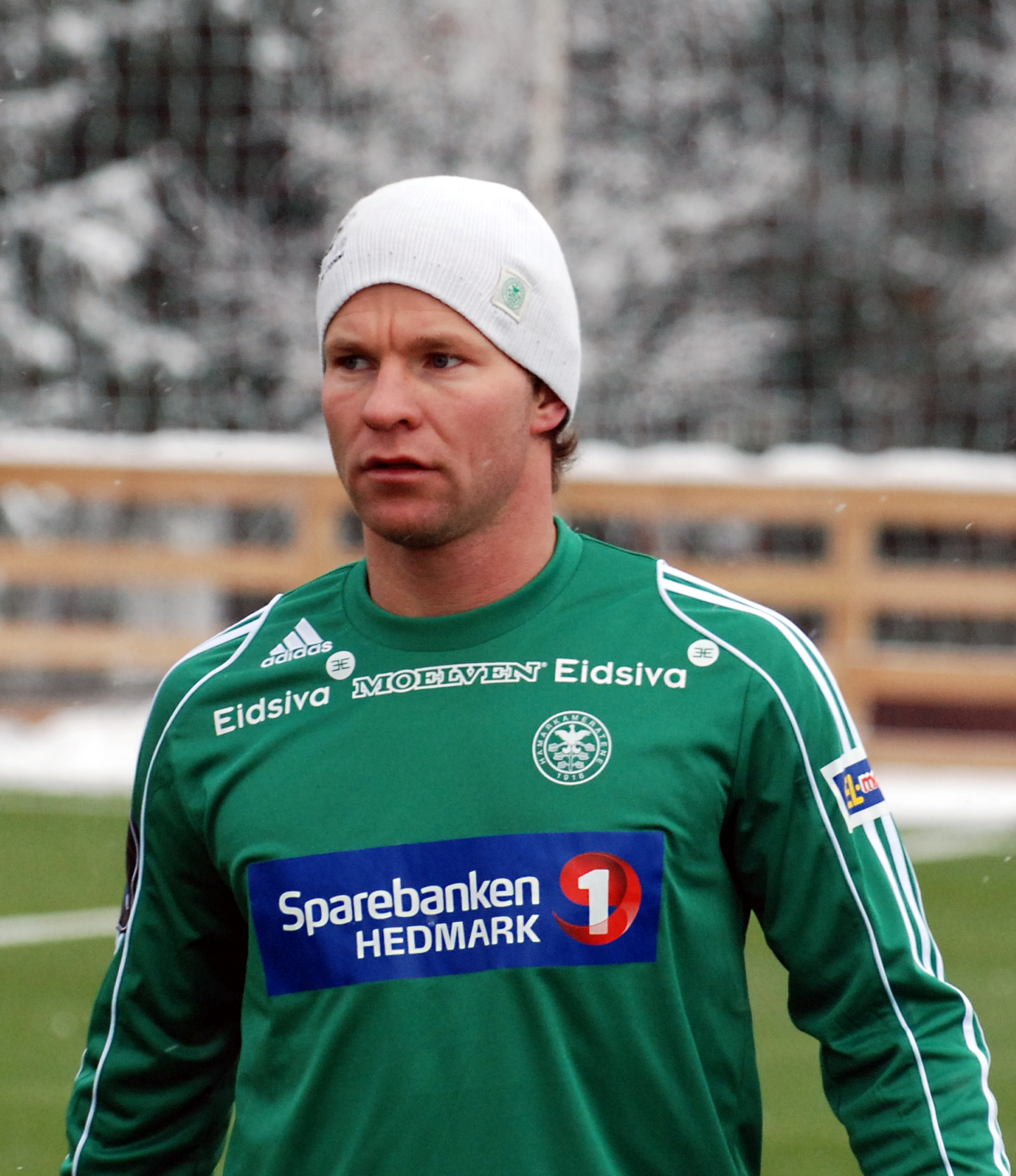
- Tom Kristoffersen, HamKam - Notodden, HIAS-banen in Stange, Hedmark, Norway

Personal information
- Full name: Tom Vermelid Kristoffersen
- Date of birth: 15 October 1976 (age 50)
- Height: 1.74 m (5 ft 9 in)
- Position: Defender

Senior career*
Years	Team	Apps	(Gls)
1999–2000	Eidsvold Turn		
2001–2004	Lillestrøm	50	(3)
2005–2006	Sandefjord	53	(0)
2007	Eidsvold Turn		
2007–2009	Hamarkameratene	29	(0)
2010–2011	Strømmen	44	(0)
2012	Ull/Kisa	24	(2)
2012	Lyn	11	(1)
2014	Strømmen	6	(0)
2016–2017	Fremad Famagusta	5	(3)
- * Club domestic league appearances and goals

Tom Vermelid Kristoffersen (born 15 October 1976) is a retired Norwegian football defender.

He came through Eidsvold Turn and played Eliteserien football for Lillestrøm, Sandefjord and Hamarkameratene.
