= Syvert Tobiassen Messel =

Norwegian politician

Syvert Tobiassen Messel (22 July 1897 – 3 July 1978) was a Norwegian politician for the Liberal Party.

He was elected to the Norwegian Parliament from Vest-Agder in 1950, but was not re-elected in 1954.

Messel was born in Oddernes and was involved in local politics in Oddernes and its successor municipality Kristiansand, as well as Vest-Agder county council. He was deputy mayor of Oddernes from 1934 to 1945 and mayor from 1945 to 1964.
