= Stian Johansen =

Norwegian author (born 1976)

Stian Johansen (born 21 April 1976) is a Norwegian author.

He hails from Skien and first issued on minor publishing houses. His Dikt om Odd came out on Det stille Forlaget in 2011. He was then contracted by Aschehoug and issued the poetry collections Jeff Tweedy, liksom (2014) and Feltet. I knehasene til Skien og Porsgrunn siden 1981 (2015), the novel Norge og døden (2018) and the short story collection Skilsmissedalen (2021).
