= Solveig Schytz =

Norwegian politician

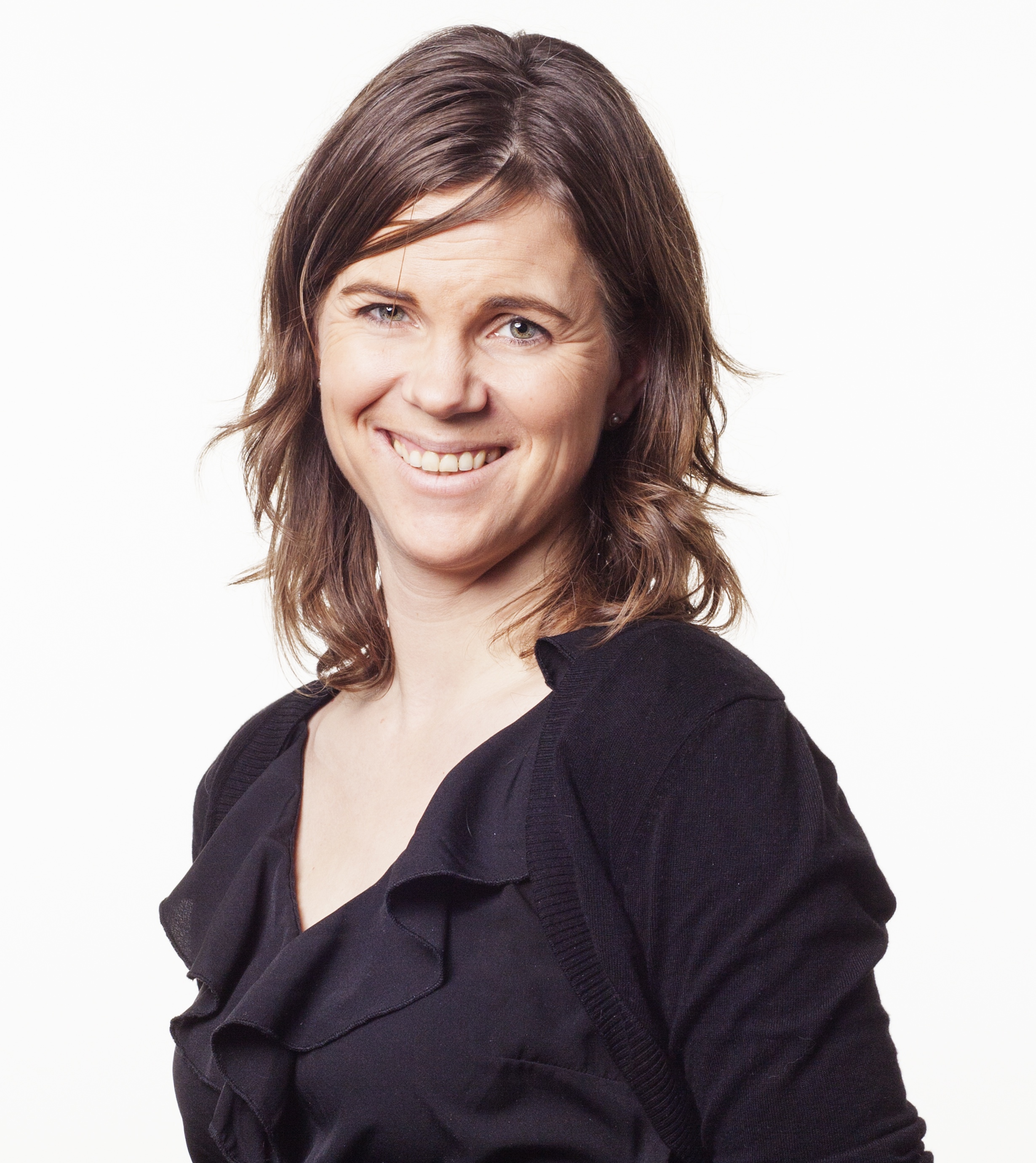

Akershus County Commissioner for Planning, Cultural Heritage, Climate and the Environment
- Incumbent
- Assumed office 17 October 2023
- Cabinet Chair: Anette Solli
- Preceded by: Position established

Deputy Member of the Storting
- Incumbent
- Assumed office 1 October 2013
- Deputising for: Abid Raja (2020–2021)
- Constituency: Akershus

Personal details
- Born: 19 February 1976 (age 49)
- Political party: Liberal

Solveig Schytz (born 19 February 1976) is a Norwegian politician for the Liberal Party. She has served as deputy member of parliament for Akershus since 2013. She has also served as the Akershus county commissioner for planning, cultural heritage, climate and the environment since 2023.

== Political career ==
=== Parliament ===
Schytz was elected as a deputy member for Akershus at the 2013 election. She was re-elected in 2017 and 2021. She deputised for Abid Raja when he served as minister of culture in Erna Solberg's government between January 2020 and October 2021.

In parliament, she sat on the Standing Committee on Justice between January and November 2020, before moving to the Standing Committee on Education and Research, where she throughout the remainder of the parliamentary term. Between October 2020 and October 2021 she also served as the party's deputy whip.

In 2021, Solveig Schytz proposed the World Organization of the Scout Movement (WOSM) and the World Association of Girl Guides and Girl Scouts (WAGGGS) for the Nobel Peace Prize.

=== Local politics ===
Following the 2023 Norwegian local elections, the Liberal Party managed to form a county cabinet together with its coalition partners, led by Anette Solli. The county cabinet would preside over Akershus County Municipality, following the dissolution of Viken on 1 January 2024. Schytz was selected as county commissioner of planning, cultural artefacts, climate and the environment.

== Personal life ==
She hails from Molde Municipality.

Political offices
New office	Akershus County Commissioner of Planning, Cultural Heritage, Climate and the Environment; 2023–present	Incumbent
Party political offices
Preceded by Ketil Kjenseth	Liberal Party Deputy Whip; 2020–2021	Succeeded by Grunde Almeland
