= Rolf Kiær =

Norwegian hydrographer

Rolf Kiær (17 June 1897 – 1975) is a Norwegian hydrographer.

He was born in Trondhjem. He was hired in the Norwegian Hydrographic Service in 1920, and in Norges Svalbard- og Ishavsundersøkelser in 1929. Here, he took part in expeditions to Svalbard and Eastern Greenland. From 1936 to 1967 he was the director of the Norwegian Hydrographic Service.
