= Ivar Werner Oftedal =

Norwegian mineralogist

Ivar Werner Oftedal (25 February 1894 – 30 May 1976) was a Norwegian mineralogist.

He was born in Larvik. He took his cand.real. degree in 1929 and the dr.philos. degree in 1941, both at the University of Oslo. After 29 years as a conservator at the University Museum, he was a professor of geology at the University of Oslo from 1949 to 1964, specializing in mineralogy, geochemistry and crystallography.
