= Rolf Rode Koren =

Norwegian politician

Rolf Rode Koren (27 December 1890 – 28 March 1976) was a Norwegian politician for the Conservative Party.

He was born in Fredrikstad and spent most of his career in De-No-Fa. He was a member of Fredrikstad city council for 30 years and chaired Østfold Conservative Party. He served as a deputy representative to the Parliament of Norway from Market towns of Østfold and Akershus counties during the terms 1945–1949 and 1940–1953. In total he met during 21 days of parliamentary session.
