= Skaret Pass =

Mountain pass of Queen Maud Land

Coordinates: 72°32′S 0°23′E

Skaret Pass is a mountain pass at the east side of Skarsnuten Peak in the Roots Heights, Sverdrup Mountains, in Queen Maud Land. Photographed from the air by the German Antarctic Expedition (1938–39). Mapped by Norwegian cartographers from surveys and air photos by Norwegian-British-Swedish Antarctic Expedition (NBSAE) (1949–52) and air photos by the Norwegian expedition (1958–59) and named Skaret (the gap).
