= Joronn Sitje =

Norwegian painter and illustrator

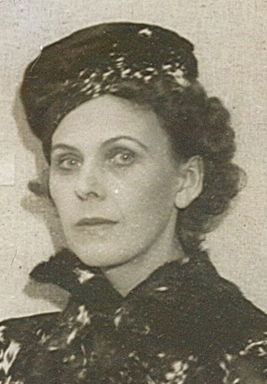
- Born: 30 April 1897; Kristiania, Norway
- Died: 18 December 1982 (aged 85); Oslo
- Education: Norwegian National Academy of Craft and Art Industry
- Occupations: Painter and illustrator
- Relatives: Otto Lous Mohr (brother-in-law); Hugo Lous Mohr (brother-in-law)

Joronn Sitje (30 April 1897 – 18 December 1982) was a Norwegian painter. She is known for her expressionistic paintings in the 1920s, and for her motives from Africa in the 1930s.

== Personal life ==
Sitje was born in Kristiania on 30 April 1897, a daughter of stipendiary magistrate Olaf Halvorsen Sitje and Hanna Dybdahl Dorff.

She married twice, first to Gunnar Gundersen (from 2024 to 2027), and second to writer and farmer Fridtjof Georg Lous Mohr (from 1928), a brother of Otto Lous Mohr and Hugo Lous Mohr. Her second husband died in 1942.

She had a daughter.

== Career ==
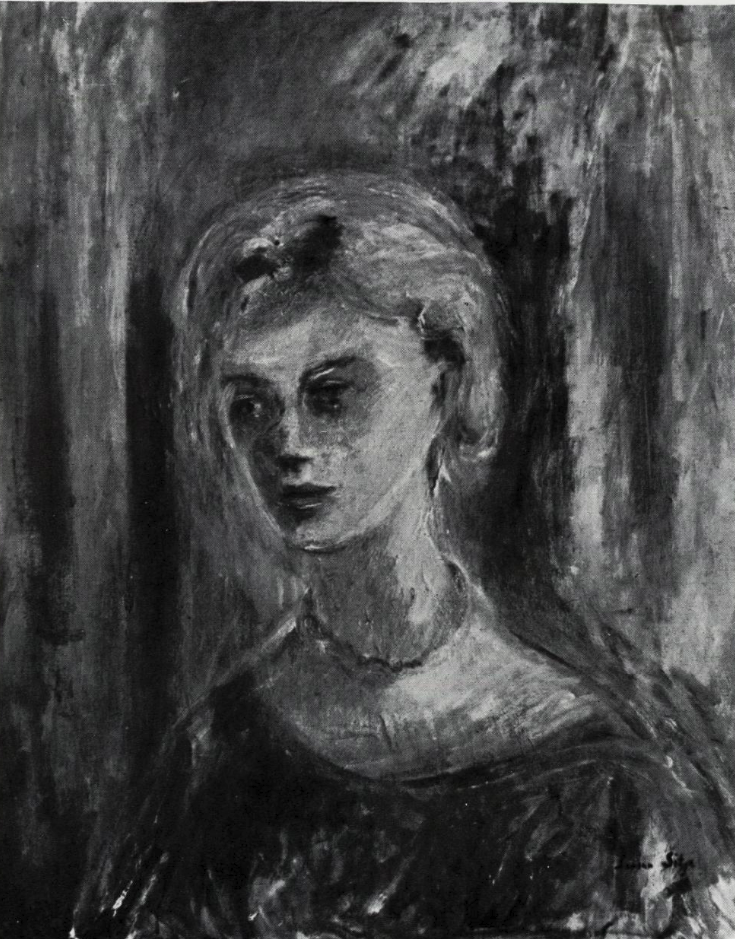
Self portrait (1926)

Sitje studied at the Norwegian National Academy of Craft and Art Industry under Oluf Wold-Torne and Lars Utne from 1914, but had to end these studies due to illness. She later spent a few years in Paris, where she was part of the Scandinavian art community. In Paris she received education from the French Fauvist Othon Friesz, and studied anatomy with the Swedish artist Sigfrid Ullman.

She had her artistic breakthrough in 1923, after a separate exhibition in Oslo. At this time she mostly painted religious and visionary motives, often in neoclassic style. Inspired by Henrik Sørensen, she eventually developed a more expressionistic style.

Along with her second husband she settled as farmer in Kenya between 1928 and 1939. During this period her paintings were inspired by African nature and people. She illustrated two books written by her husband, På afrikanske vidder. Jakt og fiske under ekvator (1932), and Farmen ved elven (1933).

After the death of her husband in 1942, she lived in the village of Høn in Asker until 1972, where she mostly painted landscapes, interiors and portraits, often of her daughter Franciska, nicknamed "Bitte".

She is represented at the National Museum of Norway with four of her paintings from Kenya. including Chepsergon from 1930.

Sitje died in Oslo on 18 December 1982.
