= Håkon Hoff =

Norwegian newspaper editor and politician

Håkon Hoff (15 May 1898 – 4 July 1976) was a Norwegian newspaper editor and politician for the Labour Party.

He was born in Orkanger as a son of a builder. He joined the Labour Party in 1913, chaired the local branch of Norges Socialdemokratiske Ungdomsforbund and was a board member of the regional Labour Party branch from 1919 to 1921. He worked as a laborer until 1923, first at a sawmill, then as a carpenter. He was also a member of the Orkanger school board in 1923, before moving away from the district. In 1924 he was hired as a journalist in Arbeiderbladet. He edited the newspapers Sørlandet from 1925 to 1931; Halden Arbeiderblad from 1931 to 1935; Hamar Arbeiderblad from 1935 to 1941; and Vestfold Arbeiderblad (renamed Vestfold) from 1950 to 1968, where he succeeded Sverre Hjertholm. He chaired Vest-Agder Labour Party in 1929 and was a board member of the Kristiansand Labour Party from 1928 to 1931.

Hoff participated in the Left Communist Youth League's military strike action of 1924 by agitating for it through Arbeiderbladet, and for which he was sentenced to 75 days in prison. In 1961 he was fined 500 kr for libel, and two articles in his newspaper Vestfold Arbeiderblad were declared null and void. He died in July 1976 and was buried at Vestre gravlund.
