= Ole Andreas Nilsen =

Norwegian footballer (born 1976)

Ole Andreas Nilsen (born 15 March 1976), is a Norwegian footballer.

He hails from Tromsø and played as a right back for Tromsø IL from 1995 to 2006 season, and moved to the senior team from Tromsø's junior team. Nilsen played 163 league games for the club, and scored seven league goals. He is educated as a physiotherapist.
