= Håvard Homstvedt =

Norwegian artist

Håvard Homstvedt (in English: Haavard Homstvedt) (1976) is a Norwegian artist.

== Life and work ==
Homstvedt was in born Lørenskog, Norway, and is currently based in New York and Oslo.

Educated in Norway, the US, and Italy (Rome), as part of the European Honors Program (EHP) at Rhode Island School of Design (RISD). Homstvedt graduated with BFA from RISD in 2000 and an MFA from Yale University School of Art in 2003.

While Homstvedt's main focus is with painting, he also works in various other media, including printmaking, sculpture, and installation. Characteristic for Homstvedt's paintings is a heightened focus on the materiality and surface of the work. His work is present in a number of important private collections and museums in North America and Europe.

Recent solo exhibitions include Galleri Riis, Oslo and Stockholm (2012, 2009–10, and 2007–2008), Galerie Anne de Villepoix, Paris (2011), Focus, VIP art fair (2011), Annarumma, Napoli (2010–11), Art Unlimited at Art Basel 40 (2009), Art 39 Basel Statements (2008) and Perry Rubenstein Gallery, NY (2008). A large neon sculpture titled You Will Hardly Know was included in the seminal exhibition Lights On at Astrup Fearnley Museet, Oslo, 2008 . The first publication on Homstvedt, You Will Hardly Know, was published by Galleri Riis in 2008. The following book titled Ripple Sole was published by Galleri Riis, and launched at Art Basel 42 in June 2011.

Håvard Homstvedt is represented by Galleri Riis, Oslo and Stockholm www.galleririis.com and Anne de Villepoix, Paris www.annedevillepoix.com.
