= Kim Larsen (footballer) =

Norwegian footballer (born 1976)

Personal information
- Date of birth: 7 September 1976 (age 50)
- Place of birth: Oslo, Norway
- Height: 1.82 m (5 ft 11 1/2 in)
- Position: Forward

Senior career*
Years	Team	Apps	(Gls)
1995–1997	Skeid	35	(1)
1999	Lørenskog	42	(34)
2000–2002	Odd Grenland	59	(21)
2002	→Raufoss IL (Loan)	8	(2)
2003–2004	Strømsgodset IF	43	(15)
2005	Tromsø IL	5	(0)
2005–2006	Herfølge BK	24	(8)
2006	Kalmar FF	9	(1)
2007	Skeid	21	(3)
2008	FK Tønsberg	25	(20)
2009–2010	Manglerud Star	45	(15)
- * Club domestic league appearances and goals as of 25 August 2012

Kim Larsen is a Norwegian football forward who last played for Manglerud Star.

During his professional career Larsen played for Skeid, Odd Grenland and Tromsø in Tippeligaen, Kalmar FF in Allsvenskan and Herfølge in the Danish 1st Division. Larsen also played for several clubs in the lower divisions in Norway.
