= Rolf Aakervik =

Norwegian editor and politician

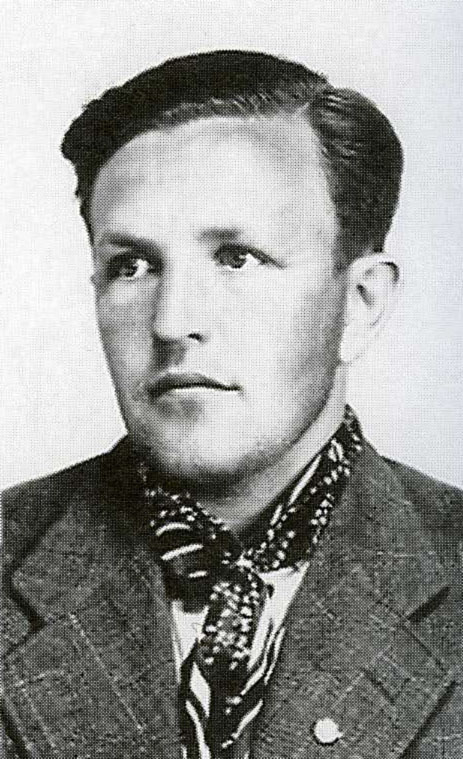
Image of Rolf Aakervik

Rolf Aakervik (11 May 1915 – 15 January 1976) was a Norwegian editor and politician for the Labour Party.

He was born in Trondhjem, but moved with his family to Torshov at the age of 5. He joined the labour movement and founded a Torshov chapter of the Workers' Youth League in 1933. He worked delivery and office jobs in Arbeiderbladet, Tiden Norsk Forlag and Workers' Youth League. He chaired the Oslo and Akershus regional branch of the Workers' Youth League in 1940.

During the German occupation of Norway he was arrested twice. First, he was held at Åkebergveien prison. The second time, he was arrested for his involvement in the illegal newspaper Fri Fagbevegelse. He was held at Møllergata 19 from 6 March, then Grini concentration camp from 31 March 1942. On 20 March 1943 he was transported to Sachsenhausen concentration camp, where he remained until the prison camp was liberated.

In 1945 he was hired as a journalist in 1ste Mai, and travelled extensively to re-established the local chapters of the Workers' Youth League, which had been banned during the German occupation. From 1946 to 1949 he chaired the Workers' Youth League nationwide.

From 1949 to 1951 he was a journalist in Arbeiderbladet, and from 1951 to his death he was the editor-in-chief for the Norwegian Union of Building Industry Workers's magazine Bygningsarbeideren. Aakervik also chaired Oslo Arbeidersamfunn from 1949 to 1950 and Oslo Labour Party from 1966 to 1969. He chaired the supervisory council of OBOS and was deputy chair of Biblioteksentralen.

He was the father of Anne Aakervik.
