= Stian Thomassen =

Norwegian footballer

Personal information
- Date of birth: 8 August 1976 (age 50)
- Position: Defender

Youth career
- –1995: Lillestrøm

Senior career*
Years	Team	Apps	(Gls)
1996–1999	Lillestrøm	27	(0)
1998	→ Haugesund (loan)	16	(0)
2000–2002	HamKam	48	(0)
2003–2006	Nybergsund		
2007	Ull/Kisa		

International career
1994	Norway u-18	7	(0)
1995	Norway u-19	8	(0)
1996–1997	Norway u-21	12	(0)
- * Club domestic league appearances and goals

Stian Thomassen (born 8 August 1977) is a retired Norwegian football defender.

He came through the youth ranks of Lillestrøm SK and was drafted into the first team in 1996. He also represented Norway as a youth and under-21 international. Playing 27 Lillestrøm league games over three seasons, he spent 1998 on loan to FK Haugesund. He left the top tier to play three seasons for HamKam, four for Nybergsund and one for Ull/Kisa. He played a game on trial for Grimsby in 2001 during their preseason in Sweden.
