= Espen Dietrichson =

Norwegian artist

Espen Dietrichson (born 17 September 1976 in Stavanger, Norway) is a Norwegian artist. He lives and works in Oslo, Norway.

Dietrichson was educated at Oslo National Academy of the Arts (2000–2004). He is working mainly within the field of sculpture.

== Exhibitions ==
Espen Dietrichson has had several solo exhibitions: Gallery Van Bau, Vestfossen (2006), Kunstnerforbundet, Oslo (2007), Bomuldsfabriken Kunsthall, Arendal, (2007), Unge Kunstneres Samfunn, Oslo (2008), Galleri Trafo, Asker (2009), Galerie Susan Nielsen, Paris (2010)
