= Thora Grahl-Nielsen =

Norwegian politician

Thora Signe Grahl-Nielsen
- Born: 29 June 1901
- Died: 19 April 1976 (aged 74)
- Occupation: Norwegian politician

Thora Grahl-Nielsen (29 June 1901 – 19 April 1976) was a Norwegian politician for the Conservative Party.

She served as a deputy representative to the Parliament of Norway from Bergen during the terms 1950–1953, 1954–1957 and 1958–1961. In total she met during 39 days of parliamentary session.
