= Knut Bengtson =

Norwegian sailor

Knut Bengtson (3 June 1919 – 7 May 1976) was a Norwegian sailor who competed in the 1948 Summer Olympics and in the 1964 Summer Olympics.
