= Hilde Anita Nyvoll =

Norwegian politician (born 1976)

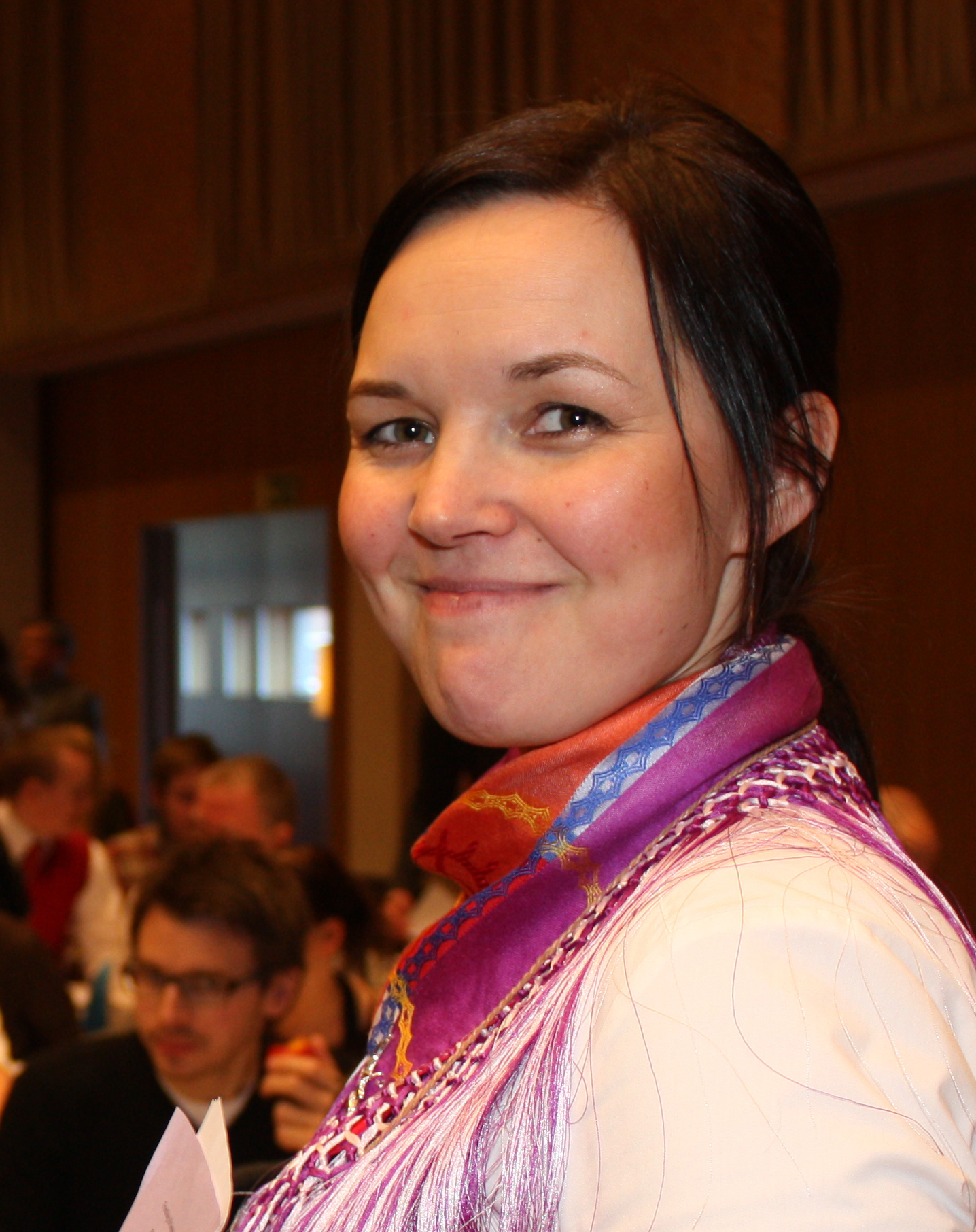
Hilde Anita Nyvoll, 2010.

Hilde Anita Nyvoll (born 29 May 1976) is a Norwegian politician for the Labour Party.

She hails from Oksfjordhamn. She was a member of the Sami Parliament from 2005 to 2013. She was elected as a deputy representative to the Parliament of Norway from Troms for the terms 2009–2013 and 2017–2021. In total she met during 33 days of parliamentary session. In the 2019 Norwegian local election she was elected as mayor of Nordreisa, and also won re-election in 2023.
