= Kristin Gjelsvik =

Norwegian blogger and YouTuber (born 1986)

Kristin Elisabeth Linde Gjelsvik (born 22 August 1986) is a Norwegian blogger and YouTuber.

== Biography ==
Born and raised in Bergen, Gjelsvik became known throughout Norway in 2012 when she participated in Paradise Hotel. After that, she continued in the spotlight as an influencer and founded a clothing brand which would later go bankrupt. Gjelsvik later went on to participate in more reality shows, such as Robinsonekspedisjonen, Bloggerne, and Camp Kulinaris. She has also issued the book #branok (English: #goodenough). As an influencer, Gjelsvik is known, among other things, for her staunch opposition to plastic surgery.

While filming Paradise Hotel Norge in 2012, Gjelsvik began dating Dennis Poppe Thorsen, a fellow social media influencer. The couple married in 2015, and resided in the Grünerløkka borough of Oslo with their son Falk, who was born in 2019. They bought a house at Austad in Drammen Municipality in 2020, but they broke up in 2022. Gjelsvik subsequently moved to Bærum Municipality.
