= Andreas Eriksen =

Norwegian novelist (1915–1976)

Andreas Eriksen (22 September 1915 – 17 August 1976) was a Norwegian novelist.

He was born in Kristiania. His debut novel was the boy's book Fire gutter drar nordover (1935). The novels Etterpå gikk vi hjem (1936) and Promenade (1937), followed; both about school or student life. In 1941 he released the short story collection Utkant. During the occupation of Norway by Nazi Germany he was arrested in January 1944. He was imprisoned in Bredtveit concentration camp until February, Grini concentration camp until July, then Berg concentration camp until 20 October 1944.
