= Olav Kristian Strømme =

Norwegian Lutheran priest

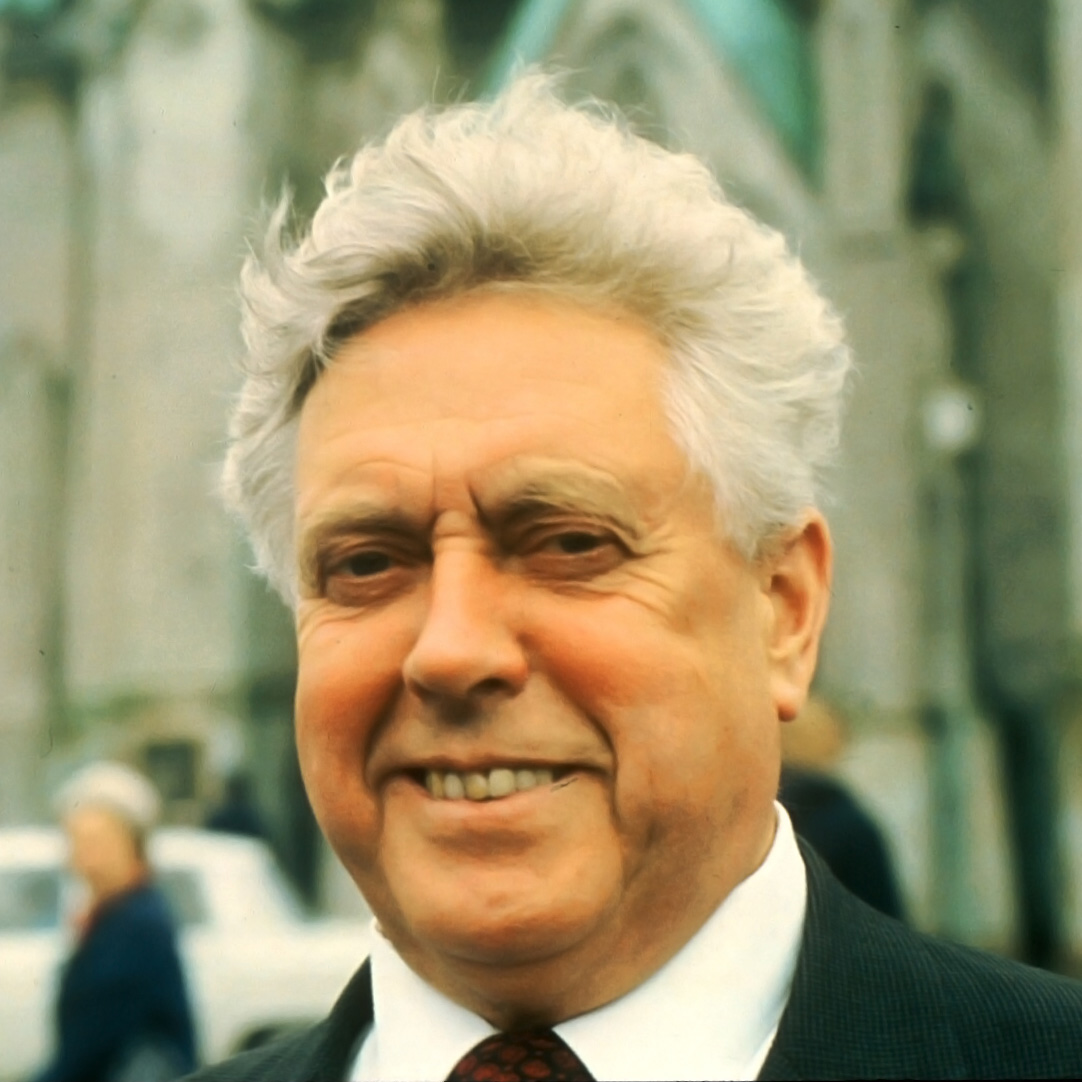
Image of Olav Kristian Stromme

Olav Kristian Strømme (November 22, 1907 – August 19, 1976) was a Norwegian Lutheran priest. He also established himself as a local historian and genealogical researcher, but he is best known for his fundraising activity for many aid projects. Through announcements in newspapers, he encouraged people to donate money to projects that had been started by Norwegian missionaries, and the sums that he collected through the ads gave him the reputation of an entire aid organization in one individual.

== Biography ==
Strømme received his degree in theology in 1932 and served as a vicar in several locations until he became a deacon at Kristiansand Cathedral in 1942. Here he remained, while his position changed over the years to perpetual curate and then resident curate. His duties included service as a prison priest and a hospital priest. However, it was as a fundraising organizer that he became known, a task he dedicated himself to until he died in 1976. He left behind NOK 3.3 million collected for various projects, and this provided the basis to create the Strømme Foundation to continue the work that Strømme had started. At Strømme's funeral, Kristiansand Cathedral was filled, and outside the church there were thousands more people that were unable to enter the church.

== Fundraising ==
In 1964, the missionary Agnar Espegren appeared on the television program Vi går ombord hosted by Erik Bye. There he described his work with drug addicts in Hong Kong. After the broadcast, contact was established between Strømme and Espegren, and fundraising took off quickly. Strømme's frank ability to ask for donations for relief work was greatly rewarded, and many received extra funding for initiatives that they could not otherwise afford.

== Awards ==
In 1973, Strømme received the King's Medal of Merit in gold.

== Legacy ==
The Strømme Foundation is named after Olav Kristian Strømme.
