= Norwegian Christian Student and School Association =

The Norwegian Christian Student and School Association (Norwegian: Norges Kristelige Student- og Skoleungdomslag or NKSS) is an evangelical Christian student movement with affiliate groups on university campuses in Norway. There are around 200 registered groups, in secondary, high school, and universities. It is a member of the International Fellowship of Evangelical Students. Members refer to NKSS as "The team" (Norwegian: Laget).
