= Erlend Flornes Skaret =

Norwegian writer (born 1976)

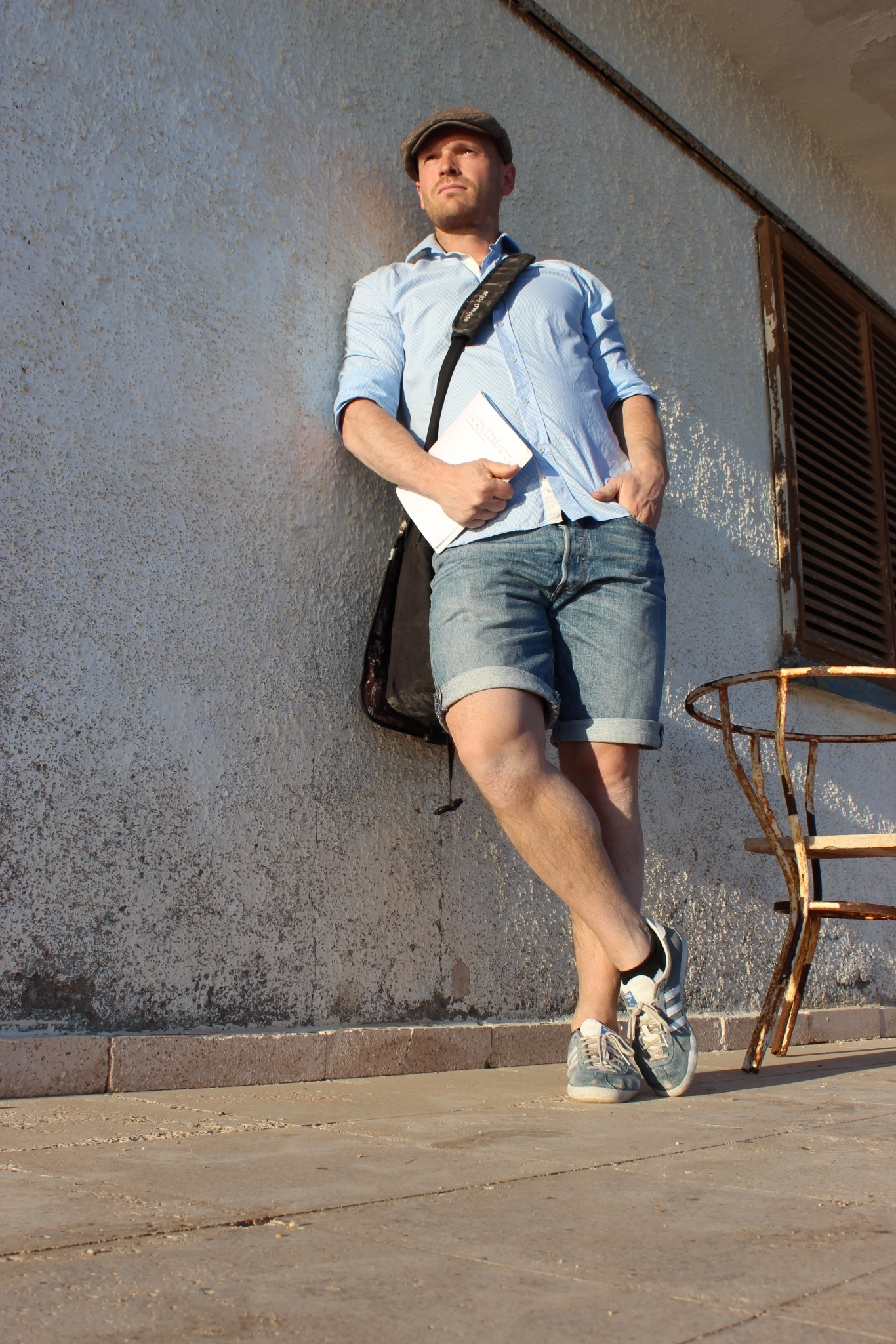
Erlend Flornes Skaret

Erlend Flornes Skaret (born 9 August 1976) is a Norwegian novelist.

He hails from Bremnes in Bømlo Municipality, Norway. Publishing on Samlaget, he issued the novels Wroclaw (2011) and Lucida (2013), and then the novel Nomade on Samleren. Wroclaw was set in Wrocław and was reviewed in several newspapers. Lucida was partially set in Spain, and reviewed in slightly fewer newspapers.
