= Oliver Dahl-Goli =

Norwegian politician

Oliver Dahl-Goli (13 August 1897 – 19 July 1976) was a Norwegian politician for the Christian Democratic Party.

He was born in Sandeherad Municipality. He was elected to the Norwegian Parliament from Bergen in 1961 on a joint list of the Conservative Party and the Christian Democratic Party. He was not re-elected in 1965.

He never held local political positions, but was involved in various Christian organizations. He was editor-in-chief of Fiskerens Venn from 1930 to 1961.
