= Bår Stenvik =

Norwegian writer (born 1976)

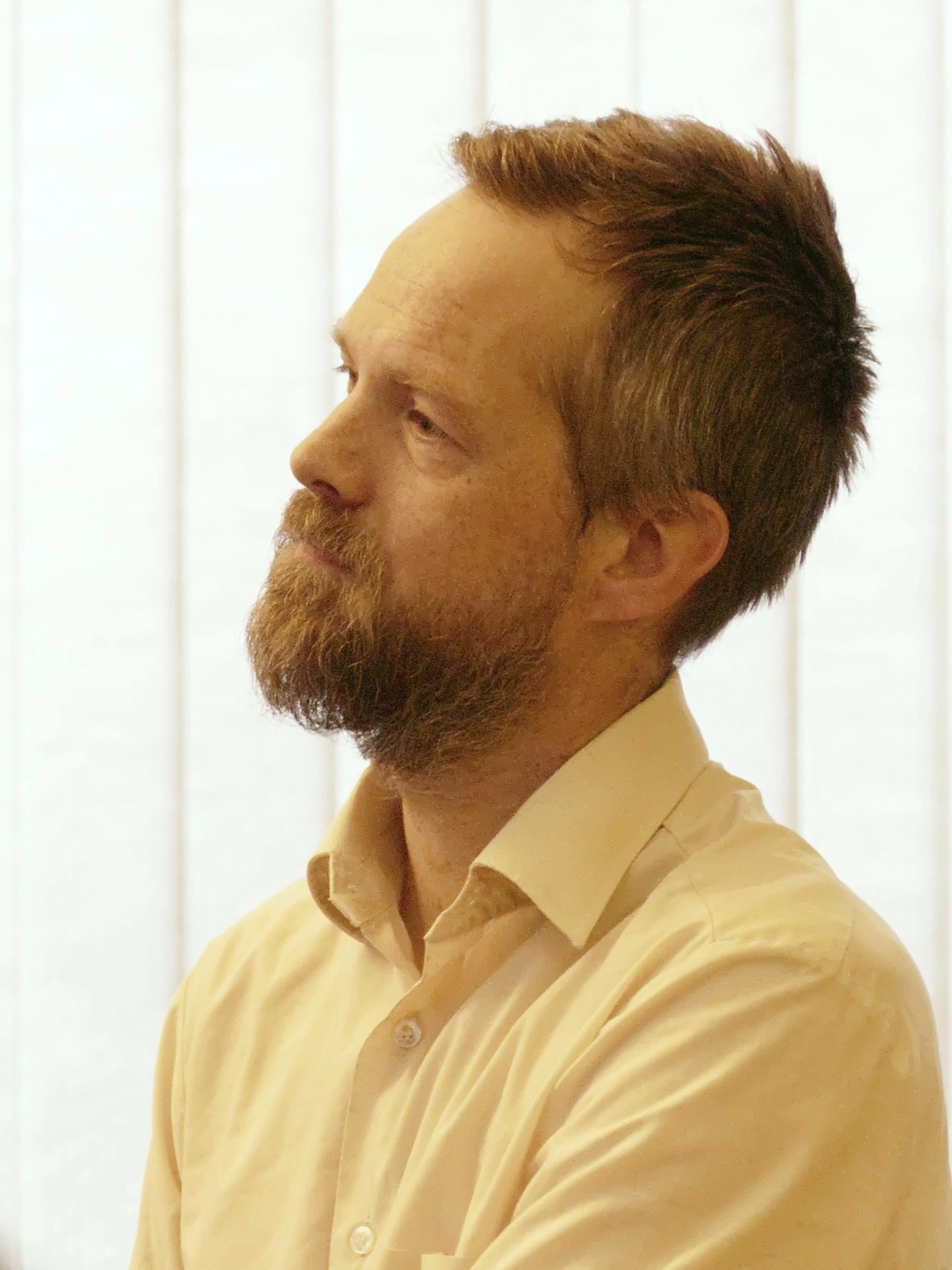
Bår Stenvik

Bår Stenvik (born 18 November 1976) is a Norwegian writer.

== Early life ==
He is from Namdalseid Municipality.

== Career ==
Stenvik wrote the children's non-fiction books Dataspill (2011) and Ti utrulege oppfinningar (2020), the non-fiction books Skitt (2011), Bløff (2014) and Å bli en annen (2016).

In 2011, he issued the novel Informasjonen, whose movie rights were bought by Bulldozer Film. He followed up with Det store spillet (2020).

== See also ==
- List of children's literature writers
- List of Norwegian writers
- List of novelists
