= Agvald Gjelsvik =

Norwegian educator and politician

Agvald Gjelsvik (14 August 1907 – 14 April 1976) was a Norwegian educator and politician for the Labour Party.

== Personal life ==
He was born in Tvedestrand as a son of teacher Andreas Gjelsvik (1863–1938) and Brita Bolstad (1872–1953). He was a nephew of Nikolaus Gjelsvik. In 1934 he married teacher Aase Hermansen.

== Career ==
He finished his secondary education in Arendal in 1926, and graduated from the Royal Frederick University with the cand.real. degree in 1933—specializing in astronomy. In the same year he was hired as a teacher at Orkdal District Gymnasium. When Vinstra District Gymnasium was established in 1946, Gjelsvik became its first principal. From 1969 to his retirement in 1975 he was the principal of Stabekk Upper Secondary School.

In 1958 he was named as a member of the national Council of Teaching, which among others was responsible for final examinations in the upper secondary school. He was promoted to chairman in 1962, and when the council was superseded by the Council of Gymnasiums in 1965, Gjelsvik continued as chairman until 1969. From 1963 to 1967 he led the Gjelsvik Committee that shaped the "reform gymnasium" in Norway, removing the former rigid division into science or philological courses. Gjelsvik also chaired the State Textbook Council from 1970, where he had become a member in 1962. He wrote textbooks himself in projective drawing (1946), mathematical geography (1954) and astronomy (1963), and translated other textbooks into Nynorsk.

Gjelsvik served in the municipal council of Nord-Fron Municipality from 1956 to 1960 and Oppland county school board from 1960 to 1964. He was a deputy representative to the Parliament of Norway from Oppland during the term 1965–1969, but did not meet in parliamentary session. He was a board member of Norsk Lektorlag from 1945 to 1950, and in 1968 he was named as deputy chairman of the Broadcasting Council. He died in October 1976 in Bærum Municipality.
