= Trygve Diskerud =

Norwegian harness racer

Trygve Diskerud (6 October 1903 – 2 June 1976) is a Norwegian harness racer.

He won 1727 races during his career, among them ten Norwegian championships.
