= Alstadhaug =

Village in Levanger Municipality, Norway

- Village
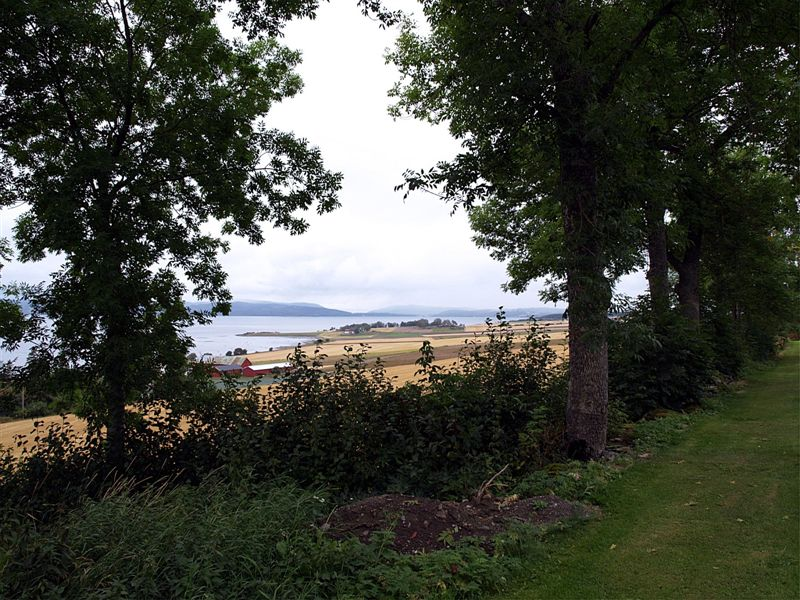
- View of the church area
- Interactive map of Alstadhaug
- Location within Trøndelag Location within Norway
- Coordinates: 63.7239°N 11.2250°E
- Country: Norway
- Region: Central Norway
- County: Trøndelag
- District: Innherred
- Municipality: Levanger Municipality
- Elevation: 53 m (174 ft)
- Time zone: UTC+01:00 (CET)
  - Summer (DST): UTC+02:00 (CEST)
- Post Code: 7620 Skogn

Alstadhaug is small village in Levanger Municipality in Trøndelag county, Norway. It is located northeast of the village of Skogn, south of the village of Nesset, and west of the village of Momarka. The area is also a Church of Norway parish based at the Alstadhaug Church which is located in the village. The village area and church are both located on top of a hill overlooking great parts of Levanger and the Trondheimsfjord region.

== Name ==
The name, which can be traced back to prehistoric times, is derived from the farm of Alstadhaug, located next to the Alstadhaug Church. The etymology of Alstadaug is unknown, but the first element might be a personal name.
