= Munkeby Abbey =

Former monastery in Trøndelag, Norway

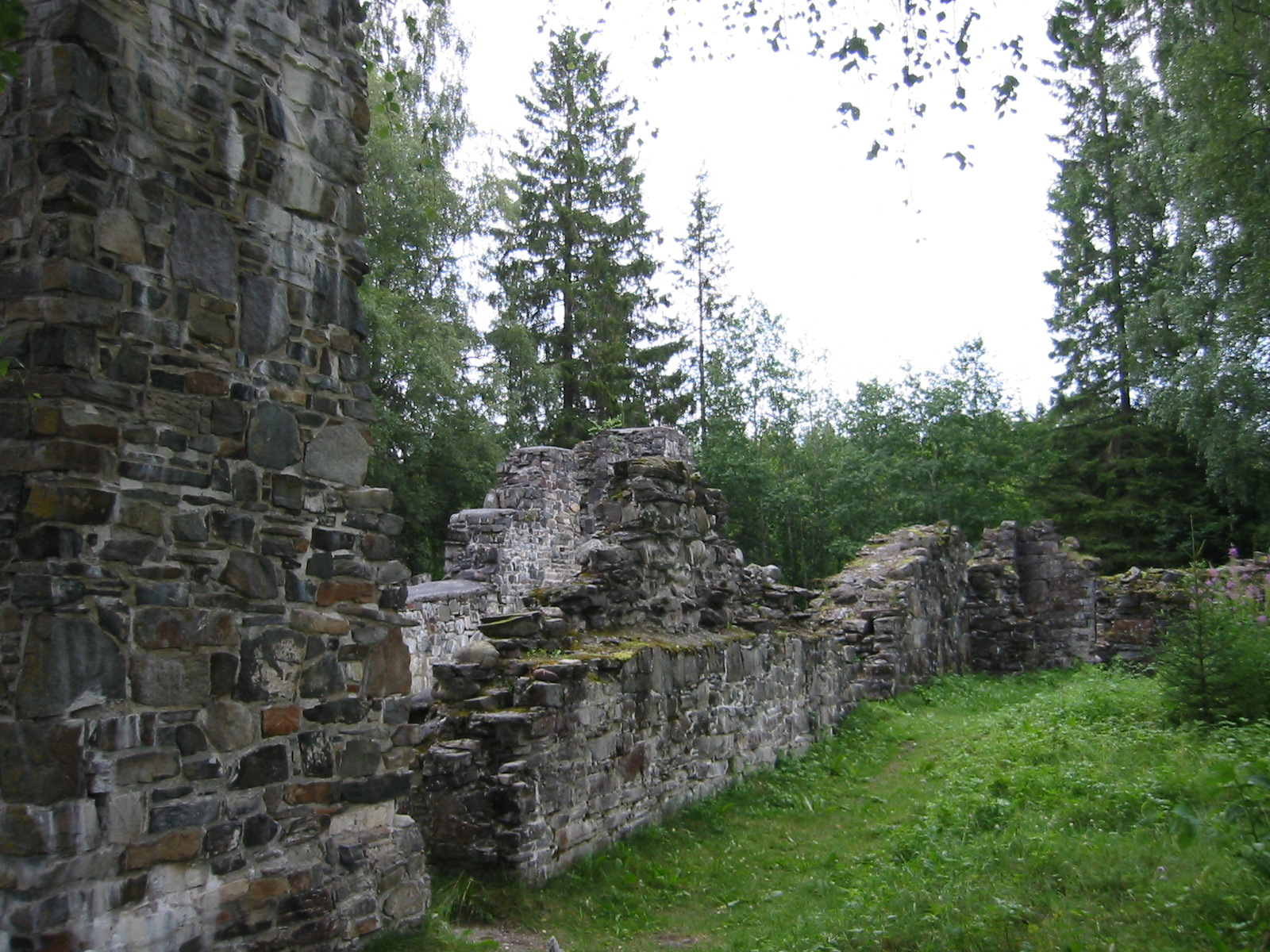
- View of the ruins

- Location within Trøndelag
- Interactive map of Munkeby Abbey

Monastery information
- Other name: Norwegian: Munkeby kloster
- Order: Cistercian
- Established: 12th century
- Disestablished: 13th century
- Mother house: Tautra Abbey
- Dedication: Saint Brettiva

Site
- Location: Okkenhaug, Levanger Municipality, Norway
- Coordinates: 63.7304°N 11.3855°E
- Visible remains: Church foundation and walls
- Public access: Yes

Munkeby Abbey (Norwegian: Munkeby kloster) was a Cistercian monastery near the village of Okkenhaug in Levanger Municipality in Trøndelag county, Norway. It was located about 5 kilometres (3.1 mi) east of the town of Levanger. The name "Munkeby" in Norwegian means Place of the Monks. It was closed during the Protestant Reformation. Today the former abbey is the sight of medieval ruins (Munkeby klosterruin) which are managed by the Society for the Preservation of Ancient Norwegian Monuments (Fortidsminneforeningen).

== History ==
The abbey was founded sometime between 1150 and 1180, and was the most northerly Cistercian foundation in the world. Possibly, like Hovedøya Abbey and Lyse Abbey, Munkeby's foundation was carried out by English monks. In 1207, Tautra Abbey was founded, and, either then or at some later point in the 13th century that the community and assets of Munkeby were transferred to the new foundation, of which Munkeby then became a grange.

An attempt to re-establish it as an independent house in the 1470s failed. The church, however, continued in use as a parish church until 1587. It has sometimes been asserted that the church here was the same as that dedicated to the local Saint Brettiva in Skogn, but this has not found general acceptance.

Local tradition had always maintained that Okkenhaug Chapel had once belonged to a monastery; for centuries historians dismissed this, until in 1906, a letter dated 1475 from Pope Sixtus IV to Abbot Stephen of Trugge was discovered in the Vatican archives referring to the request for the restoration of the site as a functioning monastery.

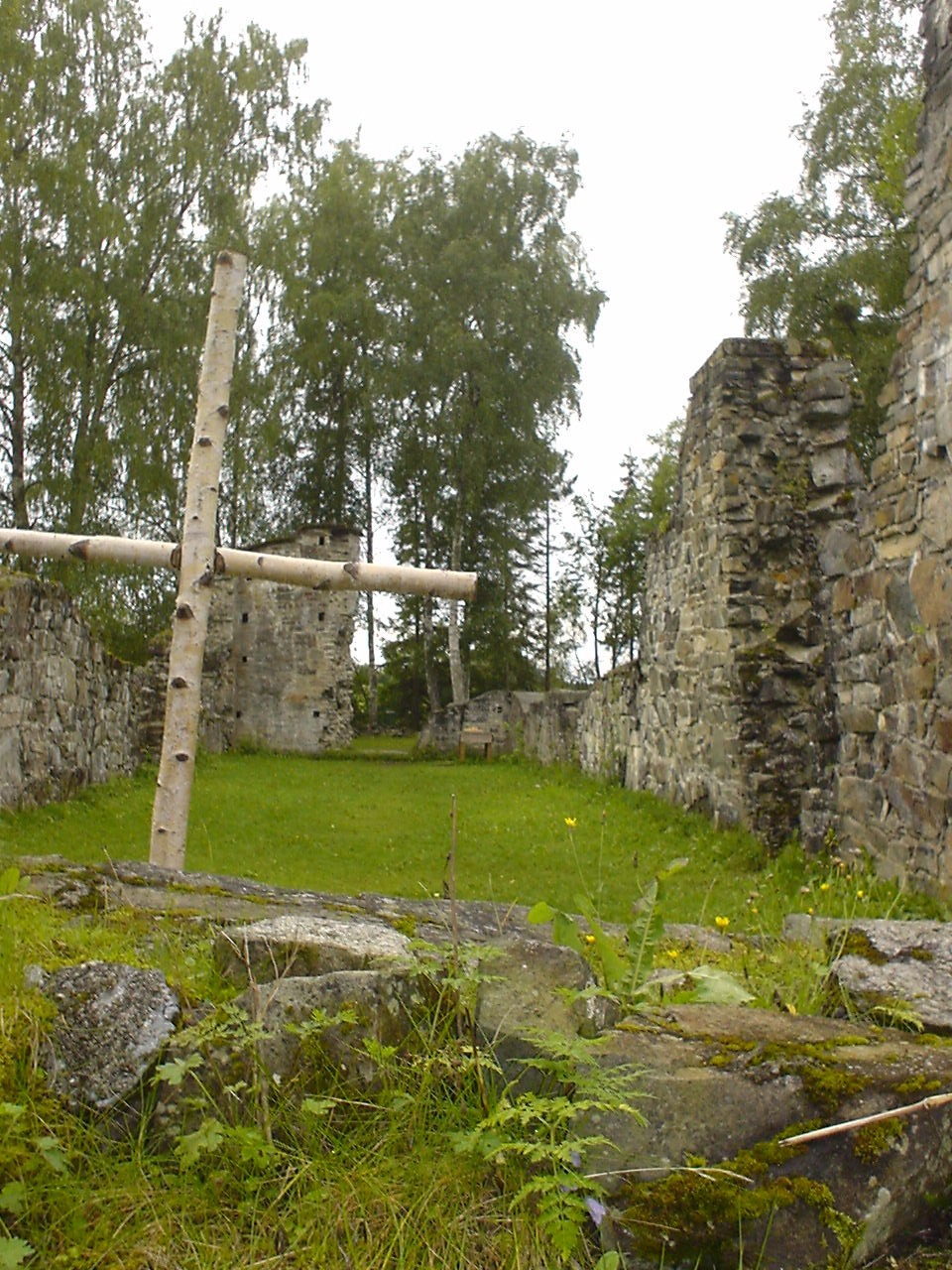
Munkeby Abbey ruins

Norway accepted the Protestant Reformation and officially became a Lutheran kingdom in 1537. All Roman Catholic religious houses were then seized and declared to be Crown property as was true of Munkeby.

== Site ==
There are substantial remains of the simple church, built of stone, although it was used as a quarry, but the monastic buildings, built of wood, apparently succumbed to fire in 1567. The site was acquired by the Society for the Preservation of Ancient Norwegian Monuments (Fortidsminneforeningen) in 1967. No full archaeological investigation of the site has been carried out, but many partial excavations have taken place, including test excavations in 2000, none of which able to discover significant remains of the monastic buildings, although there is no doubt that they were located on the south side of the church.

== Munkeby Mariakloster ==
In 2007, the now-Trappist Abbey of Cîteaux in France decided to establish a new monastery at Munkeby. A monastery was built, and four monks took residence there in 2009. The new monastery is situated about 1.5 kilometres (0.93 mi) from the medieval ruins. They now form a companion community to the Trappistine nuns who have re-settled the site of the former Tautra Abbey. The name of the modern house is simply Munkeby Mariakloster.

== See also ==
- Tautra Abbey
- Citeaux Abbey

== Sources ==
- Barton, K.; Stenvik, L.; Binns, R.; Eide, E; Kimo, I.M. (7 March 2007). Geophysical Surveys at Munkeby Kloster, Levanger, Trøndelag, Norway. IT Sligo. Norwegian University of Science and Technology and Institute of Technology, Sligo.
- Bugge, Alexander (1909). "Et ukjendt kloster nordenfjelds". Historisk tidsskrift (in Norwegian). XX.
- Brand & Helland A.S. Munkeby klosterruin: en tilstandsrapport med forslag til fremtidig vedlikehold (in Norwegian).
- Ekroll, Ø. Munkeby-Tautra. Cisterciensermunkenes klosterruiner i Trøndelag (in Norwegian).
- Foosnæs, Kristin (2006). Quod superest monasterii hic quondam fundati: en bygningsarkeologisk undersøkelse av Munkeby kloster (MA in Archaeology thesis) (in Norwegian). Trondheim: NTNU.
- Foosnæs, Kristin (2005). "'Quod superest monasterii hic quondam fundati' Munkeby kloster". Spor (in Norwegian). 2005 (2). Trondheim: NTNU Vitenskapsmuseet.
- Hallan, Nils. "Skogn Historie" (in Norwegian).
- Klüwer, Lorentz Diderich. "Norske Mindesmerker" (in Norwegian).
- Krüger, S; Smestad, I (1993). "Kulturminner i Stjørdal, Frosta, Levanger, Verdal, Inderøy, Steinkjer" (in Norwegian).
- Liden, H-E. "Munkeby kloster ved Levanger". Foreningen til norske fortidsminnesmerkers bevaling. Årbok 1969 (in Norwegian).
- McGregor, Michael. "Cistercienserklosteret på Munkeby". Spor (in Norwegian). 2000 (2).
- Geologiske kart. NGU.
- Parelius, Nils. "Munkeby klosterruin". Årbok 1955 (in Norwegian). Trondhjems Turistforening.
- Raaen, P; Skevik, O. "Helligdom og verdier ved to årtusenskifter: foredrag fra flere seminarer ved årtusenskiftet samt populærforedrag under olsokdagene på Stiklestad" (in Norwegian).
- Ryjord, Nils. Indberetning om de avsluttende utgravinger av Munkeby klosterkirkes ruiner 1910 (in Norwegian). Fortidsminnesmerkeforeningens årsberetning 1910.
- Ryjord, Nils; Rygh, Karl. Munkeby kirke ved Levanger (in Norwegian). Fortidsminnesmerkersforeningens årsberetning 1906.
- Schøning, G. Reise giennom en Del af Norge i de år 1773, 1774, 1775 (in Norwegian).
