= Norwegian County Road 774 =

County road in Trøndelag, Norway

Coordinates: 63.74998°N 11.30878°E

County Road 774
- Bokmål: Fylkesvei 774; Nynorsk: Fylkesveg 774

Route information
- Maintained by Statens vegvesen
- Length: 4.2 km (2.6 mi)

Major junctions
- East end: E6 at Mule
- Levanger–Hokstad Ferry
- West end: Fv135 at Hokstad

Location
- Country: Norway
- Counties: Trøndelag
- Major cities: Levanger

Highway system
- Roads in Norway; National Roads; County Roads
| ← Fv773 | → Fv775 |

Norwegian County Road 774 (Norwegian: Fylkesvei 774) is a 4.2-kilometre (2.6 mi) long county road in Levanger Municipality in Trøndelag county, Norway. It begins at the junction with the European route E06 highway at the village of Mule. It then heads into and through parts of the town of Levanger. There, the road continues as the Levanger–Hokstad Ferry operated by Tide Sjø to the village of Hokstad on the island of Ytterøya. After the ferry, the road changes to Norwegian County Road 135.

Before 1 January 2010, it was known as Norwegian national road 774 (Riksvei 774), but control was transferred to the county so now it is a Norwegian county road (Fylkesvei).

== Path from east to west ==
- ← E6 Mule (eastern terminus)
- Fv134→ to Røstadlia (and E6 at Salthammer)
- ← Fv128 to E6 at Lysaker
- Levangselva bridge
- Fv125 to Kirkegata in the town of Levanger
- Levanger–Hokstad Ferry with service to the island of Ytterøya (11 trips per day, 30 minute voyage)
- ← Fv135 (western terminus)
