= Okkenhaug =

Village in Levanger Municipality, Norway

- Village
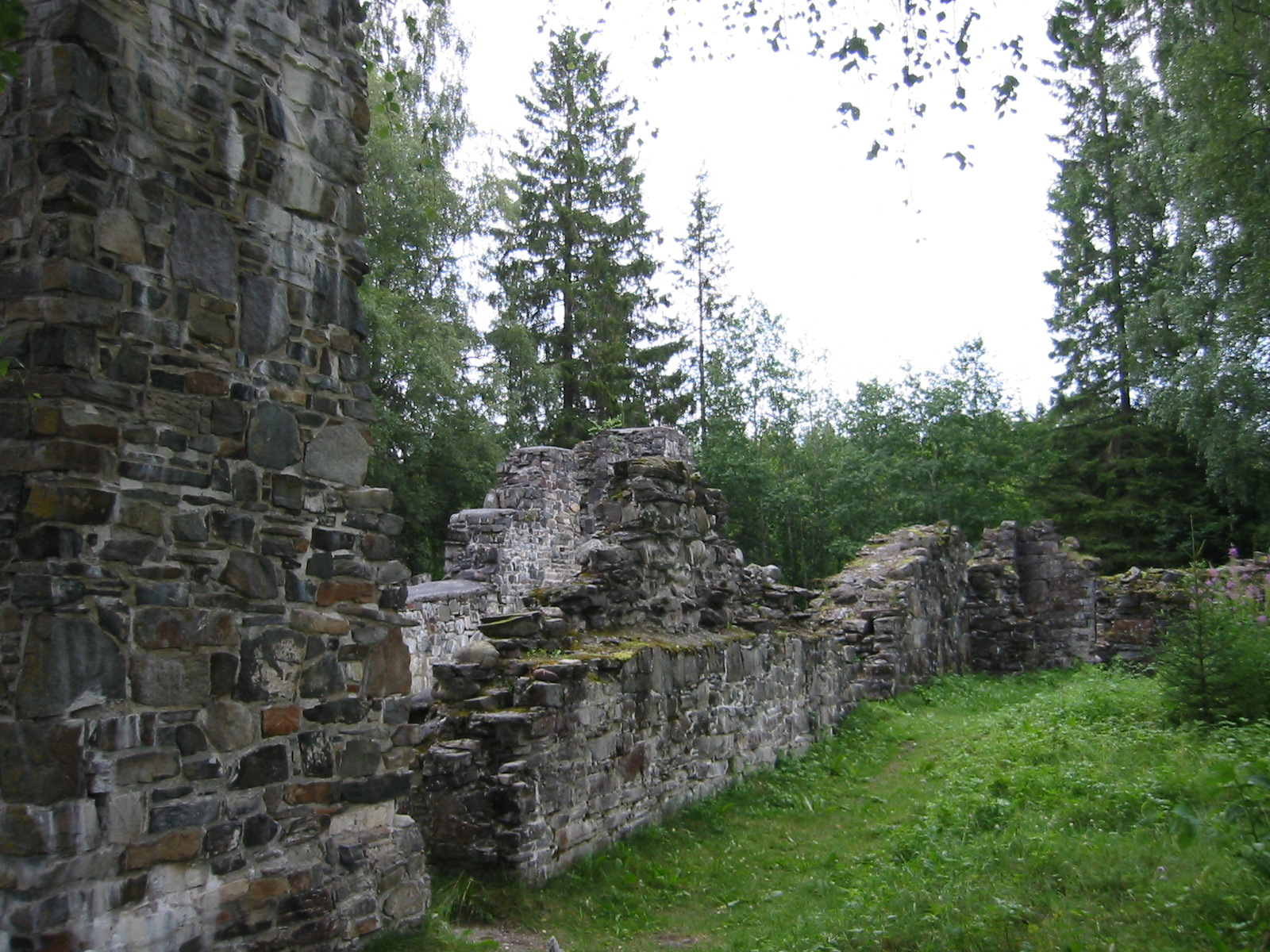
- View of the Munkeby ruins at Okkenhaug
- Interactive map of Okkenhaug
- Location within Trøndelag Location within Norway
- Coordinates: 63.5804°N 10.9095°E
- Country: Norway
- Region: Central Norway
- County: Trøndelag
- District: Innherred
- Municipality: Levanger Municipality
- Elevation: 55 m (180 ft)
- Time zone: UTC+01:00 (CET)
  - Summer (DST): UTC+02:00 (CEST)
- Post Code: 7600 Levanger

Okkenhaug is a village in Levanger Municipality in Trøndelag county, Norway. It is located just north of the Levangselva river, about 8 kilometres (5.0 mi) east of the town of Levanger. Okkenhaug Church is located here and the historic ruins of the Munkeby Abbey are located nearby.
