= Kirkegata (Levanger) =

Main street of Levanger, Trøndelag, Norway

Kirkegata with Christmas decorations

Kirkegata (Norwegian: Church Street) is the main street of the town of Levanger which is located inside Levanger Municipality in Trøndelag county, Norway. The street is parted on the middle by Øverparken with the famous fountain and the town square, referred to as "Torget" by locals. The current/"modern" street plot of Levanger was laid out by the Swedish king Carl III in the early 19th century.

The street is laid out in an axis from the Mo farm area in the southwest to the northeast. It passes by the Levanger videregående skole, Nord University, Levanger Church (hence the name "Kirkegata"), down to the Levangselva river bridge, the lower harbour area, and the old Levanger slaughter house. At the northeastern end of the road, it joins Norwegian County Road 774.

== Character ==
=== Wooden houses ===
Most of the buildings facing Kirkegata are old wooden houses of a very fine and distinct character, constructed towards the end of the 19th century, following the last of the great fires of Levanger (in 1848, 1863 and 1897). The last fire prompted new and better fire protection measures, such as a firewall between each house. The general high amount of fine wooden houses in Levanger, has earned Levanger the status as national wooden house town in Norway. Some fine wooden houses were demolished and replaced by modern buildings in the 1950s-1970s and even later.

=== Other distinctive buildings ===
Not all of the old houses lining Kirkegata are old wooden houses. The old Levanger bank building is constructed from brick. The only proper hotel in downtown Levanger, Backlund Norlandia hotel, is to be found in Kirkegata 41. The modern Backlund is a multi-story brick building erected after the old one was destroyed in a fire. The old Backlund hotel was famous for having housed the Swedish king Oscar II. The new one housed the Norwegian king Olav V in the 1960s. A modern spa hotel, Levanger Fjordhotell and Spa, is to be constructed down at the harbour area, a part of a gentrification process, including the transformation of the old Trønder Mat factory (a meat processing plant) into high class apartments.

=== Dining ===
Numerous cafés, pubs, and bars are located along Kirkegata. No39 is a cafe in the ground floor of Backlund hotel, that offers an outdoor area during summertime. Oskars Irish Pub is an Irish themed pub, offering beer and whiskey. They can also offer an outdoor area during summer.

== Gallery ==
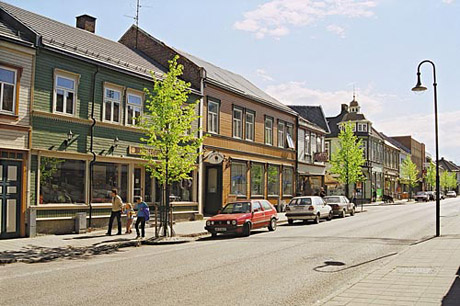
View of some of the wooden houses

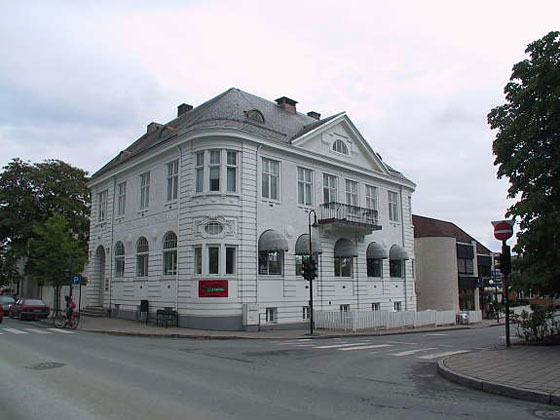
The old Levanger bank building

Oskars Irish pub
