= Per Erik Bergsjø =

Norwegian Supreme Court Justice

Per Erik Bergsjø (born 1958) is a Norwegian lawyer and judge.

He was born in Levanger Municipality and graduated with the cand.jur. degree in 1985. After three years as a consultant and adviser in the Ministry of Justice and the Police from 1986 to 1989, he served as a deputy judge in Nord-Troms District Court for one year and then a presiding judge in the same court from 1990 to 1993.

He was then hired in the law firm Vogt & Co (later merged to form Vogt & Wiig) in 1993. He was a partner there from 1995 to 2012; since 2000 as a barrister with eligibility to work with Supreme Court cases. He was then appointed as a Supreme Court Justice in March 2012.
