= Mule, Norway =

Village in Levanger Municipality, Norway

Mule Mula
- Village
- Interactive map of Mule; Mula
- Location within Trøndelag Location within Norway
- Coordinates: 63.7569°N 11.3933°E
- Country: Norway
- Region: Central Norway
- County: Trøndelag
- District: Innherred
- Municipality: Levanger Municipality

Area
  - Total: 0.22 km^{2} (0.085 sq mi)
- Elevation: 64 m (210 ft)

Population (2024)
  - Total: 240
  - Density: 1,091/km^{2} (2,830/sq mi)
- Time zone: UTC+01:00 (CET)
  - Summer (DST): UTC+02:00 (CEST)
- Post Code: 7600 Levanger

Mule or Mula is a village in Levanger Municipality in Trøndelag county, Norway. The village area is located at the intersection of Norwegian County Road 774 and European route E6, about 4 kilometres (2.5 mi) east of the town of Levanger. The Nordlandsbanen railway line also runs through Mule. The village has a school and a daycare centre.

The 0.22-square-kilometre (54-acre) village has a population (2024) of 240 and a population density of 1,091 inhabitants per square kilometre (2,830/sq mi).
