= Bamberg Church =

Church in Trøndelag, Norway

- Bamberg kirke
- Bamberg Church
- 63.750340989°N 11.278636872°E
- Location: Levanger Municipality, Trøndelag
- Country: Norway
- Denomination: Church of Norway
- Churchmanship: Evangelical Lutheran

History
- Status: Parish church
- Founded: 1998
- Consecrated: 30 Aug 1998

Architecture
- Functional status: Active
- Architectural type: Rectangular
- Completed: 1998 (28 years ago)

Specifications
- Materials: Wood

Administration
- Diocese: Nidaros bispedømme
- Deanery: Stiklestad prosti
- Parish: Levanger

Bamberg Church (Norwegian: Bamberg kirke) is a parish church of the Church of Norway in Levanger Municipality in Trøndelag county, Norway. It is located in the Neset area of the town of Levanger. It is an annex church for the Levanger parish which is part of the Stiklestad prosti (deanery) in the Diocese of Nidaros. The church was built in 1998 and it was consecrated on 30 August 1998. From 1998 until 2015 the building was also used as the parish nursery school.

== See also ==
- List of churches in Nidaros
