= Nesset, Levanger =

Village in Levanger Municipality, Norway

Nesset
- Village
- Interactive map of Nesset
- Location within Trøndelag Location within Norway
- Coordinates: 63.7444°N 11.2461°E
- Country: Norway
- Region: Central Norway
- County: Trøndelag
- District: Innherred
- Municipality: Levanger Municipality
- Elevation: 45 m (148 ft)
- Time zone: UTC+01:00 (CET)
  - Summer (DST): UTC+02:00 (CEST)
- Post Code: 7600 Levanger

Nesset is a village area in Levanger Municipality in Trøndelag county, Norway. It is located on a peninsula in the Trondheimsfjord just west of the town of Levanger, and north of Alstadhaug. Bamberg Church is located in Nesset.

The 0.07-square-kilometre (17-acre) village had a population (1999) of 245 and a population density of 3,638 inhabitants per square kilometre (9,420/sq mi). Since 1999, the population and area data for this village area has not been separately tracked by Statistics Norway, but rather it has since been considered part of the town of Levanger.
