= Alstadhaug Church =

Church in Trøndelag, Norway

- Alstadhaug kirke
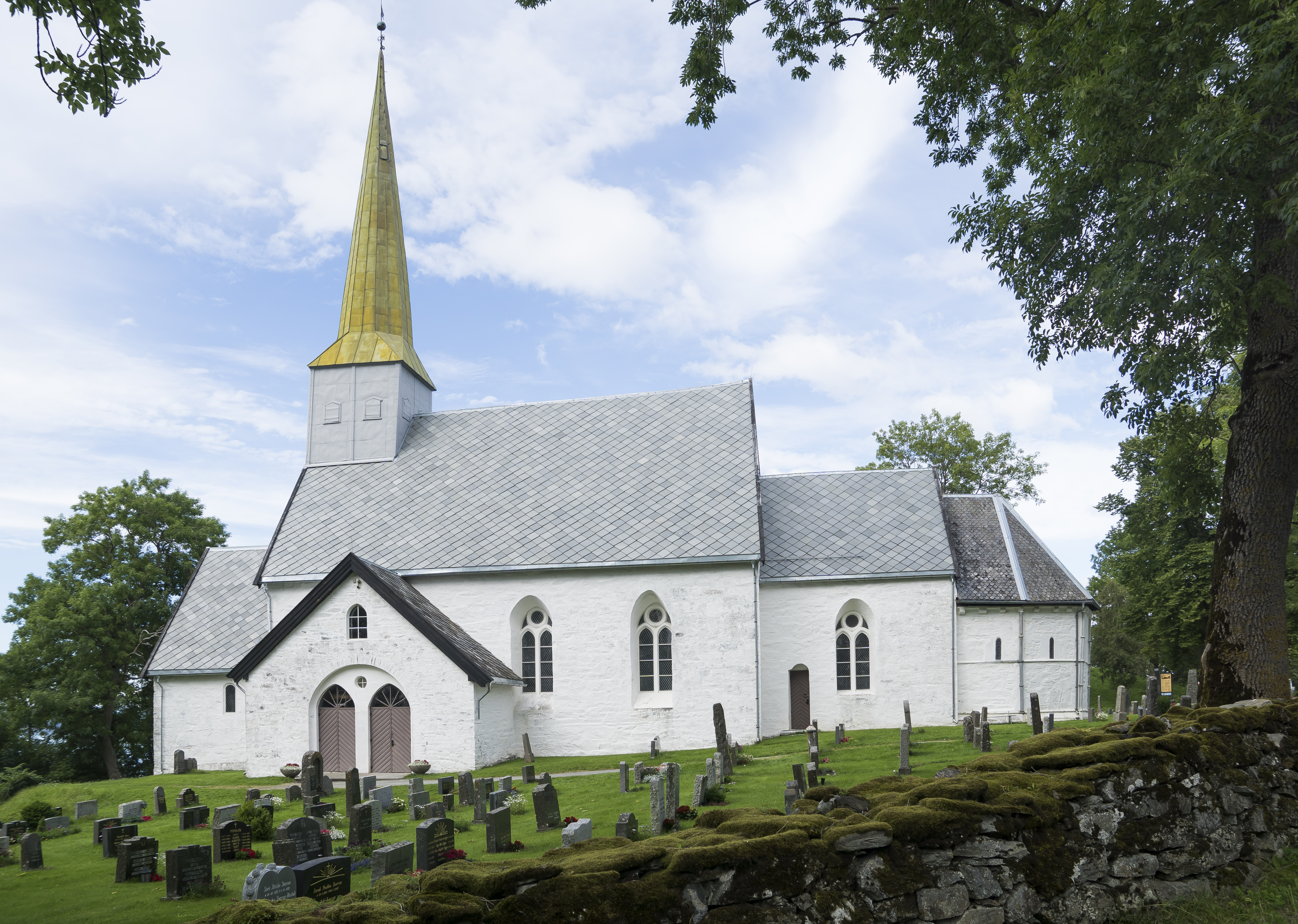
- View of the church
- Alstadhaug Church
- 63.72389485°N 11.2251707911°E
- Location: Levanger Municipality, Trøndelag
- Country: Norway
- Denomination: Church of Norway
- Previous denomination: Catholic Church
- Churchmanship: Evangelical Lutheran

History
- Status: Parish church
- Founded: c. 1170
- Consecrated: c. 1170

Architecture
- Functional status: Active
- Architectural type: Long church
- Style: Romanesque and Gothic
- Completed: c. 1170 (856 years ago)

Specifications
- Capacity: 238
- Materials: Stone

Administration
- Diocese: Nidaros bispedømme
- Deanery: Stiklestad prosti
- Parish: Alstadhaug
- Norwegian Cultural Heritage Site
- Type: Church
- Status: Automatically protected
- ID: 83770

Alstadhaug Church (Norwegian: Alstadhaug kirke) is a parish church of the Church of Norway in the village of Alstadhaug in Levanger Municipality in Trøndelag county. It is the church for the Alstadhaug parish, which is part of the Stiklestad prosti (deanery) in the Diocese of Nidaros. The church was built in a long church style during the 12th century by an unknown architect. The church seats about 238 people.

== History ==
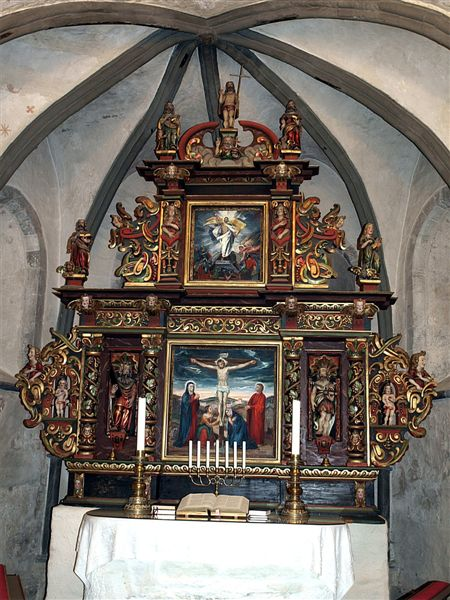
Altarpiece carve by woodcarver Johan Johansen

The earliest existing historical records of the church date back to the year 1280, but the church was likely built during the mid- to late 1100s. It features elements from both Romanesque and Gothic architecture. The church has a rectangular nave measuring about 20 by 12.5 metres (66 ft × 41 ft) and a narrower, square chancel with a lower roof line that measures about 8 by 8 metres (26 ft × 26 ft). The church building is built of stone with wood ceilings. Dendrochronology surveys of the roof show the timber dates to the years 1166–67. It is therefore likely that the church was completed around the year 1170. Construction on the church likely began 20 to 30 years before its completion (around 1130–1140).

Next to the church is Olvishaugen, a large burial mound. Olvishaugen measures 55 metres (180 ft) across and has a height of almost 6 metres (20 ft). It has not been excavated but estimates have dated it from the Iron Age (5th to 8th centuries AD).

The church originally had a large tower on the west end, but in the early 1200s the tower was dismantled and its stone was used to build an octagonal apse to enlarge the choir and two retaining walls along the southwest corner of the nave. A sacristy in stone was built on the north side of the choir in the early 15th century. Over the centuries the building has been remodeled several times and the floor plan has undergone several changes. The interior features the remains of murals from the 13th century with famous Biblical motifs. The altarpiece dating from the 1650s was carved by Trøndelag-based artist and craftsman Johan Johansen (d. 1657) who was called a woodcarver (bilthugger) and painted by Johan Hanssønn listed as portrait artist (kontrafeier). Around the year 1700, a new porch was built on the southwest entrance to the church. In 1788, a new tower and spire was built on top of the nave's roof.

In 1814, this church served as an election church (Norwegian: valgkirke). Together with more than 300 other parish churches across Norway, it was a polling station for elections to the 1814 Norwegian Constituent Assembly which wrote the Constitution of Norway. This was Norway's first national elections. Each church parish was a constituency that elected people called "electors" who later met together in each county to elect the representatives for the assembly that was to meet at Eidsvoll Manor later that year.

== Media gallery ==
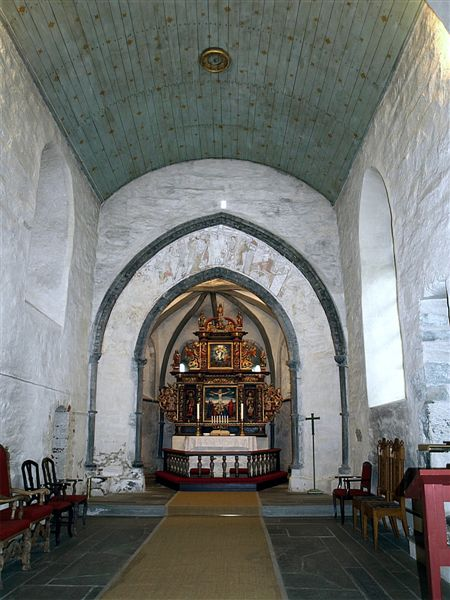
Church nave
Credit: Hideko Bondesen

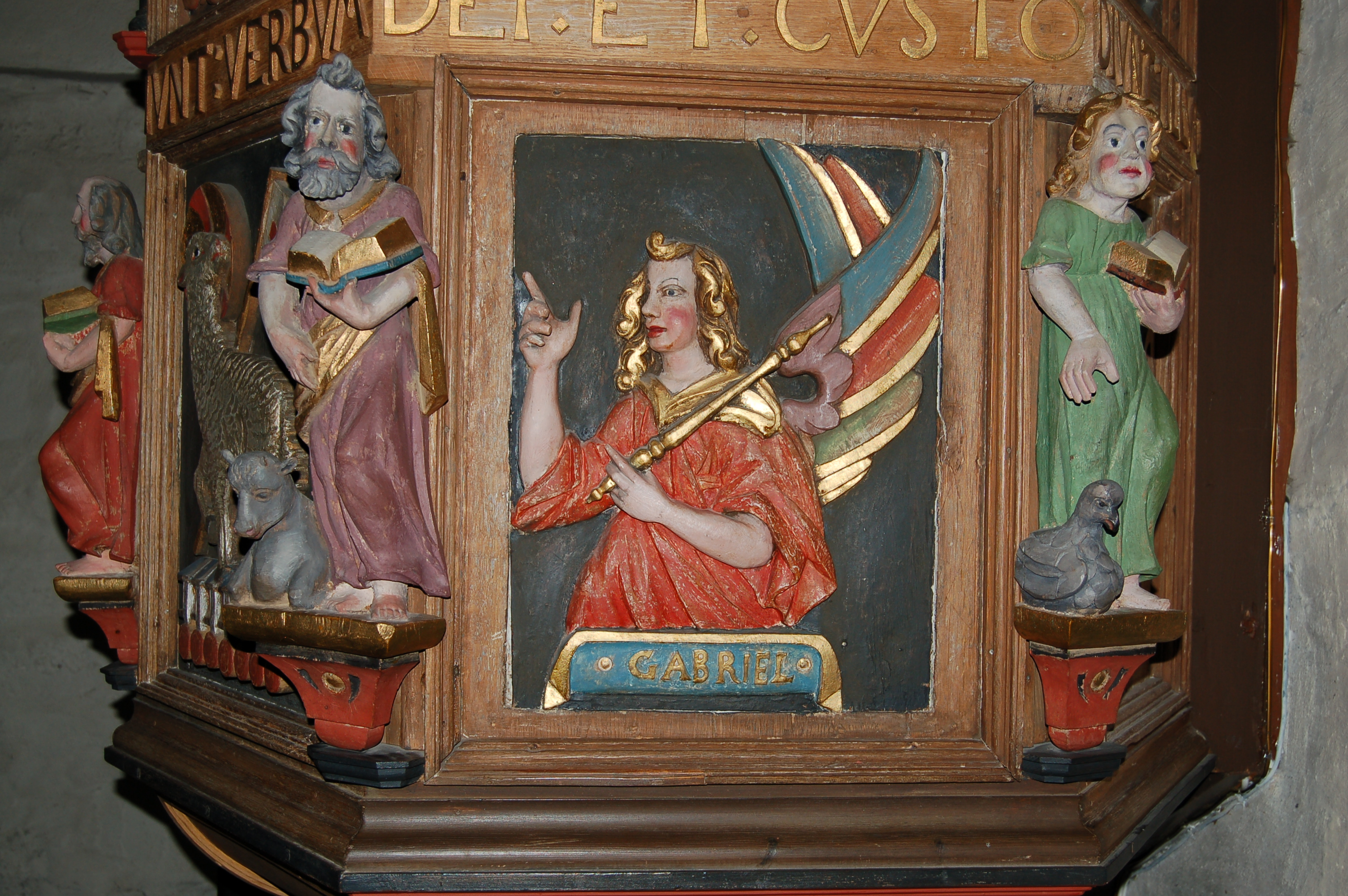
Pulpit details, angel Gabriel
Credit: Arnstein Rønning

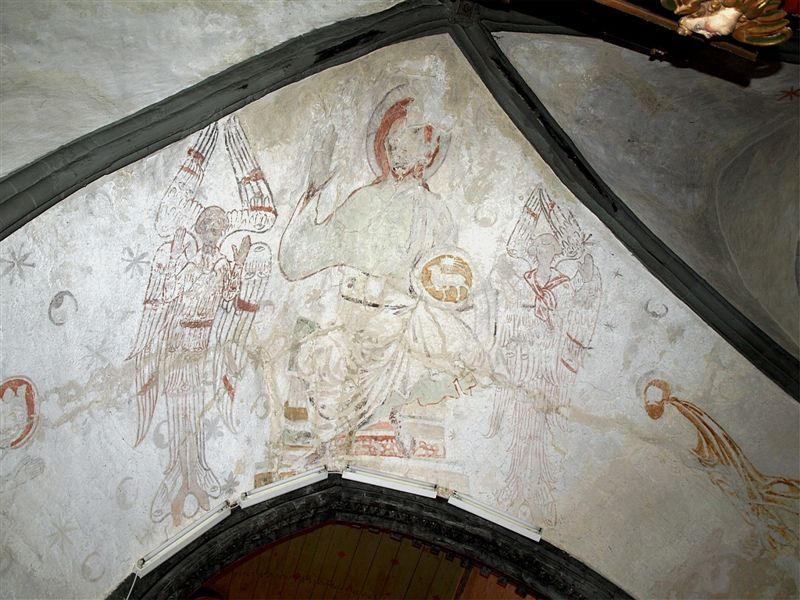
Fresco over apse arc
Credit: Hideko Bondesen

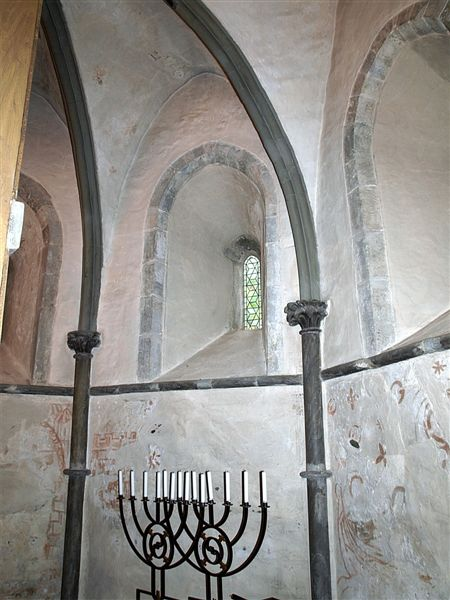
Details of octagonal apse
Credit: Hideko Bondesen

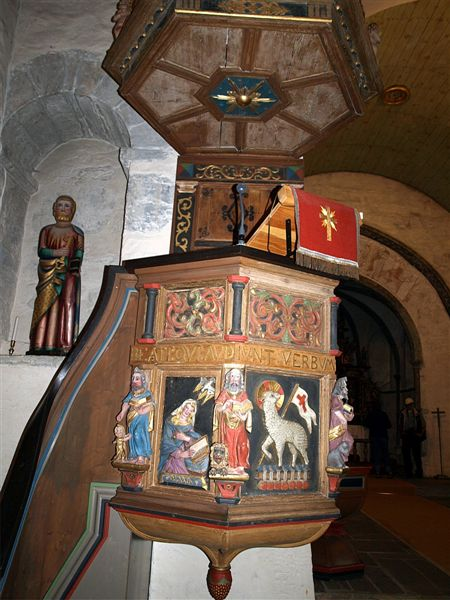
Credit: Hideko Bondesen

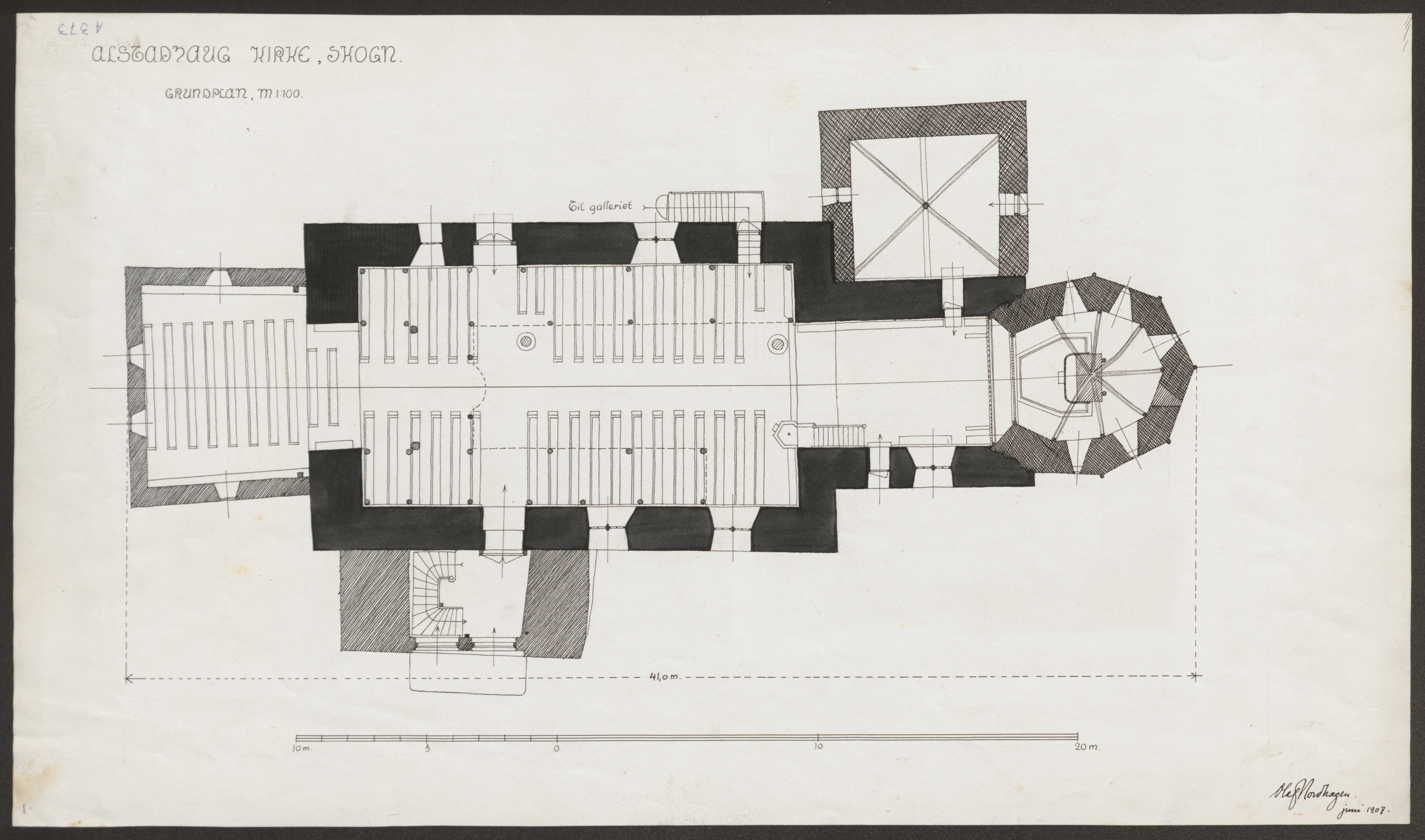
Church floor plan

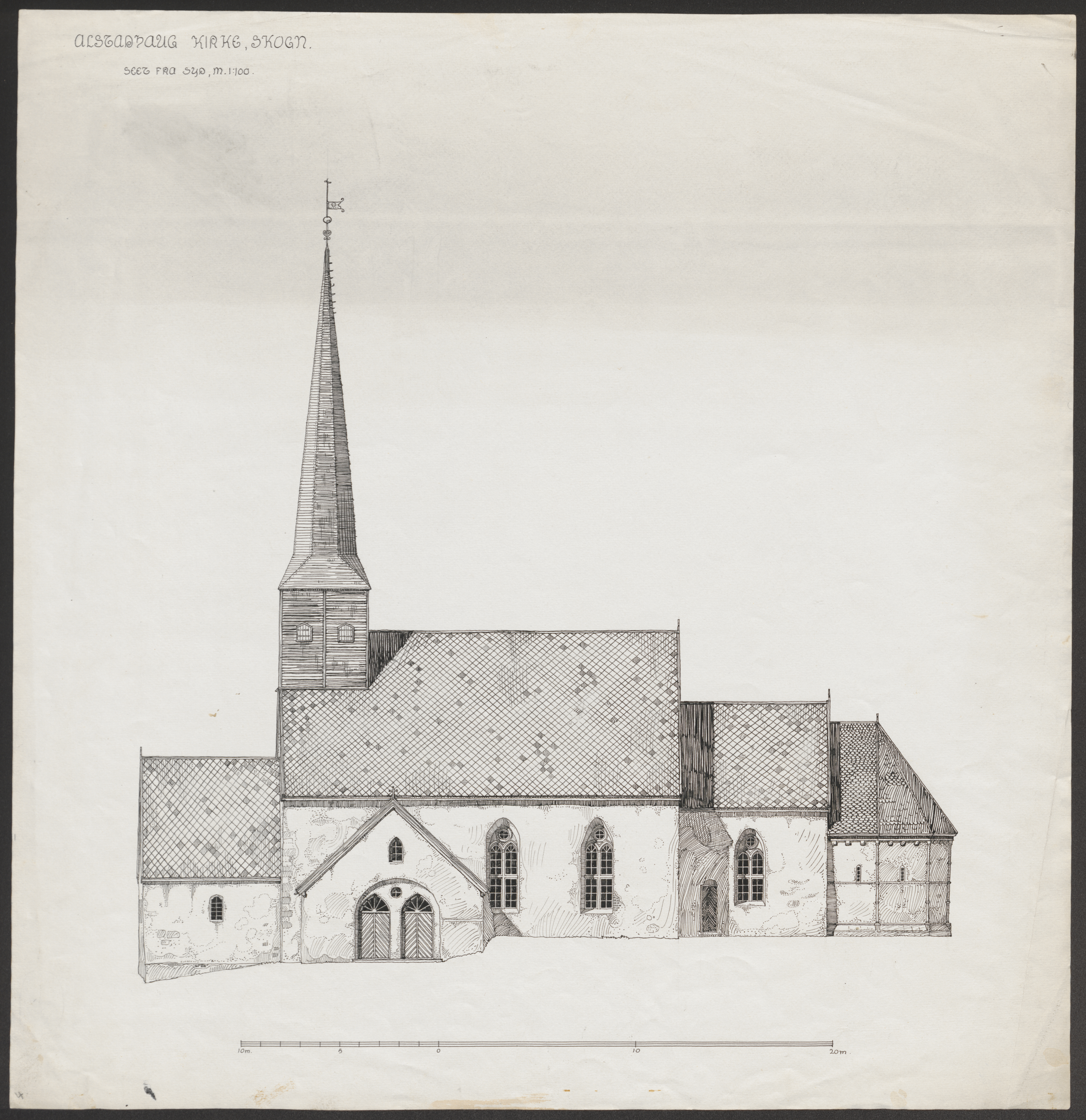
Side view

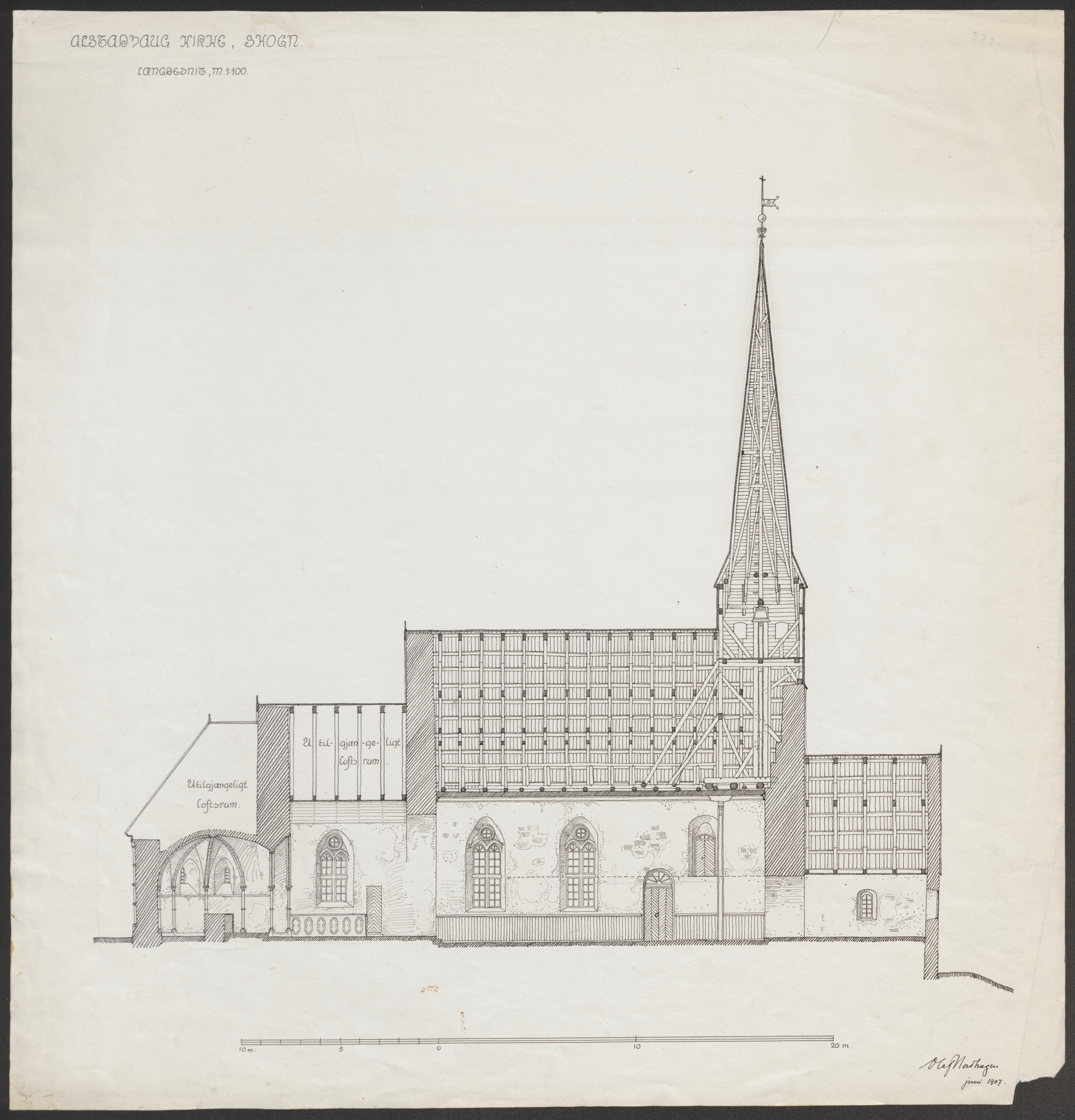
Side view

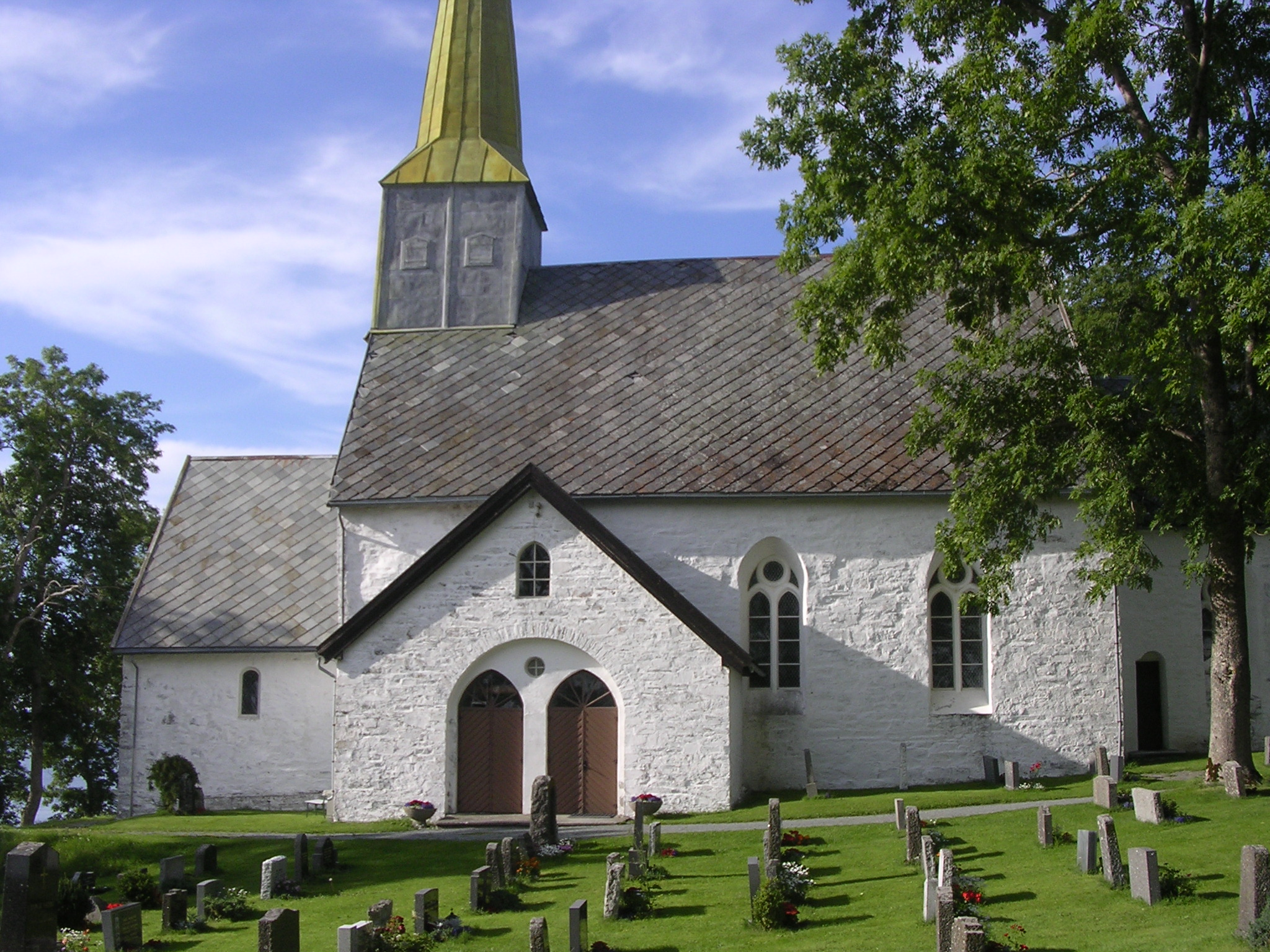
Exterior side view

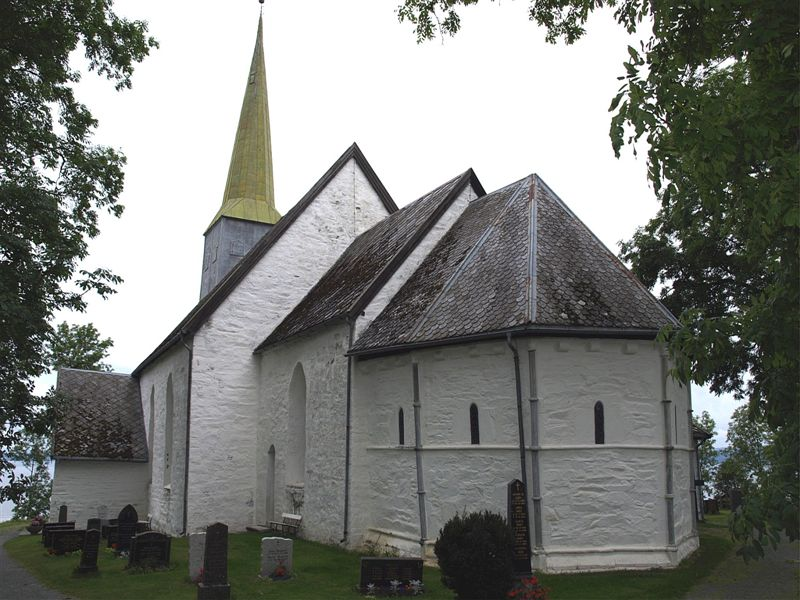
Chancel and apse view

== See also ==
- List of churches in Nidaros
