= Levanger Church =

Church in Trøndelag, Norway

- Levanger kirke
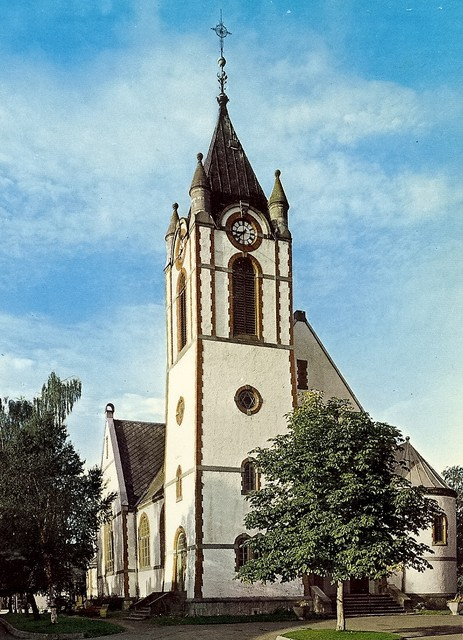
- View of the church
- Levanger Church
- 63.745189858°N 11.29558414°E
- Location: Levanger Municipality, Trøndelag
- Country: Norway
- Denomination: Church of Norway
- Churchmanship: Evangelical Lutheran

History
- Status: Parish church
- Founded: 11th century
- Consecrated: 24 Sept 1902

Architecture
- Functional status: Active
- Architect: Karl Norum
- Architectural type: Long church
- Style: Art Nouveau
- Completed: 1902 (124 years ago)

Specifications
- Capacity: 550
- Materials: Plastered brick

Administration
- Diocese: Nidaros bispedømme
- Deanery: Stiklestad prosti
- Parish: Levanger
- Norwegian Cultural Heritage Site
- Type: Church
- Status: Listed
- ID: 84295

Levanger Church (Norwegian: Levanger kirke) is a parish church of the Church of Norway in Levanger Municipality in Trøndelag county, Norway. The church is located in the town of Levanger, along the road Kirkegata. It is the main church for the Levanger parish which is part of the Stiklestad prosti (deanery) in the Diocese of Nidaros. The white, plastered brick church was built during 1902 in a long church design in an Art Nouveau style using plans drawn up by the architect Karl Norum (1852-1911). The church seats about 550 people.

== History ==
The earliest existing historical records of the church date back to the year 1432, but the church was likely built much earlier. In chapter 12 of the historical book Gunnlaugs saga ormstungu, an Icelandic saga, hints are given about a church in Levanger as Gunnlaug died after a fight and was buried by this church. The incidents took place around the year 1008. Thus, it is possible that a wooden church was built in Levanger around the year 1000. The first church was located on the same site as the present day church. Not much is known about that church. The existing historical records from the 1400s state that the church was a Romanesque stone church that was likely built around the year 1160. It had a rectangular nave with a narrower, rectangular chancel.

On 16 June 1692, the church was struck by lightning and all the wooden parts of the building burned down. Soon after the fire, the church was rebuilt and restored using the remaining stone walls. This effort was led by Ole Jonsen Hindrum. The church, like other Norwegian churches, was sold during the Norwegian church auction in the 1720s by the King of Denmark-Norway to pay debts from the Great Northern War. During this time of private ownership, the church suffered from poor maintenance to such an extent that the private owner was convicted of this in 1780. The congregation bought it back in 1782.

In 1868, the old church was torn down and a new wooden long church was built on the old foundations. The new church was designed by Håkon Mosling and it was completed in 1870, but unfortunately, it burned down in 1877 during a city-wide fire. Another wooden long church was built on the same foundation in 1880. That church had a Swiss chalet style and it was designed by Carl J. Bergstrøm. Unfortunately, that building burned down in 1897 during another city-wide fire. After that, a new plastered brick church was built on the same site and it was consecrated in 1902.

In 1952, the church received a new facelift for its 50th anniversary. From 1976-1982, the church underwent a complete restoration of the building. The altarpiece, baptismal font, and three chandeliers are from the previous church from 1870 which had burned down. The organ of the Levanger church was built by Br. Torkildsen Orgelbryggeri AS and was installed during 2003.

== Media gallery ==
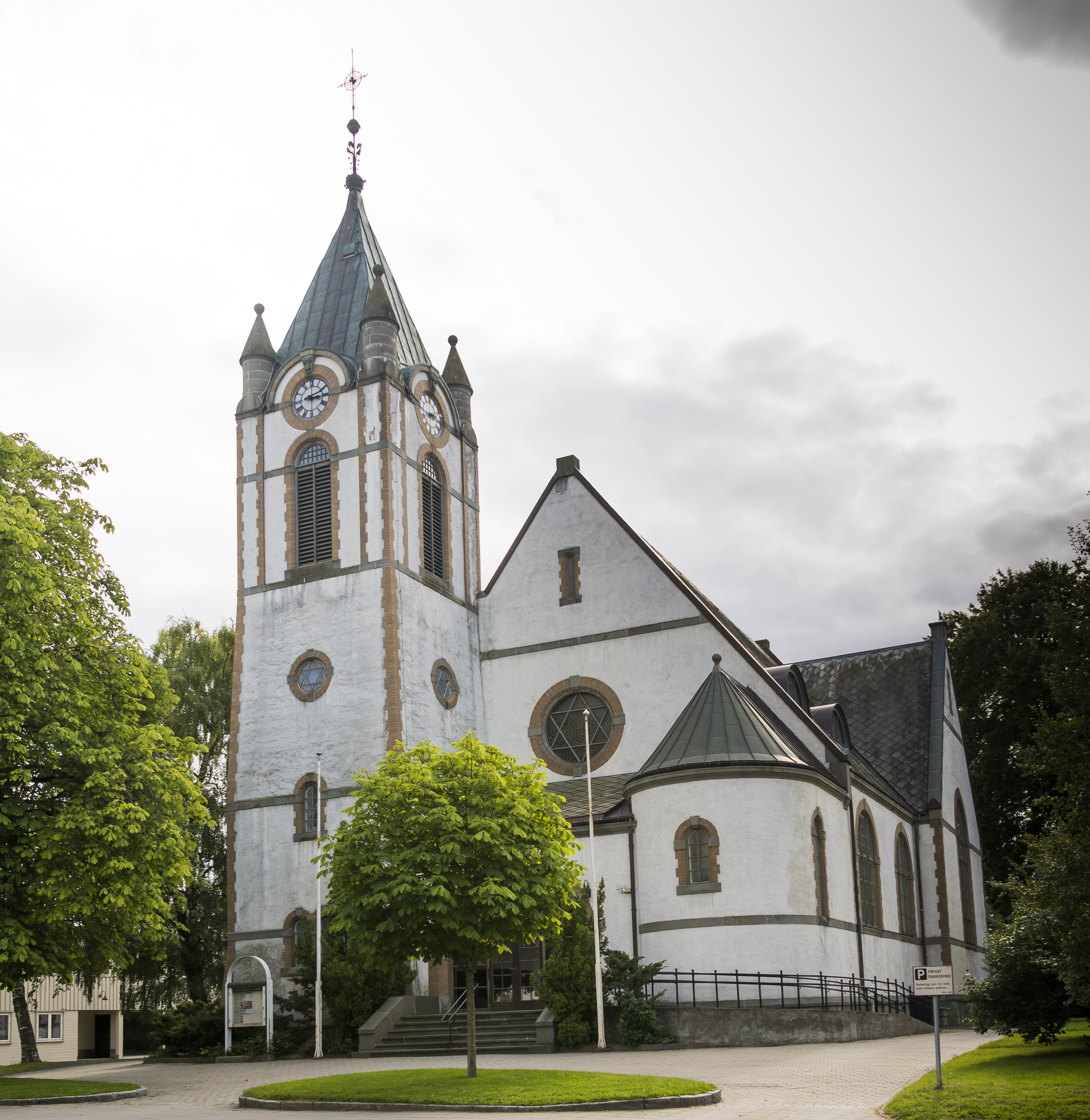
The front of the church in 2016

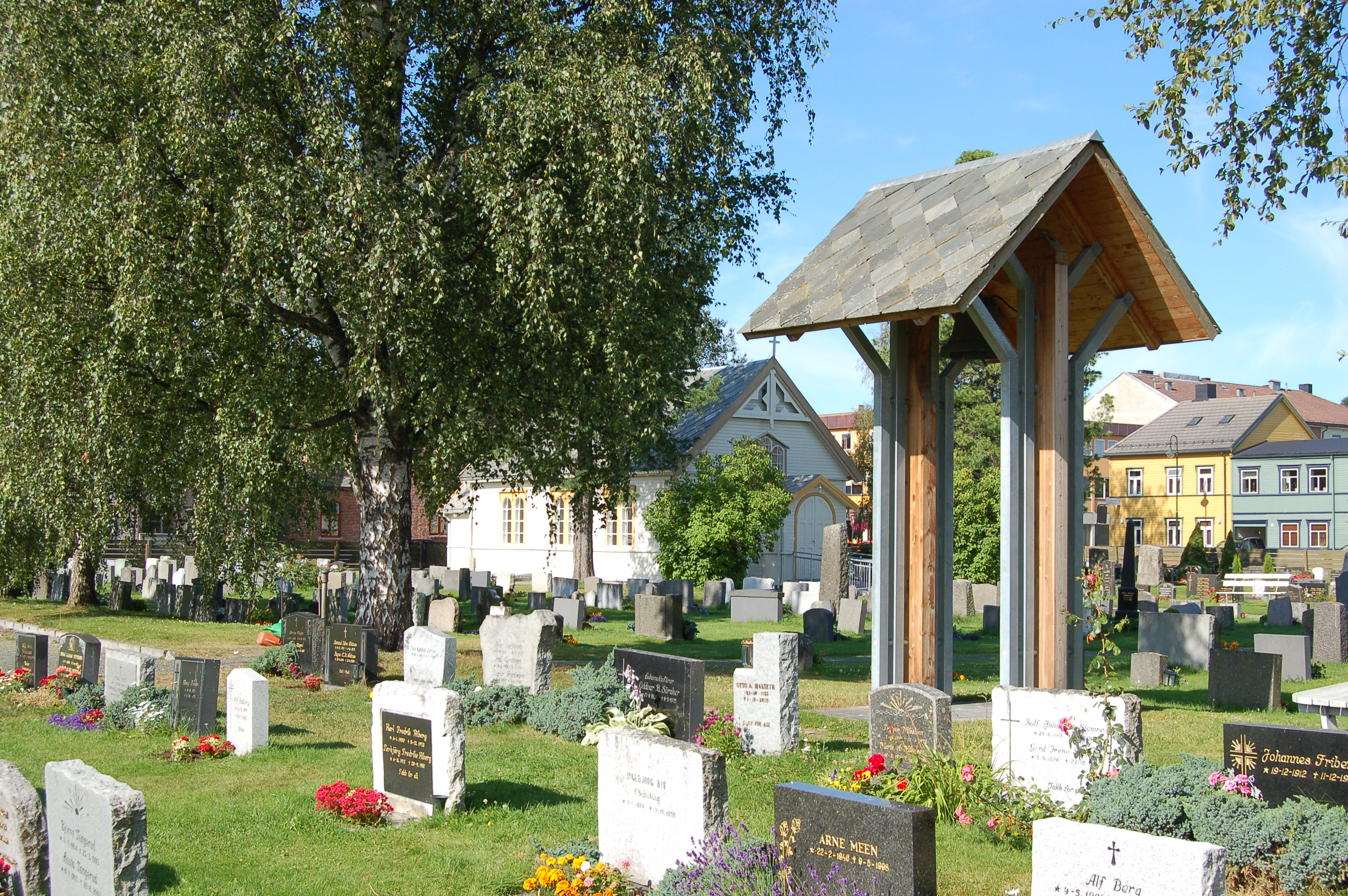
Church yard

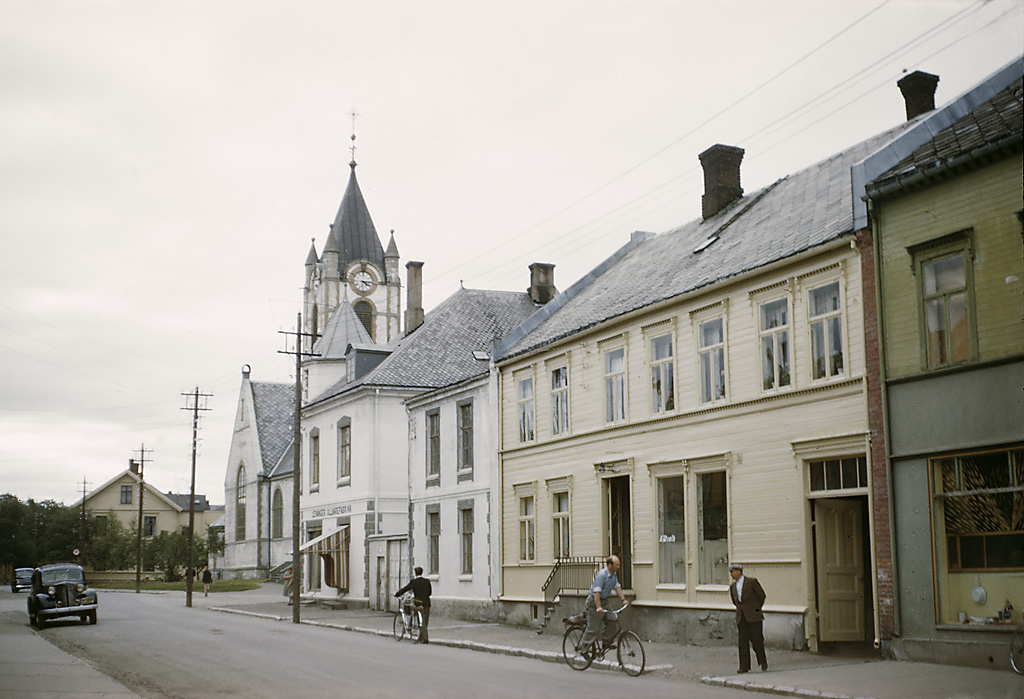
Church and the neighborhood

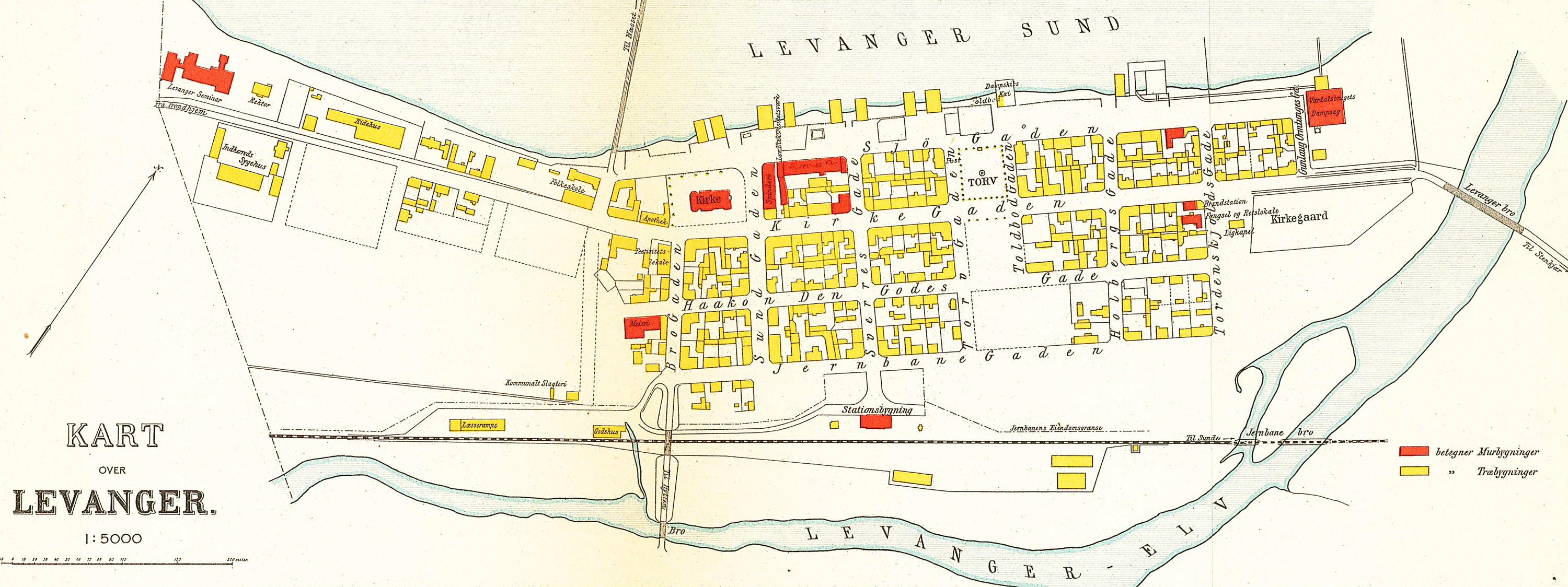
Levanger map from 1909. The church is the red building near the centre surrounded by an open yard.

== See also ==
- List of churches in Nidaros
