= Martin Stavrum =

Norwegian politician (1938–2022)

Martin Stavrum (23 June 1938, Levanger – 30 September 2022) was a Norwegian farmer and politician for the Centre Party.

He served as a deputy representative to the Parliament of Norway from Nord-Trøndelag during the term 1993–1997. In total he met during 7 days of parliamentary session. From 1992 to 1999 he was the mayor of Levanger Municipality. He died in September 2022.
