= Innherreds Kreditbank =

Innherreds Kreditbank was a Norwegian bank based in Steinkjer.

It was founded in 1887. People involved in the foundation were solicitor Halvor Bachke Guldahl, merchant and mayor I. W. Klüwer, Jakob Gram and businessman and politician Ananias Kleven. Guldahl was the first director of the bank. Jurist and mayor Arne Falstad was later a chairman of the board.

The bank faced economic hardships in the interwar period, and became defunct in 1932.
