= Levanger Municipality =

Municipality in Trøndelag, Norway

Levanger Municipality Levanger kommune Levangken tjïelte
- Municipality
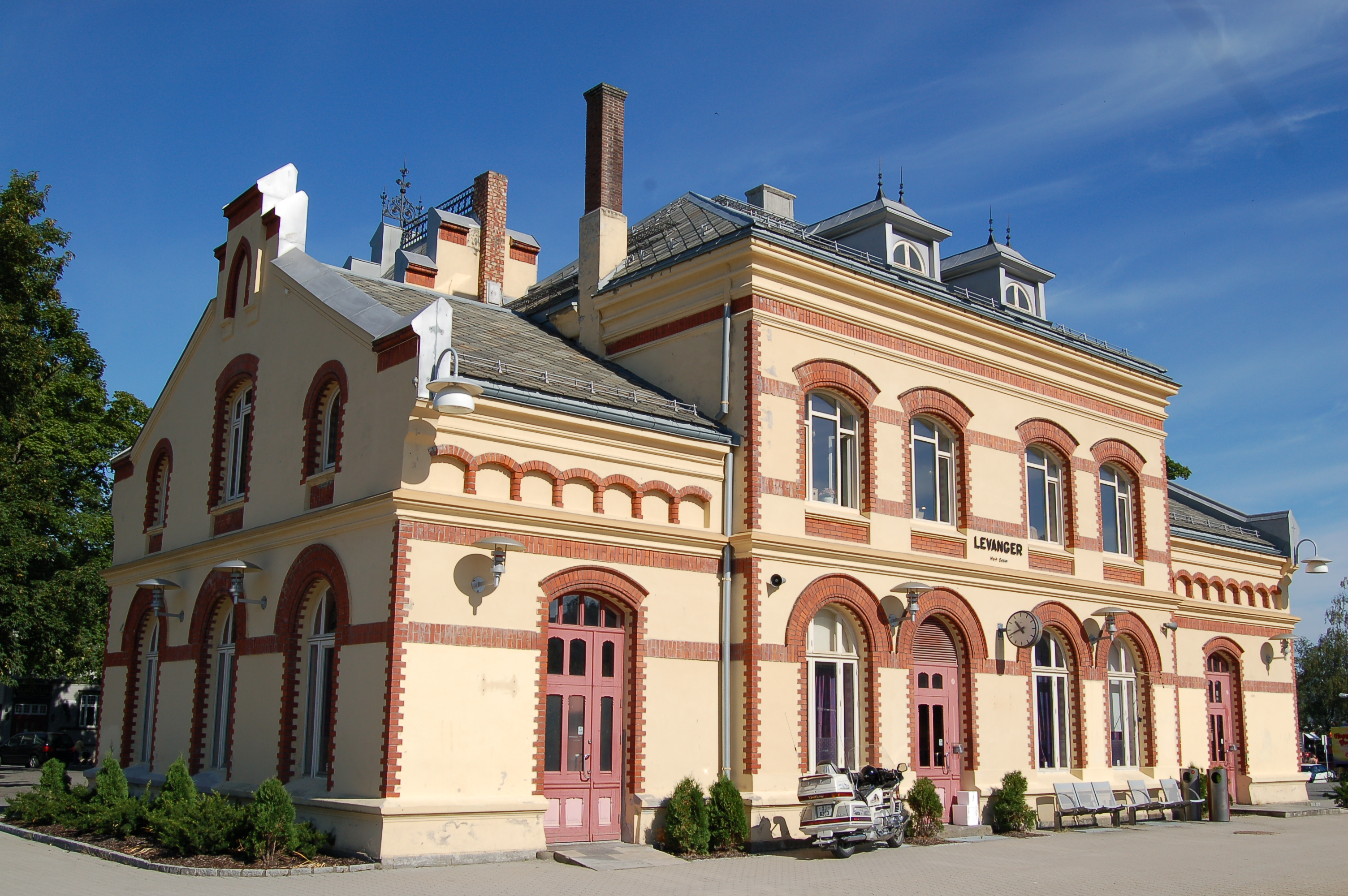

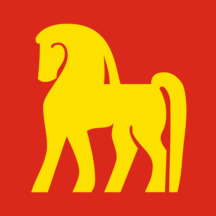
- Flag Coat of arms

- Trøndelag within Norway

- Levanger within Trøndelag
- Coordinates: 63°39′17″N 11°15′37″E
- Country: Norway
- County: Trøndelag
- District: Innherred
- Established: 1 Jan 1838
  - Created as: Formannskapsdistrikt
- Administrative centre: Levanger

Government
  - Mayor (2019): Anita Ravlo Sand (Sp)

Area
  - Total: 645.80 km^{2} (249.34 sq mi)
  - Land: 609.74 km^{2} (235.42 sq mi)
  - Water: 36.06 km^{2} (13.92 sq mi) 5.6%
  - Rank: #174 in Norway
- Highest elevation: 735.35 m (2,412.6 ft)

Population (2024)
  - Total: 20,574
  - Rank: #64 in Norway
  - Density: 31.9/km^{2} (83/sq mi)
  - Change (10 years): ▲ +7.1%
- Demonym: Levangsbygg

Official language
  - Norwegian form: Neutral
- Time zone: UTC+01:00 (CET)
  - Summer (DST): UTC+02:00 (CEST)
- ISO 3166 code: NO-5037
- Website: Official website

Levanger or Levangke (Southern Sami) is a municipality in Trøndelag county, Norway. It is part of the district of Innherred. The administrative centre of the municipality is the town of Levanger. Some of the notable villages in the municipality include Alstadhaug, Ekne, Hokstad, Markabygda, Momarka, Mule, Nesset, Okkenhaug, Ronglan, Skogn, and Åsen.

The town of Levanger lies at the mouth of the Levangselva river along the Trondheimsfjord. One of the main roads through the town is Kirkegata. The 5-square-kilometre (1.9 sq mi) town has a population (2024) of 10,813, meaning about half the municipal residents live in the town. The town has held "town status" as of 1997 and houses a campus of the Nord University as of 2016.

The 646-square-kilometre (249 sq mi) municipality is the 174th largest by area out of the 357 municipalities in Norway. Levanger Municipality is the 64th most populous municipality in Norway with a population of 20,574. The municipality's population density is 31.9 inhabitants per square kilometre (83/sq mi) and its population has increased by 7.1% over the previous 10-year period.

Levanger is a member of the Italian initiative, Cittaslow, for slow towns that don't adopt a "fast-lane" approach that is so common in most modern towns.

== General information ==
The town of Levanger (Norwegian: kjøpstad) was established as a municipality on 1 January 1838 (see formannskapsdistrikt law). Under the law, the town and the surrounding rural areas were supposed to be separate municipalities, but due to the low population of the town, this did not happen right away. In 1856, the town of Levanger (population: 1,017) and the rural areas surrounding the town (population: 2,290) were separated and the rural area became the rural municipality of Levanger landsogn (the name was later changed to Frol Municipality). On 13 November 1951, a small area of Frol Municipality (population: 51) was transferred to the town of Levanger.

During the 1960s, there were many municipal mergers across Norway due to the work of the Schei Committee.

- On 1 January 1962, the town of Levanger (population: 1,669) was merged with the neighboring Frol Municipality (population: 3,774), Åsen Municipality (population: 1,939), and Skogn Municipality (population: 4,756) to form a new, larger Levanger Municipality.
- Then, on 1 January 1964, Ytterøy Municipality (population: 772), a neighboring island municipality, was merged with the recently enlarged Levanger Municipality (population: 12,281) to form an even larger Levanger Municipality with 13,053 residents.

On 1 January 2018, the municipality switched from the old Nord-Trøndelag county to the new Trøndelag county.

=== Name ===
The municipality (originally the parish) is named after the old Levanger farm (Old Norse: Lifangr) since the first Levanger Church was built there. The first element is Lif which means "sheltered". The last element is angr which means "fjord".

On 16 February 2024, the national government approved a resolution to add a co-equal, official Sami language name for the municipality: Levangke. The spelling of the Sami language name changes depending on how it is used. It is called Levangke when it is spelled alone, but it is Levangken tjïelte when using the Sami language equivalent to "Levanger Municipality".

=== Coat of arms ===
The coat of arms was granted on 25 November 1960 as the arms of the town of Levanger. In 1962, the town was enlarged when three neighboring municipalities were merged with the town, creating a new, larger municipality of Levanger. The old arms of the town were adopted as the arms of the new municipality on 26 March 1965 (the old arms were chosen since none of the other municipalities had their own coats of arms). The official blazon is "Gules, a horse at bay Or" (Norwegian: På rød bunn en stående gull hest). This means the arms have a red field (background) and the charge is a horse. The horse has a tincture of Or which means it is commonly colored yellow, but if it is made out of metal, then gold is used. The horse is a symbol for the town as a major trading center between Sweden and Norway for many centuries. The arms were designed by Hallvard Trætteberg.

=== Churches ===
The Church of Norway has seven parishes (sokn) within Levanger Municipality. It is part of the Sør-Innherad prosti (deanery) in the Diocese of Nidaros.

Churches in Levanger Municipality
Parish (sokn)	Church name	Location of the church	Year built
Alstadhaug	Alstadhaug Church	Alstadhaug	c. 1180
Ekne	Ekne Church	Ekne	1893
Levanger	Levanger Church	Levanger	1902
Levanger	Bamberg Church	Nesset	1998
Markabygd	Markabygda Church	Markabygda	1887
Okkenhaug	Okkenhaug Church	Okkenhaug	1893
Ytterøy	Ytterøy Church	Ytterøya	1890
Åsen	Åsen Church	Åsen	1904

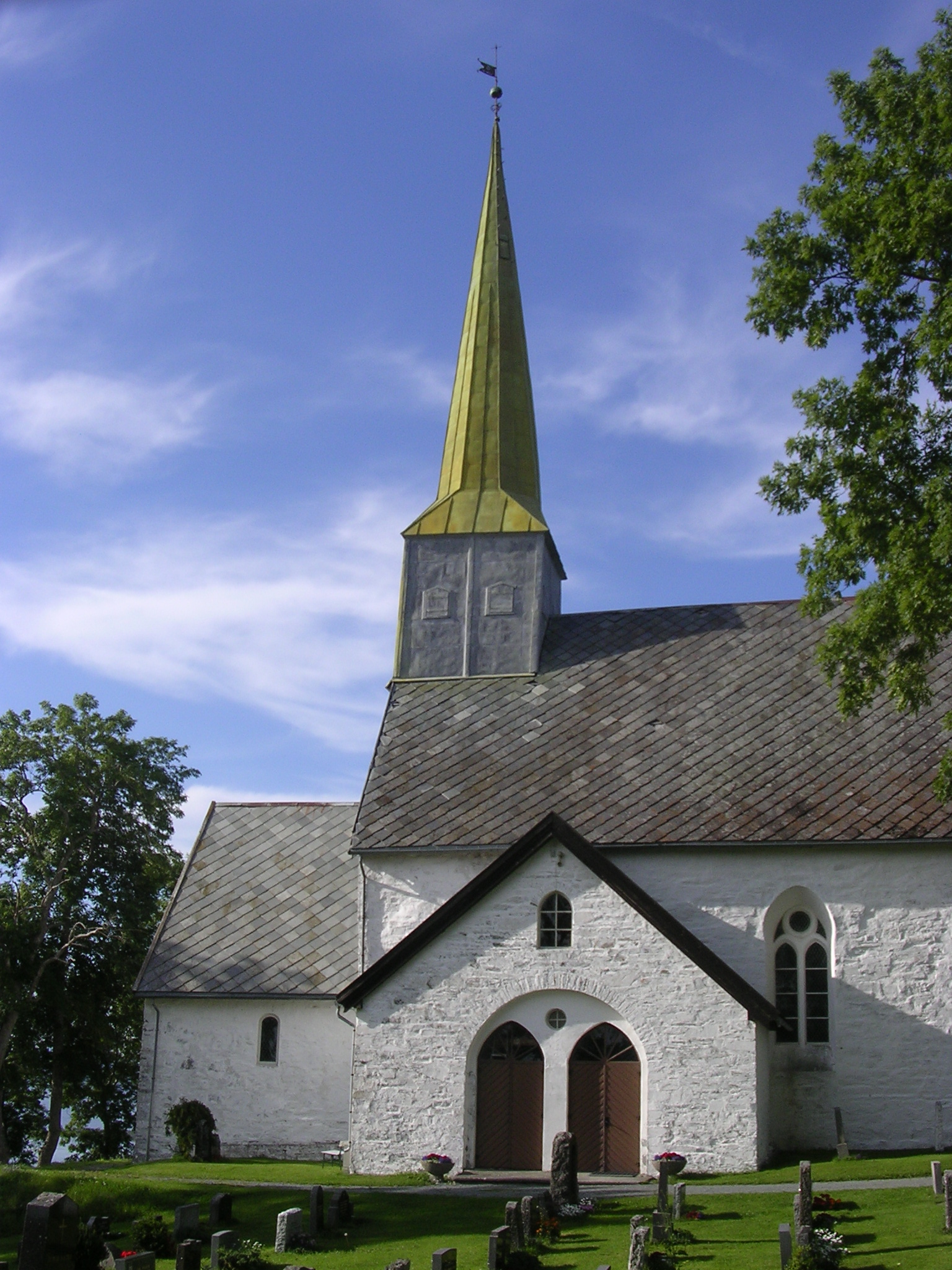
Alstadhaug Church

== History ==
Levanger can probably be traced back to the Iron Age, and with certainty back to the Viking Age. Alvshaugen (from the Old Norse word haugr meaning mound) is a large burial mound located in the middle of the cemetery at Alstadhaug Church. The burial mound has been dated to 300–600 CE. It is about 40 metres (130 ft) in diameter, and about 5 to 6 metres (16 to 20 ft) tall.

The name "Levanger" is listed in Gunnlaugs saga ormstungu. The historic town site was located in a place somewhat different from the current town center, probably in relation to the Halsstein bygdeborg (hill fort). In the Middle Ages, the area now part of the municipality of Levanger was part of the county of Skeyna in the traditional district of Innherred. The county was ruled by earls who resided at the manor of Geite, situated on a hill nearby the present town. The county was divided into six parishes: Ekne, Alstadhaug, Levanger, Frol, Ytterøy, and Leksvik. The county church was Alstadhaug Church, which also contained the fylking, while Levanger was the main port and market town. Not much is known about the earls of Skeyna, as few documents still exist that document their existence. The Reformation and the Danish occupation of Norway in 1537 caused the Norwegian nobility to disintegrate, and the last earl was most likely executed during the Reformation. The Danish rulers united Skeyna with four other counties in Innherred, creating the county of Steinvikholm. Later, the Levanger area was part of Trondhjems amt which was later divided in Nordre Trondhjems amt. That was later renamed Nord-Trøndelag fylke. On 1 January 2018, the municipality switched from the old Nord-Trøndelag county to the new Trøndelag county.

=== Town ===
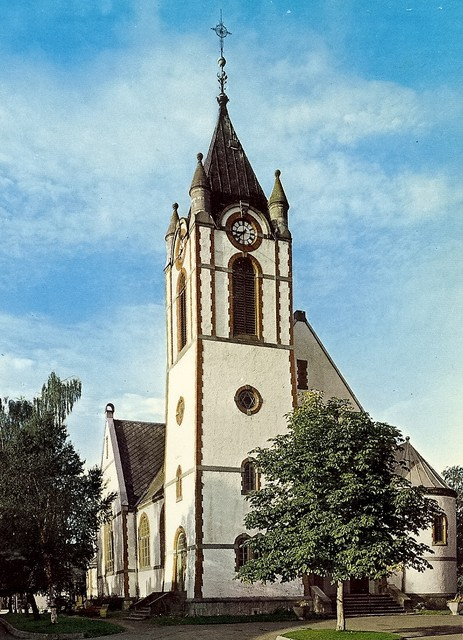
Levanger Church

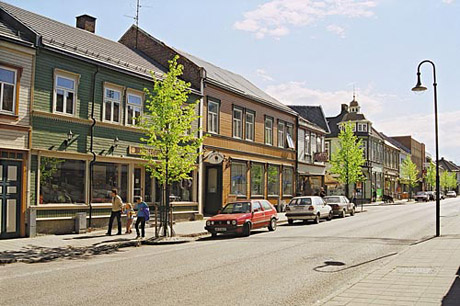
View of the houses along the Kirkegata

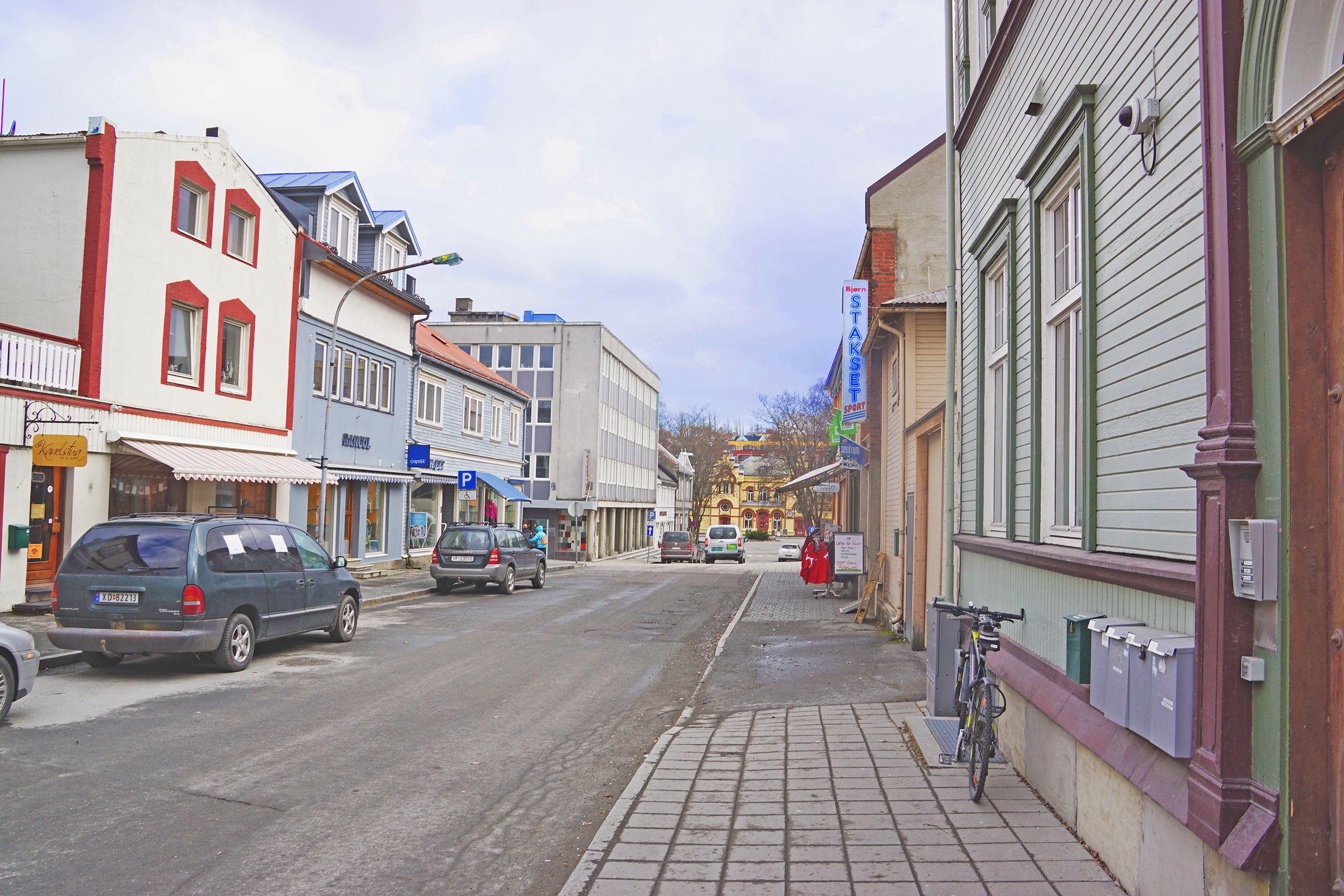
View of Sverres gate in Levanger towards the railway station

The town of Levanger was founded by King Charles XIV John of Sweden on 18 May 1836 as a kjøpstad, on the site where the village of Levanger already existed. The village had expanded from the traditional winter fair, known as the marsimartnan (lit. the St. Marcus Market of Levanger), dating back to the 13th century. In October 1836, as the town's borders set, Commissioner Mons Lie proposed that "the town shall bear the name of Carlslevanger, so the name of this ancient soil can be united with that of the new town's glorious founder". Despite the suggestion's being refused, the town protocols spoke of Carlslevanger Stad instead of Kjøpstaden Levanger until 1838. In 1838, the formannskapsdistrikt law classified this town as a ladested or port town.

The inhabitants of Levanger were not prepared for becoming a town, and so it took a long time before the town was constituted. In these early days the town was ruled by the Foged (Royal rural administrator). At that time there were already established a trade organization, "Levangerpatrisiatet", from 1695, based on the market. But only citizens of Trondheim could be members, until Levanger became a town in its own right. In 1839, the first guild of the town was established, and in the following years several new trades and craftsmen settled in the town.

In 1841, the first official elections were held, and Hans Nicolai Grønn was elected the first mayor of the town. Two years later, the town got its first water-pipe system, its first two primitive street lamps and a town hall.

The fire-security report of 1844 clearly confirmed the great risk of disastrous fire in the town's narrow lanes; all houses were wooden houses. Therefore, the mayor hired Major Johannes Mathias Sejersted (1797–1886) to make a general report and draw up a new regulation plan, showing Levanger as a more "continental" town. And already in 1846, two years later the town was nearly totally ruined by a great fire. Sejersted's regulation plan was used when the town was rebuilt. Levanger was damaged by two great fires after that time, in 1877 and 1897, but each time the town has been rebuilt as a wooden town, and still today most houses are wooden houses.

Throughout the 19th century, the famous market's economical importance faded out, and the ancient arrangement was reduced to a tradition without much content. That was the end of Levanger as an important port of foreign trade between Sweden and Norway. However, in the early 20th century, the town of Levanger was pleased by new establishments such as county hospital and college of education. The German occupation in 1940 was the beginning of a 40-year-long "interregnum" of the traditional "Marsimartnan".

In 1961, the town of Levanger decided to merge with its neighbors. On 1 January 1962, Frol Municipality, Skogn Municipality, and Åsen Municipality were merged with Levanger, and at the same time, it lost its "town status". The neighboring Ytterøy Municipality was merged with Levanger two years later.

Over thirty years later, in 1997, as a result of the resurrection of the "Marsimartnan" in 1989, the town of Levanger was re-established, though the town still is part of Levanger municipality. But the center of administration is to be found in the town of Levanger, which is also, in historical terms, the administrative basis for the municipality. And Levanger's town traditions and culture go way back. The town is laid out according to an urban and regulated plot with proper streets such as Kirkegata. It's more than just a town hall and a city square. In fact, Levanger's always been a town, though not always officially, and every inhabitant in the town area carries this piece of knowledge with pride. Thus there does exist a sense of distinction between town people and the people from the countryside.

In 2002, Levanger joined the Cittaslow movement, although there have been some violations of the Cittaslow charter, of which can be mentioned the construction of the unharmonic new mini mall in Sjøgata, down by the seaside. This mini mall includes two grocery stores and several electrical appliances stores.

== Government ==
Levanger Municipality is responsible for primary education (through 10th grade), outpatient health services, senior citizen services, welfare and other social services, zoning, economic development, and municipal roads and utilities. The municipality is governed by a municipal council of directly elected representatives. The mayor is indirectly elected by a vote of the municipal council. The municipality is under the jurisdiction of the Trøndelag District Court and the Frostating Court of Appeal.

Levanger's waste management has since 1985 been carried out by the intermunicipal Innherred Renovasjon. They operate a major recycling center at Mule, previously a landfill. Since 2018, waste collection has been operated by ReTrans Midt.

=== Municipal council ===
The municipal council (Kommunestyre) of Levanger Municipality is made up of 35 representatives that are elected every four years. The tables below show the current and historical composition of the council by political party.

Levanger kommunestyre 2023–2027
Party name (in Norwegian)	Number of representatives
Labour Party (Arbeiderpartiet)	10
Progress Party (Fremskrittspartiet)	2
Green Party (Miljøpartiet De Grønne)	1
Conservative Party (Høyre)	6
Industry and Business Party (Industri‑ og Næringspartiet)	1
Christian Democratic Party (Kristelig Folkeparti)	2
Pensioners' Party (Pensjonistpartiet)	1
Red Party (Rødt)	1
Centre Party (Senterpartiet)	7
Socialist Left Party (Sosialistisk Venstreparti)	3
Liberal Party (Venstre)	1
Total number of members:	35

Levanger kommunestyre 2019–2023
Party name (in Norwegian)	Number of representatives
Labour Party (Arbeiderpartiet)	11
Progress Party (Fremskrittspartiet)	2
Green Party (Miljøpartiet De Grønne)	1
Conservative Party (Høyre)	3
Christian Democratic Party (Kristelig Folkeparti)	2
Red Party (Rødt)	1
Centre Party (Senterpartiet)	11
Socialist Left Party (Sosialistisk Venstreparti)	3
Liberal Party (Venstre)	1
Total number of members:	35

Levanger kommunestyre 2015–2019
Party name (in Norwegian)	Number of representatives
Labour Party (Arbeiderpartiet)	17
Progress Party (Fremskrittspartiet)	2
Green Party (Miljøpartiet De Grønne)	1
Conservative Party (Høyre)	3
Christian Democratic Party (Kristelig Folkeparti)	2
Centre Party (Senterpartiet)	6
Socialist Left Party (Sosialistisk Venstreparti)	2
Liberal Party (Venstre)	2
Total number of members:	35

Levanger kommunestyre 2011–2015
Party name (in Norwegian)	Number of representatives
Labour Party (Arbeiderpartiet)	16
Progress Party (Fremskrittspartiet)	3
Conservative Party (Høyre)	5
Christian Democratic Party (Kristelig Folkeparti)	2
Centre Party (Senterpartiet)	5
Socialist Left Party (Sosialistisk Venstreparti)	2
Liberal Party (Venstre)	2
Total number of members:	35

Levanger kommunestyre 2007–2011
Party name (in Norwegian)	Number of representatives
Labour Party (Arbeiderpartiet)	13
Progress Party (Fremskrittspartiet)	4
Conservative Party (Høyre)	3
Christian Democratic Party (Kristelig Folkeparti)	2
Centre Party (Senterpartiet)	6
Socialist Left Party (Sosialistisk Venstreparti)	4
Liberal Party (Venstre)	3
Total number of members:	35

Levanger kommunestyre 2003–2007
Party name (in Norwegian)	Number of representatives
Labour Party (Arbeiderpartiet)	10
Progress Party (Fremskrittspartiet)	4
Conservative Party (Høyre)	4
Christian Democratic Party (Kristelig Folkeparti)	3
Centre Party (Senterpartiet)	6
Socialist Left Party (Sosialistisk Venstreparti)	6
Liberal Party (Venstre)	2
Total number of members:	35

Levanger kommunestyre 1999–2003
Party name (in Norwegian)	Number of representatives
Labour Party (Arbeiderpartiet)	16
Progress Party (Fremskrittspartiet)	4
Conservative Party (Høyre)	7
Christian Democratic Party (Kristelig Folkeparti)	6
Centre Party (Senterpartiet)	10
Socialist Left Party (Sosialistisk Venstreparti)	7
Liberal Party (Venstre)	3
Total number of members:	53

Levanger kommunestyre 1995–1999
Party name (in Norwegian)	Number of representatives
Labour Party (Arbeiderpartiet)	17
Progress Party (Fremskrittspartiet)	3
Conservative Party (Høyre)	5
Christian Democratic Party (Kristelig Folkeparti)	4
Centre Party (Senterpartiet)	15
Socialist Left Party (Sosialistisk Venstreparti)	6
Liberal Party (Venstre)	3
Total number of members:	53

Levanger kommunestyre 1991–1995
Party name (in Norwegian)	Number of representatives
Labour Party (Arbeiderpartiet)	17
Progress Party (Fremskrittspartiet)	1
Conservative Party (Høyre)	5
Christian Democratic Party (Kristelig Folkeparti)	4
Centre Party (Senterpartiet)	15
Socialist Left Party (Sosialistisk Venstreparti)	9
Liberal Party (Venstre)	2
Total number of members:	53

Levanger kommunestyre 1987–1991
Party name (in Norwegian)	Number of representatives
Labour Party (Arbeiderpartiet)	20
Progress Party (Fremskrittspartiet)	3
Conservative Party (Høyre)	7
Christian Democratic Party (Kristelig Folkeparti)	4
Centre Party (Senterpartiet)	10
Socialist Left Party (Sosialistisk Venstreparti)	5
Liberal Party (Venstre)	4
Total number of members:	53

Levanger kommunestyre 1983–1987
Party name (in Norwegian)	Number of representatives
Labour Party (Arbeiderpartiet)	22
Conservative Party (Høyre)	8
Christian Democratic Party (Kristelig Folkeparti)	5
Centre Party (Senterpartiet)	9
Socialist Left Party (Sosialistisk Venstreparti)	3
Liberal Party (Venstre)	5
Total number of members:	53

Levanger kommunestyre 1979–1983
Party name (in Norwegian)	Number of representatives
Labour Party (Arbeiderpartiet)	20
Conservative Party (Høyre)	7
Christian Democratic Party (Kristelig Folkeparti)	5
New People's Party (Nye Folkepartiet)	1
Centre Party (Senterpartiet)	10
Socialist Left Party (Sosialistisk Venstreparti)	2
Liberal Party (Venstre)	6
Independents List (Uavhengig liste)	2
Total number of members:	53

Levanger kommunestyre 1975–1979
Party name (in Norwegian)	Number of representatives
Labour Party (Arbeiderpartiet)	19
Conservative Party (Høyre)	5
Christian Democratic Party (Kristelig Folkeparti)	6
New People's Party (Nye Folkepartiet)	1
Centre Party (Senterpartiet)	13
Socialist Left Party (Sosialistisk Venstreparti)	2
Liberal Party (Venstre)	5
Independents List (Uavhengig liste)	2
Total number of members:	53

Levanger kommunestyre 1971–1975
Party name (in Norwegian)	Number of representatives
Labour Party (Arbeiderpartiet)	23
Conservative Party (Høyre)	4
Christian Democratic Party (Kristelig Folkeparti)	6
Centre Party (Senterpartiet)	12
Liberal Party (Venstre)	6
Local List(s) (Lokale lister)	1
Socialist common list (Venstresosialistiske felleslister)	1
Total number of members:	53

Levanger kommunestyre 1967–1971
Party name (in Norwegian)	Number of representatives
Labour Party (Arbeiderpartiet)	23
Conservative Party (Høyre)	5
Christian Democratic Party (Kristelig Folkeparti)	6
Centre Party (Senterpartiet)	11
Socialist People's Party (Sosialistisk Folkeparti)	1
Liberal Party (Venstre)	6
Local List(s) (Lokale lister)	1
Total number of members:	53

Levanger kommunestyre 1963–1967
Party name (in Norwegian)	Number of representatives
Labour Party (Arbeiderpartiet)	24
Conservative Party (Høyre)	5
Christian Democratic Party (Kristelig Folkeparti)	5
Centre Party (Senterpartiet)	12
Liberal Party (Venstre)	5
Local List(s) (Lokale lister)	2
Total number of members:	53

Levanger bystyre 1959–1963
Party name (in Norwegian)	Number of representatives
Labour Party (Arbeiderpartiet)	9
Conservative Party (Høyre)	8
Christian Democratic Party (Kristelig Folkeparti)	1
Liberal Party (Venstre)	3
Total number of members:	21

Levanger bystyre 1955–1959
Party name (in Norwegian)	Number of representatives
Labour Party (Arbeiderpartiet)	9
Conservative Party (Høyre)	7
Liberal Party (Venstre)	5
Total number of members:	21

Levanger bystyre 1951–1955
Party name (in Norwegian)	Number of representatives
Labour Party (Arbeiderpartiet)	8
Conservative Party (Høyre)	7
Liberal Party (Venstre)	5
Total number of members:	20

Levanger bystyre 1947–1951
Party name (in Norwegian)	Number of representatives
Labour Party (Arbeiderpartiet)	8
Conservative Party (Høyre)	6
Communist Party (Kommunistiske Parti)	2
Christian Democratic Party (Kristelig Folkeparti)	1
Liberal Party (Venstre)	3
Total number of members:	20

Levanger bystyre 1945–1947
Party name (in Norwegian)	Number of representatives
Labour Party (Arbeiderpartiet)	8
Conservative Party (Høyre)	3
Communist Party (Kommunistiske Parti)	1
Liberal Party (Venstre)	3
Local List(s) (Lokale lister)	5
Total number of members:	20

Levanger bystyre 1937–1941*
Party name (in Norwegian)	Number of representatives
Labour Party (Arbeiderpartiet)	9
Free-minded People's Party (Frisinnede Folkeparti)	3
Conservative Party (Høyre)	4
Liberal Party (Venstre)	4
Total number of members:	20
Note: Due to the German occupation of Norway during World War II, no elections were held for new municipal councils until after the war ended in 1945.

Levanger bystyre 1934–1937
Party name (in Norwegian)	Number of representatives
Labour Party (Arbeiderpartiet)	7
Free-minded People's Party (Frisinnede Folkeparti)	2
Conservative Party (Høyre)	5
Nasjonal Samling Party (Nasjonal Samling)	1
Liberal Party (Venstre)	5
Total number of members:	20

=== Mayors ===
The mayor (Norwegian: ordfører) of Levanger Municipality is the political leader of the municipality and the chairperson of the municipal council. The first mayor was not elected until 1841, three years after the establishment of the town. In the interim, it was governed by an appointed administrator. Here is a list of people who have held the position of mayor:

- 1841–1841: Hans Nicolai Grønn
- 1841–1842: Magnus Henrich Linde
- 1843–1845: Andreas Krogness
- 1846–1848: Hans J. Engelsen
- 1849–1849: Christian Hauan
- 1850–1853: Hans J. Engelsen
- 1854–1854: Ole Eide
- 1855–1855: Ulrich L. Elsæther
- 1856–1856: Hans J. Engelsen
- 1857–1857: Tobias Müller
- 1858–1861: Ingvald Marillus Emil Smith
- 1862–1863: Andreas Kjølstad
- 1864–1867: Andreas Hansen
- 1868–1870: Albert Lassen
- 1871–1871: Rascanus Tonning
- 1872–1872: Anton Christian Aas
- 1873–1873: Rascanus Tonning
- 1874–1874: Ole E. Stendahl
- 1875–1875: Johannes Bye
- 1876–1876: Johan Christian Grønn
- 1877–1877: Ole E. Stendahl
- 1878–1879: Rascanus Tonning
- 1880–1880: Johan Christian Grønn
- 1881–1881: Bertram Martinus Bratsberg
- 1882–1883: Johan Christian Grønn (V)
- 1884–1887: Peter Følling (V)
- 1888–1888: Johan Christian Grønn (V)
- 1889–1889: Paul Edvart Støre (H)
- 1890–1890: Johan Christian Grønn (V)
- 1891–1891: Paul Edvart Støre (H)
- 1892–1892: Peter Følling (V)
- 1893–1893: Emanuel Aagaard (H)
- 1894–1894: Peter Følling (V)
- 1895–1895: Paul Edvart Støre (H)
- 1896–1896: Peter Følling (V)
- 1897–1897: Paul Edvart Støre (H)
- 1898–1899: Peter Følling (V)
- 1900–1900: Paul Edvart Støre (H)
- 1901–1901: Otto Christian Hiorth (H)
- 1902–1902: Peder Martin Bragstad (V)
- 1903–1906: Otto Christian Hiorth (H)
- 1906–1908: Hans Svebak (AvH)
- 1909–1910: Peder Martin Bragstad (V)
- 1911–1911: Hans Svebak (AvH)
- 1912–1914: Hans Buck (H)
- 1915–1918: Halfdan Harnoll (H)
- 1918–1919: Richard Ausen (V)
- 1920–1922: Anton Salberg (H)
- 1923–1923: Peder Martin Bragstad (V)
- 1924–1924: Ola Karlgård (V)
- 1925–1925: Ingvald Bleken (H)
- 1926–1926: Paul Holthe (Ap)
- 1927–1927: Svein O. Øraker (Ap)
- 1928–1928: Samuel Thomassen (V)
- 1929–1930: Svein O. Øraker (Ap)
- 1931–1932: Arne Falstad (H)
- 1933–1933: Lauritz Øyen (FV)
- 1934–1934: Samuel Thomassen (V)
- 1935–1935: Arne Falstad (H)
- 1936–1937: Valentin Rosenlund (FV)
- 1938–1939: Jardar Wold (Ap)
- 1940–1940: Arne Falstad (H)
- 1941–1941: Kaare Landfald (H)
- 1941–1943: Almar Næss (NS)
- 1943–1945: Arne Seljelid (NS)
- 1945–1945: Arne Falstad (H)
- 1946–1946: Svein O. Øraker (Ap)
- 1947–1947: Jardar Wold (Ap)
- 1948–1949: Kaare Landfald (H)
- 1950–1951: Jardar Wold (Ap)
- 1952–1953: Valentin Rosenlund (H)
- 1954–1954: Jardar Wold (Ap)
- 1955–1955: Valentin Rosenlund (H)
- 1956–1961: Reidar Strømsøe (H)
- 1962–1967: Einar Fostad (Sp)
- 1967–1971: Reidar Due (Sp)
- 1972–1975: Jarle Haugan (V)
- 1976–1979: Jon Ramstad (Sp)
- 1980–1991: Jarle Haugan (V)
- 1992–1999: Martin Stavrum (Sp)
- 1999–2007: Odd-Eiliv Thraning (Ap)
- 2007–2019: Robert Svarva (Ap)
- 2019–present: Anita Ravlo Sand (Sp)

== Economy ==
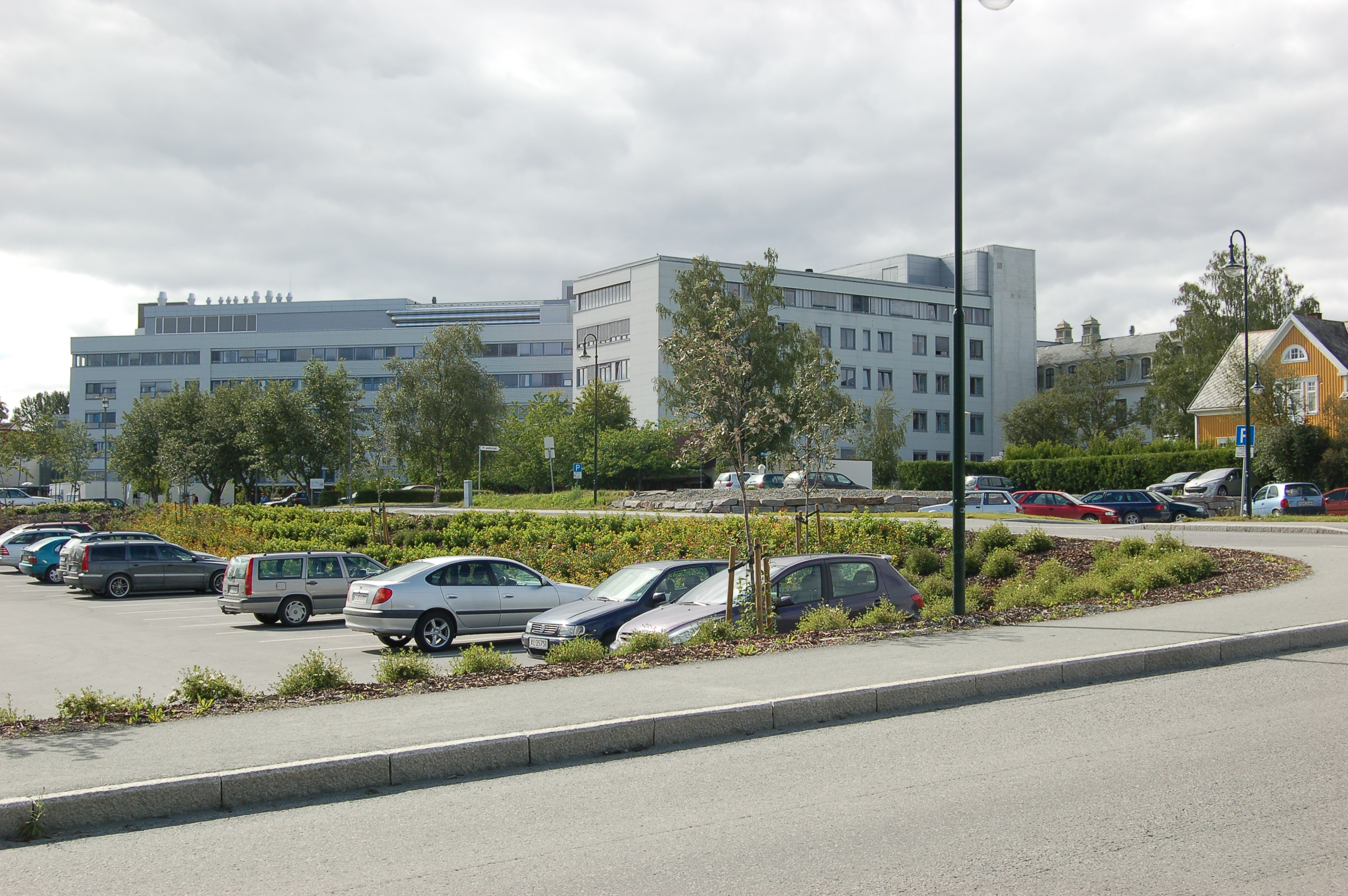
Levanger Hospital

The world's largest paper-producing company, Norske Skog, built its first ever factory in Skogn, south of the town of Levanger. This factory started production in 1966, is working today, and it provides 530 jobs at the plant, and an additional 1,900 jobs in transportation and forestry. Levanger encompasses some of the best agricultural areas in Trøndelag. The Fiborgtangen industrial area is located in Skogn and has freight access to the Nordland Line.

Most of the town's commercial area is concentrated around the main street, called Kirkegata (Church Street), and in more recent years around the shopping mall Magneten, located at the suburban area of Moan. Magneten has since its beginning faced rapid growth, and several stores earlier located in Kirkegata have now moved to Moan and/or Magneten. The Inntrøndelag District Court is also located in the town. The Levanger Hospital and the Nord University also are major employers in the municipality.

== Transportation ==
The main street of the town of Levanger has roads connecting to the E6 highway at both ends and the Norwegian County Road 774 at the north end which connects to the Levanger–Hokstad Ferry, which regularly runs between the town of Levanger and the island of Ytterøya in the Trondheimsfjord.

The Nordland Line runs to the north through the municipality. It stops at the following stations: Åsen Station, HiNT Station, Ronglan Station, Skogn Station, and Levanger Station. The train used to stop at Levanger Hospital at the Innherred Sykehus Station, but that station is now closed.

== Geography ==
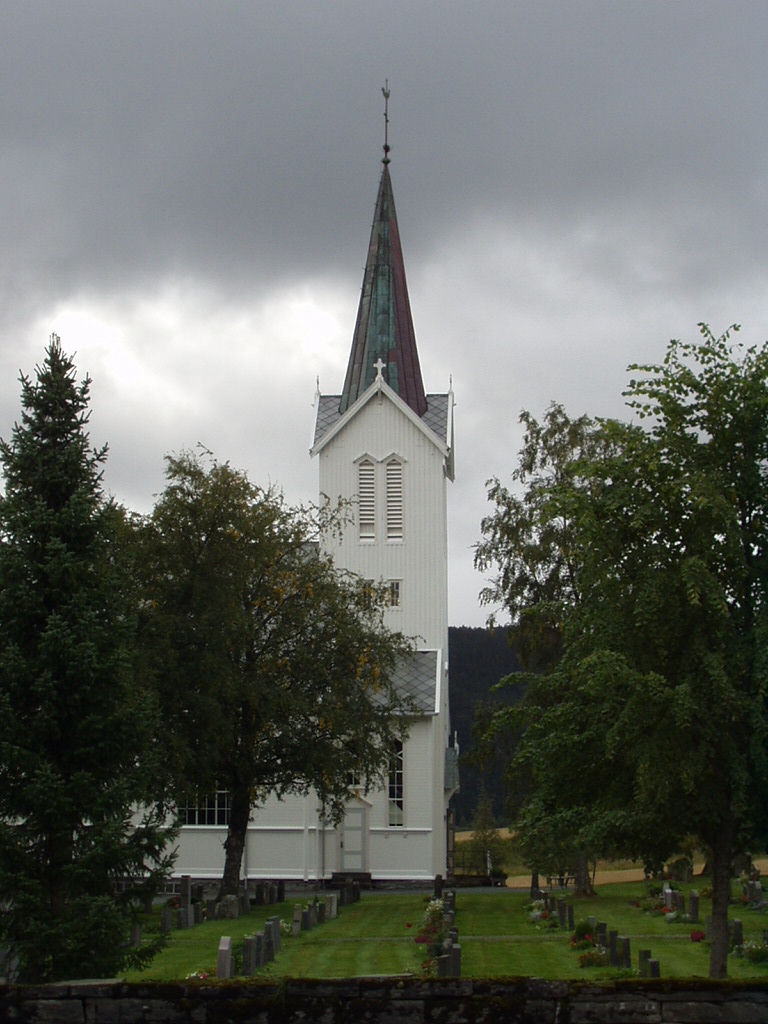
Åsen Church

The municipality is located in the Innherred region of Trøndelag county. It lies on the eastern shore of the Trondheimsfjord and it includes the island of Ytterøya. There are many lakes in the municipality, including Byavatnet, Feren, Hammervatnet, Hoklingen, Movatnet, and Sønningen. The Levangselva river runs through the municipality. The Rinnleiret beach area lies on the Levanger–Verdal border. The highest point in the municipality is the 735.35-metre (2,412.6 ft) tall mountain Hårskallen.

== Attractions ==
- Alvshaugen burial mound at Alstadhaug
- Alstadhaug Medieval church (next to Alvshaugen burial mound)
- Brusve Museum
- Falstad Center
- Falstad concentration camp
- Fenka art gallery
- Hveding Auto Museum
- Munkeby Abbey ruins
- Halsteinen hillfort
- The Iron to Viking Age gravemounds at Gjeite

== Notable people ==
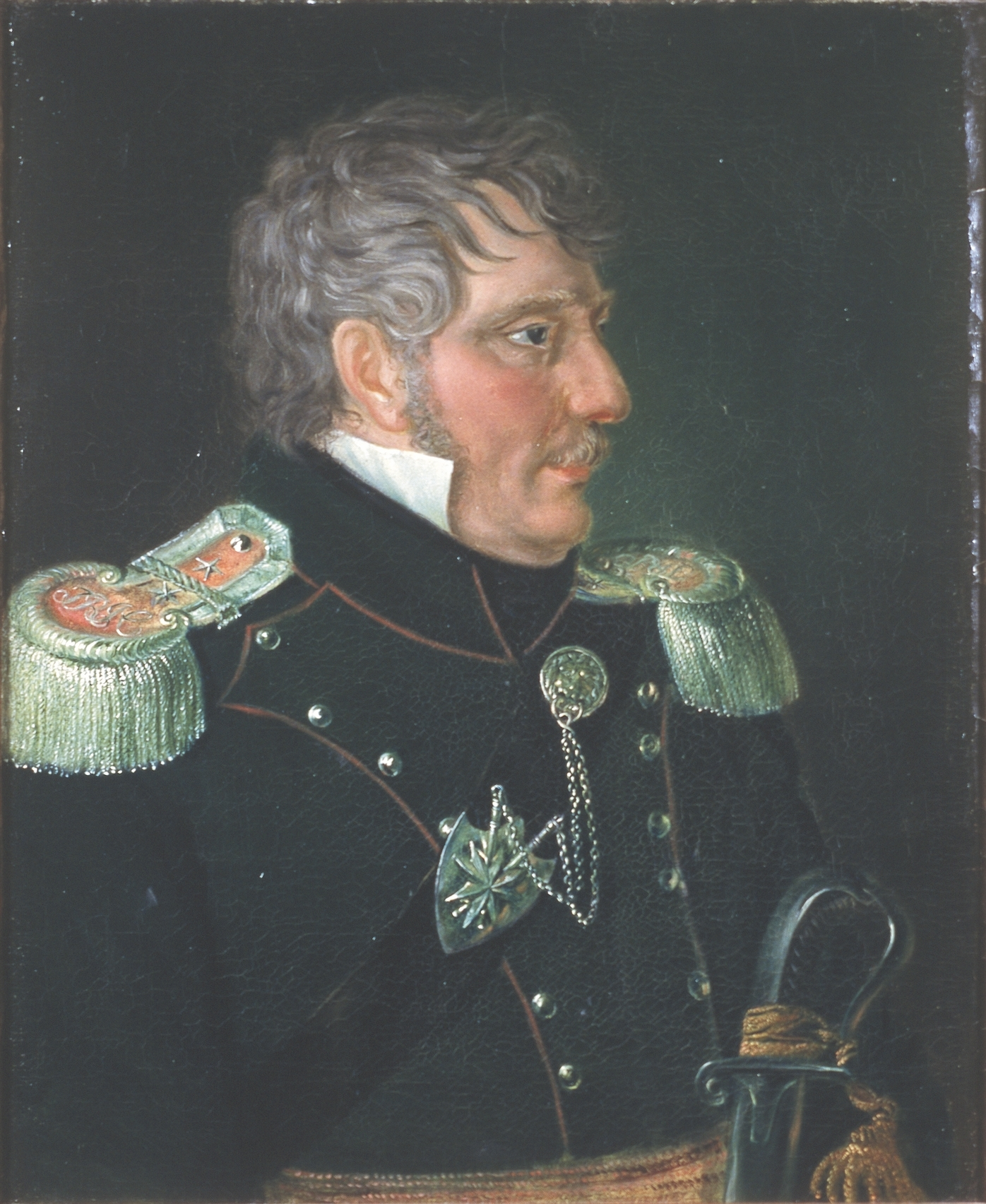
Frederik Heidmann, 1851

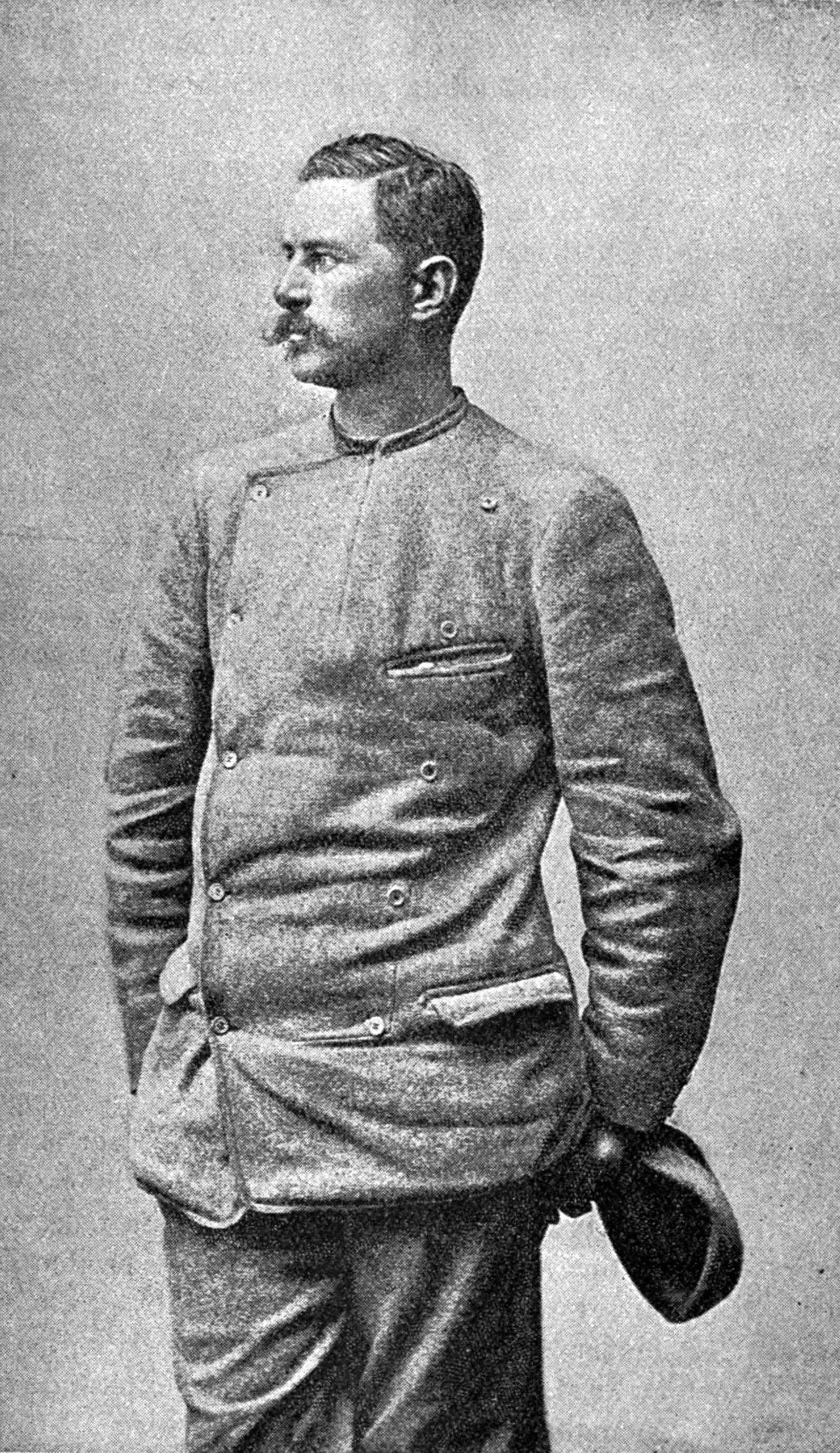
Oluf Christian Dietrichson, 1890

=== Public service and public thinking ===
- Frederik Heidmann (1777 in Skogn – 1850), a military officer, civil servant, and politician
- Oluf Christian Dietrichson (1856 in Skogn – 1942), a polar explorer and military officer
- Peter August Poppe (1870 in Skogn – 1933), an engineer, designer, and developer of engines and complete motor vehicles for the British motor industry
- Arne Falstad (1874 at Skjerpengen – 1958), an attorney, banker, and Mayor of Levanger in the 1930s
- Albert Fredrik Eggen (1878 at Østborg – 1966), a farmer, politician, and pre-WWII Mayor of Stod
- Helge Klæstad (1885–1965), a Norwegian judge and Supreme Court Justice from 1929-1946
- Bjarne Skard (1896 in Levanger – 1961), the Bishop of Tunsberg
- Erling Gjone (1898 in Levanger – 1990), an architectural historian and antiquarian
- Henry Rinnan (1915 in Levanger – 1947), a Gestapo agent and Nazi collaborator
- Martin Stavrum (born 1938), a politician and Mayor of Levanger from 1996-1999
- Erling Folkvord (born 1949 in Levanger), a left wing politician and writer
- Per Erik Bergsjø (born 1958 in Levanger), a Supreme Court Justice from March 2012
- Per Sandberg (born 1960 in Levanger), a politician

=== The Arts ===
- Martin Aagaard (1863 in Levanger – 1913), a Norwegian painter of marine paintings
- Benny Motzfeldt (1909 in Levanger – 1995), a visual artist, glass designer, and sculptor
- Jens Bolling (1915 in Levanger – 1992), a Norwegian actor and theatre director
- Sverre Valen (born 1925 in Levanger – 2023), a Norwegian choir conductor
- Eli Rygg (born 1955), a TV personality and children's writer who was brought up in Levanger
- Frode Haltli (born 1975 in Levanger), a Norwegian accordion player

=== Sport ===
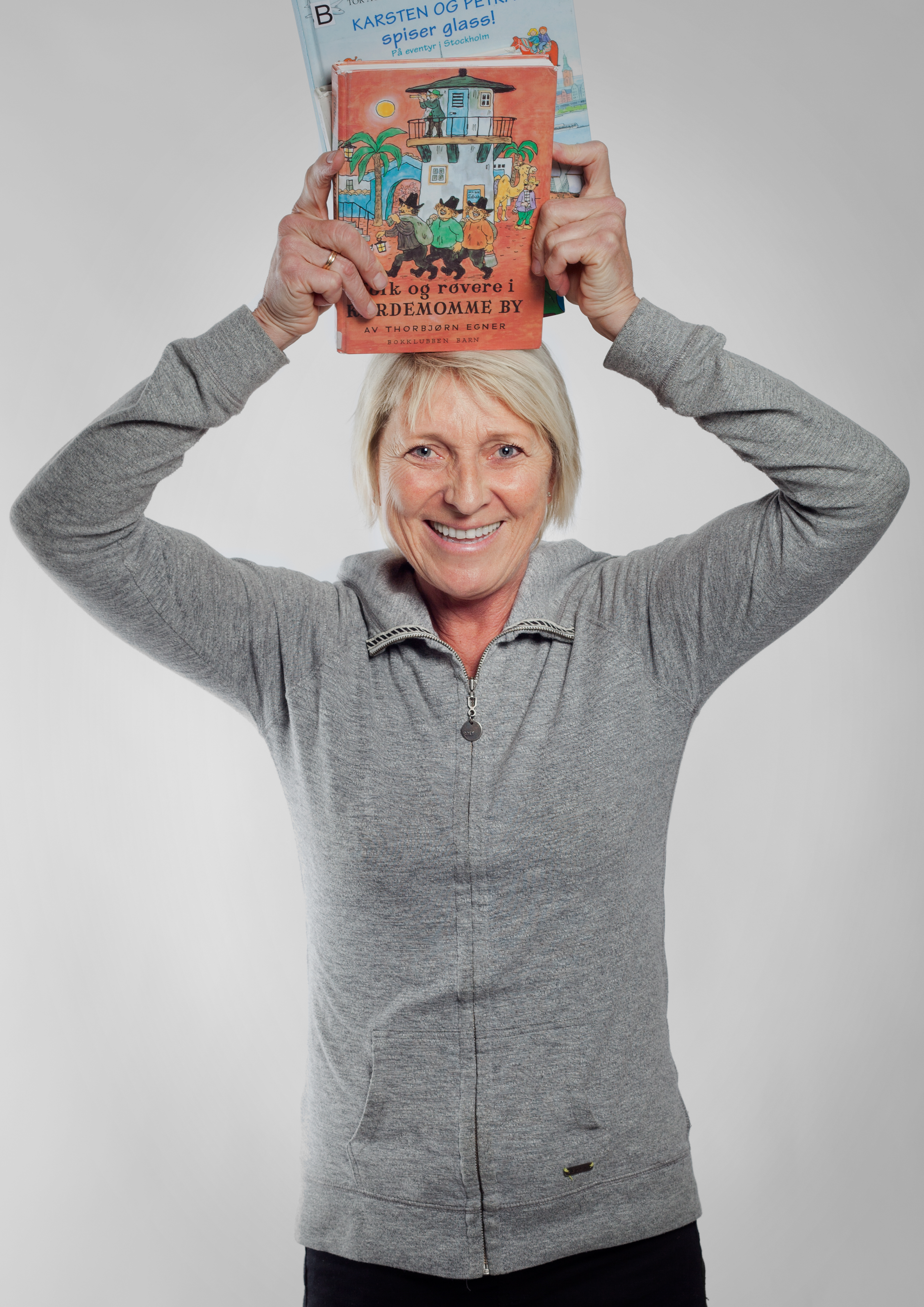
Marit Breivik, 2013

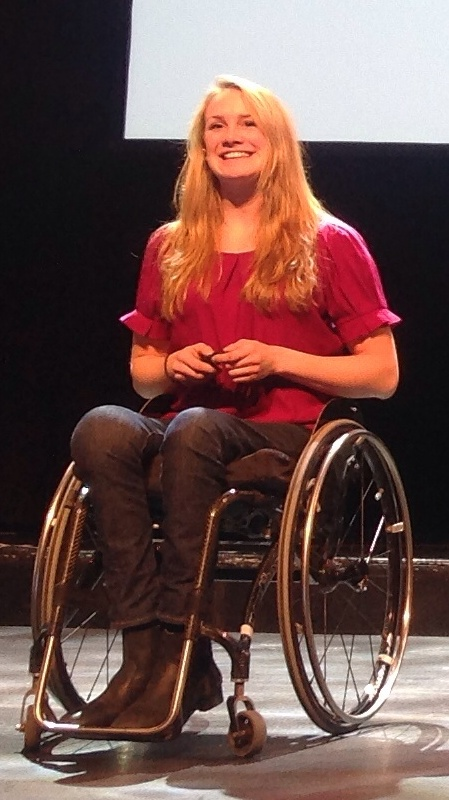
Birgit Skarstein, 2013

- Einar Jørum (1924 in Åsen – 1997), a footballer and president of the Football Association of Norway from 1970-1980
- Knut Knudsen (born 1950), a retired track-cyclist and gold medallist at the 1972 Summer Olympics
- Sturla Voll, (Norwegian Wiki) (born 1954), a Norwegian soccer coach
- Marit Breivik (born 1955 in Levanger), a former handballer and head coach for the national team
- Tina Svensson (born 1966 in Levanger), a footballer and team bronze medallist at the 1996 Summer Olympics
- Stein Berg Johansen (born 1969 in Levanger), a retired Norwegian football striker and coach
- Jon Olav Hjelde (born 1972 in Levanger), a former footballer with over 250 club caps
- Trond Viggo Toresen (born 1978 in Levanger), a footballer with over 250 club caps
- Eldar Rønning (born 1982 in Levanger), a cross-country skier, competed in two Winter Olympics
- Per Verner Rønning (born 1983 in Levanger), a former footballer with 380 club caps
- Johan Kjølstad (born 1983 in Levanger), a cross-country skier, competed in two Winter Olympics
- Birgit Skarstein (born 1989), a paraplegic competitive rower and cross-country skier
- Dardan Dreshaj (born 1992 in Levanger), a football striker with over 250 club caps

=== Expatriates ===
- Zakarias Toftezen (1821 in Levanger - 1901), an early settler in the State of Washington
- Bernt Julius Muus (1832 in Levanger – 1900), a Lutheran minister and church leader in Northfield, Minnesota
- Bernt B. Haugan (1862 in Skogn – 1931), a Lutheran minister, politician, and temperance leader
- Edin Cornelius Alfsen (1896 in Skogn – 1966), a Lutheran missionary who founded the Norwegian Tibet Mission
