= Arne Falstad =

Norwegian attorney, banker and politician

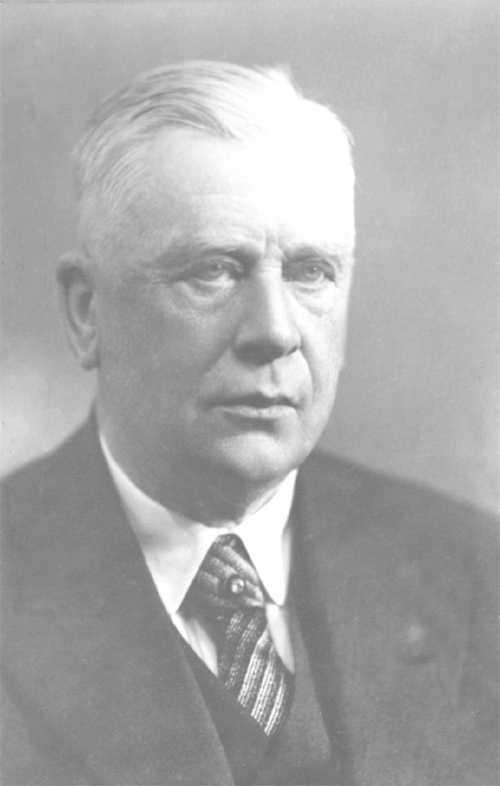
Arne Falstad.

Arne Falstad (1 May 1874 – 27 November 1958) was a Norwegian attorney, banker and politician for the Conservative Party.

He was born at Skjerpengen in Skogn Municipality as a son of banker Peder Falstad (1842–1921) and his wife Oline Kathrine Sæther (1837–1928). He was a maternal grandson of politician Peter Andreas Sæther.

He finished his secondary education in Trondhjem in 1892, and graduated with the cand.jur. degree in 1900. He was also a conscript officer from 1894, with promotions to Premier Lieutenant in 1902 and Captain in 1911. He was a junior solicitor in Trondhjem until 1903, then an attorney in Steinkjer Municipality from 1903 to 1921. He was also a defender in Inderøy District Court. He was a member of the executive committee of Steinkjer city council from 1913 to 1919, serving as deputy mayor from 1913 to 1916.

From 1921 to 1928 he was the director of Privatbanken in Levanger. He also worked as an attorney in the city. From 1939 he was a defender in Stjør- and Verdal District Court. He was a member of the municipal council of Levanger Municipality from 1928 to 1940, serving as deputy mayor in 1928–1929 and mayor in 1931–1932, 1934–1935 and 1940. He was elected as a deputy representative to the Parliament of Norway in 1924, 1930 and 1936 from the constituency Market towns of Sør-Trøndelag and Nord-Trøndelag counties. He met several times during parliamentary session, up to September 1945.

He was a board member of Levanger Elektrisitetsverk and chaired Indherred Kreditbank. He died on 27 November 1958.
