= Momarka =

Village in Levanger Municipality, Norway

- Village
- Interactive map of Momarka
- Location within Trøndelag Location within Norway
- Coordinates: 63.7276°N 11.2841°E
- Country: Norway
- Region: Central Norway
- County: Trøndelag
- District: Innherred
- Municipality: Levanger Municipality

Area
  - Total: 0.52 km^{2} (0.20 sq mi)
- Elevation: 56 m (184 ft)

Population (2000)
  - Total: 1,315
  - Density: 2,528/km^{2} (6,550/sq mi)
- Time zone: UTC+01:00 (CET)
  - Summer (DST): UTC+02:00 (CEST)
- Post Code: 7600 Levanger

Momarka is a village in Levanger Municipality in Trøndelag county, Norway. It is located just south of the town of Levanger. The Nordlandsbanen railway line and the European route E6 highway both run through the village.

The 0.52-square-kilometre (130-acre) village had a population (2000) of 1,315 and a population density of 2,528 inhabitants per square kilometre (6,550/sq mi). Since 2000, the population and area data for this village area has not been separately tracked by Statistics Norway.
