= Skogn =

Village in Levanger Municipality, Norway

- Village
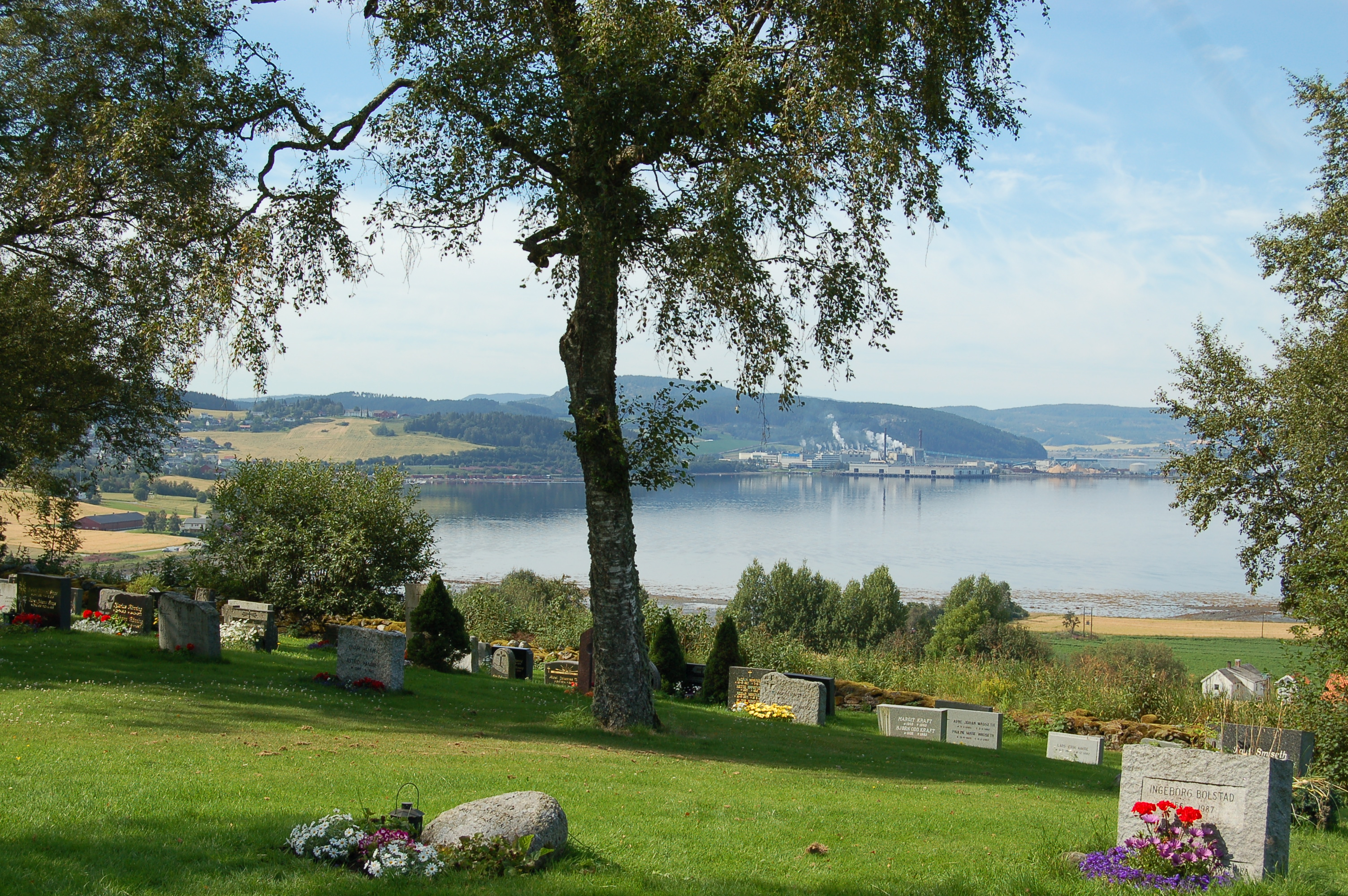
- View of the village
- Interactive map of Skogn
- Location within Trøndelag Location within Norway
- Coordinates: 63.7037°N 11.1926°E
- Region: Central Norway
- County: Trøndelag
- District: Innherred
- Municipality: Levanger Municipality

Area
  - Total: 1.13 km^{2} (0.44 sq mi)
- Elevation: 50 m (160 ft)

Population (2024)
  - Total: 1,935
  - Density: 1,712/km^{2} (4,430/sq mi)
- Time zone: UTC+01:00 (CET)
  - Summer (DST): UTC+02:00 (CEST)
- Post Code: 7620 Skogn

Skogn is a village in Levanger Municipality in Trøndelag county, Norway. The village is located on the eastern shore of the Trondheimsfjorden, about 8 kilometres (5.0 mi) southwest of the town of Levanger. The European route E06 highway runs through the village, just past the Fiborgtangen industrial area located along the shore. There is a Norske Skog Skogn paper mill at Fiborgtangen. The Nordlandsbanen railway line stops in the village at Skogn Station.

The 1.13-square-kilometre (280-acre) village has a population (2024) of 1,935 and a population density of 1,712 inhabitants per square kilometre (4,430/sq mi).

The village of Skogn was the administrative centre of the old Skogn Municipality from 1838 until the municipality was dissolved in 1962.

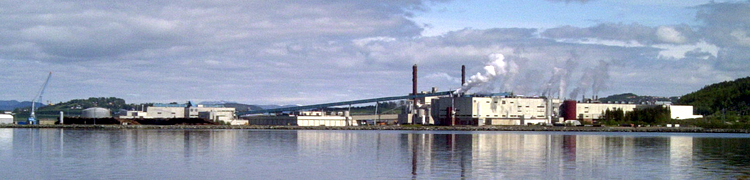
Fiborgtangen

== Notable people ==
- Marit Breivik, a handball coach
- Arne Falstad, a politician (Conservative)
- Snorre Gundersen, a politician (Conservative)
- Nils Hallan, a historian
- Idar Kjølsvik, a theologian
- Andreas Lunnan, a journalist
- Olav Norberg, a politician (Conservative)
- Peter August Poppe, an engineer
- Eldar Rønning, a Cross Country skier
- Per Sandberg, a politician (Progress)
- Egil Sjaastad, a writer
- Gustav Sjaastad, a politician (Labour)
- Robert Svarva, a politician (Labour)
