= Levangselva =

River in Trøndelag, Norway

- Interactive map of the river

Location
- Country: Norway
- County: Trøndelag
- Municipality: Levanger Municipality

Physical characteristics
- Source: Confluence of the rivers Tomtvasselva and Åselva
  - location: Damås, Levanger Municipality
  - coordinates: 63.71147°N 11.4644°E
  - elevation: 120 metres (390 ft)
- Mouth: Trondheimsfjorden
  - location: Levanger, Levanger Municipality
  - coordinates: 63.752818°N 11.299438°E
  - elevation: 0 metres (0 ft)
- Length: 16 km (9.9 mi)

Levangselva is a river that flows through Levanger Municipality in Trøndelag county, Norway. It flows into the Trondheimsfjord in the town of Levanger.

The area through which the river flows was once part of the old Frol Municipality. The river has Atlantic salmon and trout. The Hansfossen Power Station is located 15 kilometers (9 mi) upstream from the mouth at the 48-metre (157 ft) tall Hansfossen waterfall.

== See also ==
- List of rivers in Norway
