= Indherreds-Posten =

Norwegian newspaper

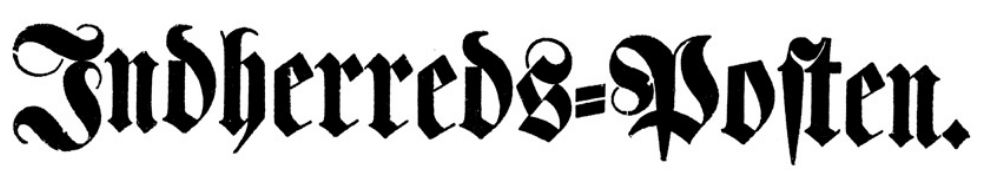
- Type: Weekly newspaper
- Format: Broadsheet
- Owner: Andersen family
- Founder: Johan Bernhard Andersen
- Publisher: B. Andersens trykkeri
- Founded: 3 January 1862; 164 years ago
- Language: Norwegian
- Headquarters: Søndre gate 60
- City: Steinkjer
- Country: Norway

Indherreds-Posten was a newspaper published in Steinkjer, Norway, between 1862 and 1929. It was known as Innheredsposten between 1890 and 1899, and as Trønderbladet from 1925. Politically, it was initially neutral, then aligned with the Conservative Party, later the Liberal Party, before ultimately aligning with the Radical People's Party.

Founded by Johan Bernhard Andersen, Indherreds-Posten was Steinkjer's first newspaper. He remained its owner and editor-in-chief until his death in 1878. Ownership passed to his wife, and the newspaper went through four editors in thirteen years. The job as editor, and later owner, passed to J. Bernhard's son, Fridtjof Andersen, in 1891. Under his leadership, the newspaper shifted to a much more radical direction. It also grew to become a regional newspaper for all of Nord-Trøndelag.

The newspaper was sold to the Labor Democrats in 1916, from 1921 known as the Radical People's Party. It moved to Levanger in 1924, at which time it took the name Trønderbladet, before ceasing operations in 1929.

== History ==
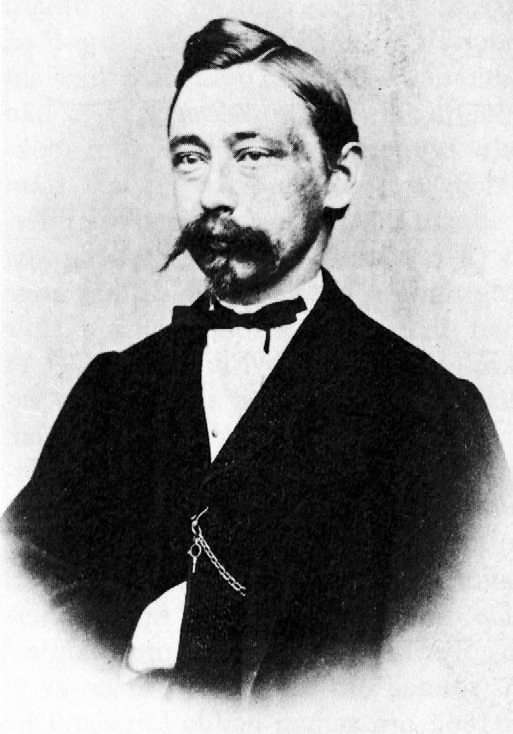
Founder Johan Bernhard Andersen

At the time Steinkjer received its township in 1857, it did not have a newspaper, and the only printing shop in the county was situated in Levanger. Bergen native and printer Johan Bernhard Andersen (born 1834) visited Steinkjer in 1861 and saw the potential in establishing both a printing press and a newspaper, and chose to move to Steinkjer that year. At the time it was still necessary to have royal permission to start a printing press, which Andersen received on 20 December 1861. In the mean time, he made a deal with Throndhjems Adresseavis to use their permits to sell advertisements in his new newspaper, for a commission. He rented facilities in the Gram estate in Nordsia and organized the printing press from there. The first issue of Indherreds-Posten was published on 3 January 1862. At the time Indherreds-Posten was founded, there were about one hundred newspapers in Norway, and most towns of a comparable size to Steinkjer already had a newspaper.

The newspaper initially came out twice a week, on Wednesdays and Saturdays, at noon. It was printed in broadsheet, normally with four pages. To begin with, the whole paper was set in fraktur.

The 1860s were financially difficult times, yet the newspaper was able to turn a slight profit. After a few years, Andersen bought the property at Søndre gate 60 in Sørsia and moved the newspaper there. By the 1870s, it had effectively become a newspaper covering all of Nord-Trøndelag.

For Steinkjer, the arrival of the press was important in rising awareness of politics. The right to vote was at the time severely restricted, yet even amongst those with voting rights, only a minority found their way to the polling stations. This was in part caused by limited knowledge about candidates and political issues. The 1865 parliamentary election was the first where Indherreds-Posten was able to bring political debate into the public consciousness through its coverage.

=== Conservative years ===
Andersen announced in the paper on 28 May 1878 that his health was poor, and was effecting his work, and published his last editorial in the same issue. He passed away on 11 June 1878, aged 44. His wife took over ownership and executive management of the company. For a while the newspaper was printed without a stated editor-in-chief. In this period, typographer Eilert Aasen and Anderson's lawyer. O. A. Over-Rein, took upon themselves the editorial work.

John Normann (1845–1898), a former career military officer, was appointed as editor-in-chief in the fall of 1878. His editorial line shifted the newspaper in a conservative direction. Meanwhile, the population in general was becoming more liberal. Normann was fired on the spot on 1 July 1880, after an incident where Steinkjer mayor Nicolay Martens felt he had been insulted by Normann.

In the following years, Johannes L. Rognaas and later O. V. Over-Rein were hired as editors-in-chief. They continued with the right-winged-alignment, and from 1885 the newspaper officially stated its alignment with the Conservative Party.

Indherreds-Posten lost its spot as Steinkjer's only newspaper in 1883, with the establishment of Indtrønderen. It was established with backing from the Liberal Party and enjoyed early success. As Indtrønderen was much more aligned with the public opinion, readership for Indherreds-Posten fell dramatically and by 1887 it was near bankruptcy.

=== Liberal and radical years ===
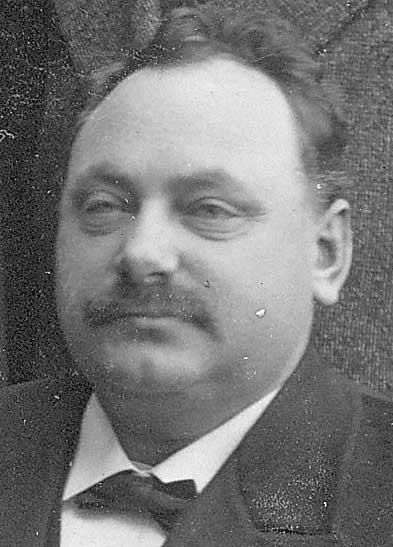
Fridtjof Andersen was editor from 1891 to 1916

Fridtjof Andersen, son of J. Bernhard, returned to Steinkjer in 1887, having completed his trade certificate in printing. He was much more radical than Over-Rein, and convinced his mother to re-align the newspaper in a more liberal direction. After some intermediate editors, Marius Gevik (1864–1958) was hired as a new editor-in-chief in 1888. As Indtrønderen retained a formal independent position, Indherreds-Posten officially aligned with the Liberal Party.

Andersen took over as editor-in-chief from the first issue of 1891. His appointment shifted the newspaper even further to the left. It promoted pacifism and support to the labor movement. For instance he made "universal suffrage and direct taxation" the newspaper's slogan. Kristian Andreas Jensen was a contributor with labor movement articles during the 1890s.

Steinkjer was a garrison town, with Steinkjersannan a major employer. Several of the editorials in the newspaper were by these regarded as so defamatory that they resulted in Andersen being court-martialed. This tended to raise his regard amongst pacifists, who saw him standing guard to defend the free press. He was also opposed to the military budget increases, which caused friction with the Liberal Party, with whom his newspaper was officially aligned. The newspaper would later pivot completely in the military issue in conjunction with the dissolution of the union between Norway and Sweden.

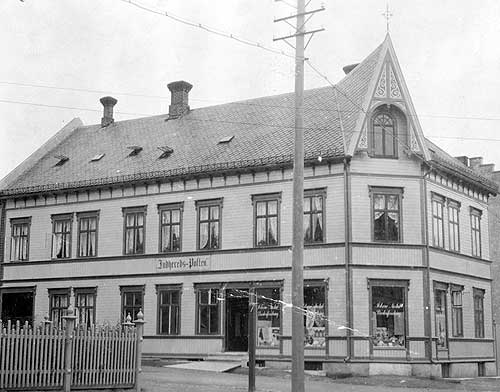
Indherreds-Posten's offices at the corner of Kongens gate and St Olafs gate ca 1910

In the 1900 town fire, the newspaper's facilities in Sørsia were one of the few which survived unscathed. Yet, Andersen chose to buy a lot in Kongens gate and build a property there. This was largely funded through debt, which he struggled to pay off.

Indherreds-Posten was met with increasing competition, as more and more newspapers were started in Steinkjer. Over-Rein started Indhereds Tidende in 1888, which lasted until 1894. It was in many ways succeeded by the Conservative Stenkjær Avis. The independent Mjølner, later Inntrøndelagen, was founded in 1897. The Labor Party operated Framsteg between 1906 and 1908. Finally, Indherred (later Nord-Trøndelag) was founded in 1910. Between the increase competition and a number of poor decisions, Indherreds-Posten fell into increasingly difficult times.

=== Trønderbladet ===
The newspaper was sold to the Labor Democrats in 1916 (from 1921 known as the Radical People's Party), who would own the newspaper for the rest of its life. They hired Odin Leopold Elnan (1887–1957) from Beitstad as its editor-in-chief. He was central in the party, having established a number of local chapters in 1912, and running for Parliament in 1916.

At the time of the sale, circulation was down to 500. Under new ownership, this number rose to 3000 in 1920. However, its reach fell after this, and by 1924 Indherreds-Posten shut down its Steinkjer operations, with the last issue being published on 8 November 1924. During most of these years, it increased to three weekly issues.

The newspaper relocated to Levanger and started up again with publications on 3 April 1925, still with Elnan as editor. However, it changed its name to Trønderbladet. After the move, the newspaper initially came out twice weekly, then thrice weekly from 1926. It was reduced down to twice weekly again in 1928. The final issue was published on 10 June 1929.

Printing of the newspaper initially took place at Weigners Trykkeri in Steinkjer, although it moved to the press at Nord-Trøndelag after only eight issues. Printing moved to Alb. Rygh in Levanger from 1926 and then to the press at Nordre Trondhjems Amts Tidende from 1927.
