= Kristian Andreas Jensen =

Norwegian politician and newspaper editor

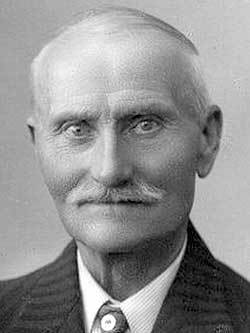
Kristian Andreas Jensen

Kristian Andreas Jensen (22 November 1869–May 1954), often abbreviated K. A. Jensen, was a Norwegian politician for the Labour Party and a newspaper editor. He was central in building up the Labour Party in the early 20th century in Inntrøndelag, especially in Steinkjer, where he was the first party chapter chairman and sat in the municipal council from 1913 to 1929. He was county leader for the Labour Party in two stints, from 1906 to 1906, and in 1923. He founded and was editor-in-chief of the newspaper Framsteg and was later editor of Indtrøndelagens Socialdemokrat.

== Early and personal life ==
Jensen was born on 22 November 1869, and grew up on the farm Oksås in Egge Municipality. He attended folk high school. In the 1890s had a small croft under the farm Kvam. He moved to Steinkjer, before building a house at Heggesenget in Egge. He later moved back to Steinkjer. He married Anne née Jonsdatter (born 1867) from Sandvollan. They had five children: Olaf, Aslaug, Arne, Einar and Borghild. Jensen died in May 1954 and was buried on 15 May in Egge Cemetery.

== Party organizer ==
Jensen was a construction worker, and also worked for a period at the brick factory at Trana. The labor movement came later to Steinkjer than many other areas of the country. It was with the construction of the Hell–Sunnan Line that the movement gained enough momentum to actually organize. The political wing, the Labour Party, was incorporated in Steinkjer on 13 March 1904. Jensen was one of the driving forces behind its establishment, and was also its first chairman.

Jensen was elected as chairman of Nord-Trøndelag Labour Party at the annual meeting in 1906, a position he continued to hold until the annual meeting in 1909. For the final year, the county party was split, with Jensen continuing as chair of the Inntrøndelag Labour Party.

In the late 1910s there was an internal dispute in the Labour Party concerning whether it should join the Communist International. Jensen was one of six delegates from Inntrøndelag sent to the party congress and supported joining Comintern, albeit with their mandate bound by the county annual meeting. However, he later moderated his stance, and remained part of the Labour Party when it left Comintern. Jensen thus became interim county leader for parts of 1923, after the leader had joined the Communist Party.

== Politics ==
Jensen was a member of Steinkjer Municipal Council between 1913 and 1929, and sat in the executive committee for several periods.

He ran as the Labour Party's top candidate for Parliament in the constituency of Snaasa four times—in 1906, 1912, 1913 and 1918, under the system of single-member districts. With the introduction of plurality districts, he ran twice on fifth place for the Labour Party for the constituency of Nord-Trøndelag. None of the elections were successful.

== Editor ==
Jensen published a collection of short stories while in his youth. During the editorial period of Fridtjof Andersen in the 1890s, he wrote political articles for the newspaper Indherreds-Posten.

His first stint as an editor was with the monthly magazine Daggry, which had its first issue on 1 May 1905 and ran until June 1906. It was highly political and was a mechanism to promote the ideas of the labor movement in the local area.

Ahead of the 1906 parliamentary election, the Labour Party wanted to establish a newspaper in Innherred to promote its views. The issue was deferred by the party's annual meeting,. and instead Jensen and John Myransen established a limited company which would publish a social-democratic newspaper, Framsteg. Jensen became editor-in-chief for the entire history of the newspaper. The first issue was published on 30 August 1906, with the newspaper being weekly. By May the newspaper was in so deep financial trouble that they moved their offices to Jensen's home to avoid having to pay rent. Ownership and operation passed to the county chapter of the Labor Party on 1 January 1908. The annual meeting that year decided to close down the newspaper, and the last issue was published on 10 July 1908.

The Labour Party started the newspaper Indtrøndelagens Socialdemokrat in Levanger in 1912. In 1914 its editor Afred Kruse was deported due to the authorities not liking is anti-military editorial stance. After an interim period with Reinert Torgeirson, Jensen was appointed as editor-in-chief, a position he held until 1917.

== Bibliography ==
- Benum, Aksel (1945). Husmennene i Egge: noen trekk av husmennenes historie i Egge (in Norwegian). Steinkjer: Steinkjer Trykkeri.
- Hansen, Guttorm (1953). Arbeiderbevegelsen i Nord-Trøndelag 50 år (in Norwegian).
- Høeg, Tom Arbo (1973). Norske aviser 1763–1969: en bibliografi: Alfabetisk fortegnelse (in Norwegian). Vol. 1. Oslo: University of Oslo Library. ISBN 82-7000-014-9.
- Solum, Gunnar (2003). Veien mot rettferd og lysere kår: Nord-Trøndelag arbeiderparti 100 år 1903–2003 (in Norwegian). Steinkjer: Labour Party.
- Øisang, Ole (1934). Arbeiderbevegelsen i Trøndelag (in Norwegian). Trondheim: Arbeider-Avisa.
