= Øisang =

Øisang is a surname. Notable people with the surname include:

- Ingebjørg Øisang (1892–1956), Norwegian politician
- Ole Øisang (1893–1963), Norwegian newspaper editor and politician
- Per Øisang (1920–1967), Norwegian journalist
