= 1933 Norwegian parliamentary election =

- 16 October 1933

All 150 seats in the Storting 76 seats needed for a majority
- Turnout: 76.3%
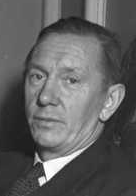

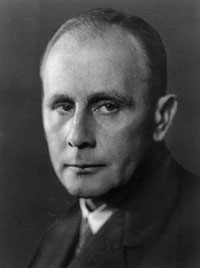

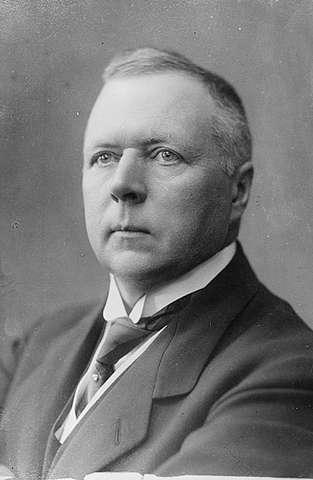

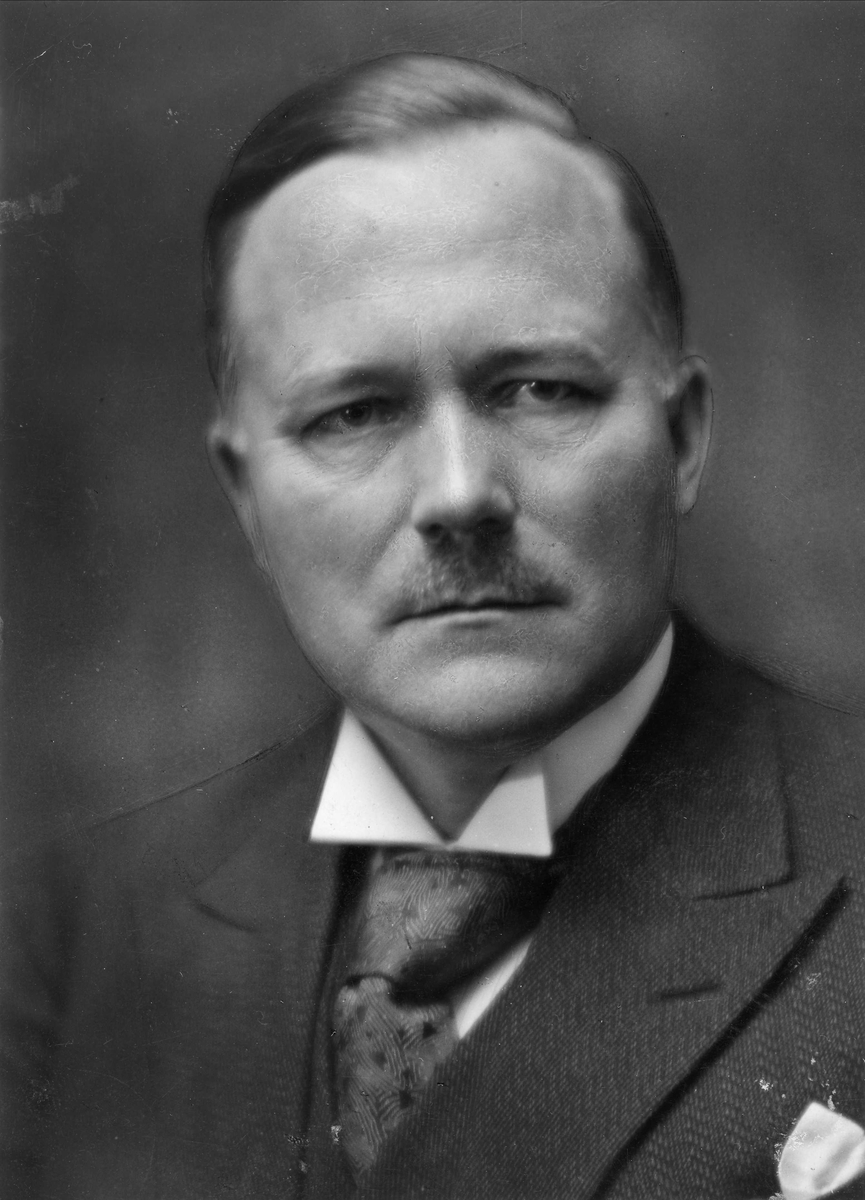

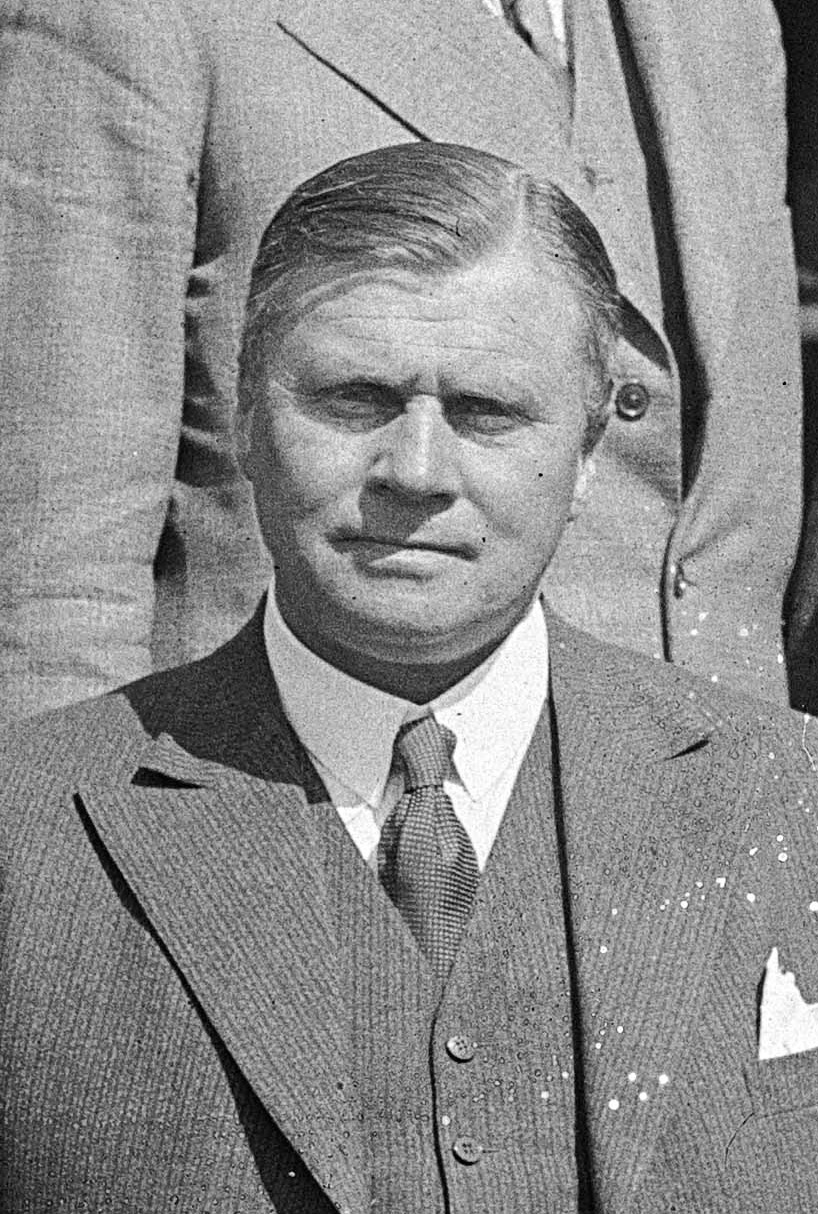

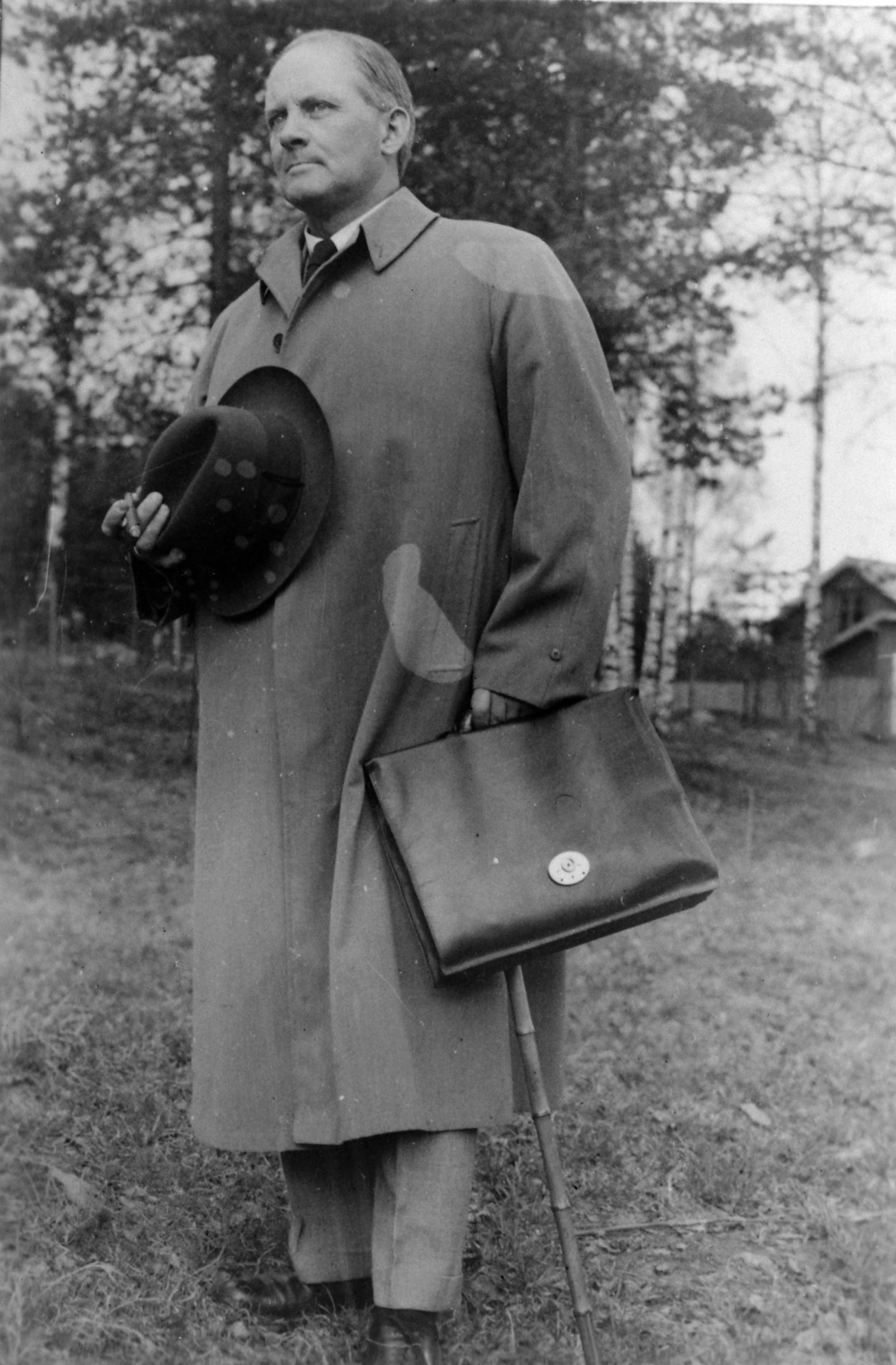

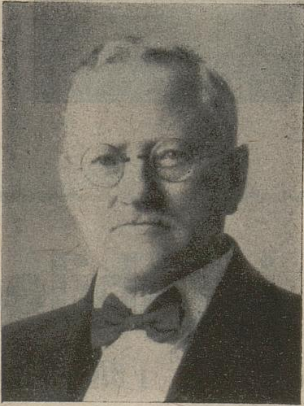

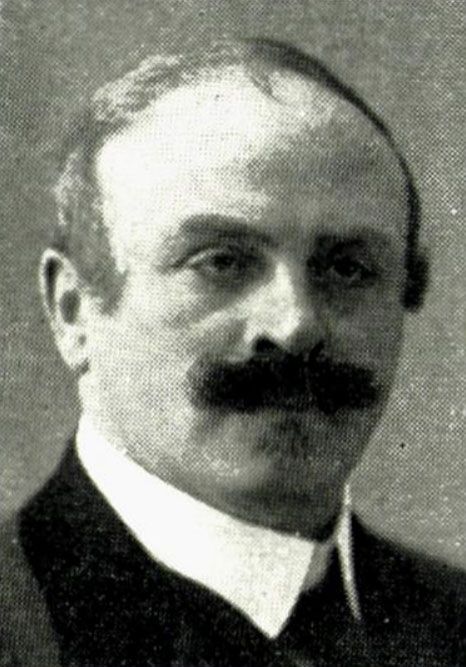
	First party	Second party	Third party
Leader	Oscar Torp	C. J. Hambro	Johan Ludwig Mowinckel
Party	Labour	Conservative	Liberal
Last election	31.4%, 47 seats	27.4%, 39 seats	20.2%, 33 seats
Seats won	69	30	24
Seat change	▲22	▼9	▼9
Popular vote	500,526	252,506 (H+FF)	213,153
Percentage	40.1%	20.2% (H+FF)	17.7%
	Fourth party	Fifth party	Sixth party
Leader	Jens Hundseid	Rolf Thommessen	Bertram Dybwad Brochmann
Party	Farmers'	Free-minded; Liberal	Society
Last election	15.9%, 25 seats	2.6%, 5 seats/with H	–
Seats won	23	1	1
Seat change	▼2	▼4	New
Popular vote	173,634	20,184/All. with H	18,786
Percentage	13.9%	1.6%/—	1.5%
	Seventh party	Eighth party
Leader	Ingebrigt Bjørø	Alf Mjøen
Party	Christian; Democratic	Radical People's
Last election	–	0.8%, 1 seat
Seats won	1	1
Seat change	New	Steady
Popular vote	10,272	6,858
Percentage	0.8%	0.5%
Prime Minister before election
Johan Ludwig Mowinckel
Liberal
Prime Minister after election
Johan Ludwig Mowinckel
Liberal

Parliamentary elections were held in Norway on 16 October 1933. The result was a victory for the Labour Party, which won 69 of the 150 seats in the Storting.

== Campaign ==
=== Slogans ===
Party	Original slogan	English translation
Labour Party	"Hele folket i arbeid" — By og land hand i hand"	"Entire population at work — city and countryside hand in hand"
Conservative Party		
Liberal Party		
Farmer's Party		
Free-minded People's Party	Hård mot terror! Varm mot nød!	"Tough against terror! Warm against distress!"
Nasjonal Samling		
Communist Party of Norway		
Society Party		
Christian Democratic Party		
Radical People's Party		

=== National daily newspaper endorsements ===
Newspaper	Party endorsed	Notes
Bergens Arbeiderblad	Labour Party	
Romsdal Folkeblad	Labour Party	
Vestfold Fremtid	Labour Party	
Horten Arbeiderblad	Labour Party	
Vestfold Arbeiderblad	Labour Party	
Hamar Arbeiderblad	Labour Party	
Namdal Arbeiderblad	Labour Party	
Kongsberg Tidende	Free-minded Liberal Party	
Nordlys	Labour Party	
Sunnmøre Arbeideravis	Labour Party	
Sunnmøre Tidend	Farmers' Party	
Dagbladet	Liberal Party	
Velgeren	Liberal Party	Vote down the class parties, vote down the Conservative Party
Porsgrunns Dagblad	Liberal Party	
Romeriksposten	Liberal Party	
Haugesunds Avis	Liberal Party	
Sunnmørsposten	Liberal Party	
Inntrøndelagen	Liberal Party	
Stavanger Aftenblad	Liberal Party	
Stjørdalens Blad	Liberal Party	
Asker og Bærums Budstikke	Conservative Party	
Vestlandske Tidende	Conservative Party	
Moss Avis	Conservative Party	
Moss Avis	Farmers' Party	
Ofotens Tidende	Conservative Party	
Ofotens Tidende	Free-minded Liberal Party	
Moss Tilskuer	Conservative Party	
Moss Tilskuer	Free-minded Liberal Party	
Forstadsposten	Conservative Party	
Morgenbladet	Conservative Party	
Sogningen	Conservative Party	
Sandefjords Blad	Conservative Party	
Christianssands Tidende	Conservative Party	
Aftenposten	Conservative Party	
Bergens Aftenblad	Conservative Party	
Tidens Tegn	Free-minded Liberal Party	
Norges Kvinder	Did not support any party	Norges Kvinder er intet partibladt, det er noitralt og har til opgave å samle kviner av alle partier til arbeide for social og økonomisk framgang

== Results ==
Party	Votes	%	Seats	+/–
Labour Party	500,526	40.08	69	+22
Conservative Party (Note: The Conservative Party and the Free-minded People's Party continued their alliance, but in some constituencies the Free-minded People's Party ran separate lists.)	252,506	20.22	30	–9
Free-minded People's Party	252,506	20.22	0	–2
Liberal Party	213,153	17.07	24	–9
Farmers' Party	173,634	13.91	23	–2
Nasjonal Samling	27,850	2.23	0	New
Communist Party	22,773	1.82	0	0
Free-minded People's Party	20,184	1.62	1	–2
Society Party	18,786	1.50	1	New
Christian Democratic Party	10,272	0.82	1	New
Radical People's Party	6,858	0.55	1	0
Other parties	2,130	0.17	0	–
Wild votes	14	0.00	–	–
Total	1,248,686	100.00	150	0
Valid votes	1,248,686	99.49		
Invalid/blank votes	6,352	0.51		
Total votes	1,255,038	100.00		
Registered voters/turnout	1,643,498	76.36		
Source: Nohlen & Stöver

=== Seat distribution ===
Constituency	Total seats	Seats won							
Constituency	Total seats	Ap	H–FV	V	B	FV	Sfp	KrF	RF
Akershus	7	4	2		1				
Aust-Agder	4	1	1	1	1				
Bergen	5	2	1	1			1		
Buskerud	5	3	1		1				
Finnmark	3	2	1						
Hedmark	7	5			2				
Hordaland	8	2	1	3	1				
Market towns of Akershus and Østfold	4	3	1					1	
Market towns of Buskerud	3	2	1						
Market towns of Hedmark and Oppland	3	2	1						
Market towns of Møre	3	2		1					
Market towns of Nordland, Troms and Finnmark	4	2	1	1					
Market towns of Sør-Trøndelag and Nord-Trøndelag	5	2	2			1			
Market towns of Telemark and Aust-Agder	5	2	2	1					
Market towns of Vest-Agder and Rogaland	7	3	2	2					
Market towns of Vestfold	4	2	2						
Møre	7	1		3	3				
Nord-Trøndelag	5	2		1	2				
Nordland	8	4	1	1	2				
Oppland	6	3			2				1
Oslo	7	4	3						
Østfold	6	3	1		2				
Rogaland	5	1	1	2	1				
Sogn og Fjordane	5	1		2	2				
Sør-Trøndelag	6	3	1	1	1				
Telemark	5	3		1	1				
Troms	5	3	1	1					
Vest-Agder	4	1	1	1	1				
Vestfold	4	1	2	1					
Total	150	69	30	24	23	1	1	1	1
Source: Norges Offisielle Statistikk
