= Framsteg =

Norwegian newspaper (1906–08)

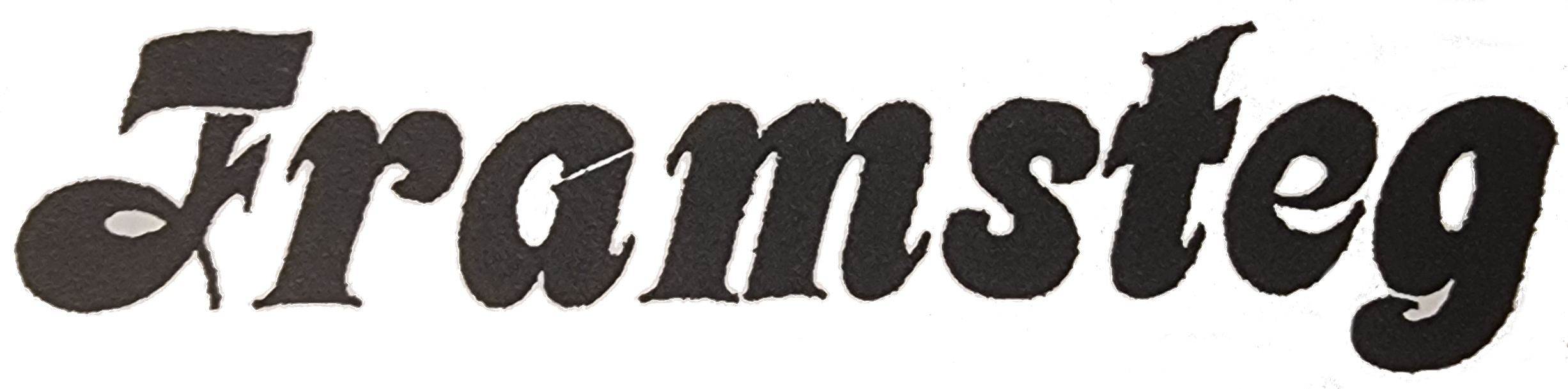
- Founder(s): Kristian Andreas Jensen and John Myranes
- Publisher: Inntrøndelag Labor Party
- Editor: Kristian Andreas Jensen
- Founded: 30 August 1906; 119 years ago
- Ceased publication: 10 July 1908; 118 years ago
- Political alignment: Labor Party
- Language: Norwegian
- City: Steinkjer
- Country: Norway

Framsteg was a weekly newspaper published in Steinkjer, Norway, between 30 August 1906 and 10 July 1908. It was aligned with, and from 1908 directly owned by, the Labor Party. Framsteg was the only socialist-aligned newspaper to be published in Steinkjer. Founders were Kristian Andreas Jensen and John Myranes, the former who was the editor. The newspaper was never able to make ends meet financially and was closed in 1908.

== History ==
Compared to the rest of the country, the labor movement was late at developing in Nord-Trøndelag. This was not least due to the lack of any significant large-scale industry in the area. The construction of the Hell–Sunnan Line during the 1900s was the starting position for much of the labor movement in Innherred. At the time there were three newspapers published in Steinkjer, none of which had a socialist alignment: Indherreds-Posten, Stenkjær Avis and Inntrøndelagen.

A prelude to the establishment of Framsteg was the monthly social-democratic magazine Daggry, which was first published on 1 May 1905. It had Kristian Andreas Jensen as an editor, and was printed at Inntrøndelagen. It was the only of the newspapers which was politically neutral, and editor Jan Engum was, despite his loyalty to the Liberal Party, sufficiently inclined towards the labor movement that he allowed them to use his press. Daggry had its last issue in June 1906.

Framsteg was established in the run-up to the 1906 Norwegian parliamentary election. This election saw the introduction of single-member districts, which would in effect make it impossible for anyone but the Liberal Party to win the seats in rural Trøndelag. It also represented the first time the Labor Party ran for election in the constituencies in Nord-Trøndelag. The Labor Party therefor wanted to emphasize information policies, and saw the establishment of a socialist newspaper as part of this strategy. Proposals for stating a party newspaper were voted over at both the annual meetings in 1905 and 1906 in the county chapter. The 1906 voted in favor, but postponed the issue to the next annual meeting.

Instead, the initiative was taken by Kristian Andreas Jensen and John Myranes, who established a limited company to publish the newspaper. Kristian Andreas Jensen became the editor, while Myranes was elected chairman in October. Jensen was also an active politician was the top candidate for the Labor Party in Steinkjer for the 1906 parliamentary election.

The first issue was published on 30 August 1906, with the newspaper being weekly. In addition to self-produced local content and journalism, the newspaper syndicated content from Ny Tid and Social-Demokraten. By October the circulation had reached 541, and a board was elected. The newspaper continued to try to recruit new subscribers, but was unable to make ends meet. By May the newspaper was in so deep financial trouble that they moved their offices to Jensen's home to avoid having to pay rent.

The paper was initially printed at Inntrøndelagen. Around May Engum refused to print more, after Framsteg had failed to pay for four consecutive print runs. Instead printing moved to Stenkjær Avis and Steinkjer Trykkeri; despite that editor Rich. Weigner was a staunch anti-socialist, he was happy to accept their money. This issue may have had a detrimental effect on the newspapers. Several issues were not published, subscribers feared that they would lose their subscription payments if the newspaper collapsed, and the header was changed. Starting on 11 November 1907, there was a strike amongst typographers in Steinkjer. Framsteg was not published until it was able to secure a deal for publication in Levanger from 30 November. There was a municipal election in Steinkjer on 4 December, and Framsteg was the only Steinkjer newspaper able to publish ahead of this election. The Labor Party did well in the election.

Ownership and operation passed to the county chapter of the Labor Party on 1 January 1908, and the county board became the newspaper's board. Initially the county board launched grandiose plans to make Framsteg the loading newspaper in the county. However, only months later, the 1908 annual meeting unanimously voted to close down the newspaper. The decision called for a temporary closure, until a labor-owned printing press and sufficient capital could be raised. The last issue of Framsteg was published on 10 July 1908. No socialist newspaper would ever be published in Steinkjer again, although Indtrøndelagens Socialdemokrat was published in Levanger from 1912 to 1923, where Jensen was editor from 1914 to 1915.
