= Indhereds Tidende =

Norwegian newspaper

- Type: Biweekly newspaper
- Format: Broadsheet
- Founder: O. A. Overrein
- Founded: 1888; 138 years ago
- Language: Norwegian
- City: Steinkjer
- Country: Norway

Indhereds Tidende was a biweekly newspaper published in Steinkjer, Norway, from 1888. It was aligned with the Conservative Party, with O. A. Overrein as its editor-in-chief. The newspaper had a libelous tone and was shut down after a number of court cases, which had eventually led to the party disowning it.

== History ==
By the late 1880s, Steinkjer had two newspapers, Indherreds-Posten and Indtrønderen. Following the death of Indherreds-Posten' founder Johan Bernhard Andersen, the newspaper moved politically to the right, until eventually declaring itself a Conservative newspaper. However, when J. Barnhard's son Fridtjof Andersen came into management around 1888, the newspaper moved politically to the left again, leaving conservatives without a newspaper in Steinkjer.

The initiative to establish a conservative newspaper was taken by O. A. Overrein, who also became the newspaper's only editor-in-chief. The newspaper was published twice weekly from 1888. It was officially aligned with the Conservative Party.

Overrein did not hold back in his editorials and political coverage. This resulted in the newspaper being sued several times for libel. The last of these followed a news story about an incident where a man in the Netherlands had fallen into a grain bin and been choked to death by the grain. Overrain was at the time in a feud with the owner of the local grain mill, and stated that had such an incident happened at Stenkjær Møllebrug, the man would have been choked by sand, not grains. The scandals were too much for the Conservative Party, who had to disown the newspaper as an official voice of the party. They would go on to establish a new conservative newspaper, Stenkjær Avis, in 1894.
