= John A. Schefte =

Norwegian newspaper editor and politician

John Anton Schefte (16 February 1872 – 24 February 1957) was a Norwegian newspaper editor and politician for the Liberal Party.

He was born in Ogndal, and had a bookprinter's education. He was the editor-in-chief of Grømstad-Posten from 1900 to 1908, and was also a member of the municipal council for Grimstad. He then started and edited Indherred from October 1910 to September 1919. He was acting editor of Inntrøndelagen briefly, before taking over as editor of Stjørdalens Blad. He was a member of the municipal council of Stjørdal Municipality as well, and was a temperance activist. He remained editor of Stjørdalens Blad until his death in February 1957. He was buried in Værnes.
