= Langhelle =

Langhelle is a surname. Notable people with the surname include:

- Harald Langhelle (1890–1942), Norwegian politician
- Jørgen Langhelle (1965–2021), Norwegian actor
- Nils Langhelle, Norwegian politician
