= 1936 Norwegian parliamentary election =

- 19 October 1936

All 150 seats in the Storting 76 seats needed for a majority
- Turnout: 84.0%
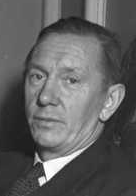

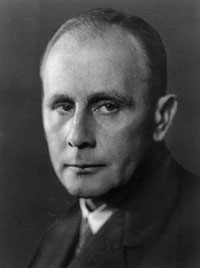

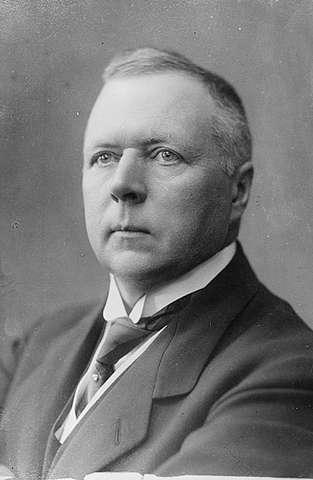

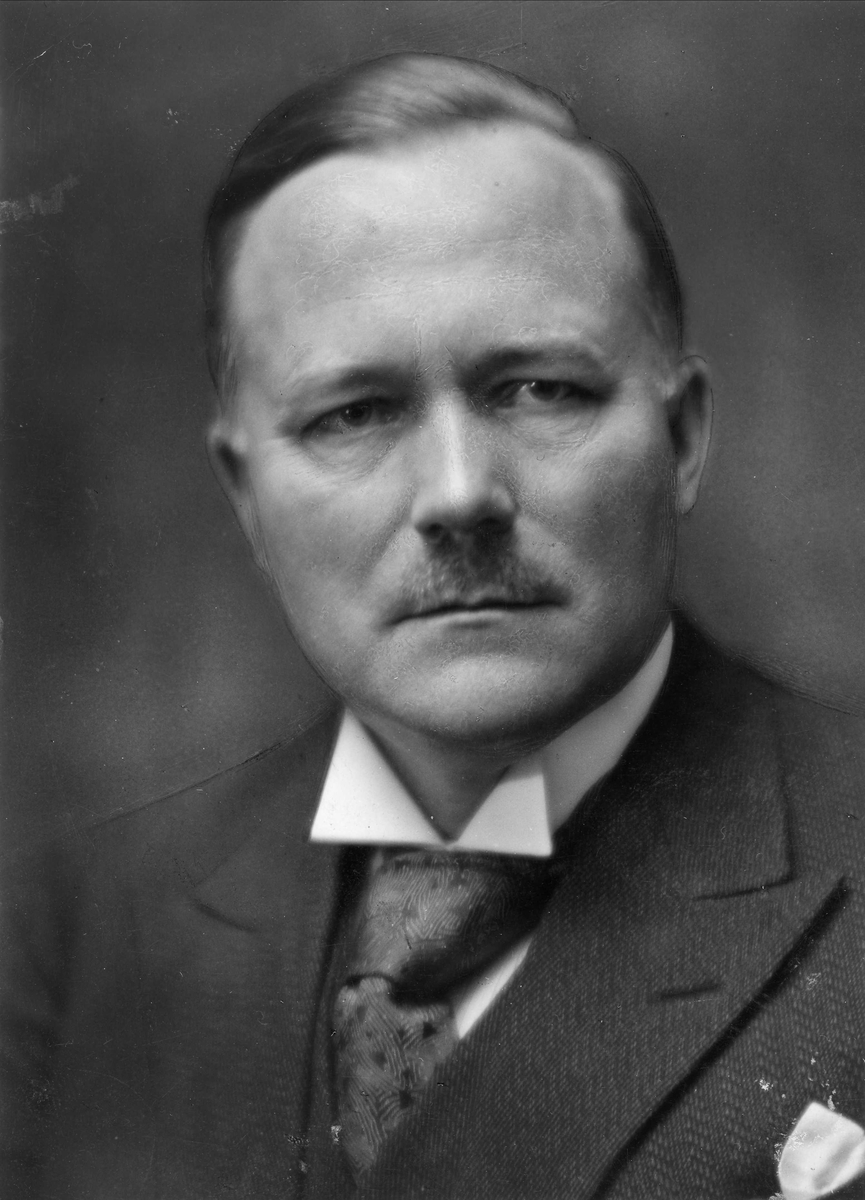

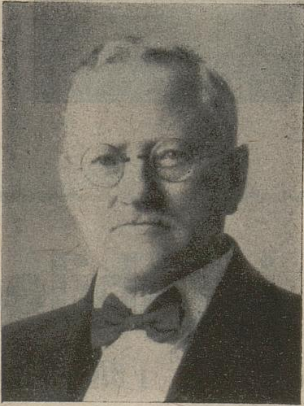

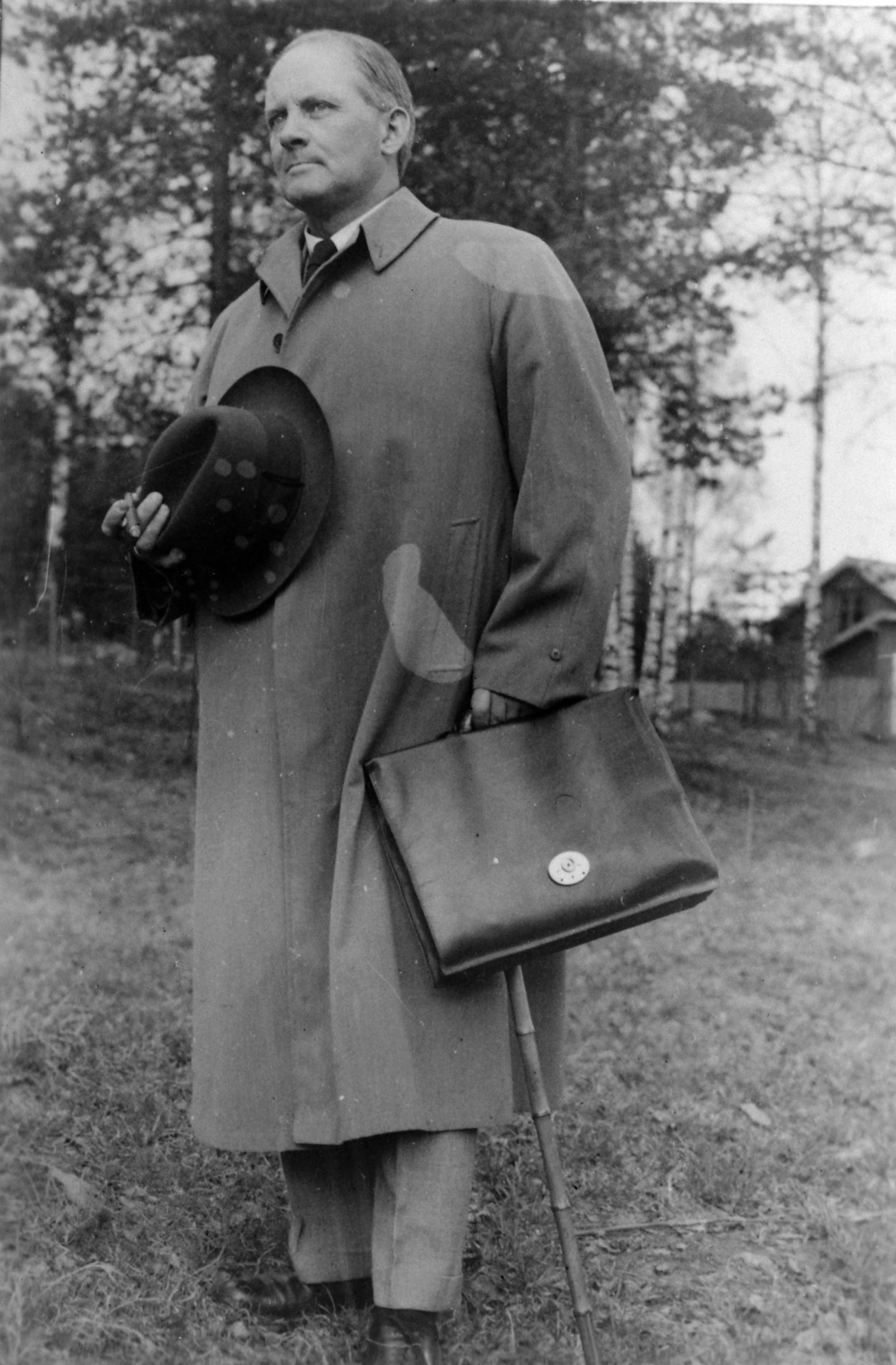
	First party	Second party	Third party
Leader	Oscar Torp	Johan H. Andresen	Johan Ludwig Mowinckel
Party	Labour	Conservative	Liberal
Last election	40.1%, 69 seats	20.2%, 30 seats	17.7%, 24 seats
Seats won	70	36	23
Seat change	▲1	▲6	▼1
Popular vote	618,616	310,324	232,784
Percentage	42.5%	21.3%	16.0%
	Fourth party	Fifth party	Sixth party
Leader	Jens Hundseid	Ingebrigt Bjørø	Bertram Dybwad Brochmann
Party	Farmers'	Christian; Democratic	Society
Last election	13.9%, 23 seats	0.8%, 1 seat	1.5%, 1 seat
Seats won	18	2	1
Seat change	▼5	▲1	0
Popular vote	168,038	19,612	45,109
Percentage	11.5%	1.3%	3.1%
- Results by county
Prime Minister before election
Johan Nygaardsvold
Labour
Prime Minister after election
Johan Nygaardsvold
Labour

Parliamentary elections were held in Norway on 19 October 1936, the last before World War II and the German invasion of Norway. The result was a victory for the Labour Party, which won 70 of the 150 seats in the Storting.

During the election campaign, the conservative and liberal parties ran on the slogan "A free people in a free Norway." They argued that a Labour Party victory would lead to terrorism, dictatorship, and Marxism. A prominent controversial topic during the election campaign was the decision of the Labour government to allow Leon Trotsky to take up a domicile in Norway in 1935.

== Campaign ==
=== Slogans ===
Party	Original slogan	English translation
Labour Party	"Trygge kår for barn og hjem"	"Safe conditions for children and homes"
Conservative Party		
Liberal Party		
Farmer's Party		
Nasjonal Samling		
Communist Party of Norway		
Free-minded People's Party		
Society Party		
Christian Democratic Party		
Radical People's Party		

=== National daily newspaper endorsements ===
Newspaper	Party endorsed
Adresseavisen	Conservative Party

== Results ==
Party	Votes	%	Seats	+/–
Labour Party	618,616	42.51	70	+1
Conservative Party–Free-minded People's Party (Note: The Conservative Party and the Free-minded People's Party continued their alliance, but in some constituencies the Free-minded People's Party ran a joint list with the Fatherland League.)	310,324	21.32	36	+6
Liberal Party	232,784	16.00	23	–1
Farmers' Party	168,038	11.55	18	–5
Society Party	45,109	3.10	1	0
Nasjonal Samling	26,577	1.83	0	0
Christian Democratic Party	19,612	1.35	2	+1
Free-minded People's Party–Fatherland League	19,236	1.32	0	0
Radical People's Party	6,407	0.44	0	–1
Communist Party	4,376	0.30	0	0
Other parties	4,132	0.28	0	–
Wild votes	27	0.00	–	–
Total	1,455,238	100.00	150	0
Valid votes	1,455,238	99.44		
Invalid/blank votes	8,230	0.56		
Total votes	1,463,468	100.00		
Registered voters/turnout	1,741,905	84.02		
Source: Nohlen & Stöver

=== Seat distribution ===
Constituency	Total seats	Seats won					
Constituency	Total seats	Ap	H–FV	V	B	KrF	Sfp
Akershus	7	4	2		1		
Aust-Agder	4	1	1	1	1		
Bergen	5	2	1	2			
Buskerud	5	3	1		1		
Finnmark	3	2	1				
Hedmark	7	5	1		1		
Hordaland	8	2	1	2	1	2	
Market towns of Akershus and Østfold	4	2	2				
Market towns of Buskerud	3	2	1				
Market towns of Hedmark and Oppland	3	2	1				
Market towns of Møre	3	1	1	1			
Market towns of Nordland, Troms and Finnmark	4	2	1	1			
Market towns of Sør-Trøndelag and Nord-Trøndelag	5	3	2				
Market towns of Telemark and Aust-Agder	5	2	2	1			
Market towns of Vest-Agder and Rogaland	7	3	2	2			
Market towns of Vestfold	4	2	2				
Møre	7	2		3	2		
Nord-Trøndelag	5	2		1	2		
Nordland	8	3	2	1	1		1
Oppland	6	4			2		
Oslo	7	4	3				
Østfold	6	3	2		1		
Rogaland	5	1	1	2	1		
Sogn og Fjordane	5	1	1	2	1		
Sør-Trøndelag	6	3	1	1	1		
Telemark	5	3		1	1		
Troms	5	3	1	1			
Vest-Agder	4	1	1	1	1		
Vestfold	4	2	2				
Total	150	70	36	23	18	2	1
Source: Norges Offisielle Statistikk
