= Ofoten (disambiguation) =

Ofoten may refer to:

== Places ==
- Ofoten, a traditional district in Nordland county, Norway
- Ofoten Municipality, a former municipality in Nordland county, Norway
- Ofotfjorden, or Ofoten Fjord, a fjord in Nordland county, Norway

== Other ==
- Ofoten Line, a railway line in Narvik Municipality in Nordland county, Norway
- Ofotens Tidende, an online newspaper published in Narvik Municipality in Nordland county, Norway
- Ofotens Bilruter, a bus company based in Narvik Municipality in Nordland county, Norway
- Ofoten District Court, a former district court in northern Norway
