= Nordenfjeldsk Tidende =

Norwegian newspaper

Nordenfjeldsk Tidende was a newspaper published in Levanger, Norway, between 1874 and 1921.

The newspaper was founded by Olai Olsen, who was also its first editor-in-chief. The most long-serving editor was Marius Gevik, who edited from 1893 to 1921. Nordenfjeldsk Tidende was initially aligned with the movement which developed into the Liberal Party. After the party split, it aligned with the Free-minded Liberal Party, before aligning with the Farmers' Party in its final years. The newspaper merged with Steinkjer-based Nord-Trøndelag from 1922, to create Nord-Trøndelag og Nordenfjeldsk Tidende. Through a further merger with Inntrøndelagen it has since become Trønder-Avisa.

== History ==
Nordenfjeldsk Tidende was the second newspaper in Levanger. The town was already served by Nordre Trondhjems Amtstidende, which had been founded in 1848. In the 1870s there was a liberal movement, which did not like the political alignment of Amtstidende. Amongst these, teacher Olai Olsen from Skogn took the initiative to start a second newspaper, which he named Nordenfjelsk Tidende. It had its first issue in 1874.

Olsen ran the newspaper as a sole proprietor. P. C. Andresaen took over as editor-in-chief from the first issue of 1876. Olsen sold the newspaper to Oluf Bergmann, who then also became editor. Olsen then moved to Trondheim, where he founded and was the inaugural editor of Dagsposten. In the mid-1880s, a limited company was established, which took over the newspaper. Former principal Hans Wexelsen was hired as editor in 1886. Marius Gevik took over as editor in 1893, and remained in that position for the rest of the newspaper's history.

The newspaper bought the building at Haakon den godes gate 38B for 4998 kroner in 1896, a year after it had been completed. A year later, it burnt down in the town fire. While the building was being rebuilt, the newspaper was printed at Innherreds Folkeblad in Verdalsøra. The newspaper rebuilt its facilities at the same address. The new building had an apartment for Gevik. The printing press was at various times located in the basement and then in an auxiliary building. From 1912, a third newspaper started up in Levanger, Indtrøndelagens Socialdemokrat.

Politically, the newspaper was aligned with the Liberal Party. At the time of the party split in 1909, it aligned with the Free-minded Liberal Party. This lasted to 1918, when Gevik broke with the party. From then it was increasingly aligned with the Agrarian movement, and became tied to the Farmers' Party from 1920.

Nordenfjeldsk Tidende merged with the Steinkjer-based newspaper Nord-Trøndelag from 1 May 1922, which was also aligned with the Farmers' Party. The new newspaer Nord-Trøndelag og Nordenfjeldsk Tidende was headquartered in Steinkjer, with Johannes Kjesbu as editor. The newspaper moved its Levanger offices after the merger to Kirkegata 45B, where it reamined until 1929, when the Levanger offices were shut down. The newspaper continued to operate until 1940, when it merged with Inntrøndelagen to form Nord-Trødelag og Inntrønderen, from 1952 Trønder-Avisa.
