= Olav Hougen =

Norwegian politician and newspaper editor

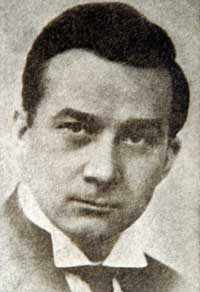
Olav Hougen

Olav Hougen (2 September 1890 – 7 September 1943), born Olav Haugen, was a Norwegian newspaper editor, politician for the Liberal Party and songwriter.

Born in Trysil, Hougen originally trained and worked as a teacher. He became a journalist for Porsgrunns Dagblad in 1917, and then editor for Norig in 1921. He moved to Steinkjer in 1926, where he became editor for Inntrøndelagen. Following the bombing of the newspaper in 1940, he became joint editor-in-chief of Nord-Trøndelag og Inntrøndelagen.

Hougen sat six years in Steinkjer Municipal Council, and was mayor from 1937 to 1939. In 1939 he founded, together with his sister, a bookstore in Steinkjer. He was arrested by the German occupational forces in 1942, interned at Falstad and died of the trauma a year later.

== Early and personal life ==
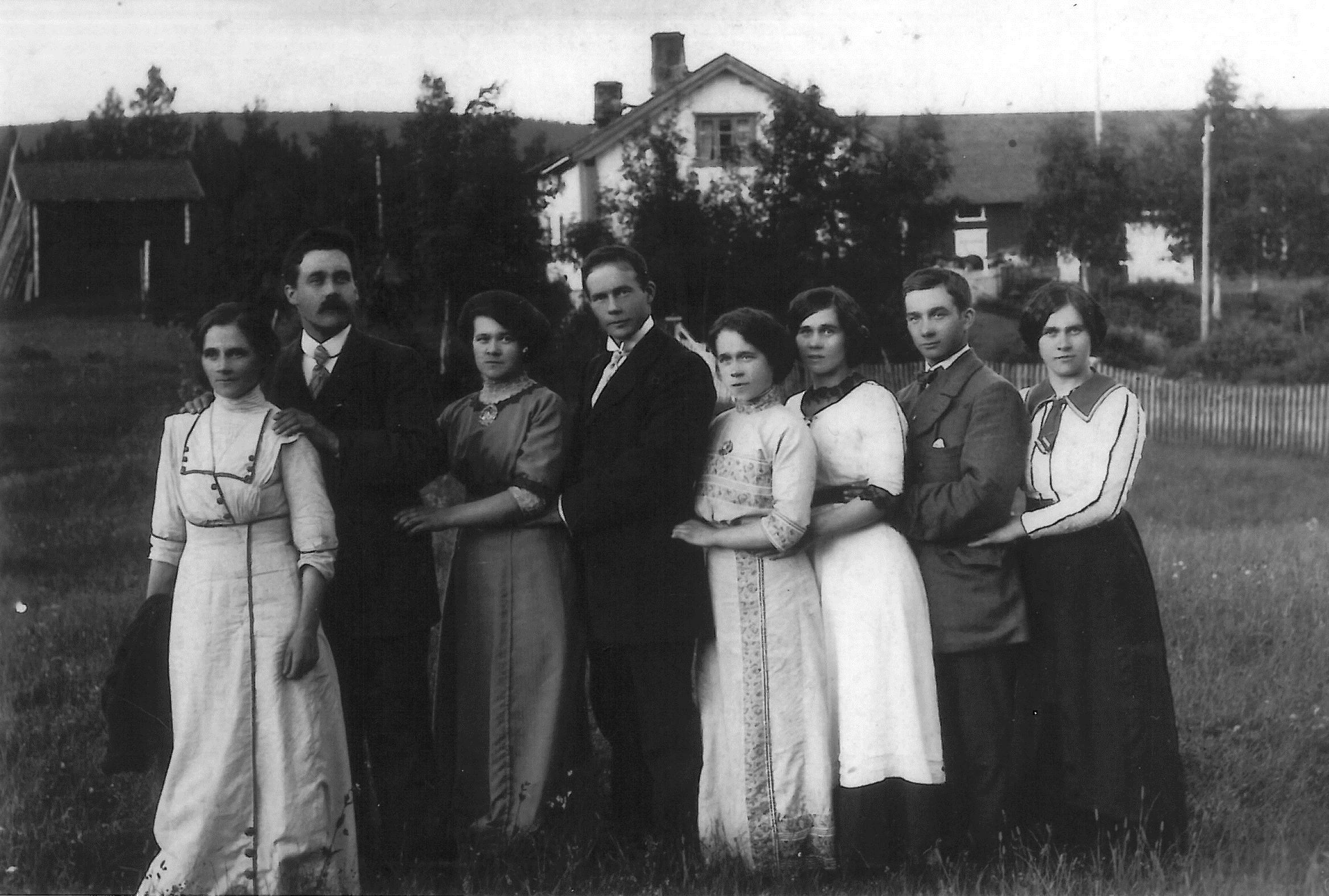
Olav (second from the right) along with his sigblings at their home farm at Løvbekkstra around 1916

He was born Olav Haugen on 2 September 1890, as the tenth of twelve children to Gjertrud (1853–1923) and Ola Haugen (1853–1938). His older brother Ole Haugen-Flermoe became a prominent author, while his sister Anne married prominent children book author Halvor Floden. Olav grew up on the farm Løvbekksetra, situated between Østby and Ljørdalen in Trysil Municipality.

He married Bergljot Andersen (1899–1967) from Holla Municipality in 1924. They had no less than two children. Sigbjørn Hougen (25 February 1931 – 17 February 2003), who took over the bookstore, and ceramicer Bjørg Hougen.

== Professional career ==
Hougan took his teachers' education at Elverum Teacher College, graduating in 1913. He then worked four years as a teacher in Gjøvik.

In 1917 he moved to Porsgrunn and started working as a journalist for Porsgrunns Dagblad. From 1921 he became editor-in-chief of the Skien-based newspaper Norig. He moved to Steinkjer in 1926 and started working for the newspaper Inntrøndelagen, where he remained editor-in-chief until 1940.

In 1939 he established the bookstore Steinkjer Bokhandel along with his sister (Magna) Oddveig. After his death, Oddveig ran the bookstore until his son Sigbjørn took over in 1960. Management passed to his son Olav in 1996, before being sold out of the family to the Norli chain in 2001.

Steinkjer was bombed on 21 April 1940, and both Nord-Trøndelag og Nordenfjeldsk Tidende and Inntrøndelagen lost their offices and printing presses in the raid. The rivalry between the two newspapers was strong at the time. Hougen and Johannes Kjesbu, editor of the competing Agrarian Party newspaper agreed that the circumstance warranted a joint newspaper, which was initially named Nord-Trøndelag og Inntrøndelagen (Trønder-Avisa from 1952). The newspaper was operated with the two as joint editors. Both were poisoned by the German occupying forced in 1942.

== Politics ==
Hougen served two periods, for a combined six years, in the municipal council of Steinkjer Municipality for the Liberal Party. He was mayor from 1937 to 1939. He was chairman for Steinkjer Liberal Party for eight years, and secretary in Nord-Trøndelag Liberal Party for many years. He sat nine years on the municipal school board, four years as chairman, and also sat on the library board.

== Writing ==
Hougen was a playwright and songwriter. He wrote the lyrics for two songs of particular prominence: Steinkjersangen (1931) and Nord-Trøndelagsangen. The song Du skog som klær et værhardt land, gir ly og levekår won a prize from the Norwegian Forestry Society. In 1926 the play Egtemenn was published. A memorial text about the bombing of Steinkjer, Bombesøndagen i Steinkjer og krigen i Innherred i aprildagene 1940, was published post-humously.

== Death ==
Hougen was removed as editor, arrested and interned at Falstad concentration camp in 1942. He died of the trauma in Steinkjer on 7 September 1943.
