= Birger Gotaas =

Karl Birger Vodahl Gotaas
- Born: 22 July 1883; Minnesota
- Died: 14 June 1960 (aged 76); Oslo
- Occupation: Journalist

Karl Birger Vodahl Gotaas (22 July 1883 – 14 June 1960) was a Norwegian journalist, newspaper editor and non-fiction writer.

== Career ==
Gotaas was born in Minnesota on 22 July 1883. He grew up among other places in Steinkjer, where he had his first job as a journalist in Stenkjær Avis. He edited the newspapers Stavangeren and Bergens Aftenblad, and headed Høyres Pressekontor from 1925 to 1950. During the Norwegian Campaign in 1940 he was press officer for the Norwegian general staff, and wrote the book Fra 9. april til 7. juni. in 1945. Gotaas served as secretary general for the Conservative Party from 1945 to 1946.

Gotaas died in Oslo on 14 June 1960.
