= Halvor Floden =

Norwegian writer (1884–1956)

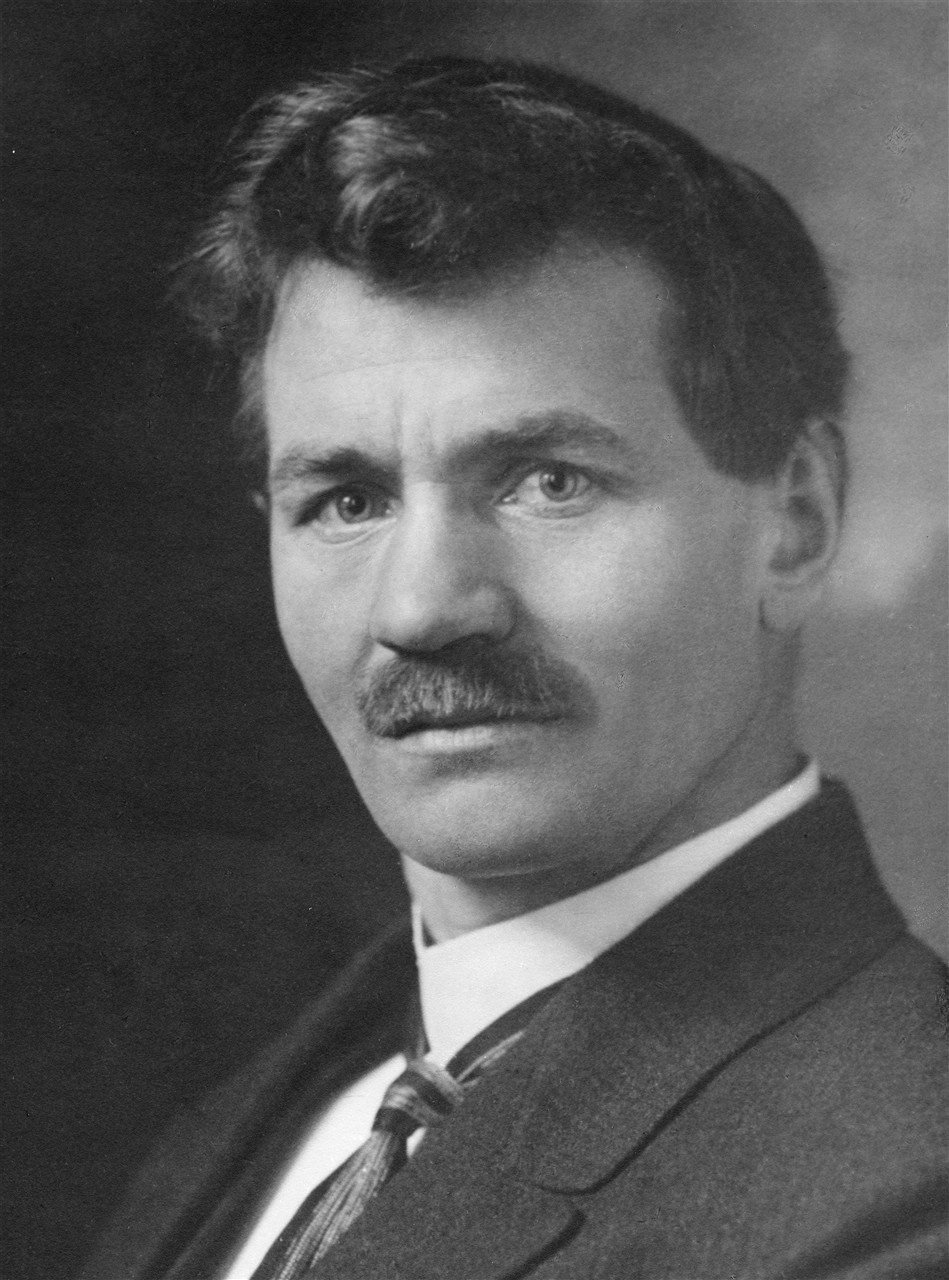
- Halvor Floden
- Born: 22 July 1884; Trysil Municipality, Norway
- Died: 3 December 1956 (aged 72); Elverum Municipality, Norway
- Occupations: Schoolteacher; Children's writer Novelist; Poet; Playwright

Halvor Floden (22 July 1884 – 3 December 1956) was a Norwegian schoolteacher, children's writer, novelist, poet and playwright.

== Biography ==
He was born in Trysil Municipality to farmer Torgal Olsen Floden and Tea Skjærholde. In 1907 he married teacher and nurse Anne Olsdatter Haugen (1867-1945) and settled as a schoolteacher in Elverum Municipality. Through his marriage, he became the brother-in-law of children's book author Ole Haugen-Flermoe (1878–1956) and newspaper editor Olav Hougen (1890–1943).

Floden made his literary debut in 1911, with the children's book Brør og halvbrør. Among his 24 children's books are Fagerlia from 1915, Frik med fela from 1917, and Kari Trestakk from 1922. His novel Vi har bruk for deg from 1937 treats the subject of exploitation of children. The posthumously Ein fjellgard was issued by Norsk Folkeminnelag in a series on cultural history. He was awarded the Melsom Prize in 1935.
