= Indtrøndelagens Socialdemokrat =

Norwegian newspaper (1912–27)

- Founded: 2 December 1912; 113 years ago
- Ceased publication: 17 June 1927; 99 years ago
- Political alignment: Labor Party
- Language: Norwegian
- City: Levanger
- Country: Norway

Indtrøndelagens Socialdemokrat was a newspaper published in Levanger, Norway, between 2 December 1912 and 17 June 1927. It was politically aligned with and owned by the Labor Party, and was the sole Labor newspaper in Inntrøndelag. From 1923 it was named Folkets Rett. At the time of its closure, it was merged into the Trondheim-based Arbeider-Avisen.

== History ==
A Social Democratic Association for Levanger and its environs was established as a local chapter of the Labor Party on 19 May 1907. An early task for the chapter was to establish a partisan newspaper for Levanger, thus establishing a committee consisting of P. Holthe, Ant. Andersen and Nelius Hallan. The three ultimately became the newspaper's first board, with Holthe serving as chairman and Hallan as editor-in-chief.

This was part of a major expansion of the Labor press at the time. From 1905 to 1913, the number of Labor newspapers increased from nine to thirty-two, four of which were founded in 1912 alone. Naming the newspaper "Foo Socialdemokrat" was the norm at the time. Indtrøndelagens Socialdemokrat was the second attempt at starting a Labor-newspaper in the county of Nord-Trøndelag, after Framsteg, which had been published in the neighboring town of Steinkjer between 1906 and 1908. Ny Tid had been published in Trondheim for since 1899, but the physical newspaper took several days to transport to Levanger. Ny Tid also lacked local news from Inntrøndelag. Indtrøndelagens Socialdemokrat would compete with the two extant newspapers in Levanger, both of which were more right-leaning: Nordre Trondhjems Amtstidende and Nordenfjeldsk Tidende.

The 1912 annual meeting in Inntrøndelag Labor Party voted in favor of establishing a newspaper in Levanger, and issued an extra membership fee to fund a press fund which would finance the start-up of the operations. The newspaper's first issue was published on 2 December 1912.

The newspaper had an agreement to have Indtrøndelagens Socialdemokrat printed at the press belonging to the competitor Amtstidende, but after only two issues, they canceled the agreement. Business owners in Levanger started boycotting the newspaper and printing shop as long as they allowed the printing of a socialist newspaper. As a result, Indtrøndelagens Socialdemokrat had to be printed in Verdalsøra at the localities of Innherreds Folkeblad. Indtrøndelagens Socialdemokrat received its own printing press in 1914. After it initially came out once or twice a week, having its own printing press allowed the newspaper to publish thrice a week.

The Danish trade unionist Alfred Kruse was hired as editor-in-chief of Indtrøndelagens Socialdemokrat in 1914. He was much more radical than Hallan and a pacifist. After the break-out of the First World War, his attitudes were disliked by the authorities, and as he was a Danish rather than Norwegian citizen, he was given twenty-four hours to leave the country. Kruse was promptly deported to Sweden with police escort. Reinert Torgeirson acted as editor for a short period, before being replaced by Kristian Andreas Jensen, who was in turn succeeded by Arvid Lian in 1917. Hallan returned to the editor's chair in 1919 and retained the position until the newspaper closed down.

With the Labor Party joining the Communist International, it was no longer in line with policy to use socialdemocratic terminology. The annual meeting therefore voted to change the name of the newspaper to Folkets Rett ("The Right of the People"). The last issue under the name Indtrøndelagens Socialdemokrat was published on 28 March 1923, and the first as Folkets Rett on 3 April.

The split of the Labor Party, with the break-out of the Communist Party caused a decline in the readership of Folkets Rett. Unlike in Trondheim, where the Communist Party secured control of Ny Tid, Folkets Rett remained under the control of the Labor Party. As their new newspaper in Trondheim, the party established Arbeider-Avisen in 1924. The party came to believe that they were better served with Arbeider-Avisen covering all of Trøndelag, and in 1927 the annual meeting in Inn-Trøndelag Labor Party voted to close down the newspaper. The last issue came out on 17 June 1927. The assets and staff were taken over by Arbeider-Avisen and Hallan was made local news editor for Levanger. The subscribers started receiving Arbeider-Avisen as a substitute.
