= Johannes Kjesbu =

Johannes Kjesbu (11 May 1871 – 21 November 1951) was a Norwegian newspaper editor and teacher, affiliated with the Center Party. Hailing from Ogndal, he was editor-in-chief successively for the Steinkjer newspapers Inntrøndelagen (1912–19), Nord-Trøndelag (1919–22) and its successor Nord-Trøndelag og Nordenfjelsk Tidende (1922–40) and then Nord-Trøndelag og Indtrøndelagen (1940–42, 1945–49).

== Early and personal life ==
He was born in Ogndal Municipality on 11 May 1871, and grew up on the Kjesbu farm.

He was active in the Youth Society. He played the violin and was an active folk musician in his younger years. As the oldest son he had the right to inherit the farm, but left it to his younger brother, Arne Kjesbu, who was also a folk musician and later mayor. Johannes Kjesbu attended Askov High School in Denmark, and he was strongly influenced by grundtvigianism. He was eager outdoors enthusiast and nature poet.

== Professional life ==
Kjesbu started as an elementary school teacher in Ogndal. He later worked for as a teacher for Inntrøndelag Folk High School from 1898, and from 1903 to 1912 at Namdal Folk High School.

He started working as the editor of Steinkjer-based newspaper Inntrøndelagen in 1912, where he remained until 1919. In 1919 he was hired in the process of Indherred relaunching as Nord-Trøndelag. This was part of a switch to make it a party newspaper aligned with Agrarian Party (later the Center Party). It merged in 1922 with Nordenfjeldsk Tidende of Levanger to form Nord-Trøndelag og Nordenfjeldsk Tidende. Kjesbu remained editor of the newspaper for the rest of its duration, until 1940.

Steinkjer was bombed on 21 April 1940, and both Nord-Trøndelag og Nordenfjeldsk Tidende and Inntrøndelagen lost their offices and printing presses in the raid. The rivalry between the two newspapers was strong at the time, especially since Inntrøndelagen had become affiliated with the Liberal Party in 1922. Kjesbu and the competitor's editor, Olav Hougen, agreed that the circumstance warranted a joint newspaper, which was initially named Nord-Trøndelag og Inntrøndelagen (Trønder-Avisa from 1952). The newspaper was operated with the two as joint editors. Both were poisoned by the German occupying forced in 1942, with Hougen dying the following year. Kjesbu returned as editor after liberation in 1945, and remained until 1949. He died on 21 November 1951.
