= Eigil Gullvåg =

Norwegian newspaper editor and politician

Eigil Gullvåg (27 February 1921 – 1991) was a Norwegian newspaper editor and politician for the Labour Party.

He was born in Trondheim. He was hired as a journalist in Arbeider-Avisa in 1945, and was editor-in-chief from 1958 to 1983. When stepping down as editor-in-chief, he was decorated with the HM The King's Medal of Merit. He continued working in the newspaper until reaching the retirement age. He was also a member of the board of the Norwegian Press Association and Association of Norwegian Editors.

Gullvåg was also active in the Norwegian Labour Party. He was a member of its national board from 1961 to 1969, and represented the party in Trondheim city council for five terms; from 1970 to 1971 he served as deputy mayor, and from 1964 to 1980 he was a member of the city council executive committee. From 1976 to 1983 he was also a member of Sør-Trøndelag county council. At the time of his death in November 1991, he had recently been re-elected for a sixth term.

Media offices
Preceded by Ole Øisang	Chief editor of Arbeider-Avisa; 1958–1983	Succeeded by Terje Dalen
