= Per Øisang =

Norwegian journalist

Per Øisang (21 February 1920 – 12 January 1967) was a Norwegian journalist. He was best known as a radio and television presenter and correspondent in the Norwegian Broadcasting Corporation.

== Early life ==
He was born in Tønsberg in 1920, but later moved to Trondheim. He was a student at the outset of World War II and subsequently during the occupation of Norway by Nazi Germany. He was arrested in Trondheim by the Nazi authorities on 2 November 1943, and was imprisoned at Falstad, then moved to Grini where he sat from 22 September 1944 to the liberation on 8 May 1945.

== Career ==
He started his journalistic career in 1945 in Arbeider-Avisa, took the Master of Science degree in Chicago in 1947 and was hired as subeditor in Bergens Arbeiderblad in 1949. From 1954 he was a member of the board of the Norwegian Press Association, and chaired its local branch in Bergen. He left Bergen in 1959 to work with the Norwegian Broadcasting Corporation's coverage of the Norwegian Parliament. Among others, he was in charge of televised debates during election campaigns in the early 1960s, although the role of the television presenters at the time was limited. The actual questioning of the political party representatives was conducted by other party representatives, an arrangement that would not change until the late 1960s.

In December 1964 Øisang was hired as the new foreign correspondent of the Norwegian Broadcasting Corporation news department, mainly appearing in the news program Dagsrevyen. He left this position in the summer of 1966, and was succeeded by Jahn Otto Johansen, at that time the only permanent foreign correspondent of Dagsrevyen. Øisang was hired as chief editor of the Norwegian Broadcasting Corporation news department. However, he died in January 1967, less than 47 years old.
