= Stenkjær Avis =

Former Norwegian newspaper

- Type: Weekly newspaper
- Format: Broadsheet
- Owner: Richard Weigner (1900-)
- Publisher: A/S Stenkjær Avis
- Founded: 18 September 1894; 131 years ago
- Language: Norwegian
- City: Steinkjer
- Country: Norway

Stenkjær Avis was a newspaper published in Steinkjer, Norway, between 18 September 1894 and 30 December 1909. It was established in political alignment with Conservative Party. It shifted to a pure business newspaper in 1908. Its assets and subscriptions were sold to Inntrøndelagen when it closed down.

== History ==
Steinkjer's first newspaper, Indherreds-Posten, had shifted its alignment to the Conservative Party around 1885. However, under the influence of Fridtjof Andersen, it shifted towards the left. O. A. Overrein therefore established Indhereds Tidende in 1888 in an attempt to have a Conservative newspaper in town. Overrein had a rather libelous writing style, and was sued for this several times, the costs of which ended up folding the publishing company in 1894.

Conservatives in Steinkjer still wanted their own newspaper, and Steinkjær and Environs Moderate-Conservative Association took the initiative to found Stenkjær Avis. Inaugural editor-in-chief was Daniel Kokk (1858–1935), a former military officer, while the publishing company A/S Stenkjær Avis was led by town engineer and captain Sigurd Jensen.

The newspaper was published twice a week, on Tuesdays and Fridays. It was initially a four-page, four-column publication, with all print set in fraktur. It was initially printed at the competitor Indherreds-Posten.

Kokk and Fridtjof Andersen, editor-in-chief of Indherreds-Posten, had an ongoing agitation against each other in their respective editorials, often commenting on each other and their respective positions. Indherred-Posten would also steal content from their competitor, and simply print news articles Stenkjær Avis had written, as they were simply up for grabs at their printing shop.

Amongst the founders was Joseph Sveaas. After a while it became evident he would not get the influence over the newspaper he wanted. He therefore bought the competitor Indtrønderen as well as establishing the free newspaper Stenkjær Nyheds- og Advertissemandsblad. These were not profitable businesses, but especially the latter at least succeeded at capturing large amounts of the advertisement market in Steinkjer, making finances more difficult for Stenkjær Avis. By 1896 he gave up on the operations, and sold both his printing press and the free newspaper to Stenkjær Avis. Indtrønderen was closed, briefly leaving Steinkjer with only two newspapers. The purchase took place on 11 May 1896, and Stenkjær Avis started printing at Sveaas' old printing press from 7 July.

Kokk announced on 14 October 1896 that he would resign as editor-in-chief the very same day, to pursue a position as secretary for his brother-in-law, Arctic explorer Otto Sverdrup. Richard Weigner (1873–1946), aged 23, was appointed as new editor-in-chief, a position he would hold for eleven years. He bought the newspaper and printing shop outright in 1900, and which he would own for the rest of the newspaper's history. Birger Gotaas, who would later become editor-in-chief of Stavangeren and Bergen Aftenblad, and ultimately secretary-general of the Conservative Party, started his journalist career in Stenkjær Avis.

The newspaper was struck by a typographer strike from 20 November 1907. In order to resolve the dispute, Weigner had to resign as editor-in-chief, and was replaced by Johan Kr. Wengstad (1870–1932) on 18 December 1907. The newspaper was not fully operational again until 8 January 1908. This also marked a change of scope. It declared itself as politically independent, and shifted focus to business news. Weigner returned as editor-in-chief from 21 April.

The Conservative movement was never particularly strong in and around Steinkjer, making it difficult to turn a profit with that profile. There also was not sufficient interest in a business newspaper. Weigner decided to terminate operations. He sold the assets and subscriptions to Inntrøndelagen, and several of the employees shifted to the competitor. All subscribers of Stenkjær Avis started receiving Inntrøndelagen from 15 September 1909.
