= Hjalmar Waage =

Norwegian newspaper editor and writer

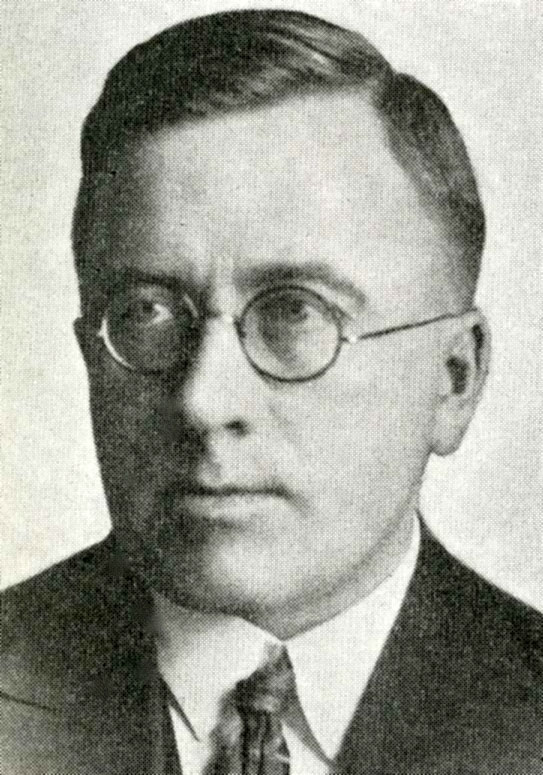
Hjalmar Waage

Hjalmar Waage (8 February 1892 – 1939) was a Norwegian newspaper editor and writer.

He was born in Bergen, and joined the Norwegian Labour Party in 1908. He became editor-in-chief of Arbeidets Ret in 1913, sub-editor of Fremtiden in 1915 before being hired in Social-Demokraten in 1920. He then edited Arbeider-Avisa from 1924 to 1925 before being hired in Arbeiderbladet. He was promoted to subeditor after a while, and edited the associated magazine Lørdagskvelden from 1935 to his death.

Waage also chaired Oslo arbeidersamfund in 1922. He was a board member of the Norwegian Press Association from 1930 to 1931.

Books include Kobbergruven (1922), Bergmændene på Storvarts (1923), Fremmede frender (1925), Mennesker underveis (1931), Vi overgir oss ikke (1934) and Veikryss (1935).

Media offices
Preceded by position created	Editor-in-chief of Arbeider-Avisa; 1924–1925	Succeeded by Ole Øisang
