= Society Party (Norway, 1930s) =

- Leader: Bertram Dybwad Brochmann
- Founder: Bertram Dybwad Brochmann
- Founded: 1933
- Dissolved: 1949
- Newspaper: Samfundsliv
- Ideology: Christian corporatism Holism
- Political position: Left-wing

The Society Party (Norwegian: Samfundspartiet) was a political party in Norway founded in 1933. The party was founded by author Bertram Dybwad Brochmann, who gained representation in the Norwegian Parliament from Bergen from 1933 to 1936. In a highly symbolic gesture, Brochmann refused to accept his salary as a member of parliament. On the background of the Great Depression, the party sought a total revision of the economic theories of the time. The party was later represented in parliament from Nordland from 1937 to 1940 (1945). The party contested its last election in the 1949 parliamentary election, and was dissolved later the same year.

== Election results ==
Storting
Date	Votes			Seats		Position	Size
Date	No.	%	± pp	No.	±	Position	Size
1933	18,786	1.50	New	1 / 150	New	Opposition	6th
1936	45,109	3.10	▲1.60	1 / 150	0	Opposition	▼5th
1945	Did not run.						
1949	13,088	0.74	▼2.36	0 / 150	0	Extra-parliamentary	▼10th
