= Johan Bernhard Andersen =

Norwegian newspaper editor (1834–1878)

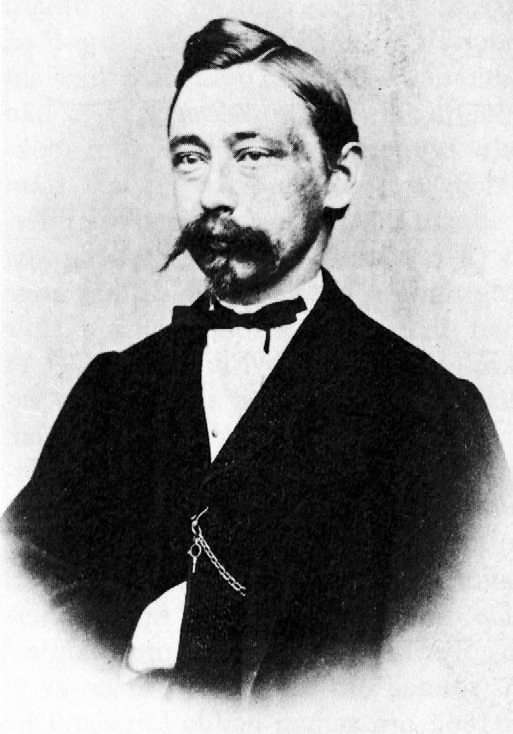
Johan Bernhard Andersen

Johan Bernhard Andersen (5 January 1834 – 28 May 1878), often written J. Bernhard Andersen, was a Norwegian printer, newspaper editor and politician. After growing up in Bergen and taking his master certificate in Oslo, he moved to Steinkjer in 1861. There he set up and ran the town's first printing press and newspaper, Indherreds-Posten. Andersen remained its owner and editor-in-chief until his death. He was also elected to the town council, sat on several public committees, and was one of the founders of the shipping company Stenkjær Dampskibsselskab.

== Personal and early life ==
Andersen was born in Bergen on 5 January 1834. His father was shoemaker Johan Andersen and his mother Helene Sophie née Køppen. His maternal grandfather was kunstdreier Henrich Köppen. At the time of his birth, the family lived in Småstrand 11, but after a year moved further out on Nordnes.

He married Karen Sophie née Torgersen in the late 1850s, while living in Christiania (Oslo). She was ten years older than him. At the time they moved to Steinkjer in 1861, they had two children, Ragna and Gudrun. Their son Fridtjof was born in 14 December 1864. Karen Sophie had a son, Axel Møller, from a previous marriage. Axel (born 13 June 1949) became a ship captain on local steamers for fifty years.

Andersen moved to Steinkjer in 1861. Initially he lived in rental accommodation in Kongens gate 1, but a few years later bought his own property in Søndre gate 60.

== Printer and editor ==
He got his trade certificate in Bergen, and then moved to Christiania in 1855, where he worked for Peter Tidemand Malling. After completing his training, he moved back to Bergen and applied for burgher rights with the intent of starting his own printing company. The permit was issued on 12 July 1861. After consultations with his old friend and peer printer Martin Knutzon, Andersen realized that Bergen would not be a good place to start yet another printing press.

He visited Steinkjer the same year. It had received its township in 1857, but did not yet have either a printing press nor a newspaper. Andersen decided that this was a better place to set up shop, and relocated there with his family later in 1861, with the intent to establish both a printing press and newspaper. Necessary royal permission for this was granted on 20 December 1861, and the first issue of Indherreds-Posted was published on 3 January 1862. Indherreds-Posten rose to become a newspaper covering the whole county of Nord-Trøndelag. It remained owned by and had Andersen as its editor-in-chief as long as was alive.

Andersen, in the role of editor, was an important factor in establish interest for politics amongst the general public. At the time suffrage was severely limited, and even amongst the few with a vote, few voted. Ahead of the 1865 parliamentary election, Andersen published a series of articles and editorials about national political issues, which contributed to a stirring interest in the general public.

== Community ==
Andersen was a member of a number of public and other committees and boards. He was elected to the town council and its executive committee, was a member of the electoral college for the parliamentary elections, sat in the committee which was able to establish Steinkjer Public Library in 1870, and later also a committee which worked on establishing a secondary school. He was one of the founders of the shipping company Stenkjær Dampskibsselskab and was particularly tied to the SS Kong Oscar.

== Death ==
Andersen announced in the paper on 28 May 1878 that his health was poor, and was affecting his work, and published his last editorial in the same issue. He passed away on 11 June 1878, aged 44. He was buried at Steinkjer Cemetery on 17 June.

Ownership of the newspaper passed to his widow, who continued to own it and managed it with various editors until 1887, when their son Fritjof Andersen took over as editor.
