= Martial law in Trondheim =

October 1942 aspect of the German occupation of Norway

During the occupation of Norway by Germany, the occupying powers imposed martial law in Trondheim and other surrounding areas, effective October 6, 1942 through October 12, 1942. During this time, 34 Norwegians were killed by extrajudicial execution. This also served as a pretext for the arrest and detention of all male Jewish inhabitants of the area as part of the Holocaust in Norway.

== Background ==
There had been several incidents of sabotage and other acts of resistance in the months leading up to the introduction of martial law, but it is likely that the shooting of two German police officers at Majavatn on September 6 enraged Josef Terboven (the German Reichskommissar for the occupation of Norway) enough to take this step. Preceding this, there had also been periods of martial law in Oslo Municipality, Asker Municipality, and Bærum Municipality from September 10 to September 16, 1941.

Some also speculate that news of the German military setbacks at the Battle of Stalingrad had reached the Norwegian resistance movement, and that German occupying powers were anxious to discourage more assertive bold moves by the resistance.

== Martial law ==
Terboven arrived by train in Trondheim on October 5. Starting on the morning of October 6, German soldiers posted red notices of "civilian martial law" all over the city. The area covered included Trondheim Municipality and the neighboring municipalities of Leinstrand, Strinda, Byneset, Orkdal, Orkanger, Orkland, Buvik, Børsa, Skaun, Geitastrand, Klæbu, Tiller, Malvik. It also included the entire county of Nord-Trøndelag, and Grane Municipality in Nordland, where the Majavatn incident took place. In addition, surrounding municipalities, such as Melhus Municipality, were subject to curfew. The conditions of martial law included a general curfew from 8 PM to 5 AM; a general prohibition against using railroads and other long-distance transportation means; and a prohibition against assembly. Violations were to be punished with no less than ten years' imprisonment at hard labor or with capital punishment. To enforce martial law, Terboven mobilized nearly 13,000 police officers, Hirdmen, and soldiers with over 3,000 vehicles.

Terboven stopped the publication of all newspapers on October 6, convening a public meeting in the main square, addressing an audience that primarily consisted of German and Norwegian police officers. He warned against "inferior racial elements" that colluded with the "emigrant clique in London," promising that he would "seize the large...those that pull the strings," and that "this evening the public will become familiar with how this principle is put into action."

== Extrajudicial executions ==
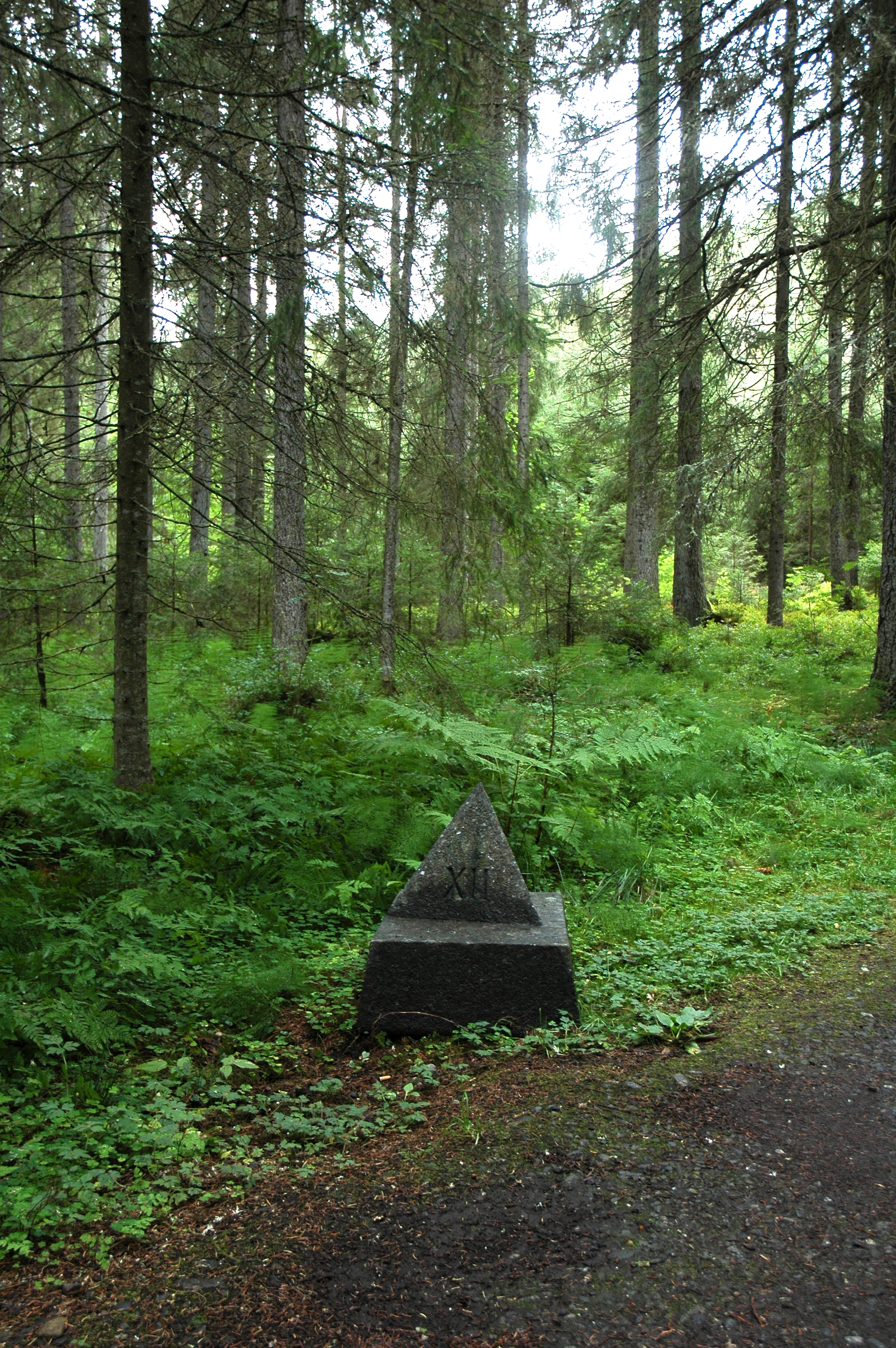
Marker over execution and burial site in Falstadskogen

That evening, Terboven announced from a loudspeaker in the main square in Trondheim that 10 prominent residents of the area had been executed as "atonement sacrifices" (soneofre) at what became the killing grounds in Falstadskogen near Falstad concentration camp, north of Trondheim at 6 PM that evening, and all their financial assets confiscated.

Those executed were:

From Trondheim, attorney Otto Skirstad, theater director Henry Gleditsch, editor Harald Langhelle, merchant Hirsch Komissar, engineer Hans Konrad Ekornes, bank president Gunnar Sandberg Birch, captain Finn Berg, and shipowner Per Tangen Lykke; attorney Bull Aakran from Røros Municipality, and construction leader Peder Eggen from Klæbu Municipality.

Eight of these were still held at the Gestapo headquarters in Misjonshotellet one block from the square and heard the announcement of their deaths. These eight were later taken by car to Falstad concentration camp, where they were joined by the remaining two for the short drive to Falstadskogen. They were bound, blindfolded, and placed two and two in front of a mass grave that had been dug that day. They were shot at short range by a firing squad of ten.

Terboven also convened a tribunal in Falstad to try individuals "hostile to the state" on October 7. Chaired by Gerhard Flesch, this tribunal condemned 15 from the municipality of Grane to death, and these were shot the following morning. An additional 9 were condemned on October 8 and executed October 9, bringing the total number of extrajudicial executions to 34.

The additional 24 executed were: Peder Stor-Tjønnli, Majavatn; Johan Audun, Bogfjellmo; Johan Øygård, Aursletta; Einar Øygård, Aursletta; Ole Sæter, Aursletta; Olaf Svebakk, Svebakk; Alf Stormo, Trofors; Oddvar Olsen Majavatn; Magnus Lien Stavasdalen; Edvard Sæter; Sæter; Peter Lund, Sæter; Arne Holmen, Holmen; Mikael Holmen, Holmen; Aksel Johansen, Østerfjorden; Ingvald Melingen, Majavatn; Tormod Tverland, Tverland; Leif Sjøfors, Holmen; Bjarne Lien, Stavassdalen; Nils Møllersen, Stavassdalen; Arne Moen, Majavatn; Agnar Blåfjellmo, Blåfjellmo; Emil Øylund, Majavatn; Peder Forbergskog, Majavatn; and Rasmus Skerpe, from Majavatn Of the 43 Norwegians executed at Falstad, 34 were killed during the martial law.

In addition to arresting a dozen or so Jewish men in the course of these days, the authorities raided 1,434 residential properties and arrested 93 individuals.

In a petty and unpopular gesture, the Norwegian county governor, Henrik Rogstad, also prohibited the sale of tobacco in Trondheim. Terboven invited to a celebratory party in his train car the evening martial law was imposed.

Martial law was lifted on October 12 when the occupying authorities determined that law and order had once again been established.

== Effects and legacy ==
Imposition of martial law in Trondheim and surrounding areas was characteristic of Terboven's "iron fist" policy of governing Norway through fear, intimidation, and capricious violence. Within a few months, most of Norway's Jews would be murdered in Auschwitz, driven underground, or to Sweden, where they sought refuge until the war ended. The arrest and deportation of political leaders into the Nacht und Nebel camps in Germany also intensified after this.

In truth, Norway was already under martial law by any conventional standard. The legally elected government was chased into exile by the invading German forces; a front government led by Vidkun Quisling was for all practical purposes completely under the control of Terboven's dictatorship. There was no freedom of the press or expression; freedom of assembly was severely curtailed; Norwegians were not free to move; the courts had become politicized; all central institutions, ranging from the Church of Norway to teachers' unions, and athletic events, were compromised in one way or another by the German authorities or Nasjonal Samling. The imposition of Terboven's version of martial law added capricious, deadly violence to make a point that was already clear to the Norwegian public.

However, it is doubtful that Terboven's measures did anything to weaken the resolve of the Norwegian resistance movement. In the remaining 2½ years of the occupation, resistance groups became more organized and coordinated, their connection with the outside world was strengthened, and public opinion against both Norwegian and German Nazi authorities stiffened.
