= Harald Langhelle =

Norwegian politician (1890–1942)

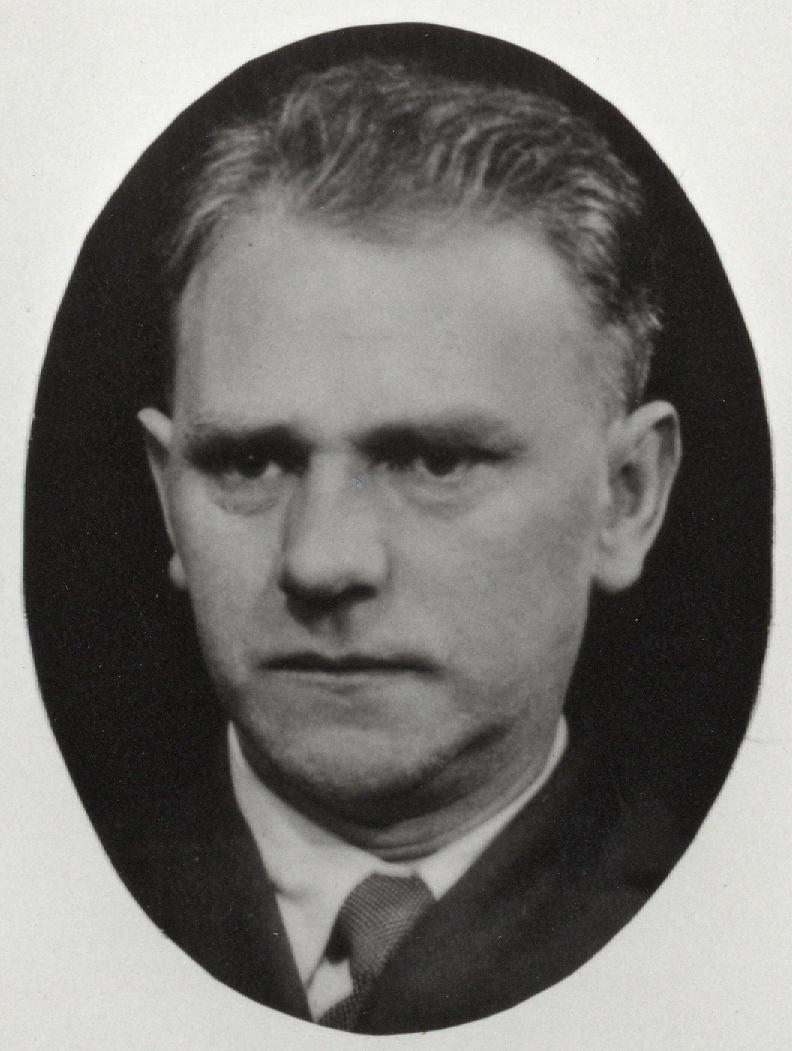

Harald H. Langhelle (25 December 1890 – 6 October 1942) was a Norwegian newspaper editor and politician for the Labour Party.

He was born in Dale, Hordaland, and became editor-in-chief of Nordlands Social-Demokrat in 1919. He was elected to the Parliament of Norway from the Market towns of Nordland, Troms and Finnmark in 1921, and sat through one term. In 1924 he moved to Trondhjem to become a journalist in Arbeider-Avisen. He was a member of the city council of Trondheim since 1935, and in 1940 he rose in the hierarchy to become editor-in-chief, succeeding Ole Øisang. The newspaper was closed in 1941, during the Occupation of Norway by Nazi Germany.

Following skirmishes in Majavatn and sabotages in Glomfjord and Malm, conducted by the Norwegian resistance movement, martial law was declared on 6 October 1942 in and around Trondheim, in Nord-Trøndelag and in Grane Municipality. In a speech held on the city square of Trondheim, Josef Terboven declared an imminent crackdown on "those who pull the strings". Harald Langhelle was executed as a propitiatory reprisal, together with theatre director Henry Gleditsch and eight other people.
