= Ingebjørg Øisang =

Norwegian politician

Ingebjørg Øisang, née Guldahl (5 May 1892 – 2 May 1956) was a Norwegian politician for the Labour Party.

She was born in Røros Municipality. In 1917 she married Ole Øisang, who had come to Røros as editor-in-chief of the local newspaper Arbeidets Rett.

She served as a deputy representative to the Norwegian Parliament from the Market towns of Sør-Trøndelag and Nord-Trøndelag counties during the terms 1934–1936, 1937–1945, 1950–1953 and 1954–1957.
