= Ole Øisang =

Norwegian politician

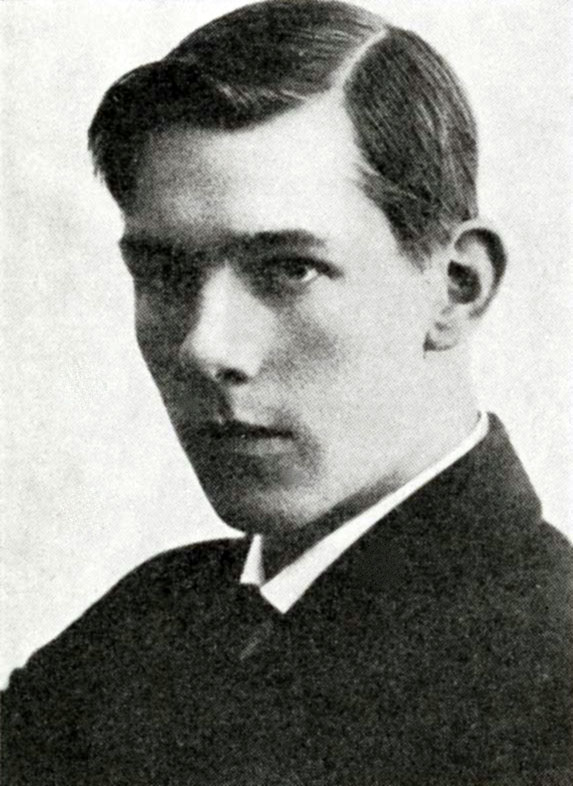
Ole Øisang

Ole Thorsen Øisang (26 April 1893 – 6 March 1963) was a Norwegian newspaper editor and politician for the Labour Party.

== Early life and career ==
Øisang was born in Risør as the son of Theodor Thorsen Kjørvik (1866–1952) and Aase Marie Øisang (1869–1898). He was originally named Ole Kjørvik, but changed his last name to Øisang some time before 1910. As he lost his mother at the age of five, he lived in Søndeled Municipality with his uncle and aunt. Øisang graduated from middle school in Kristiansand in 1910 and started his journalistic career as a subeditor in Sørlandets Socialdemokrat in 1912.

== Political and professional career ==
In 1915, Øisang was hired as the editor-in-chief of the Røros newspaper Arbeidets Rett. In Røros he met Ingebjørg Guldahl, whom he married in October 1917. Øisang then became the editor-in-chief of Vestfold Arbeiderblad in 1918 and of Sørlandet in 1920. He also published pamphlets and books, including Klassesamfundets historie. Den sociale utvikling indtil industrialismens gjennembrud (1922) and Marxismens grunntrekk (1926). Øisang has been elected into the national board of the Norwegian Labour Party in 1918, and served as a deputy representative to the Norwegian Parliament from the Market towns of Vest-Agder and Rogaland counties during the term 1925–1927. During the Labour Party turbulence in the 1920s, which saw the Social Democratic Labour Party and the Communist Party break away, Øisang tried to build bridges between the rival fractions. When this attempt failed, he remained with Labour. He was rewarded with the job as editor-in-chief of Arbeider-Avisa. Øisang was known for lambasting the Communist Party in his editorials, especially the rival newspaper Ny Tid which was edited by Jørgen Vogt. In 1928 Øisang was elected to serve as a member of the municipal council of Trondheim Municipality.

In the 1930s, Øisang was a key figure in developing the political platform for the Labour Party, having taken a reformist stance in the 1920s. He also continued in local politics, chairing the city school board from 1938. Øisang stepped down as editor of Arbeider-Avisa in 1940 as he in 1939 had been elected as party secretary of the Labour Party; his successor was Harald Langhelle. However, things were hampered by the Nazi German invasion and subsequent occupation of Norway. First, Øisang represented the Labour Party in the negotiations about administration of Norway after the invasion, as the cabinet Nygaardsvold had fled the country. However, the negotiations were not fruitful, and in September 1940 all political parties except for Nasjonal Samling were banned. The newspaper Arbeider-Avisa was shut down in 1941, and Harald Langhelle was executed following the martial law in Trondheim in 1942. Øisang, who had spent the occupation period writing books on local history, was arrested on 9 October 1944, was incarcerated at Vollan and then sent to Berg concentration camp a few weeks later. He was released in April 1945, one month before the liberation of Norway.

After the occupation, Øisang returned to local politics and the now-vacant seat as editor of Arbeider-Avisa. He also resumed his work on the school board. The position as party secretary was taken over for a short period by Trygve Bratteli, and then by Haakon Lie. Øisang continued publishing books; his last book was on the history of Trøndelag Teater, released 1962. His wife Ingebjørg died in 1956, and in February 1962 Øisang married again, this time to Kristine Bauck, who was the widow of Stig Bauck (1893–1951) and daughter of well-known newspaper editor Knut Olai Thornæs. Øisang left both the editor position and the school board in 1958, and continued working in Arbeider-Avisa from 1958 to his death in 1963.

== Selected works ==
- Den faglige kamp, 1915
- Klassesamfundets historie. Den sociale utvikling indtil industrialismens gjennembrud, 1922
- Marxismens grunntrekk, 1926
- Kampen for folkestyret, 1933
- Vi vil oss et land –. Arbeiderbevegelsen og det nasjonale spørsmål, 1937
- Teater i Trondheim gjennom 125 år, 1941
- Malernes forening i Trondheim 1893 – 17. april – 1943, 1943
- Røros Kobberverks historie, 1946
- Arbeiderpressen i Trøndelag, 1950
- Veien til boken. Skjønnlitteraturen i opplysningsarbeidet, 1951
- Kjørvik- og Øisang-slekten i Søndeled, 1957
- Trøndelag Teater gjennom 25 år, 1962

Party political offices
Preceded by Einar Gerhardsen	Party secretary of the Labour Party; 1939–1945	Succeeded by Trygve Bratteli
Media offices
Preceded by Hjalmar Waage	Editor-in-chief of Arbeider-Avisa; 1926–1940	Succeeded by Harald Langhelle
Vacant World War II Title last held by Harald Langhelle in 1942	Editor-in-chief of Arbeider-Avisa; 1945–1958	Succeeded by Eigil Gullvåg
