= Bertram Dybwad Brochmann =

Norwegian politician

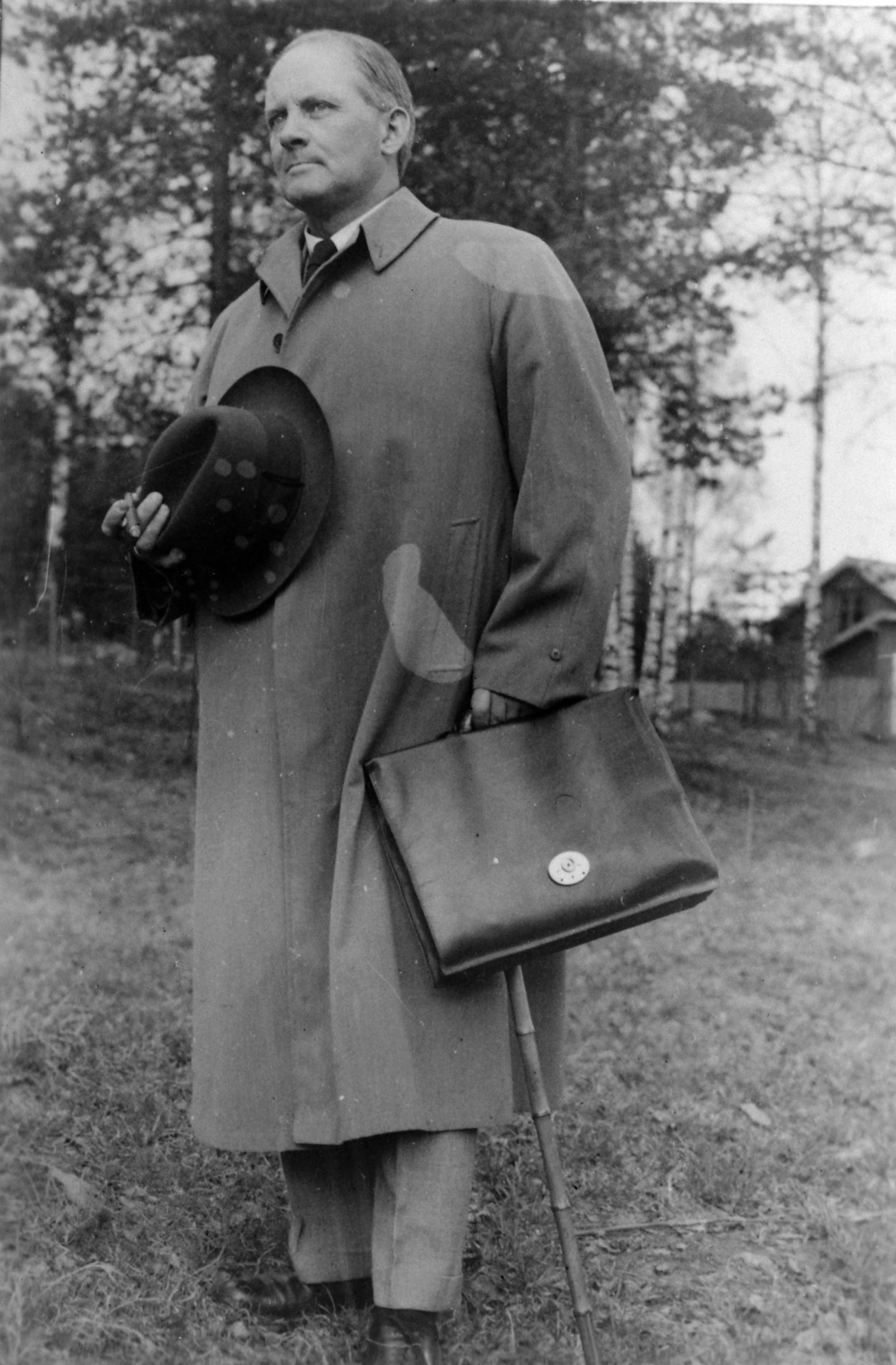
- Born: 1 January 1881; Grue, Norway
- Died: 15 January 1956 (aged 75)
- Occupations: Businessperson, writer and politician

Bertram Dybwad Brochmann (1 January 1881 – 15 January 1956) was a Norwegian businessperson, writer and politician, founder of the Society Party.

He was born in Grue as a son of Jørgen Henrik Hegermann Brochmann (1850–1921) and Sophie Wilhelmine Dybwad (1858–1892). He was a nephew of Bertram Elias Dybwad, and on the paternal side a first cousin of Georg Brochmann.

In 1931, Brochmann began the magazine Samfundsliv. He formed the Samfundspartiet ("The Society Party") two years later. Brochmann's movement touted the fundamental evils of capitalism, State power, and organized religion.

He was elected to the Parliament of Norway in 1933, serving the period 1934 to 1936.

Although Brochmann was opposed to anti-Semitism and eugenics, he gave a radio speech and published a pamphlet to rally Norwegian support for "Hitler's revolution". After the war, these contributed to his conviction for treason.
