= Arbeider-Avisa =

Norwegian daily newspaper

- Type: Daily newspaper
- Format: Tabloid
- Owner: A-Pressen
- Editor-in-chief: See text.
- Founded: 15 March 1924
- Ceased publication: 27 February 1996
- Political alignment: Social democrat (Labour)
- Language: Norwegian
- Headquarters: Trondheim, Norway
- Circulation: 11,000

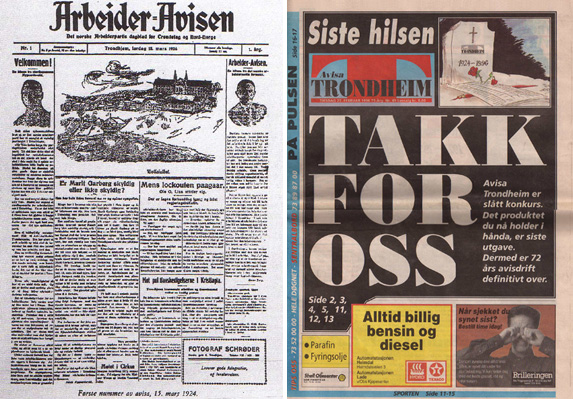
First and last issues of Arbeider-Avisa

Arbeider-Avisa (founded as Arbeider-Avisen, from 1946 Arbeider-Avisa, from 1993 Avisa Trondheim) was a daily newspaper published in Trondheim, Norway, started in 1924 and defunct in 1996. Until 1989 it was officially the newspaper for the Norwegian Labour Party.

== History ==
=== Born from party split ===
The newspaper was born as a consequence of the split of the Labour Party in the fall of 1923. Unlike in most of the country, there was a Communist majority in the local party organisation in Trondheim, and the newly formed Norwegian Communist Party, secured the party's assets, including the party newspaper Ny Tid, established in 1899. Among the most known staff in Ny Tid was Martin Tranmæl. The Labour Party in Trondheim prioritised the work to establish a new newspaper, and at the annual meeting it created an extra member fee for the purpose. A new newspaper was published on 15 March 1924 under the name Arbeider-Avisen - organ for the Norwegian Labour Party. The paper had its headquarters in Trondheim. Within the party many regarded the newspaper as a direct succession of Ny Tid.

Trøndelag Social-Demokrat, established by the Social Democratic Labour who had left the Labour Party during the first party split in 1917, was merged into Arbeider-Avisen in 1927. At the same time, the Social Democrats were merged into Labour. Later the newspaper Folkets Rett in Levanger was merged with Arbeider-Avisen, making it a pan-Trøndelag newspaper. In 1939 Ny Tid lost the struggle against Arbeider-Avisen and became defunct. Arbeider-Avisen had prospered after the cabinet Nygaardsvold, led by Johan Nygaardsvold from Trøndelag, assumed national office.

=== Stopped during the war ===
During World War II and the German occupation of Norway the entire media environment in Trondheim changed. At the start of the war the city had four daily newspapers, the largest being Dagsposten (15,000 issues) followed by the conservative Adresseavisen (15,000 issues), Arbeider-Avisen (10,000 issues) and the liberal Nidaros (10,000 issues).

Arbeider-Avisen continued to come out during the war, but soon met problems. In article and editorials there were clear stands in cases that were in conflict with the German interests, resulting in that the newspaper was stopped for shorter or longer periods. The first such stop occurred on 30 August 1940 and the newspaper was stopped for six days. The punishment came after a small notice from a municipal council debate in Leksvik Municipality under the title "Someone who doesn't give up". Under the real message was added: "We have taken under doubt to increase the line distance so the readers better can read between the lines". The final stop order came on 29 January 1941 when German and Norwegian police met up at Adresseavisen's printing press where Arbeider-Avisen was printed and wrecked the printed pages with a sledgehammer. The three other Trondheim newspapers barely mentioned the event with a small notice from central authorities: "Arbeider-Avisen has lately repeatedly published articles and messages that only has had the intention of giving an unwanted influence on the newspaper's readers, and by that evading civil obedience, at the same time it is damaging the work that Norwegian and German authorities are conducting in cooperation. The stop was intended to last only four weeks, but instead lasted throughout the entire war. The newspaper's editor Harald Langhelle was in October 1942 arrested and executed as one of ten after a sabotage at Fosdalen Mines in Malm Municipality.

=== The end of the war ===
When the peace came on 8 May 1945, Trondheims-Pressen was launched, a common newspaper created by Adresseavisen, Arbeider-Avisen and Nidaros. It was produced at Adresseavisen after press from the resistance, who wanted to avoid to much unfair competition because of the many newspapers that were stopped during the war. But on 14 May the ordinary newspapers were back on the street, each with about 30,000 issues. Dagsposten was not part of the project, the newspaper had voluntarily been nazified during the war and did not survive the peace. The Christian Dagsavisa was established in the ruins of Dagsposten and survived about ten years. In light of communisms newgained popularity Ny Tid was published again for two years, before being closed again. Addresseavisen had during the war taken over both advertisers and subscribers who had fled from Dagsposten.

While Adresseavisen and to a certain extent Nidaros had intact production equipment, Arbeider-Avisa stated with nothing. Not even a pencil was left after the Germany occupants had cleansed the offices. But thanks to hard work from former employees and not least the labour unions, the newspaper could again start production, layout and printed at Adresseavisen, with Ole Øisang back as editor. Adresseavisen was convicted, as part of the newspaper trials after the war, to pay a compensation of NOK 600,000 to all newspapers. Despite this, it did not take many days after the war to see that Adresseavisen had won the newspaper war. In 1947 Arbeider-Avisa (21.400) had half the number of subscribers as Adresseavisen (41.000).

=== Post-war ===
After the war Arbeider-Avisa had three major developments. The number of issues fell, costs exceeding income and the removal of the church journalism. In 1964 the newspaper merged with Namdal Arbeiderblad in the company A/S Trønderpresse and some time later with Stjørdalens Blad to strengthen the economy, something that also happened. The two other newspapers were demerged in the 1970s and 90s respectively.

Arbeider-Avisa was an innovative newspaper when it came to technology. Early in the 1970s it converted to tabloid format at the same time it started printing in offset at its own press. In 1974 it became a morning newspaper, but this was not a success since Adresseavisen was well established in the morning market. In the middle of the 1980s the newspaper was one of the first in Norway were the journalists wrote the articles directly into computers.

Only once, in 1971, has the newspaper been close to the target issue number of 20,000, right before the 1972 Norwegian European Communities membership referendum. Editor Eigil Gullvåg took a stand for Norwegian EEC membership, unlike most of the opinion in Central Norway and among the newspapers readers and the growth was changed to decline. Norsk Arbeiderpresse (now A-Pressen) went into the ownership of Arbeider-Avisa in the late 1980s and declared the newspaper a priority area, but neither this put an end to the rumours of an imminent death. Editor Terje Dalen lead the first dramatic cut-back and 30 prosent of the employees had to quit in 1989. After 45 years in Folkets Hus in Midtbyen Arbeider-Avisa moved the offices and press to a new building in Lade in 1990 under leadership of editor Bjørn Stuevold. In Folkets Hus in the city centre the offices had grown so much it had been in four floors, connected through labyrinths of corridors.

=== Last years ===
In 1993 the newspaper changed name to Avisa Trondheim at the same time it moved back to the city centre. On the owner side there had been a small revolution as Student Welfare Organisation in Trondheim (SiT) and Norske Aller became coowners of the multimedia corporation through a cooperation with Radio 1 and Norsk Arbeiderpresse. A major refinancing was to insure the newspaper a good economy without debt. As part of the agreement SiT was to buy between three 2,000 and 3,000 subscriptions and give these onwards to its students, an agreement that met large resistance among the students and was quickly abolished.

A refinancing in the fall of 1994 was successful, where the competitor Adresseavisen was part. The year later all the employees in the newspaper were fired and asked to apply to new jobs in the newspaper in an attempt to reduce the number of employees and save money. But the losses continued, among others because of the reduction in sold newspapers. Just at the end of the newspapers life the owners in A-Pressen asked Adresseavisen if they wanted joint ownership in the company, but before they answered A-Pressen declared the newspaper bankrupt. The last issue came out on 27 February 1996 with 11,036 issues. Repeated attempts to start again failed. But after the bankruptcy was processed most of the creditors got their assets back. Arbeiderbladet bought the subscriber list while the Norwegian Labour Movement Archives and Library bought the archive.

=== Revival as Arbeideravisa ===
In January 2008, the newspaper resumed publication under the name Arbeideravisa. However, it only lasted until August the same year.

== Editors ==
- Hjalmar Waage 1924–1925
- Ole Øisang 1925–1940
- Harald Langhelle 1940–1942
- Ole Øisang 1945–1958
- Eigil Gullvåg 1958–1983
- Terje Dalen 1983–1990
- Bjørn Stuevold 1990–1992
- Randi Rassmussen 1992–1995
- Torgeir Winnberg 1995–1996
