= Indtrønderen =

Norwegian newspaper (1883–1896)

- Founder: Paul Christian Andresen
- Editor: Paul Christian Andresen (1883–1894)
- Founded: 5 April 1883; 143 years ago
- Ceased publication: 1 July 1896; 130 years ago
- Political alignment: Liberal Party
- Language: Norwegian
- City: Steinkjer
- Country: Norway

Indtrønderen was a newspaper published in Steinkjer, Norway, from 5 April 1883 to 1 July 1896. It was for most of its history published three days a week, but ran as a daily newspaper between 1890 and 1894, when it changed its name to Stenkjær Dagblad. From the onset to 1894 it was edited by Paul Christian Andresen, and was associated with the Liberal Party.

== History ==
Indtrønderen was the second newspaper to be published in Steinkjer, after Indhereds-Posten, which had been founded in 1862. Printer Paul Christian Andresen, who originally hailed from Flekkefjord, observed that there was a large appetite for political news around Steinkjer, but that Indhereds-Posten failed to write much about politics. He therefore moved to Steinkjer to start a more politically-oriented newspaper. Andresen had moved to Levanger in 1873 and set up a printing company in conjunction with Nordenfjeldske Tidende. The printing press burned in 1879 and he moved to Stjørdalshalsen and set up a printing shop there. He then moved to Steinkjer in 1883 and established a printing company along with the newspaper.

The establishment of Indtrønderen was backed by the Liberal Party and its two parliamentarians Ole Anton Qvam and Nicolay Martens. The first issue came out on 5 April 1883 with Andresen as editor-in-chief. It initially came out twice a week, on Mondays and Thursday. It later came out three times a week, on Tuesdays, Thursdays and Saturdays.

Andresen was regarded as a competent editor, and the newspaper soon became popular, especially amongst farmers. Indhereds-Posten became increasingly positioned with the Conservative Party, leading to political tensions between the two. One consequence of this was increased participation in the elections.

By 1890, Indtrønderen was going so well that it increased to a daily circulation. It changed its name to Stenkjær Dagblad while publishing daily. However, there was increased competition from the newly established Indhereds Tidende, and by 1894 the daily publications ceased, and the name reverted to Indtrønderen. The expansion had not gone without costs, and Andresen went personally bankrupt in 1894. The newspaper and printing shop were sold to Joseph Sveaas. He hired Jon Engum as editor. But this only lasted a short period, and by late 1894 the newspaper stood without a named editor. Sveaas eventually sold the newspaper and printing shop to Stenkjær Avis on 11 May 1896. The last issue of Indtrønderen was published on 1 July 1896.
