= Ofotens Tidende =

Norwegian online newspaper

- Type: Online newspaper
- Owner: Harstad Tidende
- Ceased publication: 2000 (print)
- Relaunched: 2007 (online only)
- Language: Norwegian
- Headquarters: Narvik, Norway
- Circulation: 3,606 (2000)
- Website: www.ofotenstidende.no

Ofotens Tidende is an online newspaper published in Narvik, Norway. From 1899 to 2000, Ofotens Tidende was a Conservative newspaper owned by Harstad Tidende. In the last year of publication, it had a circulation of 3,606, compared to the competitor Fremover's 10,114. It reappeared as a pure online newspaper in 2007.
