= 1865 Norwegian parliamentary election =

- February–6 June 1865

All 111 seats in the Storting 56 seats needed for a majority
- Registered: 80,888
- Turnout: 41.82%
Prime Minister before election
Frederik Gottschalck Haxthausen Due
Prime Minister after election
Frederik Gottschalck Haxthausen Due

Parliamentary elections were held in Norway in 1865. As political parties were not officially established until 1884, all those elected were independents. The number of seats in the Storting remained at 111, the first time it had been unchanged since 1823. Voter turnout was 42%, although only 5% of the country's population was eligible to vote.

== Results ==
Of the 111 seats, 52 were won by farmers, sheriffs, church singers and teachers, 35 by civil servants and 24 by people with other professions.

Party	Votes	%	Seats
Independents			111
Total			111
Total votes	33,831	–	
Registered voters/turnout	80,888	41.82	
Source: Nohlen & Stöver, NSSDS
