= Fridtjof Andersen =

Norwegian editor

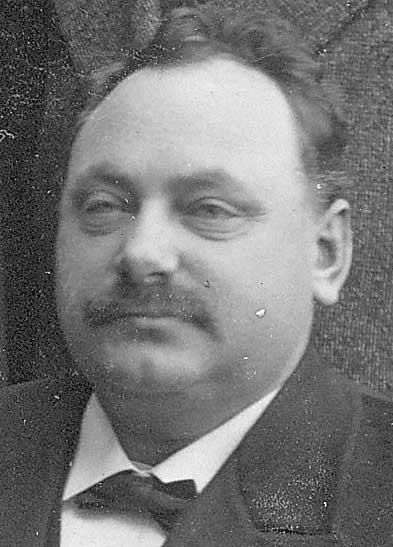
Fridtjof Andersen

Fridtjof Andersen (14 December 1864 – 9 February 1927) was a Norwegian newspaper editor and printer from Steinkjer. He took over as editor-in-chief and later owner of the newspaper Indherreds-Posten in 1891, which he had inherited from his father and founder Johan Bernhard Andersen. Fridtjof took the newspaper in a much more liberal and then radical direction, making it the most dominant newspaper in Nord-Trøndelag for its era. He started a cinema in 1910, but as he aged his finances became increasingly poor. He sold the newspaper in 1916.

== Early and personal life ==
Fridtjof Andersen was born on 14 December 1864 in Steinkjer. His father was editor Johan Bernhard Andersen and his mother Karen Sofie née Torgersen. He was the half-brother of prominent ship captain Axel Møller. He married twice. The first resulted in a son. The second marriage was with Pauline née Normann, with whom he had one son and two daughters. Pauline had also been married before, from which she had a son.

== Editor ==
The son of Johan Bernhard Andersen, the founder of Indherreds-Posten, Fridtjof followed in his father's footsteps and trained as a printer. He was only 13 when his father died, on 11 June 1878, and management of the newspaper was taken over by his mother. Andersen trained as a printer and typographer in Namsos at the newspaper Nordtrønderen, before returning to Steinkjer in 1887.

Indherreds-Posten was struggling financially upon his return. It had aligned with the Conservative Party, which had resulted in a sharp decline in readership. Along with his mother, Andersen realigned the newspaper in a more liberal direction. In 1891 he took over as editor-in-chief, a position he would retain until 1916.

Andersen was part of a wider movement of radical young people which was on the rise during the 1890s. Like these, he was a vocal pacifist and supported the labor movement. Compared to previous editors, he moved Indherreds-Posten to the left politically. For instance he made "universal suffrage and direct taxation" the newspaper's slogan.

Steinkjer was a garrison town, with Steinkjersannan a major employer. Several of the editorials in the newspaper were by these regarded as so libelous that they resulted in Andersen being court-martialed. This tended to raise his regarded amongst pacifist, who saw him standing guard to defend the free press. He was also opposed to the military budget increases, which caused friction with the Liberal Party, with whom his newspaper was officially aligned. In 1896 he would pivot completely in the military issue, and in 1905 he signed up for military service in conjunction with the dissolution of the union between Norway and Sweden.

== Financial decline and death ==
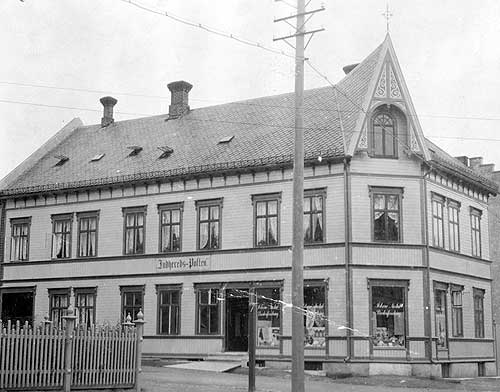
Indherreds-Posten's offices, the debt of which would eventually ruin Andersen

In the 1900 town fire, Andersen's property in Sørsia was one of the few which survived unscathed. Yet he chose to buy a lot in Kongens gate and build a property for his operations. This was largely funded through debt, which he struggled to pay. His operations went into decline in the following years. In the early 1910s, he moved the printing press to back room and rebuilt the main room as a cinema. Indherreds-Posten was sold to the Labor Democrats in 1916.

He died a broke man on 9 February 1927, aged 63.
