= Steinkjersannan =

Neighborhood in Steinkjer, Norway

Coordinates: 64°00′36″N 11°30′15″E

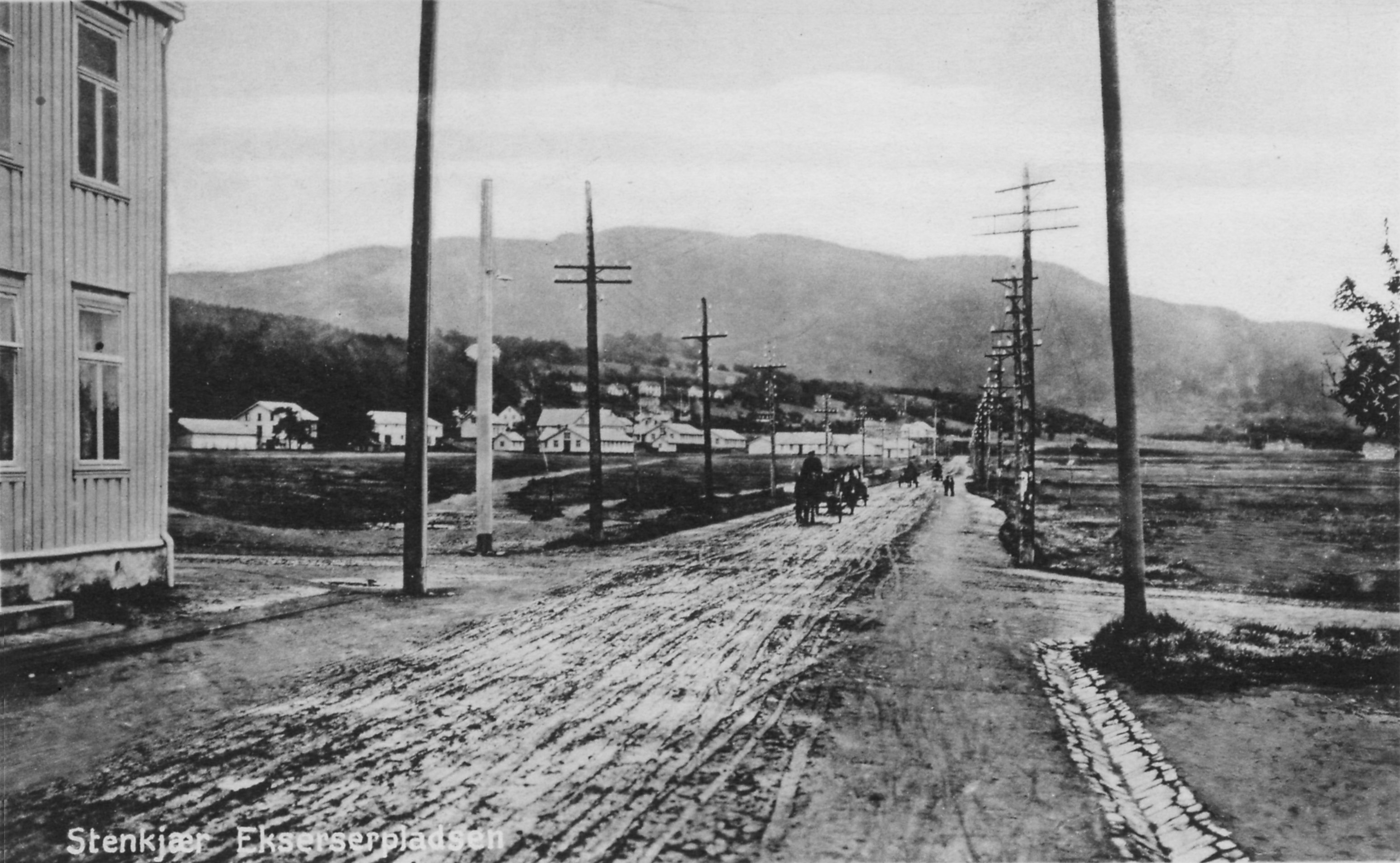
Steinkjersannan, before 1910

Steinkjersannan or Sannan is a neighborhood of town of Steinkjer in Steinkjer Municipality in Trøndelag county, Norway. From the 17th century until the 2005, the area was used as a military camp.
