= Stjørdalens Blad =

Norwegian newspaper

- Type: Daily newspaper
- Owner: A-pressen
- Editor: Geir Olav Flåan
- Founded: 1892
- Circulation: 7634
- Website: www.bladet.no

Stjørdalens Blad is a local newspaper published in Stjørdal, Norway. It covers Stjørdal Municipality and Meråker Municipality. It was established in 1892.

It has a circulation of 7634, of whom 7023 are subscribers.

Stjørdalens Blad is owned by A-pressen Lokale Medier AS, which in turn is owned 100% by A-pressen.
