= Inntrøndelagen =

Norwegian newspaper

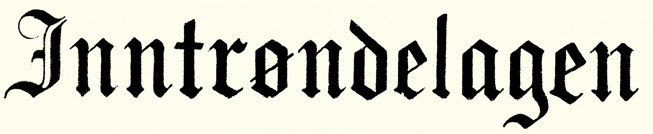
- Founder: Jan Engum
- Founded: 19 November 1897; 128 years ago
- Ceased publication: 21 April 1940; 86 years ago
- Political alignment: Liberal Party
- Language: Norwegian
- City: Steinkjer
- Country: Norway

Inntrøndelagen was a newspaper published in Steinkjer, Norway, between 19 November 1897 and 21 April 1940.

The newspaper was founded as Mjølner by Jan Engum, and by 1900 it was the largest newspaper in Steinkjer. It took the name Indtrøndelagen as a reboot after its facilities burned down in 1900, and its ultimate name in 1922 due to changes in orthography. The newspaper was bought by a group of Liberal Party members in 1922, after which it was aligned with that party.

Operations cesased in 1940 after the bombing of Steinkjer. After that it was jointly published with Nord-Trøndelag in what became Trønder-Avisa in 1952. As a holding company LL Inntrøndelagen remained until 2023, when it's share of Trønder-Avisa was bought by Polaris Media.

== History ==
=== Mjølner ===
The newspaper had its debut on 19 November 1897, initially named Mjølner. It was founded by Jon Engum (31 July 1865 – 2 February 1950), who was also the newspaper's first editor. This was Engum's first foray into journalism; the Følling native had previously for the most part work as a teacher. Mjølner marketed itself as a voice for farmers and workers.

Kristofer Uppdal, who would become a prominent writer and poet, was a contributor to Mjølner from the first edition, both with poems and with articles. Mjølner was quite popular from the onset, and from the beginning of 1899 had already reach a circulation 1194, making it the largest newspaper not only in Steinkjer, but the whole district.

In early 1900 the newspaper bought their own offices in Sørsia and a printing press which was installed in the office. Self-printing started on 1 May 1900. Sørsia and the newspaper's facilities burned down in the 1900 Steinkjer fire on 15 August 1900. After the fire, the offices were moved across the river to Nordsia, where offices were set up in Grønne gate, and took the name Indtrøndelagen. It bought the Conservative newspaper Stenkjær Avis in 1908, and incorporated it into Indtrøndelagen from 1 January 1909.

=== Inntrøndelagen ===
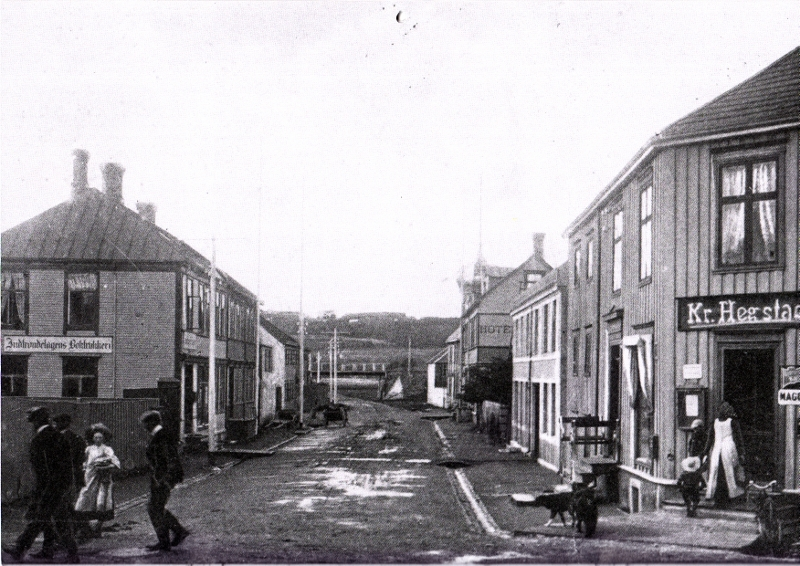
Indtrøndelagen''s offices in Grønne gade in 1913

Amund Wendelbo and Jakob Hellen bought the newspaper through a newly created joint company, which took over operations of the newspaper in 1909. With this Engum withdrew from the operations. Until 1922, the newspaper had six consecutive editors: Michael B. Olsen (1909–12), Johannes Kjesbu (1912–18), Nils Urdal, John A. Schefte, Bjarne Wendelbo og Edvard Vekre.

The Liberal Party did not at the time have a newspaper in Steinkjer, and in 1921 a group of Liberal Party members started discussions about establishing such a newspaper. They offered to buy Indtrøndelagen, but Wendelbo and Hellen demanded 250 thousand kroner, which was too much for the potential investors. Already the next year, in 1922, Wendelbo's business empire collapsed with the bankruptcy of his Stenkjær Privatbank. Indtrøndelagen also declared bankruptcy in the fallout. The Liberal Party investors bought the newspaper operations from the estate, and established the company LL Inntrøndelagen to own and operate the newspaper. The company was formally established on 4 January 1923 with an equity of 50 thousand kroner. Party loyalist A. Hjellebakke was hired as editor in 1922, before being replaced by Olav Hougen in 1926. The newspaper changed its spelling from Indtrøndelagen to Inntrøndelagen in 1922, due to changes in the spelling norms.

=== Trønder-Avisa ===
Steinkjer was bombed on 21 April 1940 at the onset of the Second World War. Both the press and offices of both Inntrøndelagen and its main competitor, Nord-Trøndelag og Nordenfjeldsk Tidende, were bombed. In able to continue operations, the two joined forces, and from 29 May came out as Nord-Trøndelag & Inntrøndelagen. The long name caused it to be known colloqually as Fellesavisa ("The Common Paper"). The German occupation forces removed Hougen as editor in 1942, and he died the following year. The cooperation was made permanent from 1952, when the newspaper changed its name to Trønder-Avisa.

From 1959, Trønder-Avisa was organized a joint Agrarian Party (later Center Party) and Liberal Party newspaper. The holding companies AS Nord-Trøndelag and LL Inntrøndelagen owned each their share of the newspaper, and each of these to companies were to be owned by party loyalists. Each owner company would appoint each their respective party-loyal editor. These would be joint editors-in-chief, and write the editorial every other day. This mechanism was in force until 1996, when Trønder-Avisa officially became party-neutral.

The Liberal Party split in two in 1972. This meant that the ownership of LL Inntrøndelagen was now held by loyalists to two different parties, and caused problems with which party the editor should belong to. The annual meeting removed the board in 1973, following the sale of 13 percent of the shares by Jo Five. The issue was eventually resolved in 1989 when those shares were sold to Dagbladet.

In 2010, Trønder-Avisa signed a strategic partnership with Polaris Media. This meant that Polaris secured a ten-percent direct ownership of the newspaper, reducing LL Inntrøndelagen's ownership to 38 percent. A concern at the time was that Polaris also owned Trønder-Avisa's main regional rival, Adresseavisen. Around 2020, Amedia started buying up a large number of shares in LL Inntrøndelag, and Trønder-Avisa signed a strategic agreement with Amedia. Polaris Media belived they had the right to buy these shares, and sued. After two rounds in court and an out-of-court settlement, Polaris Media was secured the right to buy all shares of LL Inntrøndelagen. This ended up with the dissolution of LL Inntrøndelagen in 2023 and its ownership transferred to Polaris Media. After the settlement, AS Nord-Trøndelag retains a 65-percent ownership of Trønder-Avisa, while Polaris Media owns 35 percent.

== Holding company ==
LL Inntrøndelagen was after 1952 a pure holding company which owned part of Trønder-Avisa. It had 1500 shares, and had 236 individual owners as of 2016. The statutes for the company regulated who was allowed to own shares. Any owner of shares was free to negotiate prices for the shares, but the purchaser had to be approved of by the board. The statutes demanded that any owner agreed to the purpose provision of the company. In reality, anyone buying shares would have to have been a good-faith member of the Liberal Party for the past two years.
