= Skogn Municipality =

Former municipality in Trøndelag, Norway

Skogn Municipality Skogn herred
- Former municipality
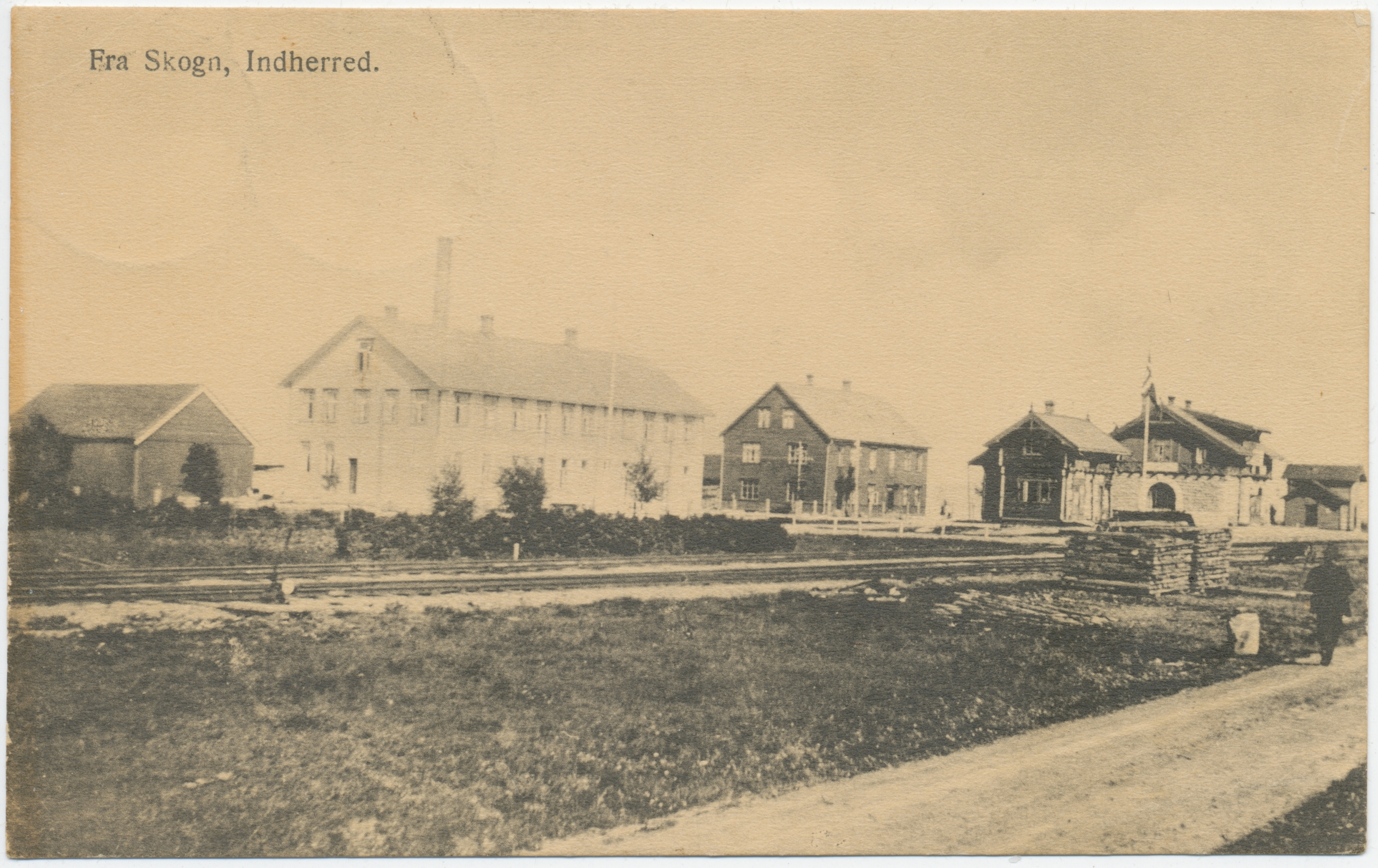
- View of the area around the Skogn Station (c. 1920)

- Nord-Trøndelag within Norway

- Skogn within Nord-Trøndelag
- Coordinates: 63°42′03″N 11°11′12″E
- Country: Norway
- County: Nord-Trøndelag
- District: Innherred
- Established: 1 Jan 1838
  - Created as: Formannskapsdistrikt
- Disestablished: 1 Jan 1962
  - Succeeded by: Levanger Municipality
- Administrative centre: Skogn

Government
  - Mayor (1961-1961): Odin Vist (Ap)

Area (upon dissolution)
  - Total: 340.1 km^{2} (131.3 sq mi)
  - Rank: #261 in Norway
- Highest elevation: 735.35 m (2,412.6 ft)

Population (1961)
  - Total: 4,779
  - Rank: #176 in Norway
  - Density: 14.1/km^{2} (37/sq mi)
  - Change (10 years): ▲ +8.1%
- Demonym: Skogning

Official language
  - Norwegian form: Neutral
- Time zone: UTC+01:00 (CET)
  - Summer (DST): UTC+02:00 (CEST)
- ISO 3166 code: NO-1719

Skogn is a former municipality in the old Nord-Trøndelag county, Norway. The 340-square-kilometre (130 sq mi) municipality existed from 1838 until its dissolution in 1962. The municipality was located to the south and southwest of the town of Levanger in what is now Levanger Municipality in Trøndelag county. The administrative centre was the village of Skogn.

Prior to its dissolution in 1962, the 340-square-kilometre (130 sq mi) municipality was the 261st largest by area out of the 731 municipalities in Norway. Skogn Municipality was the 176th most populous municipality in Norway with a population of about 4,779. The municipality's population density was 14.1 inhabitants per square kilometre (37/sq mi) and its population had increased by 8.1% over the previous 10-year period.

== General information ==
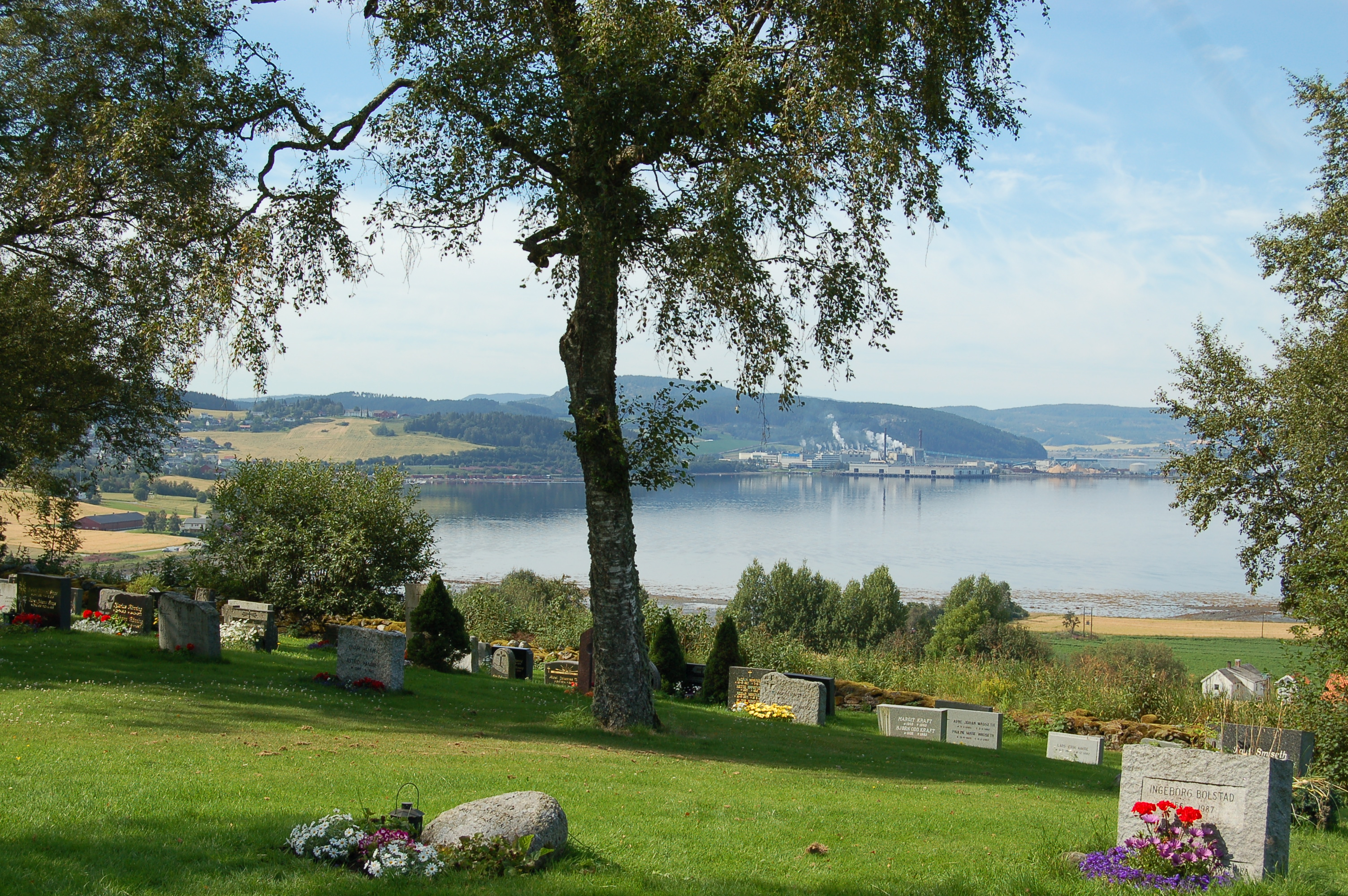
View of the shore near Alstadhaug Church

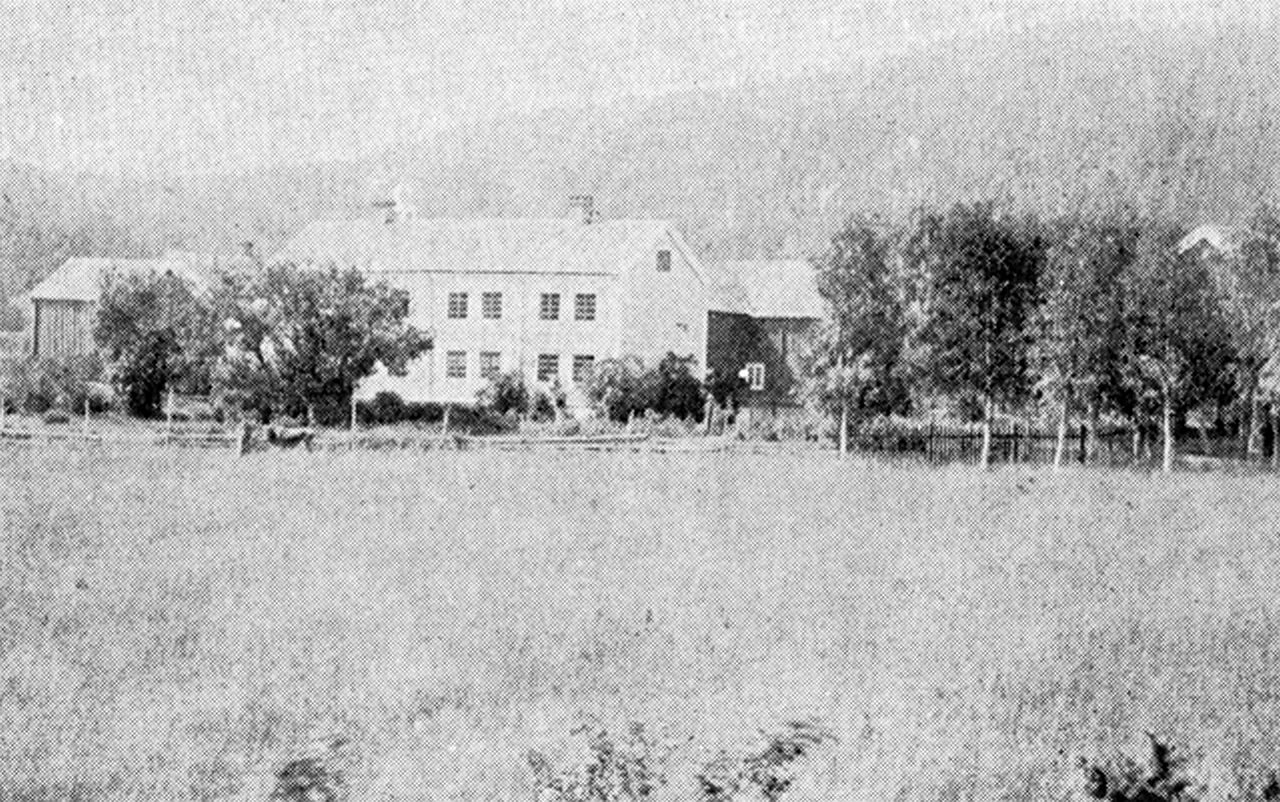
View of the Falstad farm (c. 1890)

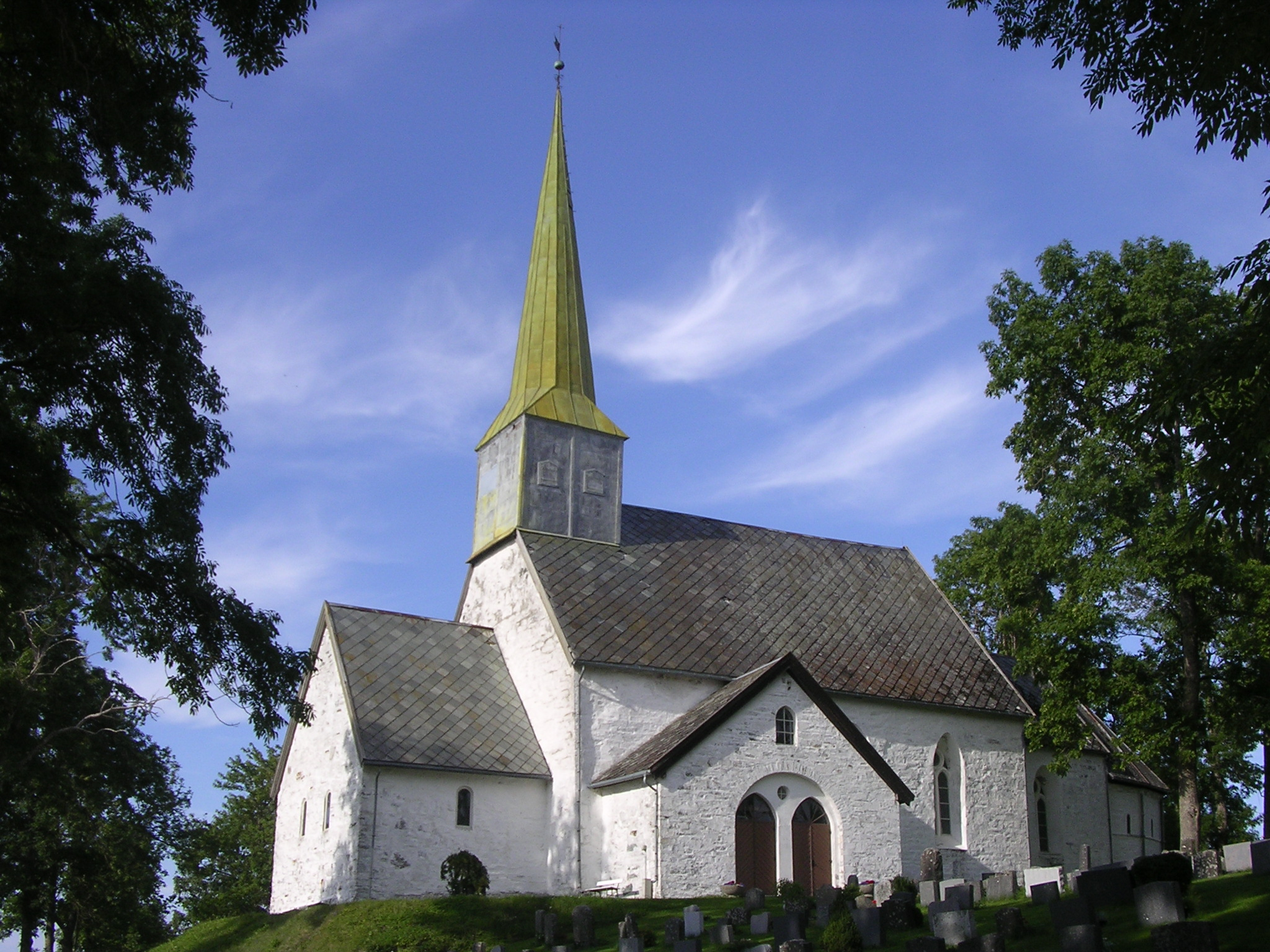
Alstadhaug Church

The prestegjeld of Skogn was established as a municipality on 1 January 1838 (see formannskapsdistrikt law). On 28 November 1874, a royal resolution moved two uninhabited parts of Skogn Municipality to the neighboring Levanger landsogn.

During the 1960s, there were many municipal mergers across Norway due to the work of the Schei Committee. On 1 January 1962, the town of Levanger (population: 1,669) was merged with the neighboring Frol Municipality (population: 3,774), Åsen Municipality (population: 1,939), and Skogn Municipality (population: 4,756) to form a new, larger Levanger Municipality.

=== Name ===
The municipality (originally the parish) is named after the old name for the area (Old Norse: Skaun). The name comes from the word skaun which means "beautiful" or "lovely" (similar to the German word schön).

=== Churches ===
The Church of Norway had one parish (sokn) within Skogn Municipality. At the time of the municipal dissolution, it was part of the Skogn prestegjeld and the Sør-Innherad prosti (deanery) in the Diocese of Nidaros.

Churches in Skogn Municipality
Parish (sokn)	Church name	Location of the church	Year built
Alstadhaug	Alstadhaug Church	Alstadhaug	1180
Ekne	Ekne Church	Ekne	1893
Markabygd	Markabygda Church	Markabygda	1887

== Geography ==
Skogn Municipality was located to the south of the town of Levanger. It was bordered by Frosta Municipality and Åsen Municipality to the west, Hegra Municipality to the south, Verdal Municipality to the east, and Frol Municipality to the northeast. The highest point in the municipality was the 735.35-metre (2,412.6 ft) tall mountain Hårskallen, located on the border with Skogn Municipality.

== Government ==
While it existed, Skogn Municipality was responsible for primary education (through 10th grade), outpatient health services, senior citizen services, welfare and other social services, zoning, economic development, and municipal roads and utilities. The municipality was governed by a municipal council of directly elected representatives. The mayor was indirectly elected by a vote of the municipal council. The municipality was under the jurisdiction of the Frostating Court of Appeal.

=== Municipal council ===
The municipal council (Herredsstyre) of Skogn Municipality was made up of 25 representatives that were elected to four year terms. The tables below show the historical composition of the council by political party.

Skogn herredsstyre 1959–1961
Party name (in Norwegian)	Number of representatives
Labour Party (Arbeiderpartiet)	11
Christian Democratic Party (Kristelig Folkeparti)	3
Centre Party (Senterpartiet)	7
Liberal Party (Venstre)	3
Local List(s) (Lokale lister)	1
Total number of members:	25
Note: On 1 January 1962, Skogn Municipality became part of Levanger Municipality.

Skogn herredsstyre 1955–1959
Party name (in Norwegian)	Number of representatives
Labour Party (Arbeiderpartiet)	11
Communist Party (Kommunistiske Parti)	1
Christian Democratic Party (Kristelig Folkeparti)	3
Farmers' Party (Bondepartiet)	8
Liberal Party (Venstre)	2
Total number of members:	25

Skogn herredsstyre 1951–1955
Party name (in Norwegian)	Number of representatives
Labour Party (Arbeiderpartiet)	9
Joint List(s) of Non-Socialist Parties (Borgerlige Felleslister)	9
Local List(s) (Lokale lister)	2
Total number of members:	20

Skogn herredsstyre 1947–1951
Party name (in Norwegian)	Number of representatives
Labour Party (Arbeiderpartiet)	9
Joint List(s) of Non-Socialist Parties (Borgerlige Felleslister)	11
Total number of members:	20

Skogn herredsstyre 1945–1947
Party name (in Norwegian)	Number of representatives
Labour Party (Arbeiderpartiet)	9
Farmers' Party (Bondepartiet)	5
Joint List(s) of Non-Socialist Parties (Borgerlige Felleslister)	2
Local List(s) (Lokale lister)	4
Total number of members:	20

Skogn herredsstyre 1937–1941*
Party name (in Norwegian)	Number of representatives
Labour Party (Arbeiderpartiet)	9
Farmers' Party (Bondepartiet)	6
Liberal Party (Venstre)	1
List of workers, fishermen, and small farmholders (Arbeidere, fiskere, småbrukere liste)	1
Joint List(s) of Non-Socialist Parties (Borgerlige Felleslister)	2
Local List(s) (Lokale lister)	1
Total number of members:	20
Note: Due to the German occupation of Norway during World War II, no elections were held for new municipal councils until after the war ended in 1945.

=== Mayors ===
The mayor (Norwegian: ordfører) of Skogn Municipality was the political leader of the municipality and the chairperson of the municipal council. Here is a list of people who held this position:

- 1838–1838: Rasmus Hansen
- 1839–1839: Capt. Schnabel
- 1840–1843: Johannes Mathias Sejersted
- 1844–1848: Rasmus Hansen
- 1849–1849: Peder Isachsen Major
- 1850–1850: Peter Andreas Sæther
- 1851–1851: M. Lie
- 1852–1861: Peter Andreas Sæther
- 1862–1867: Olai Olsen
- 1868–1869: Reutz Holther
- 1870–1873: Peter Andreas Sæther
- 1874–1875: Olai Olsen
- 1876–1877: Per Hojem
- 1878–1879: H.P. Schaufel
- 1880–1889: Andreas Høe (V)
- 1890–1901: Gustav Jermstad (V)
- 1902–1910: Johan Arnt Næsgaard (V)
- 1911–1913: Lars Solstad (V)
- 1914–1915: Severin Hellem (V)
- 1915–1916: Johan Ludvik Bjørgum
- 1917–1919: Ove Storaunet (Ap)
- 1920–1925: Gunnar Nestgaard (Bp)
- 1926–1934: Ragnvald Stavrum (Bp)
- 1935–1941: Gunvald Nesgård (Bp)
- 1941–1945: Svend Gilstad (NS)
- 1945–1945: Gunvald Nesgård (Bp)
- 1946–1947: Olaf Løvli (Ap)
- 1948–1951: Einar Fostad (Bp)
- 1952–1955: Odin Vist (Ap)
- 1956–1959: Johan Holan (Sp)
- 1960–1960: Kristen Fostad (Sp)
- 1961–1961: Odin Vist (Ap)

== See also ==
- List of former municipalities of Norway
