= Åsen Municipality =

Former municipality in Trøndelag, Norway

Åsen Municipality Åsen herad
- Former municipality
- Aasen herad (historic name)
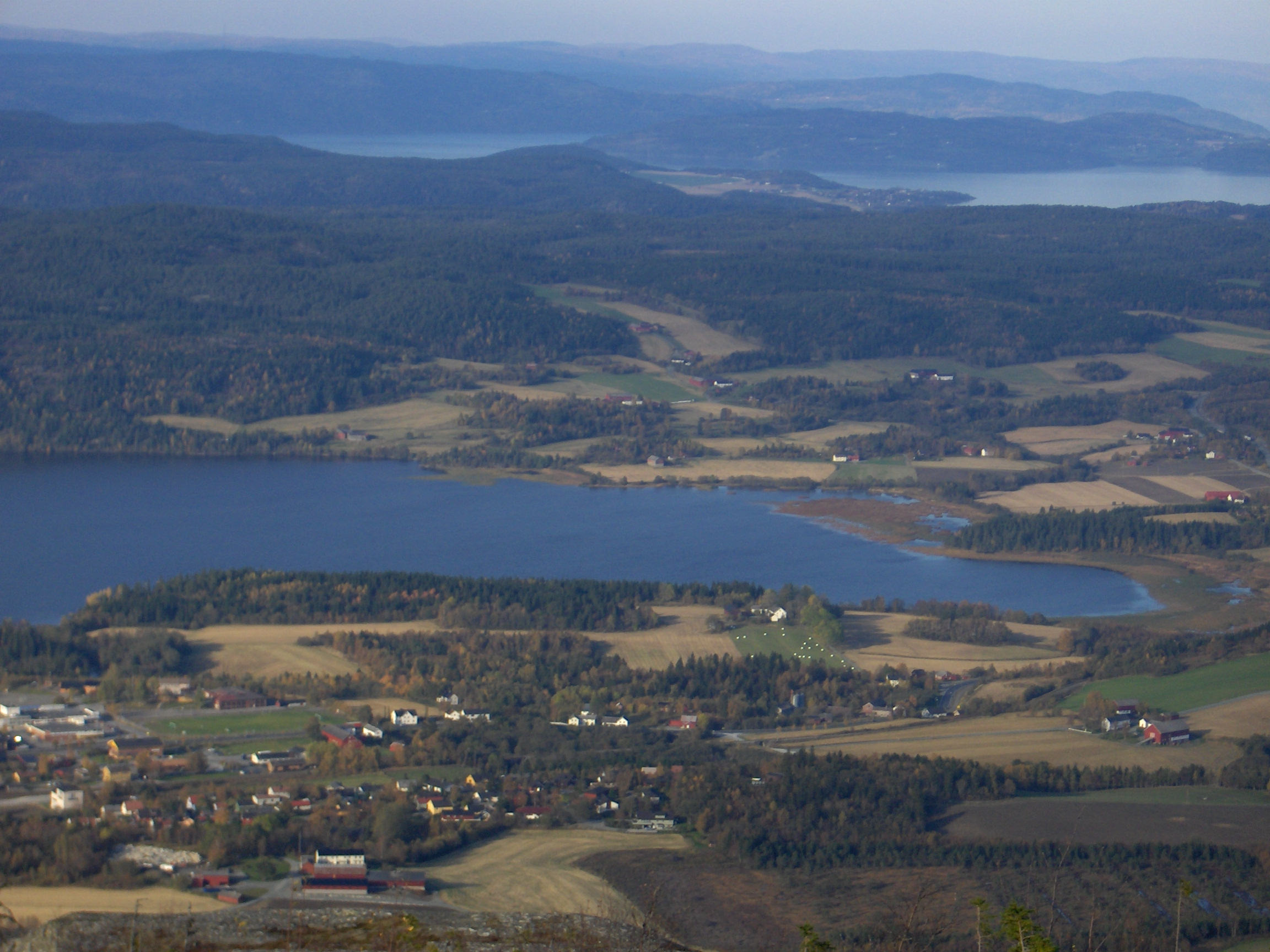
- The area surrounding the village of Åsen

- Nord-Trøndelag within Norway

- Åsen within Nord-Trøndelag
- Coordinates: 63°36′29″N 11°03′06″E
- Country: Norway
- County: Nord-Trøndelag
- District: Innherred
- Established: 1 Jan 1838
  - Created as: Formannskapsdistrikt
- Disestablished: 1 Jan 1962
  - Succeeded by: Levanger Municipality
- Administrative centre: Åsen

Government
  - Mayor (1960–1961): Fridtjov Mo (Sp)

Area (upon dissolution)
  - Total: 140.4 km^{2} (54.2 sq mi)
  - Rank: #455 in Norway
- Highest elevation: 516 m (1,693 ft)

Population (1961)
  - Total: 1,931
  - Rank: #468 in Norway
  - Density: 13.8/km^{2} (36/sq mi)
  - Change (10 years): ▼ −5.2%
- Demonym: Åsbygg

Official language
  - Norwegian form: Nynorsk
- Time zone: UTC+01:00 (CET)
  - Summer (DST): UTC+02:00 (CEST)
- ISO 3166 code: NO-1716

Åsen is a former municipality in the old Nord-Trøndelag county, Norway. The 140-square-kilometre (54 sq mi) municipality existed from 1838 until its dissolution in 1962. The municipality was located to the southwestern part of what is now Levanger Municipality in Trøndelag county, roughly bordered in the north by the lakes Hammervatnet and Hoklingen, and by the Åsenfjorden to the west. The administrative centre was the village of Åsen.

Prior to its dissolution in 1962, the 140.4-square-kilometre (54.2 sq mi) municipality was the 455th largest by area out of the 731 municipalities in Norway. Åsen Municipality was the 468th most populous municipality in Norway with a population of about 1,931. The municipality's population density was 13.8 inhabitants per square kilometre (36/sq mi) and its population had decreased by 5.2% over the previous 10-year period.

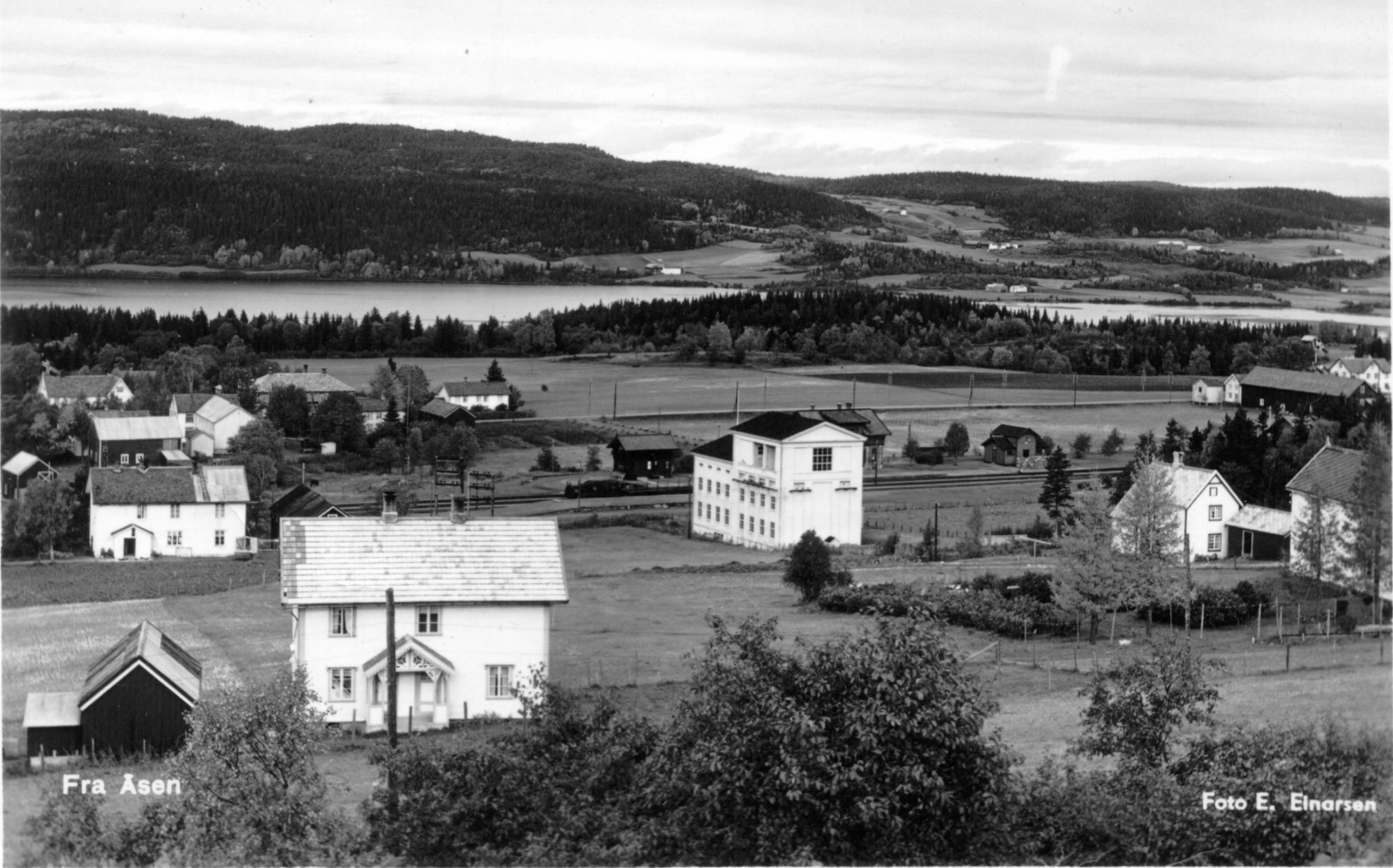
View of the Åsen area (c. 1930s)

== General information ==
The parish of Aasen was established as a municipality on 1 January 1838 (see formannskapsdistrikt law). The spelling was later changed to Åsen. During the 1960s, there were many municipal mergers across Norway due to the work of the Schei Committee. On 1 January 1962, the town of Levanger (population: 1,669) was merged with the neighboring Frol Municipality (population: 3,774), Åsen Municipality (population: 1,939), and Skogn Municipality (population: 4,756) to form a new, larger Levanger Municipality.

=== Name ===
The municipality (originally the parish) is named after the local fjord, Åsenfjorden (Old Norse: Ásfjǫrðr). The name is identical to the Norwegian word åsen which means "the hill". On 21 December 1917, a royal resolution enacted the 1917 Norwegian language reforms. Prior to this change, the name was spelled Aasen with the digraph "Aa", and after this reform, the name was spelled Åsen, using the letter Å instead.

=== Churches ===
The Church of Norway had one parish (sokn) within Åsen Municipality. At the time of the municipal dissolution, it was part of the Frosta prestegjeld and the Sør-Innherad prosti (deanery) in the Diocese of Nidaros.

Churches in Åsen Municipality
Parish (sokn)	Church name	Location of the church	Year built
Åsen	Åsen Church	Åsen	1904

== Geography ==
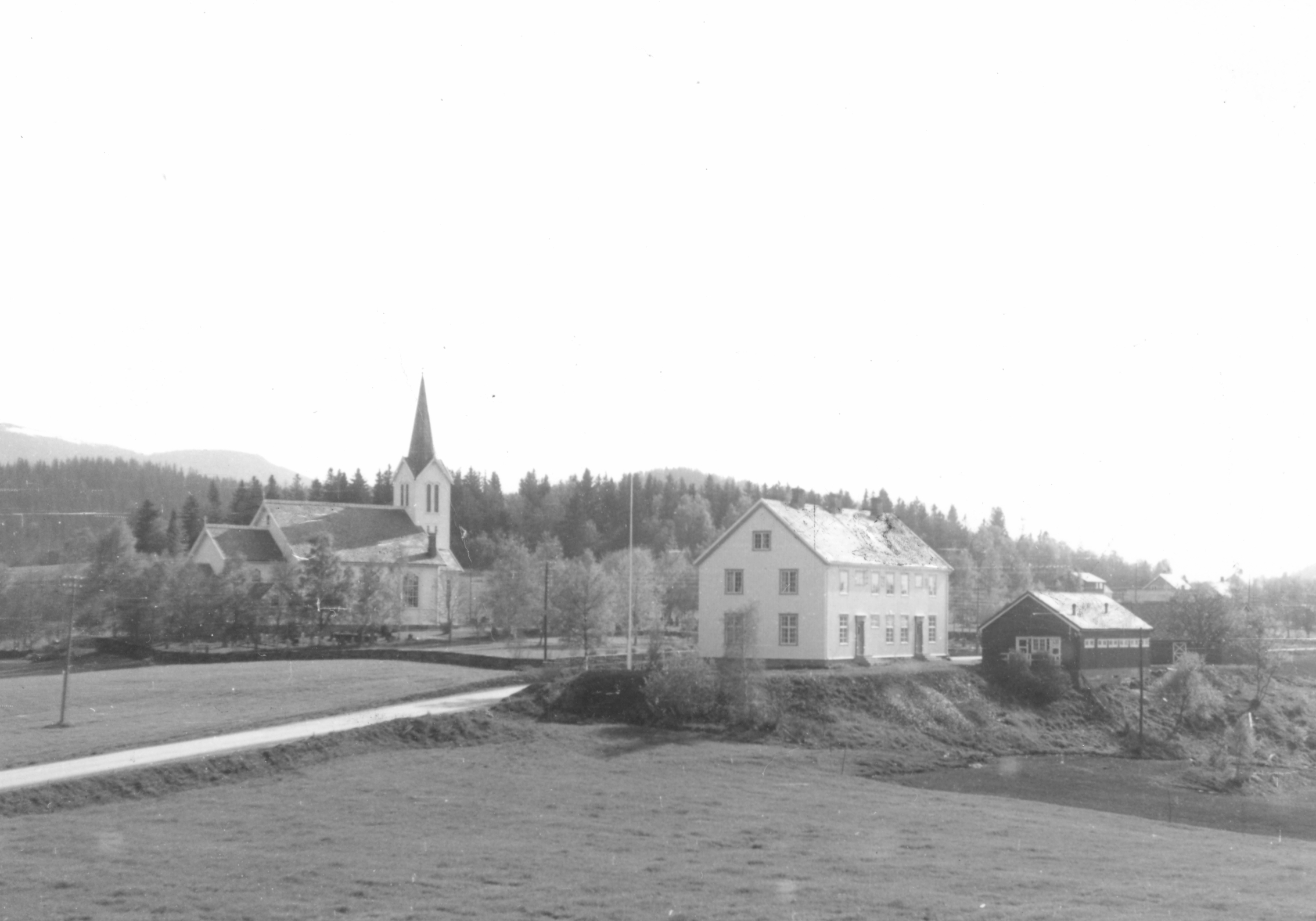
View of the local church and municipal government building (herredshus).

Åsen Municipality was located to the southwest of the town of Levanger. It was bordered by Frosta Municipality to the west, Skogn Municipality to the north and east, and by Hegra Municipality and Skatval Municipality to the south. The highest point in the municipality was the 516-metre (1,693 ft) tall mountain Stokkvola.

== Government ==
While it existed, Åsen Municipality was responsible for primary education (through 10th grade), outpatient health services, senior citizen services, welfare and other social services, zoning, economic development, and municipal roads and utilities. The municipality was governed by a municipal council of directly elected representatives. The mayor was indirectly elected by a vote of the municipal council. The municipality was under the jurisdiction of the Frostating Court of Appeal.

=== Municipal council ===
The municipal council (Herredsstyre) of Åsen Municipality was made up of 17 representatives that were elected to four year terms. The tables below show the historical composition of the council by political party.

Åsen heradsstyre 1959–1963
Party name (in Nynorsk)	Number of representatives
Labour Party (Arbeidarpartiet)	8
Christian Democratic Party (Kristeleg Folkeparti)	1
Centre Party (Senterpartiet)	5
Liberal Party (Venstre)	3
Total number of members:	17

Åsen heradsstyre 1955–1959
Party name (in Nynorsk)	Number of representatives
Labour Party (Arbeidarpartiet)	8
Christian Democratic Party (Kristeleg Folkeparti)	1
Farmers' Party (Bondepartiet)	5
Liberal Party (Venstre)	3
Total number of members:	17

Åsen heradsstyre 1951–1955
Party name (in Nynorsk)	Number of representatives
Labour Party (Arbeidarpartiet)	7
Christian Democratic Party (Kristeleg Folkeparti)	1
Farmers' Party (Bondepartiet)	5
Liberal Party (Venstre)	3
Total number of members:	16

Åsen heradsstyre 1947–1951
Party name (in Nynorsk)	Number of representatives
Labour Party (Arbeidarpartiet)	7
Christian Democratic Party (Kristeleg Folkeparti)	1
Farmers' Party (Bondepartiet)	5
Liberal Party (Venstre)	3
Total number of members:	16

Åsen heradsstyre 1945–1947
Party name (in Nynorsk)	Number of representatives
Labour Party (Arbeidarpartiet)	8
Christian Democratic Party (Kristeleg Folkeparti)	2
Farmers' Party (Bondepartiet)	3
Liberal Party (Venstre)	3
Total number of members:	16

Åsen heradsstyre 1937–1941*
Party name (in Nynorsk)	Number of representatives
Labour Party (Arbeidarpartiet)	5
Farmers' Party (Bondepartiet)	5
Liberal Party (Venstre)	6
Total number of members:	16
Note: Due to the German occupation of Norway during World War II, no elections were held for new municipal councils until after the war ended in 1945.

=== Mayors ===
The mayor (Nynorsk: ordførar) of Åsen Municipality was the political leader of the municipality and the chairperson of the municipal council. Here is a list of people who held this position:

- 1838–1839: Jonas Jonsen Nes
- 1839–1839: Erik Mikalsen Skjelstad
- 1840–1843: Peder Ellevsen Berg
- 1844–1845: Ole Tørrissen Vedul
- 1846–1847: Peder Steffensen Nonstad
- 1848–1859: Peder Olsen
- 1860–1866: Christian Bye
- 1867–1869: Ole Island
- 1870–1873: Henrik Reinaas
- 1874–1879: John Stavnaas
- 1880–1889: Peder O. Mæhre (V)
- 1890–1891: Arn Solem Bye (V)
- 1892–1919: Ole Martin Augdahl (V)
- 1920–1922: Anders Todal (V)
- 1923–1925: John Wold (Bp)
- 1926–1931: Anders Todal (V)
- 1932–1937: John Wold (Bp)
- 1938–1941: Sigurd Aarnseth (V)
- 1942–1943: Sigurd Lundby (NS)
- 1944–1944: Ragnar Fiskvik (NS)
- 1945–1945: Sigurd Aarnseth (V)
- 1946–1947: Olaf Jensen (Ap)
- 1948–1951: Fridtjov Mo (Bp)
- 1952–1955: Olav Mo (Bp)
- 1956–1957: Olaf Jensen (Ap)
- 1958–1959: Ivar Jørum (Ap)
- 1960–1961: Fridtjov Mo (Sp)

== See also ==
- List of former municipalities of Norway
