= Byavatnet =

Lake in Trøndelag, Norway

- Byvatnet
- Interactive map of the lake
- Location: Levanger Municipality, Trøndelag
- Coordinates: 63.6639°N 11.0202°E
- Basin countries: Norway
- Max. length: 5 kilometres (3.1 mi)
- Max. width: 800 metres (2,600 ft)
- Surface area: 2.31 km^{2} (0.89 sq mi)
- Shore length^{1}: 14 kilometres (8.7 mi)
- Surface elevation: 41 metres (135 ft)
- References: NVE
- ^{1} Shore length is not a well-defined measure.

Byavatnet is a lake in Levanger Municipality in Trøndelag county, Norway. It is located about 2.5 kilometres (1.6 mi) south of the village of Ekne and about 3 kilometres (1.9 mi) west of the village of Ronglan. The lake Hammervatnet lies about 3.5 kilometres (2.2 mi) south of Byavatnet and the lake Sønningen lies about 1.5 kilometres (0.93 mi) to the northwest. The 2.31-square-kilometre (570-acre) lake is about 5 kilometres (3.1 mi) long and about 800 metres (0.5 mi) wide.

== See also ==
- List of lakes in Norway
