= Frol Municipality =

Former municipality in Trøndelag, Norway

Frol Municipality Frol herad
- Former municipality
- Levanger landsogn (historic name); Levanger herred (historic name)
- Nord-Trøndelag within Norway

- Frol within Nord-Trøndelag
- Coordinates: 63°41′08″N 11°29′15″E
- Country: Norway
- County: Nord-Trøndelag
- District: Innherred
- Established: 1856
  - Preceded by: Levanger Municipality
- Disestablished: 1 Jan 1962
  - Succeeded by: Levanger Municipality
- Administrative centre: Brusve

Government
  - Mayor (1960–1961): Tormod Johansen (Ap)

Area (upon dissolution)
  - Total: 140.5 km^{2} (54.2 sq mi)
  - Rank: #454 in Norway
- Highest elevation: 735.35 m (2,412.6 ft)

Population (1961)
  - Total: 3,801
  - Rank: #234 in Norway
  - Density: 27.1/km^{2} (70/sq mi)
  - Change (10 years): ▲ +11.9%
- Demonym: Froling

Official language
  - Norwegian form: Nynorsk
- Time zone: UTC+01:00 (CET)
  - Summer (DST): UTC+02:00 (CEST)
- ISO 3166 code: NO-1720

Frol is a former municipality in the old Nord-Trøndelag county, Norway. The 140-square-kilometre (54 sq mi) municipality existed from 1856 until its dissolution in 1962. The municipality was first known as Levanger landsogn and then in 1911 the name was changed to Frol Municipality. The municipality included all the area surrounding the town of Levanger in what is now Levanger Municipality in Trøndelag county. The administrative centre of the municipality was located at Brusve, just outside the town of Levanger.

Prior to its dissolution in 1962, the 140.5-square-kilometre (54.2 sq mi) municipality was the 454th largest by area out of the 731 municipalities in Norway. Frol Municipality was the 234th most populous municipality in Norway with a population of about 3,801. The municipality's population density was 27.1 inhabitants per square kilometre (70/sq mi) and its population had increased by 11.9% over the previous 10-year period.

== History ==
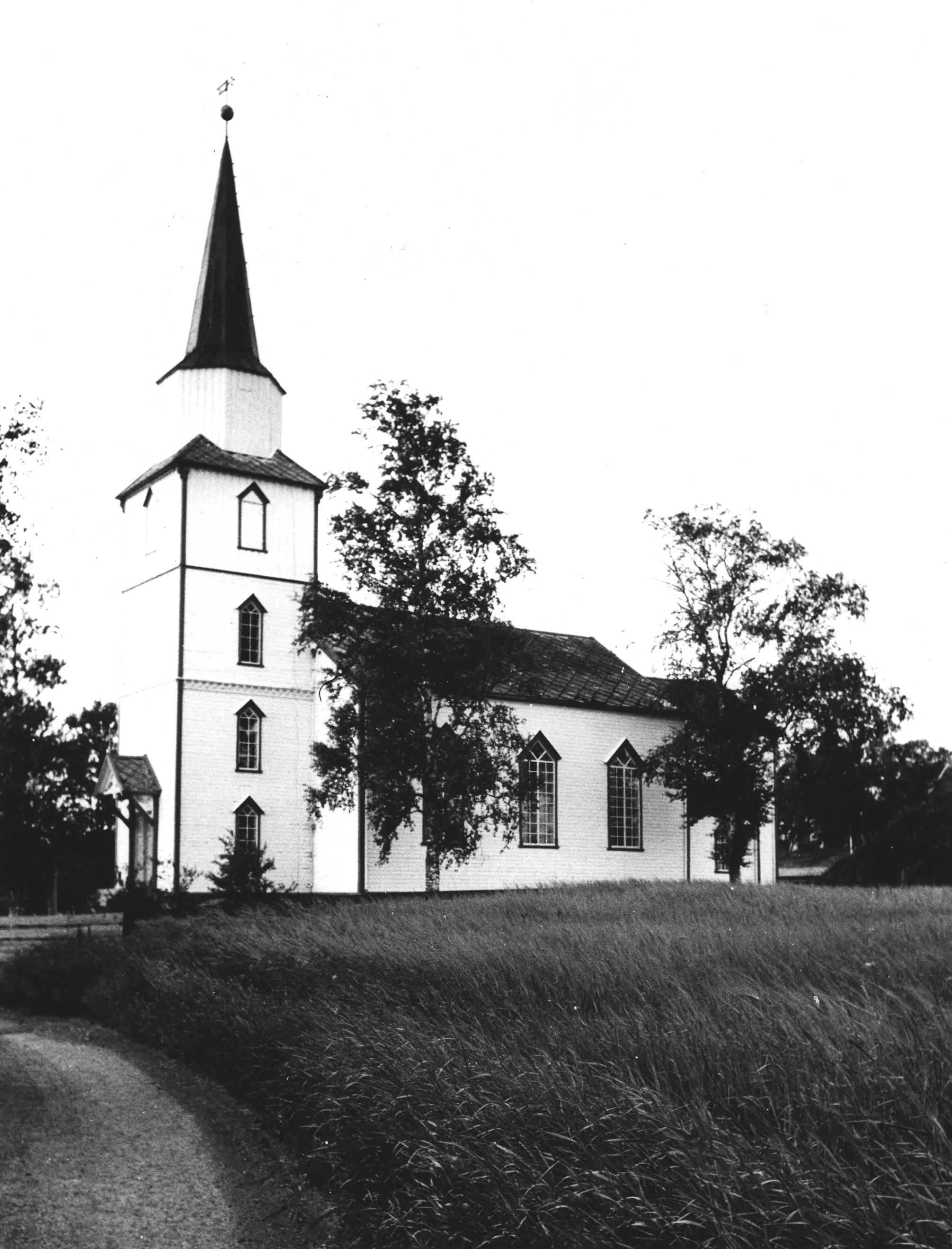
Okkenhaug Church in Frol

The municipality was established as Levanger landsogn in 1856 when Levanger Municipality was divided into two municipalities: the "town" (kjøpstad) of Levanger and the "rural district" (landsogn or herred) of Levanger (see formannskapsdistrikt law). The two municipalities were named Levanger kjøpstad (population: 1,017) and Levanger landsogn (population: 2,290). On 28 November 1874, two uninhabited parts of the neighboring Skogn Municipality were transferred to Levanger landsogn by a royal resolution. In 1917, the name was changed to Frol Municipality. On 13 November 1951, the Lillemarksbakkene area in Frol Municipality (population: 51) was transferred to the town of Levanger.

During the 1960s, there were many municipal mergers across Norway due to the work of the Schei Committee. On 1 January 1962, the town of Levanger (population: 1,669) was merged with the neighboring Frol Municipality (population: 3,774), Åsen Municipality (population: 1,939), and Skogn Municipality (population: 4,756) to form a new, larger Levanger Municipality.

=== Name ===
The original name of the municipality was Levanger landsogn, after the old Levanger farm (Old Norse: Lifangr) since the first Levanger Church was built there. The first element is Lif which means "sheltered". The last element is angr which means "fjord". The second word landsogn simply meant "rural area" (to distinguish it from the neighboring town of Levanger).

On 3 November 1917, a royal resolution changed the name of the municipality to Frol. This was done to distinguish it from the neighboring town of Levanger. The new name came from the old Frol skipreide (Old Norse: Fról) which was a medieval administrative division of Norway. The meaning of the old name is uncertain.

=== Churches ===
The Church of Norway had one parish (sokn) within Frol Municipality. At the time of the municipal dissolution, it was part of the Levanger prestegjeld and the Sør-Innherad prosti (deanery) in the Diocese of Nidaros.

Churches in Frol Municipality
Parish (sokn)	Church name	Location of the church	Year built
Frol	Okkenhaug Church	Okkenhaug	1893

== Geography ==
Frol Municipality was located to the east of the town of Levanger. It was bordered by Verdal Municipality to the northeast and Skogn Municipality to the south and west. The highest point in the municipality was the 735.35-metre (2,412.6 ft) tall mountain Hårskallen, located on the border with Skogn Municipality.

== Government ==
While it existed, Frol Municipality was responsible for primary education (through 10th grade), outpatient health services, senior citizen services, welfare and other social services, zoning, economic development, and municipal roads and utilities. The municipality was governed by a municipal council of directly elected representatives. The mayor was indirectly elected by a vote of the municipal council. The municipality was under the jurisdiction of the Frostating Court of Appeal.

=== Municipal council ===
The municipal council (Herredsstyre) of Frol Municipality was made up of 21 representatives that were elected to four year terms. The tables below show the historical composition of the council by political party.

Frol heradsstyre 1959–1963
Party name (in Nynorsk)	Number of representatives
Labour Party (Arbeidarpartiet)	11
Conservative Party (Høgre)	1
Christian Democratic Party (Kristeleg Folkeparti)	2
Centre Party (Senterpartiet)	5
Liberal Party (Venstre)	2
Total number of members:	21

Frol heradsstyre 1955–1959
Party name (in Nynorsk)	Number of representatives
Labour Party (Arbeidarpartiet)	11
Conservative Party (Høgre)	1
Christian Democratic Party (Kristeleg Folkeparti)	2
Farmers' Party (Bondepartiet)	5
Liberal Party (Venstre)	2
Total number of members:	21

Frol heradsstyre 1951–1955
Party name (in Nynorsk)	Number of representatives
Labour Party (Arbeidarpartiet)	10
Christian Democratic Party (Kristeleg Folkeparti)	2
Farmers' Party (Bondepartiet)	5
Liberal Party (Venstre)	3
Total number of members:	20

Frol heradsstyre 1947–1951
Party name (in Nynorsk)	Number of representatives
Labour Party (Arbeidarpartiet)	10
Farmers' Party (Bondepartiet)	5
Liberal Party (Venstre)	3
Local List(s) (Lokale lister)	2
Total number of members:	20

Frol heradsstyre 1945–1947
Party name (in Nynorsk)	Number of representatives
Labour Party (Arbeidarpartiet)	9
Liberal Party (Venstre)	5
Local List(s) (Lokale lister)	6
Total number of members:	20

Frol heradsstyre 1937–1941*
Party name (in Nynorsk)	Number of representatives
Labour Party (Arbeidarpartiet)	9
Farmers' Party (Bondepartiet)	6
Liberal Party (Venstre)	5
Total number of members:	20
Note: Due to the German occupation of Norway during World War II, no elections were held for new municipal councils until after the war ended in 1945.

=== Mayors ===
The mayor (Nynorsk: ordførar) of Frol Municipality was the political leader of the municipality and the chairperson of the municipal council. Here is a list of people who held this position:

- 1856–1859: Hans Severin Jelstrup
- 1860–1865: Nils Støre
- 1866–1867: Thomas Christian Jelstrup
- 1868–1869: Carl Fredrik Okkenhaug
- 1870–1871: Martinus Aagaard
- 1872–1877: Thomas Christian Jelstrup
- 1878–1879: Carl Fredrik Okkenhaug
- 1880–1881: Thomas Christian Jelstrup
- 1882–1883: Eliseus Heir (V)
- 1884–1885: Johannes Floan (V)
- 1886–1889: Peter Holst (V)
- 1890–1895: Johannes Okkenhaug (V)
- 1896–1899: Johannes Floan (V)
- 1900–1901: Paul Okkenhaug (V)
- 1902–1904: Johannes Munkeby (V)
- 1905–1910: Godtvard Berg (V)
- 1911–1913: Gustav Ertzgaard (H)
- 1914–1922: Martin Stavrum (V)
- 1923–1928: Petter Andreas Røstad (Bp)
- 1929–1937: Karl Okkenhaug (V)
- 1938–1940: Oddleiv Spillum (Bp)
- 1941–1945: Karl Haug (NS)
- 1945–1947: Oddleiv Spillum (Bp)
- 1948–1959: Kristian Halsan (Ap)
- 1960–1961: Tormod Johansen (Ap)

== See also ==
- List of former municipalities of Norway
