= Geir Overskeid =

Norwegian psychologist

- Born: July 19, 1963 (age 63); Levanger, Norway
- Known for: Work on learning, motivation, and the interplay between thoughts and emotions
- Scientific career
- Fields: Cognitive psychology
- Institutions: University of Oslo

Geir Overskeid (born 19 July 1963) is a Norwegian psychologist. He was born on July 19, 1963, in Levanger but was raised in Fredrikstad, and this is what he considers to be his hometown. He gained his Doctorate in psychology in 1995, and is currently professor of Cognitive psychology at the University of Oslo. Overskeid has, among other things, worked with questions connected to learning and motivation and the interplay between thoughts and feelings. He has co-edited the book Det ubeviste og moderne vitenskap (In English: The unconscious and modern science) and written the book Sprø som selleri: Hvor gærne psykologene egentlig er (og psykiaterne er enda verre), a funny take on international and Norwegian psychology.

== Works ==
- Overskeid, Geir (1995). Behavior Analysis and Psychology: Models, Causes, and Consciousness. University of Oslo.

=== Papers ===
- Overskeid, Geir (2010). "Empirically Understanding Understanding Can Make Problems Go Away: The Case of the Chinese Room". The Psychological Record. 55 (4).
- Overskeid, Geir (2007). "Looking for Skinner and finding Freud". American Psychologist. 62 (6): 590–5. CiteSeerX 10.1.1.321.6288. doi:10.1037/0003-066X.62.6.590. PMID 17874899.
- Overskeid, Geir (2006). "Why behave? The problem of initiating causes and the goals of prediction and control". The Psychological Record. 56 (3): 323–340. doi:10.1007/BF03395553. S2CID 143000260.
- Overskeid, Geir (2002). "Psychological hedonism and the nature of motivation: Bertrand Russell's anhedonic desires". Philosophical Psychology. 15 (1): 77–93. doi:10.1080/09515080120109432. S2CID 143828993.
- Overskeid, Geir (2000). "The slave of the passions: Experiencing problems and selecting solutions". Review of General Psychology. 4 (3): 284–309. doi:10.1037/1089-2680.4.3.284. S2CID 143464408.
- Overskeid, Geir (2000). "Why Do We Think? Consequences of Regarding Thinking as Behavior". The Journal of Psychology. 134 (4): 357–74. doi:10.1080/00223980009598222. PMID 10908070. S2CID 34810231.
- Overskeid, Geir (1999). "What is Special About "Implicit" and "Explicit"?". Behavioral and Brain Sciences. 22 (5): 780. doi:10.1017/S0140525X99502185. S2CID 144301580.
- Overskeid, Geir (1995). "Cognitivist or behaviourist - Who can tell the difference? The case of implicit and explicit knowledge". British Journal of Psychology. 86 (4): 517–522. doi:10.1111/j.2044-8295.1995.tb02568.x.
- Overskeid, Geir (1992). "Is any human behavior schedule-induced?". The Psychological Record. 42 (3): 323–340. doi:10.1007/BF03399605. S2CID 151825246.
- Overskeid, Geir (2010-08-18). "They Should Have Thought About the Consequences: The Crisis of Cognitivism and a Second Chance for Behavior Analysis". The Psychological Record. 58 (1).
- Overskeid, Geir (2010-10-20). "Solitary Pain: Bertrand Russell as Cognitive Therapist". The Psychological Record. 54 (1).
- Overskeid, Geir (1994). "Knowledge, Consciousness, Terminology, and Therapy". Scandinavian Journal of Behaviour Therapy. 23 (2): 65–72. doi:10.1080/16506079409455957.
- Overskeid, Geir (1994). "Private events and other causes of behavior: Who can tell the difference?". The Psychological Record.
