= Olai Olsen =

Norwegian politician and newspaper editor

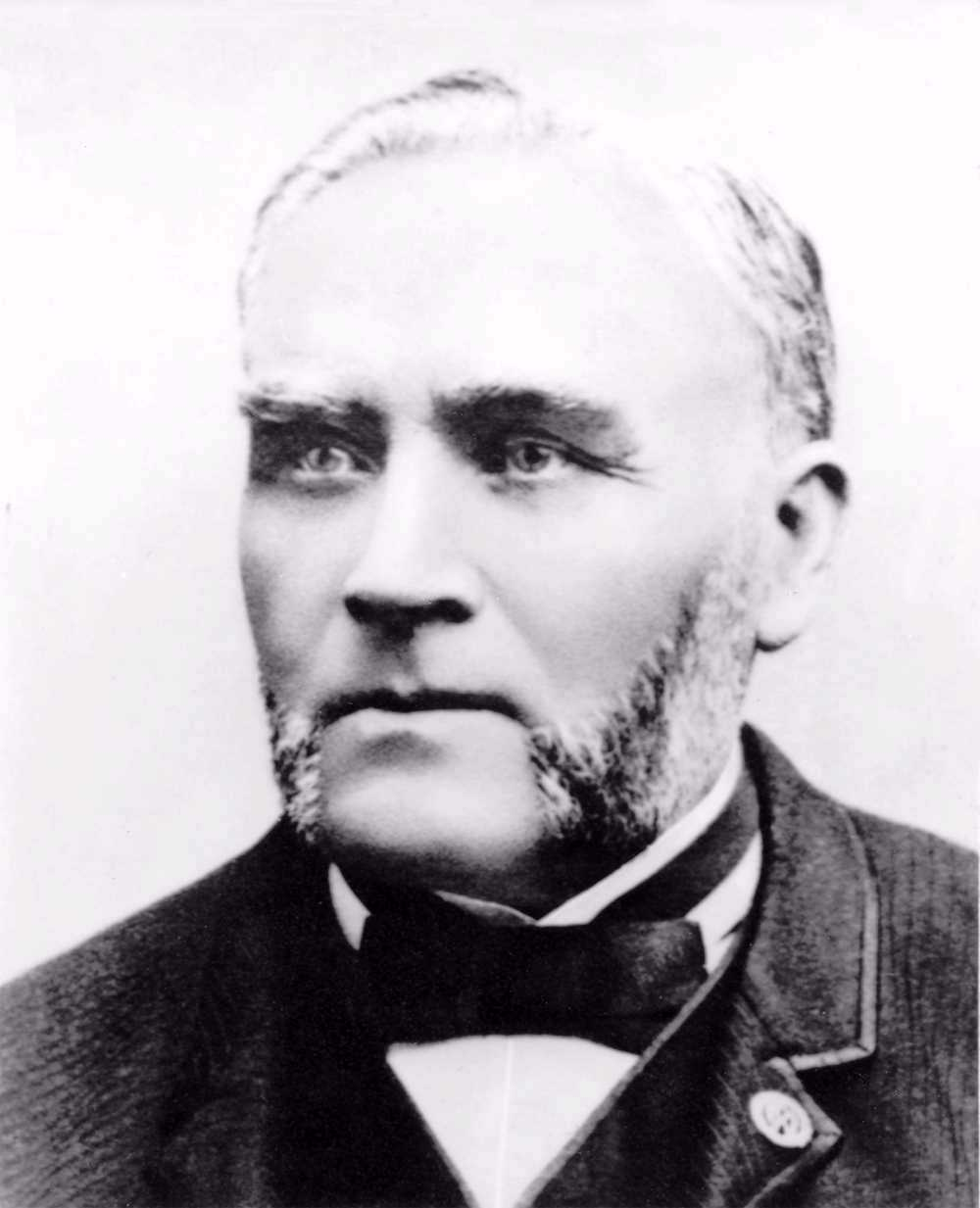
Olai Olsen

Olai Olsen (1830–1895) was a Norwegian politician and newspaper editor. He was mayor of Skogn Municipality for eight years (1862–67 and 1874–75) and served three terms as a deputy to Parliament. He founded and was the inaugural editor of Nordenfjeldsk Tidende in 1873. In 1877 he became the first editor of Dagsposten, which would become Trondheim's largest newspaper. He later also edited Trondhjems Stiftsavis, Tiden and Romsdalsposten.

== Early and personal life ==
Olai Olsen was born in Stjørdalen Municipality in 1830. He was a few years old when his family moved to Markabygda in Skogn Municipality. He graduated with a teaching degree from Klæbu Seminary in 1849, and worked for many years as a teacher in Skogn. He bought a farm there as well. His son Olaf Ray (born 1856) emigrated to Chicago and became a lawyer, politician and author. Olai Olsen visited the United States once.

== Politics ==
Olsen was mayor of Skogn Municipality in 1862 through 1867, and in 1874 and 1875. He was elected as a deputy representative to Parliament at three occasions.

== Editor ==
Olsen was the founder and first editor of Nordenfjeldsk Tidende, the second newspaper to be founded in Levanger. The background was discontent amongst the liberal-minded of the conservative alignment of the existing newspaper, Nordre Trondhjems Amtstidende. Olsen did not stay long with his new newspaper. He soon sold it and moved to Trondheim.

In Trondheim, Olsen first was editor-in-chief for Trondhjems Stiftsavis, before becoming the first editor of Dagsposten. It would grow to become Trondheim's most read newspaper. Olsen moved on in 1883, to edit Tiden. He then edited Kristiansund-based Romsdalsposten from 1888 to 1890.

== Death and memorial ==
Olsen died in Skogn in 1895, and was buried at Alstadhaug Cemetery. In 1936, the local chapter of the Agrarian Association established a committee to honor Olsen. This resulted in a memorial stone honoring him being erected at the cemetery in 1938.
