= Anders Todal =

Norwegian politician

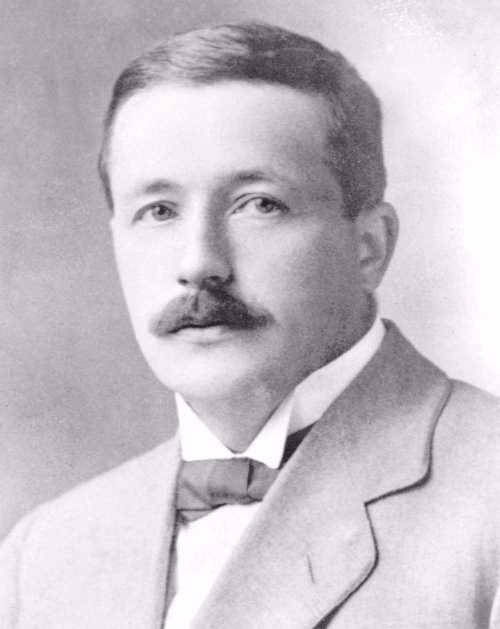
Anders Todal

Anders Todal (18 March 1883 – 6 March 1956) was a Norwegian teacher, politician and school administrator in Trøndelag.

He was born in Valsøyfjord and graduated from Levanger teacher's college 1904. Working as a teacher in Åsen 1905–1933, he also served as mayor of Åsen Municipality from 1919 to 1922, and from 1925 to 1931. He was elected to the Storting from 1931 to 1933, representing the Liberal Party in Nord-Trøndelag. He chaired the organization Noregs Mållag from 1932 to 1936. He served as school director in Nidaros 1933–1953. In 1942 he was imprisoned and incarcerated in Vollan prison and the Falstad concentration camp.

His cousin Anders A. Todal (1884-1963) was head of the Regional State Archives in Trondheim 1934-1954.

Cultural offices
Preceded by Gustav Indrebø	Chairman of Noregs Mållag; 1932–1936	Succeeded by Knut Markhus
