= Sønningen =

Lake in Trøndelag, Norway

- Interactive map of the lake
- Location: Levanger Municipality, Trøndelag
- Coordinates: 63.6735°N 10.9704°E
- Basin countries: Norway
- Max. length: 3 kilometres (1.9 mi)
- Max. width: 800 metres (2,600 ft)
- Surface area: 0.86 km^{2} (210 acres)
- Shore length^{1}: 8.31 kilometres (5.16 mi)
- Surface elevation: 140 metres (460 ft)
- References: NVE
- ^{1} Shore length is not a well-defined measure.

Sønningen is a lake in Levanger Municipality in Trøndelag county, Norway. The 0.86 km^{2} (210-acre) lake lies about 2.5 km (1.6 mi) southwest of the village of Ekne, about 2 km (1.2 mi) west of the lake Byavatnet, and about 2.3 kilometres (1.4 mi) southeast of the shore of the Trondheimsfjorden.

== Geography ==
Sønningen is a lake located in Levanger Municipality, Trøndelag County, in northern Norway, at an elevation of approximately 140 meters above sea level. The lake lies about 2.5 kilometers southwest of the village of Ekne, roughly 2 kilometers west of Byavatnet Lake, and 2.3 kilometers southeast of the Trondheimsfjorden coast. It is accessible via surrounding natural trails and is bordered by forests and typical hills of the Trøndelag region, making it part of the local ecosystem and a site for outdoor recreational activities.

== See also ==
- List of lakes in Norway
