= Movatnet =

Lake in Levanger, Norway

- Interactive map of the lake
- Location: Levanger Municipality, Trøndelag
- Coordinates: 63.6251°N 11.1884°E
- Primary inflows: Grønningselva river
- Primary outflows: Hoklingen
- Basin countries: Norway
- Max. length: 3.5 kilometres (2.2 mi)
- Max. width: 4 kilometres (2.5 mi)
- Surface area: 6.83 km^{2} (2.64 sq mi)
- Shore length^{1}: 20.7 kilometres (12.9 mi)
- Surface elevation: 88 metres (289 ft)
- References: NVE
- ^{1} Shore length is not a well-defined measure.

Movatnet is a lake in Levanger Municipality in Trøndelag county, Norway. The 6.83-square-kilometre (2.64 sq mi) lake lies immediately to the east of the lake Hoklingen and just to the west of the village of Markabygd.

== See also ==
- List of lakes in Norway
