= Ekne =

Village in Levanger Municipality, Norway

- Village
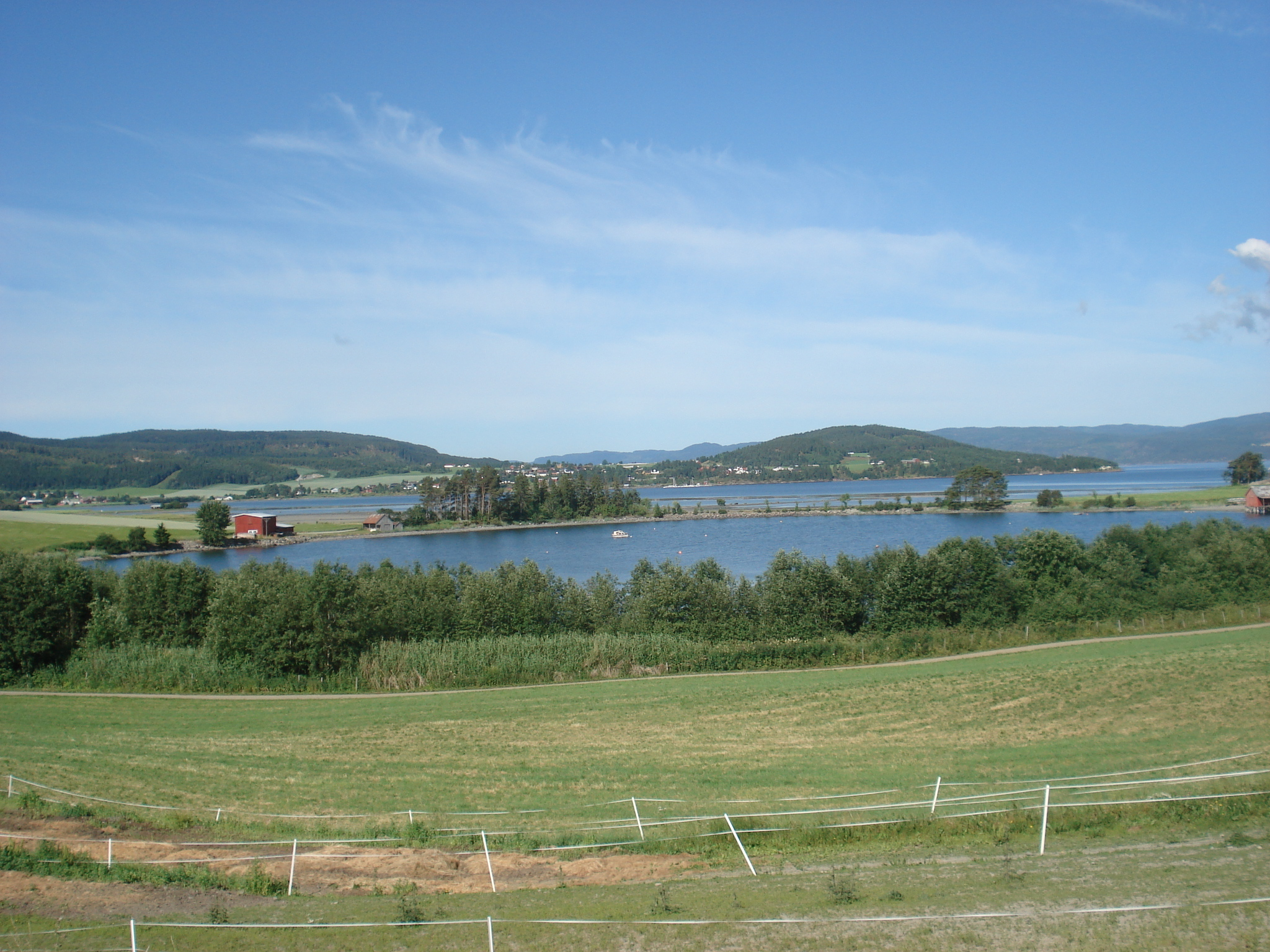
- View of the village
- Interactive map of Ekne
- Location within Trøndelag Location within Norway
- Coordinates: 63.7007°N 11.0384°E
- Country: Norway
- Region: Central Norway
- County: Trøndelag
- District: Innherred
- Municipality: Levanger Municipality

Area
  - Total: 0.23 km^{2} (0.089 sq mi)
- Elevation: 19 m (62 ft)

Population (2024)
  - Total: 324
  - Density: 1,409/km^{2} (3,650/sq mi)
- Time zone: UTC+01:00 (CET)
  - Summer (DST): UTC+02:00 (CEST)
- Post Code: 7624 Ekne

Ekne is a village in Levanger Municipality in Trøndelag county, Norway. It is located 8 kilometres (5.0 mi) west of the village of Skogn and about 15 kilometres (9.3 mi) southwest of the town of Levanger. The lakes Sønningen and Byavatnet lie south of the village. Ekne Church is located in this village. The World War II-era Falstad concentration camp was also located here.

The 0.23-square-kilometre (57-acre) village has a population (2024) of 324 and a population density of 1,409 inhabitants per square kilometre (3,650/sq mi).
