= Gustav Indrebø =

Norwegian philologist

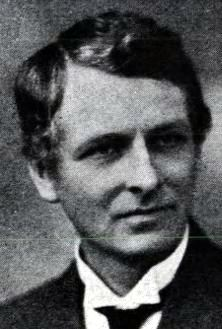
Norwegian philologist and professor of linguistics Gustav Indrebø (1889–1942)

Gustav Indrebø (17 December 1889 in Samnanger, Søndre Bergenhus – 3 August 1942) was a Norwegian philologist.

His father was a teacher in Aardal in the old Jølster Municipality (now part of Sunnfjord Municipality). His brother Ragnvald Indrebø became bishop of the diocese of Bjørgvin.

He graduated in 1917, took a doctorate (dr.philol.) in 1925, and became professor in linguistics in 1930. He published over 200 scholarly papers. Linguistically he was an advocate of the Aasen line of Nynorsk, and he was the chairman of Noregs Mållag from 1930 to 1932.

Interested in toponymy, Indrebø established Norsk Stadnamnarkiv in 1921 together with fellow professors Magnus Olsen and Edvard Bull, Sr.

On April 1, 1942, Indrebø resigned from the Fana branch of Noregs Mållag because he did not want the Nasjonal Samling party running the organization.

Cultural offices
Preceded by Torleiv Hannaas	Chairman of Noregs Mållag; 1930–1932	Succeeded by Anders Todal
