= Markabygda Church =

Church in Trøndelag, Norway

- Markabygda kirke
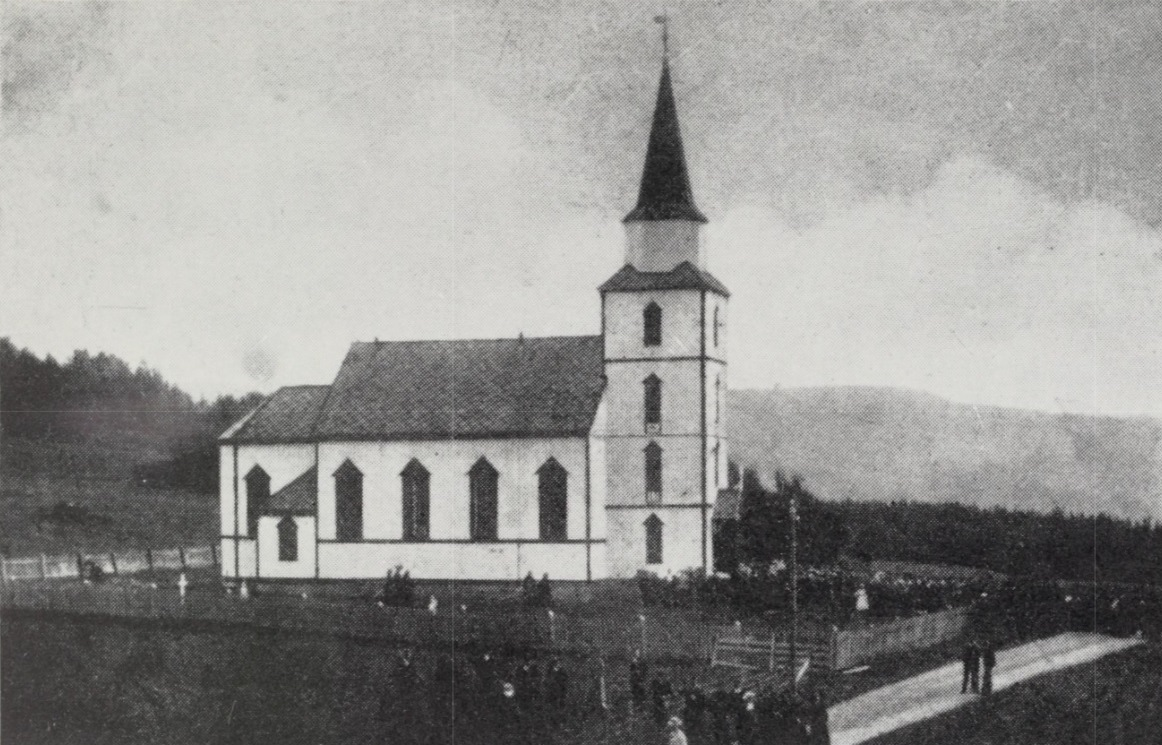
- View of the church
- Markabygda Church
- 63.63666796°N 11.274547577°E
- Location: Levanger Municipality, Trøndelag
- Country: Norway
- Denomination: Church of Norway
- Churchmanship: Evangelical Lutheran

History
- Status: Parish church
- Founded: 1887
- Consecrated: 1887

Architecture
- Functional status: Active
- Architect: Ole Andresen
- Architectural type: Long church
- Completed: 1887 (139 years ago)

Specifications
- Capacity: 170
- Materials: Wood

Administration
- Diocese: Nidaros bispedømme
- Deanery: Stiklestad prosti
- Parish: Markabygd
- Norwegian Cultural Heritage Site
- Type: Church
- Status: Not protected
- ID: 84398

Markabygda Church (Norwegian: Markabygda kirke) is a parish church of the Church of Norway in Levanger Municipality in Trøndelag county, Norway. It is located in the village of Markabygda. It is the church for the Markabygd parish which is part of the Stiklestad prosti (deanery) in the Diocese of Nidaros. The white, wooden church was built in a long church style in 1887 using plans drawn up by the architect Ole Andresen. The church seats about 170 people.

== See also ==
- List of churches in Nidaros
