= Hoklingen =

Lake in Trøndelag, Norway

- Interactive map of the lake
- Location: Levanger Municipality, Trøndelag
- Coordinates: 63.6198°N 11.1313°E
- Primary inflows: Movatnet
- Primary outflows: Fossingelva river
- Basin countries: Norway
- Max. length: 4.7 kilometres (2.9 mi)
- Max. width: 2.2 kilometres (1.4 mi)
- Surface area: 6.1 km^{2} (2.4 sq mi)
- Shore length^{1}: 12.74 kilometres (7.92 mi)
- Surface elevation: 88 metres (289 ft)
- References: NVE
- ^{1} Shore length is not a well-defined measure.

Hoklingen is a lake in Levanger Municipality in Trøndelag county, Norway. The 6.1-square-kilometre (2.4 sq mi) lake lies just to the east of the village of Åsen and about 6 kilometres (3.7 mi) south of the village of Skogn.

The lake Movatnet is the main inflow of water into Hoklingen. There is a small dam that regulates the outflow of water at the southwest end of the lake. The water flows out into the river Fossingelva which then flows into the nearby lake Hammervatnet.

== See also ==
- List of lakes in Norway
