= Ekne Church =

Church in Trøndelag, Norway

- Ekne kirke
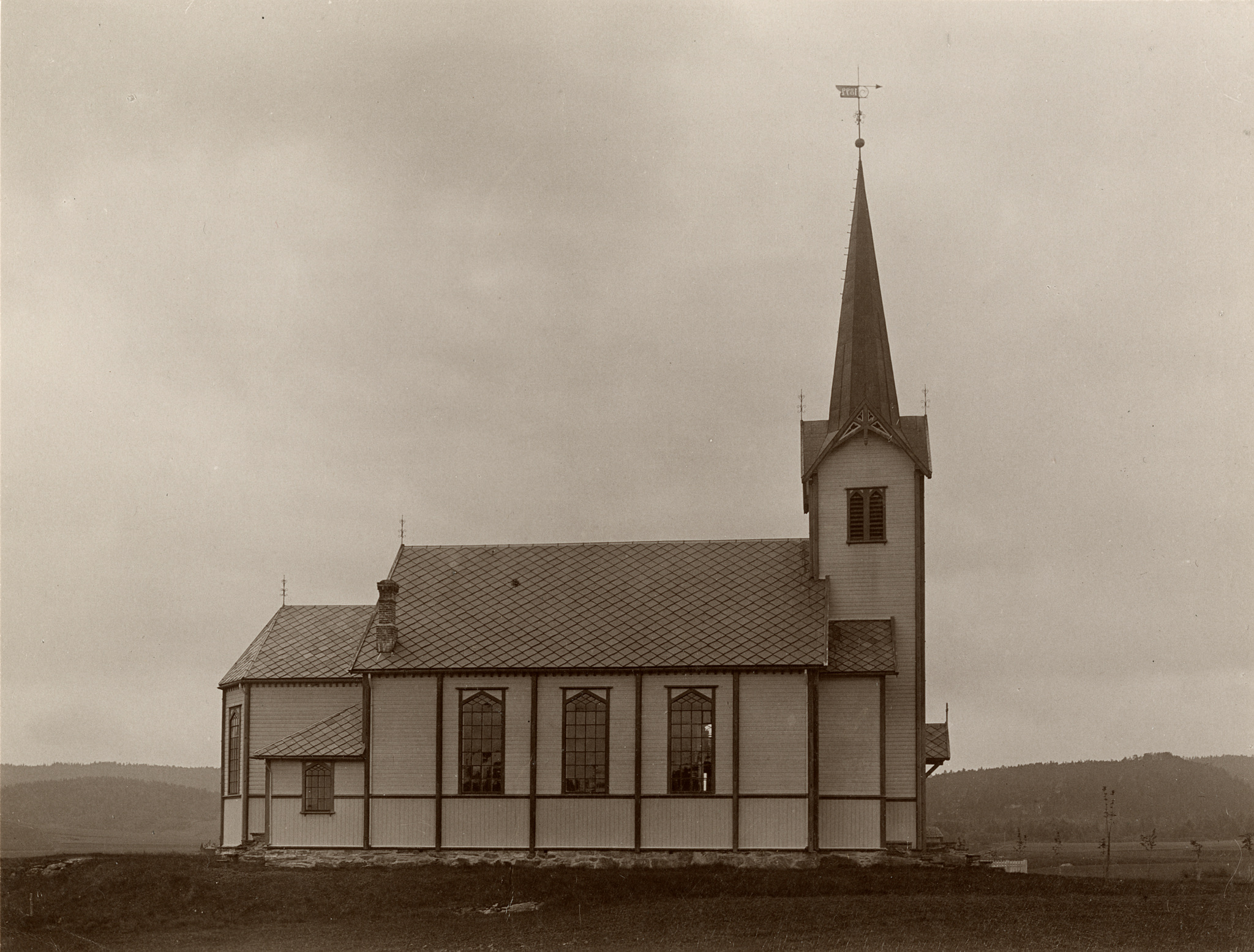
- View of the church
- Ekne Church
- 63.69865358°N 11.040944606°E
- Location: Levanger Municipality, Trøndelag
- Country: Norway
- Denomination: Church of Norway
- Churchmanship: Evangelical Lutheran

History
- Status: Parish church
- Founded: c. 14th century
- Consecrated: 27 June 1893

Architecture
- Functional status: Active
- Architect: O.M. Günther
- Architectural type: Long church
- Completed: 1893 (133 years ago)

Specifications
- Capacity: 220
- Materials: Wood

Administration
- Diocese: Nidaros bispedømme
- Deanery: Stiklestad prosti
- Parish: Ekne
- Norwegian Cultural Heritage Site
- Type: Church
- Status: Not protected
- ID: 84082

Ekne Church (Norwegian: Ekne kirke) is a parish church of the Church of Norway in Levanger Municipality in Trøndelag county, Norway. It is located in the village of Ekne. It is the church for the Ekne parish which is part of the Stiklestad prosti (deanery) in the Diocese of Nidaros. The white, wooden church was built in a long church style in 1893 using plans drawn up by the architect O.M. Günther from Hommelvik. The church seats about 220 people.

== History ==
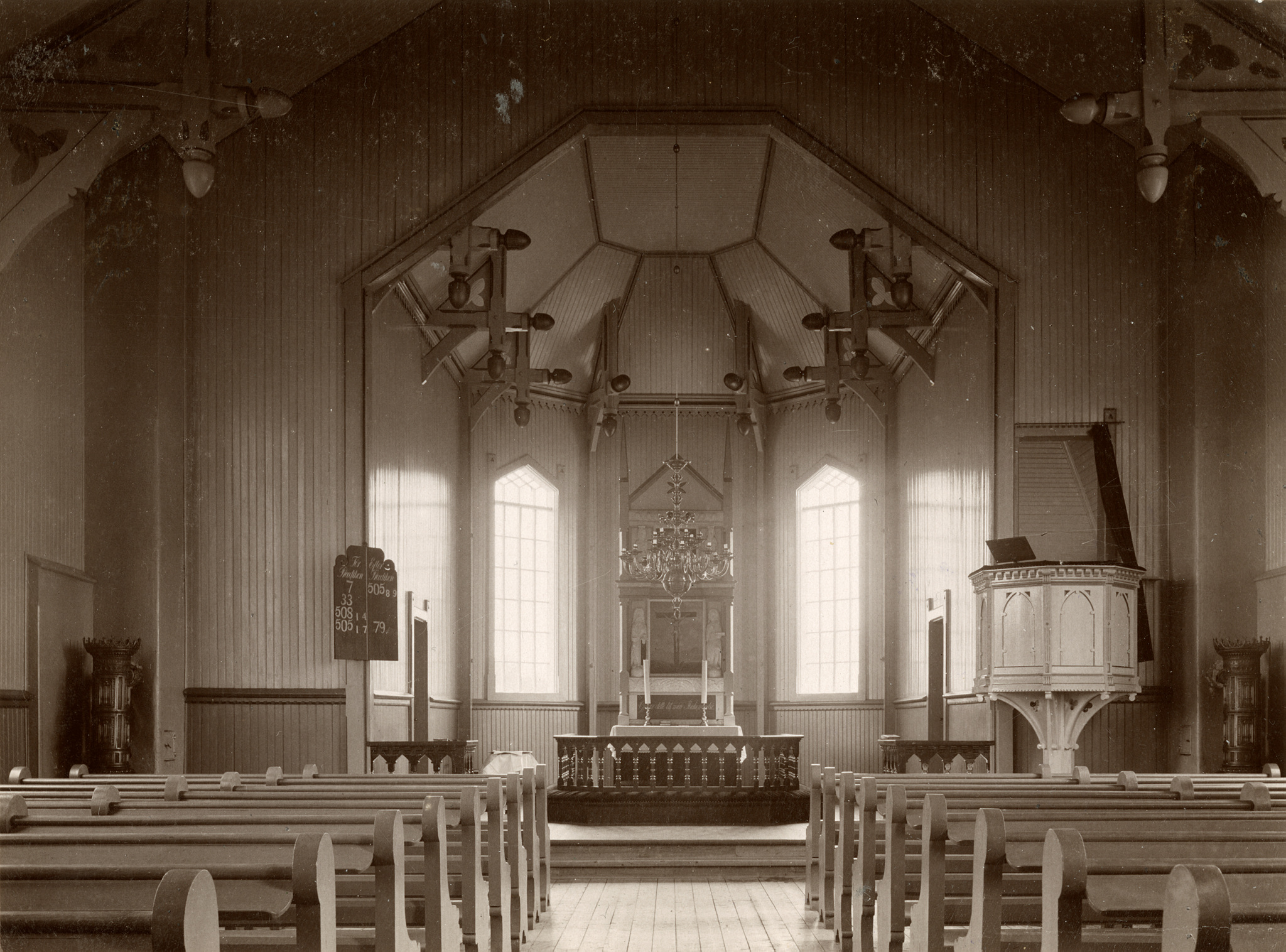
View of the interior

The earliest existing historical records of the church date back to the year 1533, but the church was likely built much earlier. The original church for Ekne was located at Jevika, about 1.5 kilometres (0.93 mi) northwest of the present site of the church. The church may have been built during the 14th century. Historically, the parish was called Ekne parish, but the church was called Gevig Church (an old spelling of Jevika). By the 17th century, the old church was in poor condition. In 1648, the church was repaired, but it was in such poor shape that by 1652, the old church was torn down and replaced with a new church on the same site. In 1672, the fairly new church was expanded by adding a new entry porch.

In 1689, there was a violent storm that caused major damage to the building. After the storm, the church was repaired including some foundation repairs. At the same time, a new separate free-standing bell tower was erected just outside of the cemetery that surrounded the church. In the 1860s and 1870s, there were discussions of a new church for the parish. In 1890, it was decided that the new church be built on the south side of the growing village of Ekne, where most of the parish residents lived. This new church site was about 1.5 kilometres (0.93 mi) southeast of the old church site. In the fall of 1892, the old church was torn down. Some of the better quality materials left over from the old church were reused in the construction of the new building. The new long church was completed in 1893 and it was consecrate on 27 June 1893. The church was extensively restored and renovated from 1953 to 1955 with a new consecration on 21 August 1955.

== See also ==
- List of churches in Nidaros
