= Okkenhaug Church =

Church in Trøndelag, Norway

- Okkenhaug kirke
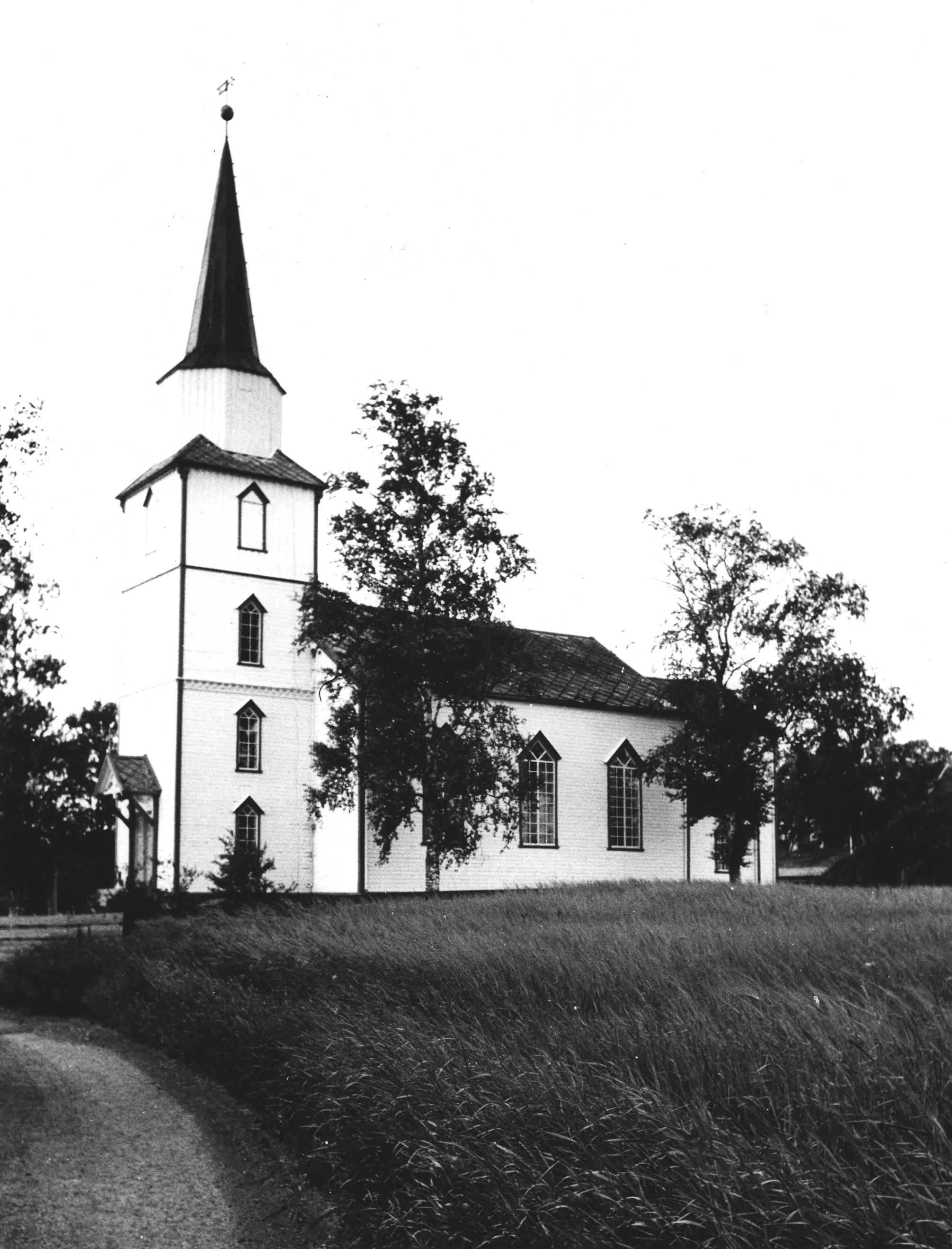
- View of the church
- Okkenhaug Church
- 63.728454127°N 11.451837569°E
- Location: Levanger Municipality, Trøndelag
- Country: Norway
- Denomination: Church of Norway
- Churchmanship: Evangelical Lutheran

History
- Status: Parish church
- Founded: 1893
- Consecrated: 1893

Architecture
- Functional status: Active
- Architect: Ole Andresen
- Architectural type: Long church
- Style: Neo-Gothic
- Completed: 1893 (133 years ago)

Specifications
- Capacity: 220
- Materials: Wood

Administration
- Diocese: Nidaros bispedømme
- Deanery: Stiklestad prosti
- Parish: Okkenhaug
- Norwegian Cultural Heritage Site
- Type: Church
- Status: Not protected
- ID: 85203

Okkenhaug Church (Norwegian: Okkenhaug kirke) is a parish church of the Church of Norway in Levanger Municipality in Trøndelag county, Norway.

== Location ==
It is located in the village of Okkenhaug. It is the church for the Okkenhaug parish which is part of the Stiklestad prosti (deanery) in the Diocese of Nidaros.

== History ==
The white, wooden church was built in a long church style in 1893 using plans drawn up by the architect Ole Andresen. The church seats about 220 people. The building was consecrated in 1893.

== See also ==
- List of churches in Nidaros
