= Markabygda =

Village in Levanger Municipality, Norway

Markabygda Markabygd / Markabygden
- Village
- Interactive map of Markabygda
- Location within Trøndelag Location within Norway
- Coordinates: 63.6373°N 11.2744°E
- Country: Norway
- Region: Central Norway
- County: Trøndelag
- District: Innherred
- Municipality: Levanger Municipality
- Elevation: 134 m (440 ft)
- Time zone: UTC+01:00 (CET)
  - Summer (DST): UTC+02:00 (CEST)
- Post Code: 7622 Markabygda

Markabygda is a village in Levanger Municipality in Trøndelag county, Norway. It is located on the northeast side of the lake Movatnet, about 15 kilometres (9.3 mi) south of the town of Levanger. Markabygda Church is located here, and there is also a private Montessori school.
