= Hammervatnet =

Lake in Trøndelag, Norway

- Interactive map of the lake
- Location: Levanger Municipality, Trøndelag
- Coordinates: 63.6138°N 11.0041°E
- Primary inflows: Fossingelva river
- Basin countries: Norway
- Max. length: 5.8 kilometres (3.6 mi)
- Max. width: 1.8 kilometres (1.1 mi)
- Surface area: 6.03 km^{2} (2.33 sq mi)
- Shore length^{1}: 21.4 kilometres (13.3 mi)
- Surface elevation: 25 metres (82 ft)
- References: NVE
- ^{1} Shore length is not a well-defined measure.

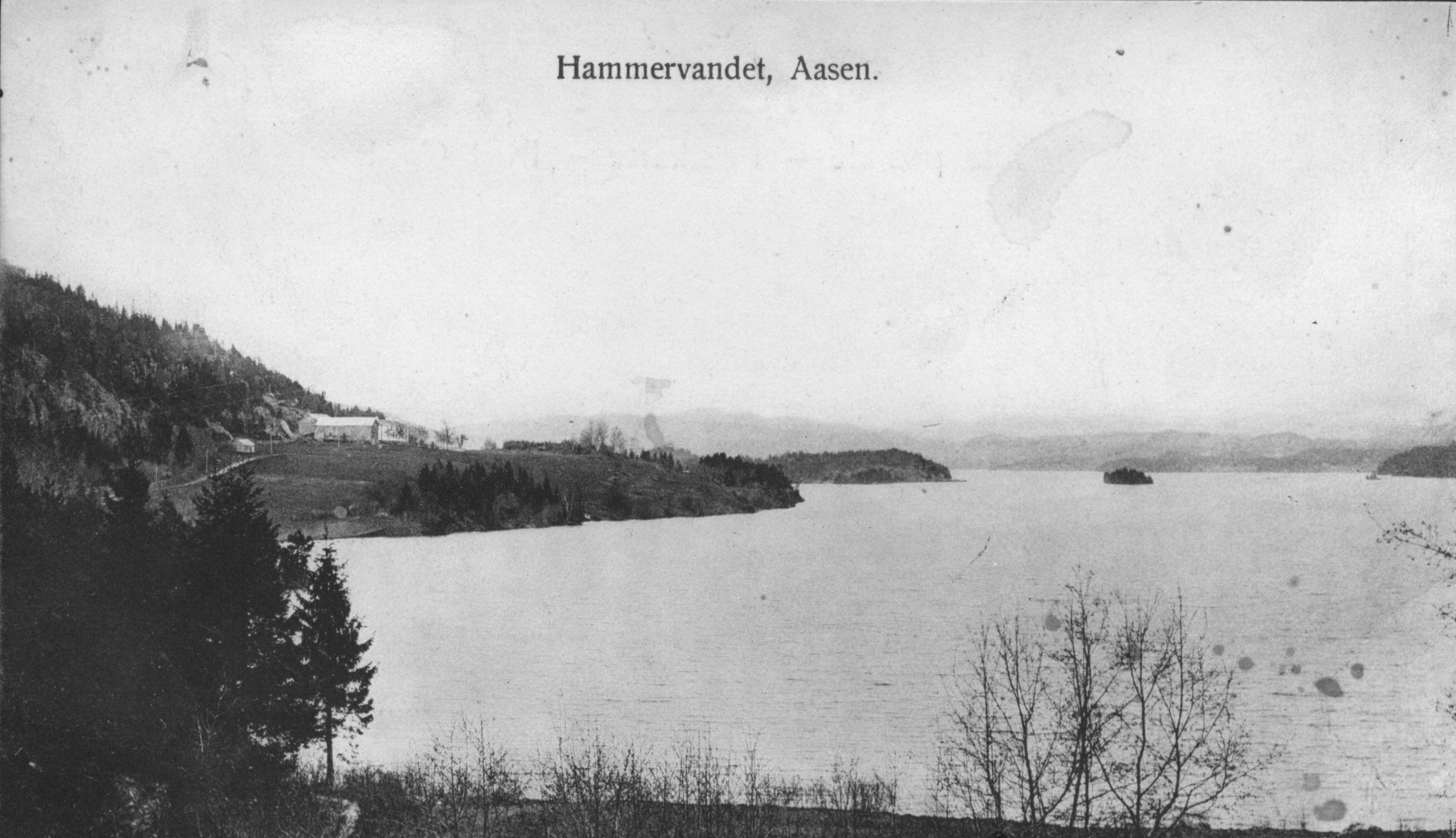
Hammervatnet Lake taken in the 1900s

Hammervatnet is a lake in Levanger Municipality in Trøndelag county, Norway. The 6.03-square-kilometre (2.33 sq mi) lake lies on the north side of the village of Åsen. The European route E6 highway runs along the eastern tip of the lake.

The nearby lake Hoklingen flows into the river Fossingelva which flows into Hammervatnet. The main outlet of Hammervatnet flows into the Hoplafjorden, an arm of the Trondheimsfjord. There are two large islands in the lake Hammervatnet: Innerøya and Ytterøya. The two islands are connected by a thin, marshy isthmus.

== See also ==
- List of lakes in Norway
