= Levanger (town) =

Town in Trøndelag, Norway

- Town/City
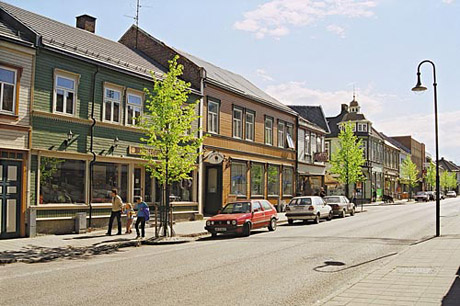
- View of the Kirkegata, the main street.
- Interactive map of Levanger
- Location within Trøndelag Location within Norway
- Coordinates: 63.7465°N 11.2987°E
- Country: Norway
- Region: Northern Norway
- County: Trøndelag
- District: Innherred
- Municipality: Levanger Municipality
- Established as
- Kjøpstad: 1836-1961
- Town (By): 1997

Area
  - Total: 5.32 km^{2} (2.05 sq mi)
- Elevation: 7 m (23 ft)

Population (2024)
  - Total: 10,813
  - Density: 2,033/km^{2} (5,270/sq mi)
- Demonym: Levangsbygg
- Time zone: UTC+01:00 (CET)
  - Summer (DST): UTC+02:00 (CEST)
- Postal Code: 7600 Levanger
- Former municipality
- Kjøpstaden Levanger
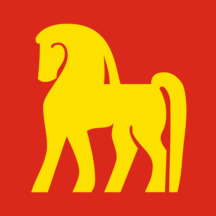
- Flag Coat of arms

- Location within Nord-Trøndelag Location within Norway
- Country: Norway
- County: Nord-Trøndelag
- District: Innherred
- Established: 1 Jan 1838
  - Created as: Formannskapsdistrikt
- Disestablished: 1 Jan 1962
  - Succeeded by: Levanger Municipality
- Administrative centre: Levanger
- Time zone: UTC+01:00 (CET)
  - Summer (DST): UTC+02:00 (CEST)
- ISO 3166 code: NO-1701

Levanger or Levangke (Southern Sami) is a town and the administrative center of Levanger Municipality in Trøndelag county, Norway. The university town is located along the eastern shore of the Trondheimsfjorden, at the mouth of the river Levangselva. The town is located about half-way between the towns of Steinkjer and Stjørdalshalsen. Prior to 1962, Levanger Municipality was coterminous with the town of Levanger and its immediate vicinity, but since 1962, the town has just been once small area within a much larger municipality. The town houses a campus of the Nord University.

The 5.32-square-kilometre (1,310-acre) town has a population (2024) of 10,813 and a population density of 2,033 inhabitants per square kilometre (5,270/sq mi).

== History ==
The kjøpstad of Levanger was founded by Carl III, king of Sweden, on 18 May 1836, on the site where the village of Levanger already existed. The village had expanded from the traditional winter fair, known as the marsimartnan (lit. 'the St. Marcus Market of Levanger'), dating back to the 13th century. In October 1836, as the town's borders set, Commissioner Mons Lie proposed that "the town shall bear the name of Carlslevanger, so the name of this ancient soil can be united with that of the new town's glorious founder". Despite the suggestion getting refused, the town protocols spoke of Carlslevanger Stad instead of Kjøpstaden Levanger until 1838. In 1838, the formannskapsdistrikt law classified this town as a ladested or port town.

The inhabitants of Levanger were not prepared at becoming a town, and so it took a long time before the town was constituted. In these early days the town was ruled by the Foged (Royal rural administrator). At that time there were already established a trade organization, "Levangerpatrisiatet" from 1695, based on the market. But only citizens of Trondheim could be members, until Levanger became a town in its own right. In 1839, the first guild of the town was established, and in the following years several new trades and craftsmen settled in the town.

In 1841, the first official elections were held, and Hans Nicolai Grønn was elected the first mayor of the town. Two years later, the town got its first water pipe system, its first two primitive street lamps and a town hall.

The fire-security report of 1844 clearly confirmed the great risk of disastrous fire in the town's narrow lanes; all houses were wooden houses. Therefore, the mayor hired major Johannes Sejersted to make a general report and draw up a new regulation plan, showing Levanger as a more "continental" town. Unfortunately, in 1846 (only two years later), the town was nearly totally ruined by a great fire. Maj. Sejersted's regulation plan was used when the town was rebuilt. Levanger has been damaged by two great fires since that time: in 1877 and 1897. Each time, however, the town was rebuilt as a wooden town, and still today most houses are wooden houses.

In 1856, the town was separated from the rural areas surrounding it. This left the town as a very small municipality with 1,017 residents and the surrounding areas (population: 2,290) became the new municipality called "Levanger landsogn".

Throughout the 19th century, the famous market's economical importance faded out, and the ancient arrangement was reduced to a tradition without much content. That was the end of Levanger as an important port of foreign trade between Sweden and Norway. However, in the early 20th century, the town of Levanger was pleased by new establishments such as a county hospital and college of education. The German occupation in 1940 was the beginning of a 40-year-long "interregnum" of the traditional "Marsimartnan".

During the 1960s, there were many municipal mergers across Norway due to the work of the Schei Committee. In 1961, planning for a large municipal merger involving the town of Levanger was planned. On 1 January 1962, the following areas were merged to form a new, larger Levanger Municipality:

- Skogn Municipality (population: 4,756)
- Frol Municipality (population: 3,774)
- Åsen Municipality (population: 1,939)
- the town of Levanger (population: 1,669)

Upon the merger in 1962, however, the town of Levanger lost its official "town status".

On 1 January 1964, the neighboring Ytterøy Municipality was merged into Levanger Municipality as well.

In 1989, the "Marsimartnan" fair was brought back. As a result of this and some changes to Norwegian law, the municipal council voted in 1997 to re-establish the town status of what used to be the town of Levanger.

The town is laid out according to an urban and regulated plot with proper streets such as Kirkegata, the main road in the town, and it has a townhall and a city square. It is commonly seen by residents that Levanger has always been a town, though not always officially, and many inhabitant in the town area take pride in this. Thus there does exist a sense of distinction between town people, and the people from the surrounding countryside.

In 2002, Levanger joined the Cittaslow movement, although there have been some violations of the Cittaslow charter, of which can be mentioned the construction of the unharmonic new mini mall in Sjøgata, down by the seaside. This mini mall includes the post office, a grocery store, and an electrical appliances store.

Subsequent to a merger of several institutions of higher education, including the former Høgskolen i Nord-Trøndelag, Levanger houses a campus of the Nord University as of 2016.

== Name ==
The town is named after the old Levanger farm (Old Norse: Lifangr) since the first Levanger Church was built there. The first element is Lif which means "sheltered". The last element is angr which means "fjord".

== Coat of arms ==
The coat of arms was granted on 25 November 1960 as the arms of the town of Levanger. The arms show a gold-colored horse on a red background. The horse is a symbol for the town as a major trading center between Sweden and Norway for many centuries. The arms did not change after the addition of the other municipalities (they had no arms when they were merged with Levanger).

== Media gallery ==
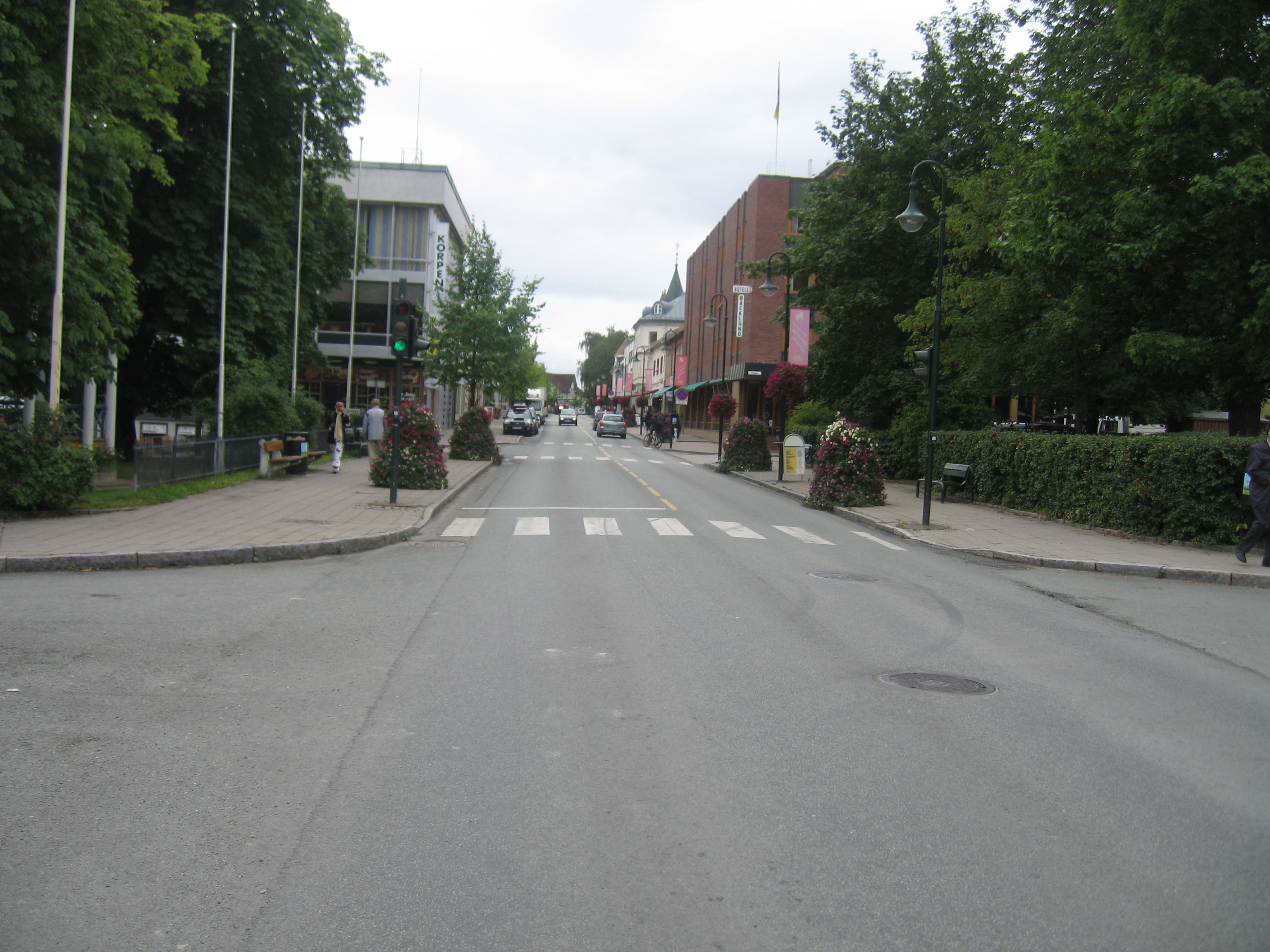
Kirkegata

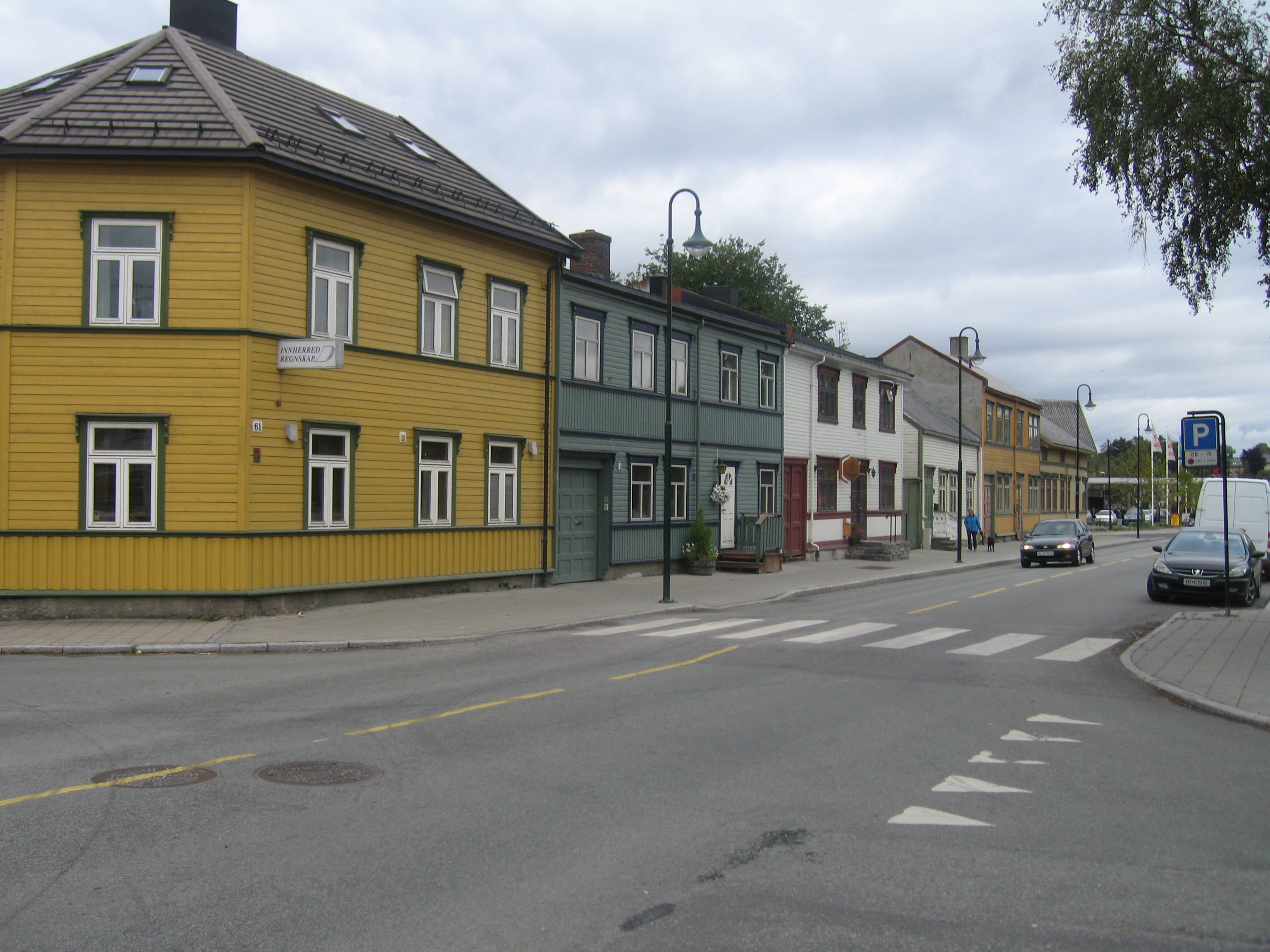
Kirkegata

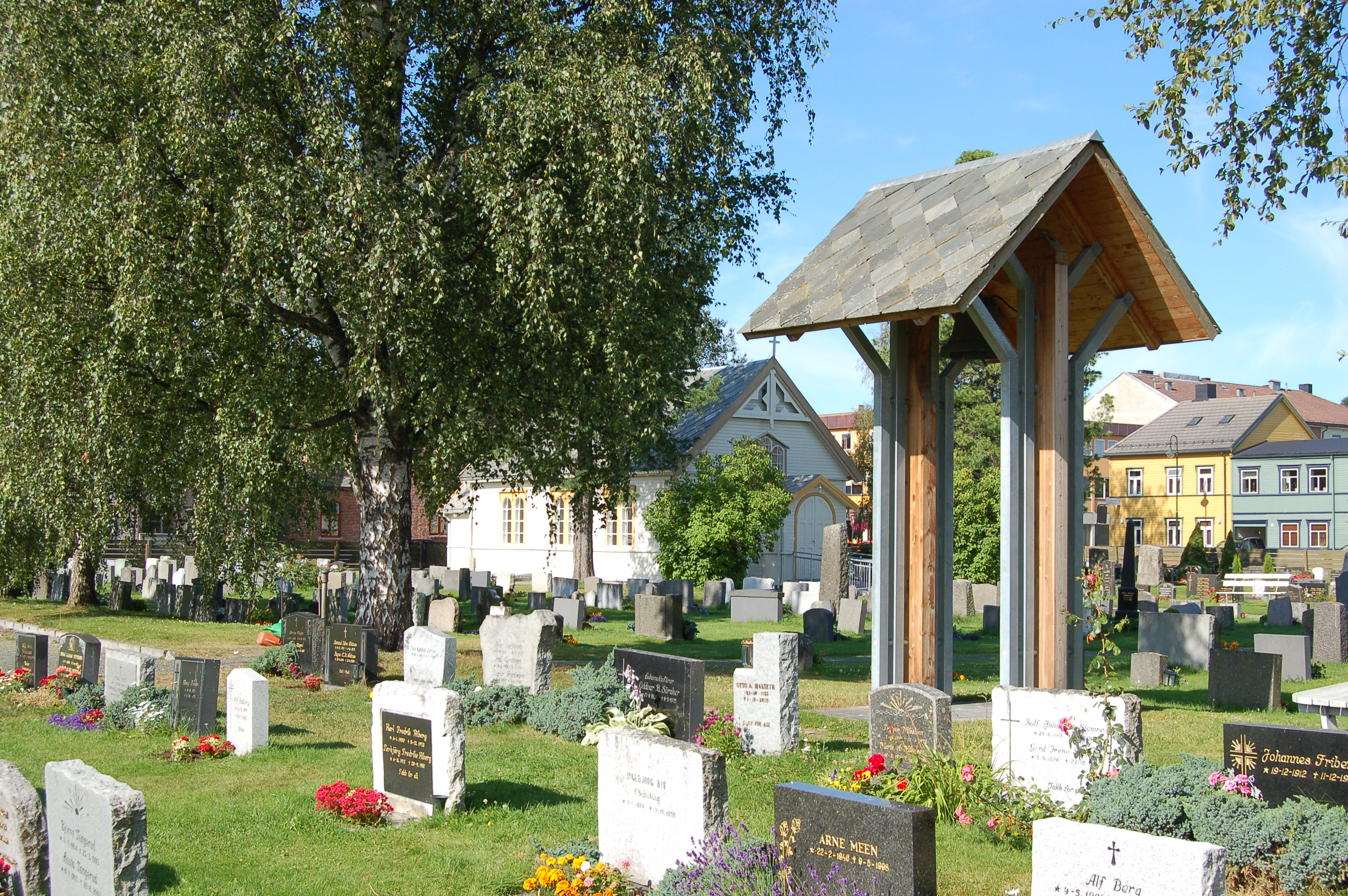
Church yard

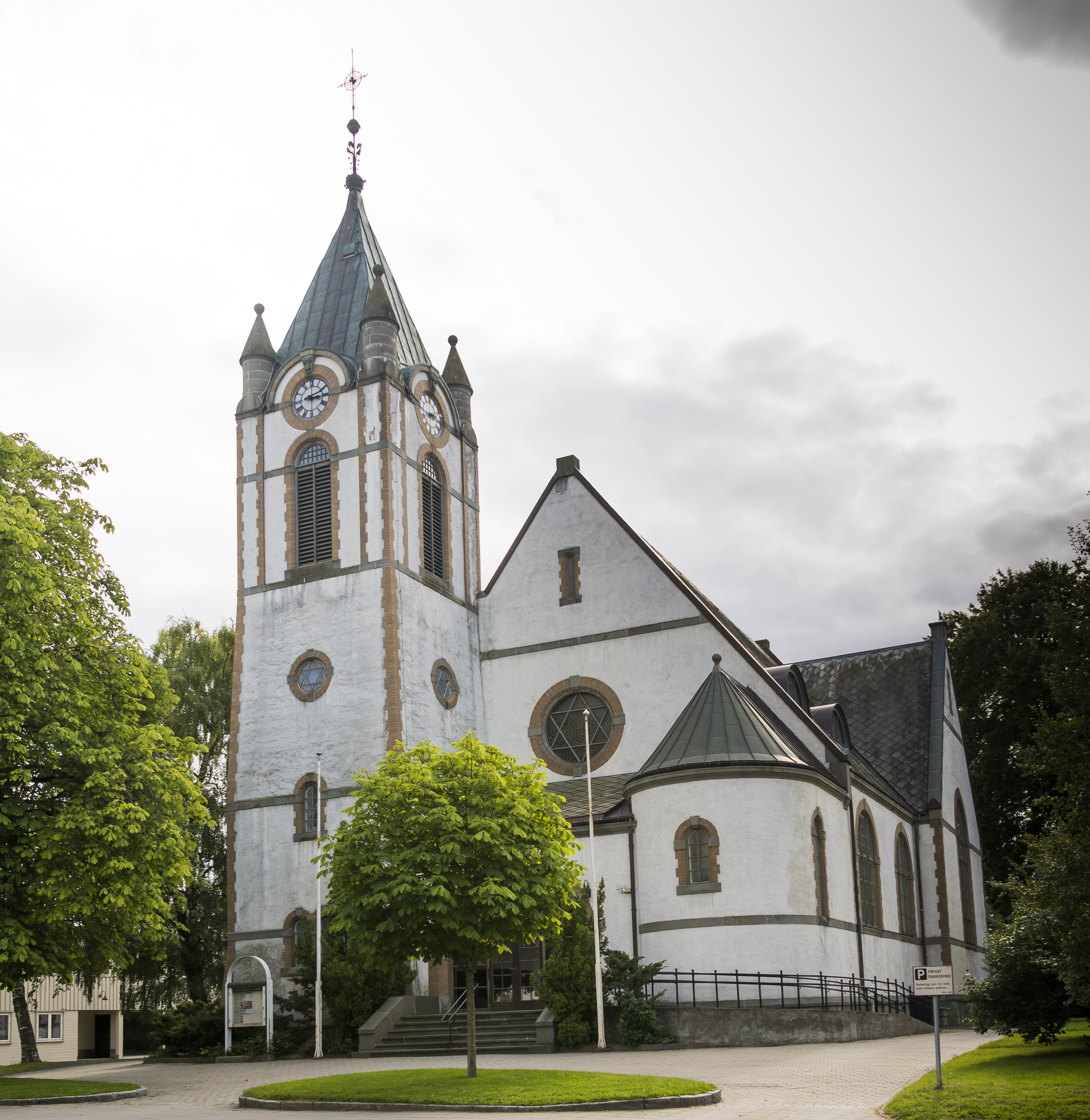
Levanger Church

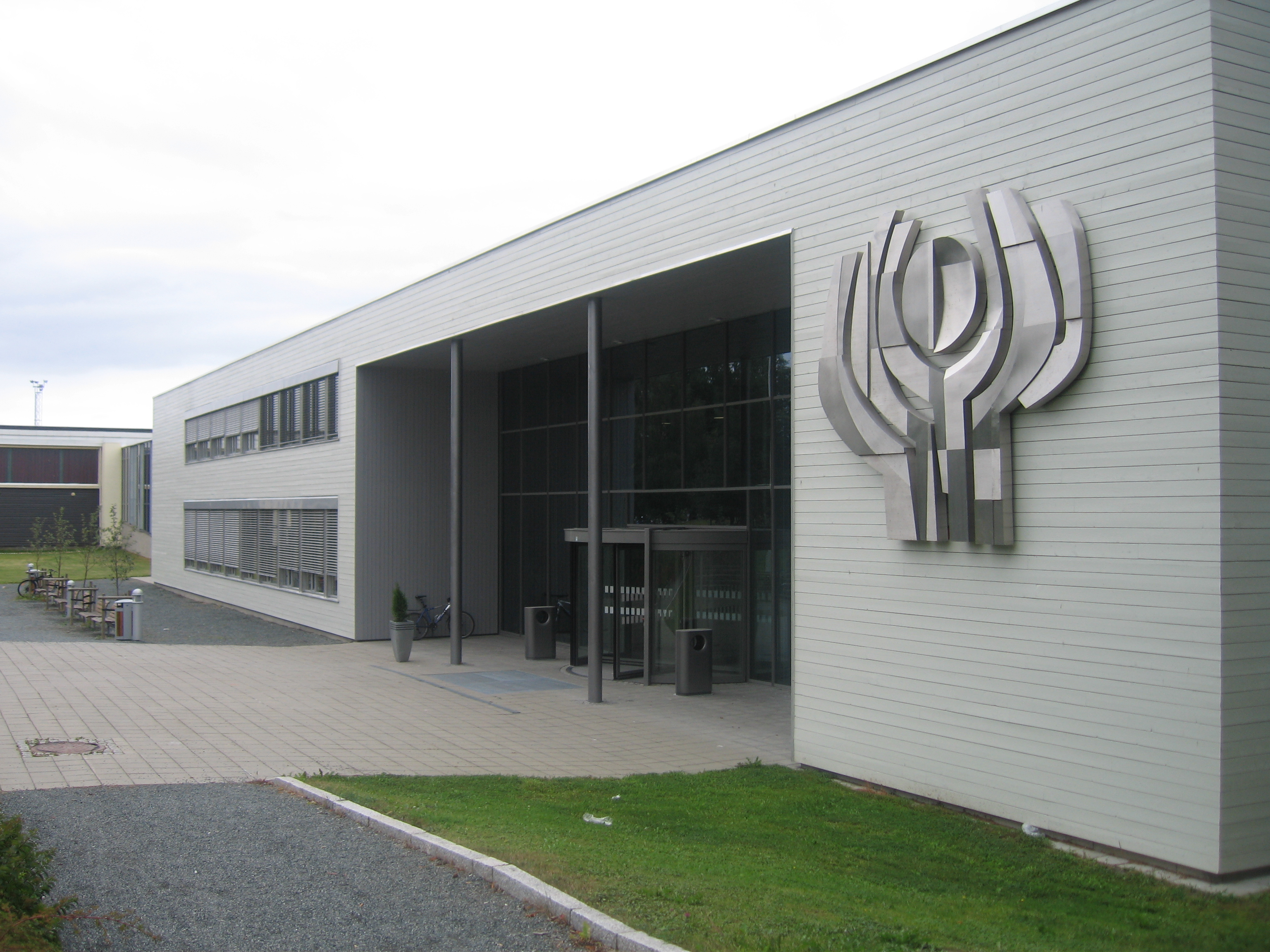
School

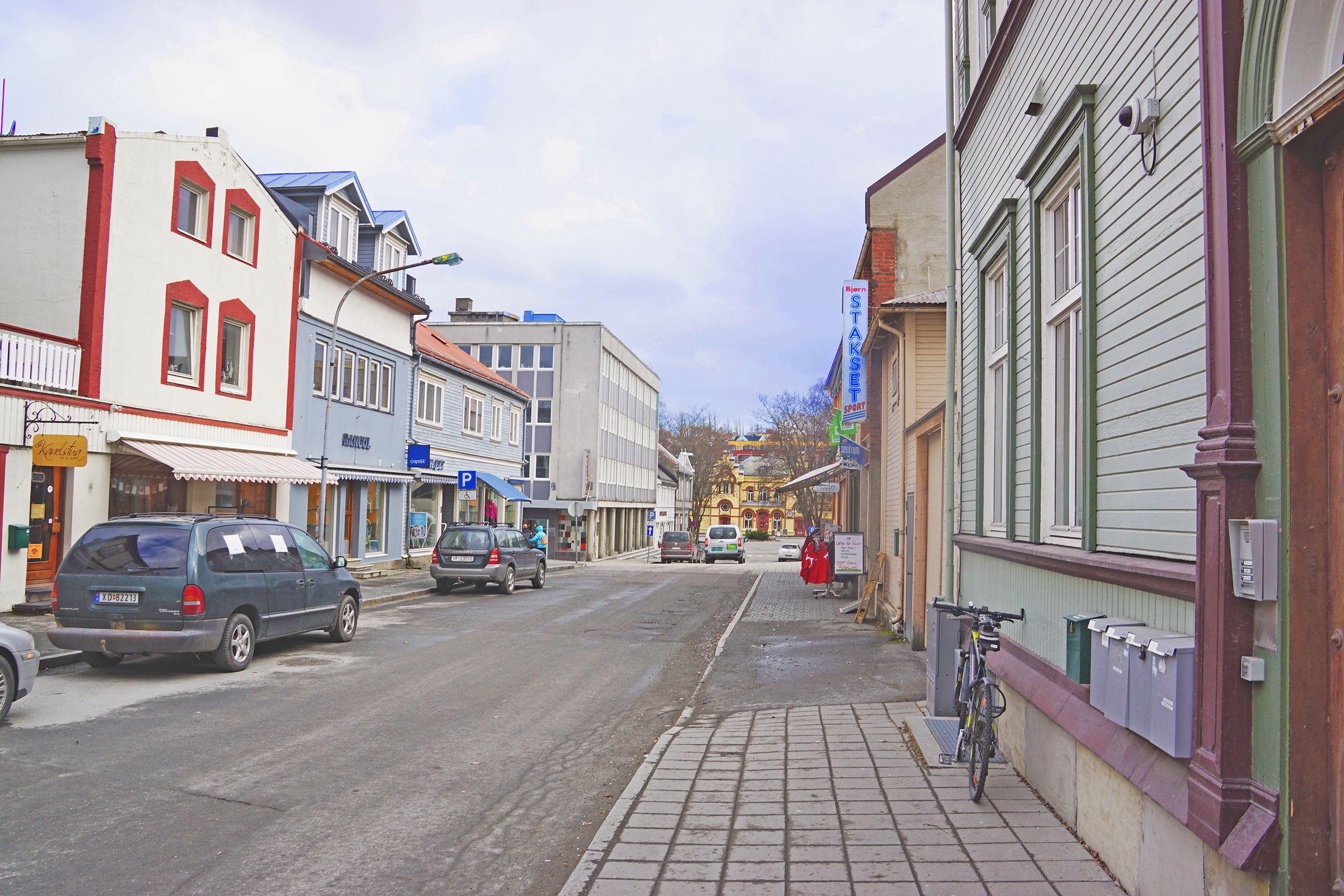
Sverres gate

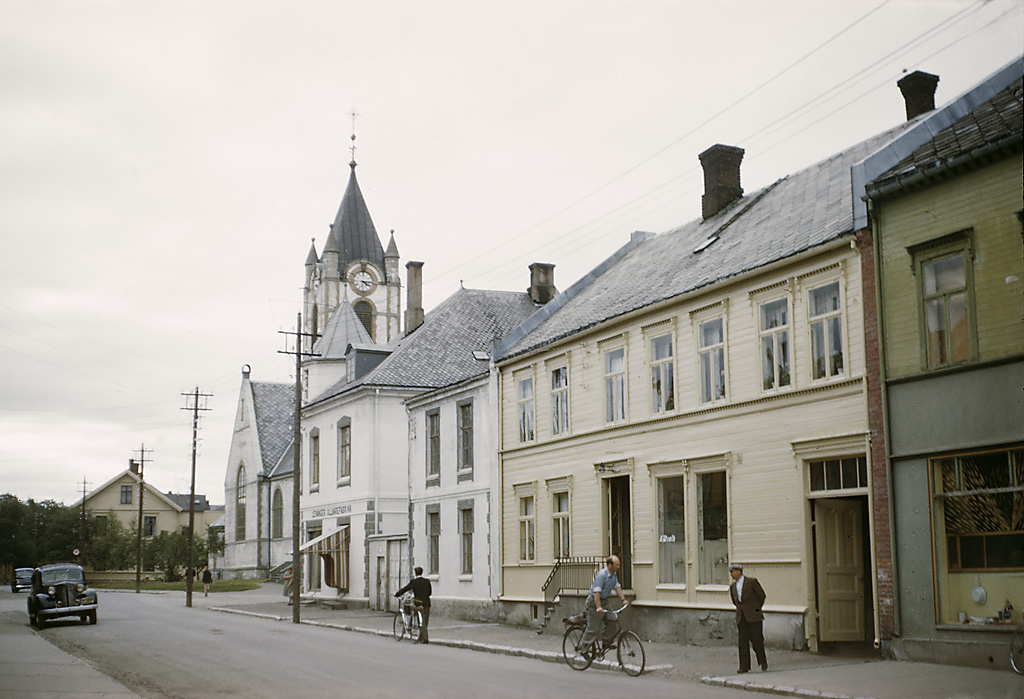
Road in Levanger

== See also ==
- List of former municipalities of Norway
