= Wold =

Wold may refer to:

== Radio stations ==
- WOLD-FM, an American radio station licensed to Marion, Virginia
- WOLD-LP, an American radio station licensed to Woodbridge, New Jersey
- WHNK (AM), an American radio station licensed as "WOLD" from 1962 to 2006

== Places ==
- Wold, an Old English term for an unforested area of high ground
  - The Wolds, a term used in England to describe a range of hills consisting of open country overlying limestone or chalk
- Old, Northamptonshire, a village in England, former name Wold

== Other uses ==
- Wold (surname)
- The Wold, the northern region of Rohan, in J. R. R. Tolkien's Middle-earth legendarium
- W.O.L.D., a 1974 hit single by Harry Chapin

== See also ==
- Weald, an area of South East England between the parallel chalk escarpments of the North and the South Downs
- Wood
- Wald (disambiguation)
- Wold's decomposition
- Wold's theorem
- Cramér–Wold theorem
- Wold Newton family, a fictional creation of Philip José Farmer
