= Peter Whittle (mathematician) =

New Zealand mathematician and statistician (1927–2021)

- Born: 27 February 1927; Wellington, New Zealand
- Died: 10 August 2021 (aged 94)
- Education: University of New Zealand (MSc 1948); Uppsala University (PhD 1953)
- Known for: Multivariate Wold theorem in time series analysis Reproducing kernel Hilbert space techniques Whittle likelihood Hypothesis testing in time series analysis Optimal control Queuing theory Network flows Kiefer-Wolfowitz theorem in Bayesian experimental design
- Spouse: Käthe Blomquist (m. 1951)
- Children: 6
- Awards: Fellow of the Royal Society (UK) (1978); Fellow of the Royal Society of New Zealand; Guy Medal (Silver, 1966) (Gold, 1996); Sylvester Medal (1994); John von Neumann Theory Prize (1997); Frederick W. Lanchester Prize (1986)
- Scientific career
- Fields: Statistics; Applied mathematics Operations research Control theory
- Workplaces: Uppsala University (1949–1953); DSIR, New Zealand (1953–1959); University of Cambridge (1959–1961); University of Manchester (1961–1967); University of Cambridge (1967–1994)
- Thesis: Hypothesis Testing in Time Series Analysis (1951)
- Doctoral advisor: Herman Wold
- Doctoral students: Frank Kelly; Sir John Kingman (initial studies)
- Other notable students: Sir John Kingman

Peter Whittle (27 February 1927 – 10 August 2021) was a mathematician and statistician from New Zealand, working in the fields of stochastic nets, optimal control, time series analysis, stochastic optimisation and stochastic dynamics. From 1967 to 1994, he was the Churchill Professor of Mathematics for Operational Research at the University of Cambridge.

== Career ==
Whittle was born in Wellington. He graduated from the University of New Zealand in 1947 with a BSc in mathematics and physics and in 1948 with an MSc in mathematics.

He then moved to Uppsala, Sweden in 1950 to study for his PhD with Herman Wold (at Uppsala University). His thesis, Hypothesis Testing in Time Series, generalised Wold's autoregressive representation theorem for univariate stationary processes to multivariate processes. Whittle's thesis was published in 1951^{[2]}. A synopsis of Whittle's thesis also appeared as an appendix to the second edition of Wold's book on time-series analysis. Whittle remained in Uppsala at the Statistics Institute as a docent until 1953, when he returned to New Zealand.

In New Zealand, Whittle worked at the Department of Scientific and Industrial Research (DSIR) in the Applied Mathematics Laboratory (later named the Applied Mathematics Division).

In 1959 Whittle was appointed to a lectureship in Cambridge University. Whittle was appointed Professor of Mathematical statistics at the University of Manchester in 1961. After six years in Manchester, Whittle returned to Cambridge as the Churchill Professor of Mathematics for Operational Research, a post he held until his retirement in 1994. From 1973, he was also Director of the Statistical Laboratory, University of Cambridge. He was a fellow of Churchill College, Cambridge. He died in Cambridge, England.

== Recognition ==
Whittle was elected a Fellow of the Royal Society in 1978, and an Honorary Fellow of the Royal Society of New Zealand in 1981. The Royal Society awarded him their Sylvester Medal in 1994 in recognition of his "major distinctive contributions to time series analysis, to optimisation theory, and to a wide range of topics in applied probability theory and the mathematics of operational research". In 1986, the Institute for Operations Research and the Management Sciences awarded Whittle the Lanchester Prize for his book Systems in Stochastic Equilibrium (ISBN 0-471-90887-8) and the John von Neumann Theory Prize in 1997 for his "outstanding contributions to the theory of operations research and management science". He was elected to the 2002 class of Fellows of the Institute for Operations Research and the Management Sciences.

== Personal life ==
In 1951, Whittle married a Finnish woman, Käthe Blomquist, whom he had met in Sweden. The Whittle family has six children.

== Bibliography ==
=== Books ===
- Whittle, P. (1951). Hypothesis testing in times series analysis. Uppsala: Almqvist & Wiksells Boktryckeri AB.
- Whittle, P. (1963). Prediction and Regulation. English Universities Press.
  Republished as: Whittle, P. (1983). Prediction and Regulation by Linear Least-Square Methods. University of Minnesota Press. ISBN 0-8166-1148-3.
- Whittle, P. (1970). Probability (Library of university mathematics). Penguin. ISBN 0-14-080085-9.
  Republished as: Whittle, P. (30 April 1976). Probability. John Wiley and Sons Ltd. ISBN 0-471-01657-8.
- Whittle, P. (28 July 1971). Optimization Under Constraints. John Wiley and Sons Ltd. ISBN 0-471-94130-1.
- Whittle, P. (4 August 1982). Optimization Over Time. John Wiley and Sons Ltd. ISBN 0-471-10120-6.
- Whittle, P. (April 1983). Optimization Over Time: Dynamic Programming and Stochastic Control. John Wiley and Sons Ltd. ISBN 0-471-10496-5.
- Whittle, P. (4 June 1986). Systems in Stochastic Equilibrium. John Wiley and Sons Ltd. ISBN 0-471-90887-8.
- Whittle, P. (April 1990). Risk-Sensitive Optimal Control. John Wiley and Sons Ltd. ISBN 0-471-92622-1.
- Whittle, P. (14 May 1992). Probability Via Expectation (3rd ed.). Springer Verlag. ISBN 0-387-97758-9.
  Republished as: Whittle, P. (20 April 2000). Probability Via Expectation (4th ed.). Springer. ISBN 0-387-98955-2.
- Whittle, P. (18 July 1996). Optimal Control: Basics and Beyond. John Wiley and Sons Ltd. ISBN 0-471-95679-1.
- Whittle, P. (8 December 1998). Neural Nets and Chaotic Carriers. John Wiley and Sons Ltd. ISBN 0-471-98541-4.
- Whittle, P. (31 May 2007). Networks: Optimisation and Evolution. Cambridge University Press. ISBN 9780521871006.

=== Selected articles ===
- Whittle, P. (1953). "The analysis of multiple stationary time series". Journal of the Royal Statistical Society, Series B. 15 (1): 125–139. doi:10.1111/j.2517-6161.1953.tb00131.x. JSTOR 2983728.
  - Reprinted with an introduction by Matthew Calder and Richard A. Davis as Whittle, P. (1997). "The analysis of multiple stationary time series". In Samuel Kotz and Norman L. Johnson (ed.). Breakthroughs in statistics, Volume III. Springer Series in Statistics: Perspectives in Statistics. New York: Springer-Verlag. pp. 141–169. ISBN 0-387-94988-7.
- Whittle, Peter (1954). "On stationary processes in the plane". Biometrika. 41 (3–4): 434–449. doi:10.1093/biomet/41.3-4.434.
  - Reprinted as Whittle, Peter (2001). "On stationary processes in the plane". In D. M. Titterington and D. R. Cox (ed.). Biometrika: One Hundred Years. Oxford University Press. pp. 293–308. ISBN 0-19-850993-6.
- Whittle, P. (May 1954). "Optimum preventative sampling". Journal of the Operations Research Society of America. 2 (2): 197–203. doi:10.1287/opre.2.2.197. JSTOR 166605.
- Whittle, P. (1973). "Some general points in the theory of optimal experimental design". Journal of the Royal Statistical Society, Series B. 35: 123–130. doi:10.1111/j.2517-6161.1973.tb00944.x.
- Whittle, Peter (1980). "Multi-armed bandits and the Gittins index". Journal of the Royal Statistical Society Ser. B (Methodology). 42 (2): 143–149.
- Whittle, Peter (1981). "Arm-acquiring bandits". Annals of Probability. 9: 284–292. doi:10.1214/aop/1176994469. (Available online)
- Whittle, Peter (1988). "Restless bandits: Activity allocation in a changing world". Journal of Applied Probability. 25A (Special volume: A celebration of applied probability (A festschrift for Joe Gani)): 287–298. doi:10.1017/s0021900200040420. MR 0974588.
- Whittle, P. (1991). "Likelihood and cost as path integrals (With discussion and a reply by the author)". Journal of the Royal Statistical Society, Series B. 53 (3): 505–538. doi:10.1111/j.2517-6161.1991.tb01842.x.
- Whittle, Peter (2002). "Applied probability in Great Britain (50th anniversary issue of Operations Research)". Oper. Res. 50 (1): 227–239. doi:10.1287/opre.50.1.227.17792.

=== Biographical works ===
- Kelly, F. P. (1994). Probability, statistics and optimisation: A Tribute to Peter Whittle. Chicheter: John Wiley & Sons. ISBN 0-471-94829-2.
  - Peter Whittle. 1994. "Almost Home". pages 1–28.
  - Anonymous. "Publications of Peter Whittle". pages xxi–xxvi. (A list of 129 publications.)
  - Anonymous. Biographical sketch (untitled). page xxvii.
