= Matern =

Matern or Matérn is a surname. It can also be a masculine given name. Notable people with this name include:

== As a surname ==
- Anik Matern, Canadian actress
- Bertil Matérn (1917–2007), Swedish statistician
- Hermann Matern (1893–1971), German communist
- Max Matern (1902–1935), German communist
- Nico Matern (born 1992), German football player

== As a given name ==
- Matern von Marschall (born 1962), German politician

== See also ==
- Maternal, meaning related to mothers
- Matérn covariance function in statistics
