= Ignatov's theorem =

Mathematical theorem

In probability and mathematical statistics, Ignatov's theorem is a basic result on the distribution of record values of a stochastic process.

== Statement ==
Let X_{1}, X_{2}, ... be an infinite sequence of independent and identically distributed random variables. The initial rank of the nth term of this sequence is the value r such that X_{i} ≥ X_{n} for exactly r values of i less than or equal to n. Let Y_{k} = (Y_{k,1}, Y_{k,2}, Y_{k,3}, ...) denote the stochastic process consisting of the terms X_{i} having initial rank k; that is, Y_{k,j} is the jth term of the stochastic process that achieves initial rank k. The sequence Y_{k} is called the sequence of kth partial records. Ignatov's theorem states that the sequences Y_{1}, Y_{2}, Y_{3}, ... are independent and identically distributed.

== Note ==
The theorem is named after Tzvetan Ignatov (1942–2024), a Bulgarian professor in probability and mathematical statistics at Sofia University. Due to it and his general contributions to mathematics, Prof. Ignatov was granted a Doctor Honoris Causa degree in 2013 from Sofia University. The recognition is given on extremely rare occasions and only to scholars with internationally landmark results.
