= Karl-Johan Hedqvist =

Karl-Johan Hedqvist (18 July 1917 – 27 December 2009) was a Swedish entomologist who focused on wasps (Hymenoptera), especially chalcid wasps and other parasitoid wasps. He described 260 species and over 70 genera of wasps.

Hedqvist was born on 18 July 1917 in Bodarna of Västerbotten County in northern Sweden. In 1939, he took his first insect-related job as a field assistant looking at forest pest insects. Retaining a focus on forest entomology, he moved to Stockholm for further studies and an assistant position at the Swedish Forest Research Institute from 1949. In this capacity, he travelled extensively around Sweden, working on pest management. At the same time he was accumulated up a large personal insect collection and started publishing widely (from 1945) on faunistics and applied entomology, on a subjects across the major insect orders Coleoptera, Lepidoptera, Hymenoptera and Hemiptera. In 1951 he married and settled in Vallentuna, north of Stockholm. He and his wife eventually had two children.

In the mid 1950s, Hedqvist embarked upon his career as a taxonomist, describing first a new bark beetle and then what would become a very large number of Hymenoptera species and genera. In 1959 he was employed as a research assistant position at the Swedish Museum of Natural History (NHRM, for Naturhistoriska riksmuseet), where he had the opportunity to focus more on taxonomy. Nevertheless, he left the position in favour of employment as a field entomologist back at the Swedish Forest Research Institute in 1963. In 1971, he moved back to the NHRM, holding a newly established position as a taxonomist with special focus on parasitoid wasps, funded by the Swedish Research Council. Hedqvist received an honorary doctorate from Uppsala University in 1977 for his work on the taxonomy of parasitoids. During his time at NHRM he supervised two successful PhD students in the systematics of parasitoid wasps. Hedqvist stayed at the Stockholm museum until his retirement in 1984. After retirement, he kept up his taxonomic and faunistic work from home, as well as his active involvement in the Stockholm Entomological Society, including serving as president, but published only a few more taxonomic contributions. In 2003 he published a checklist of chalcid wasps of Sweden, based primarily on his own collection, that is known as likely the most comprehensive database of Swedish chalcids. He died on 27 December 2009. In 2011 his collection of more than 50,000 Hymenoptera from around the world was purchased from his relatives by the Natural History Museum, London. At least six species of wasps have been named for Hedqvist.
