= Åsen =

Village in Levanger Municipality, Norway

- Village
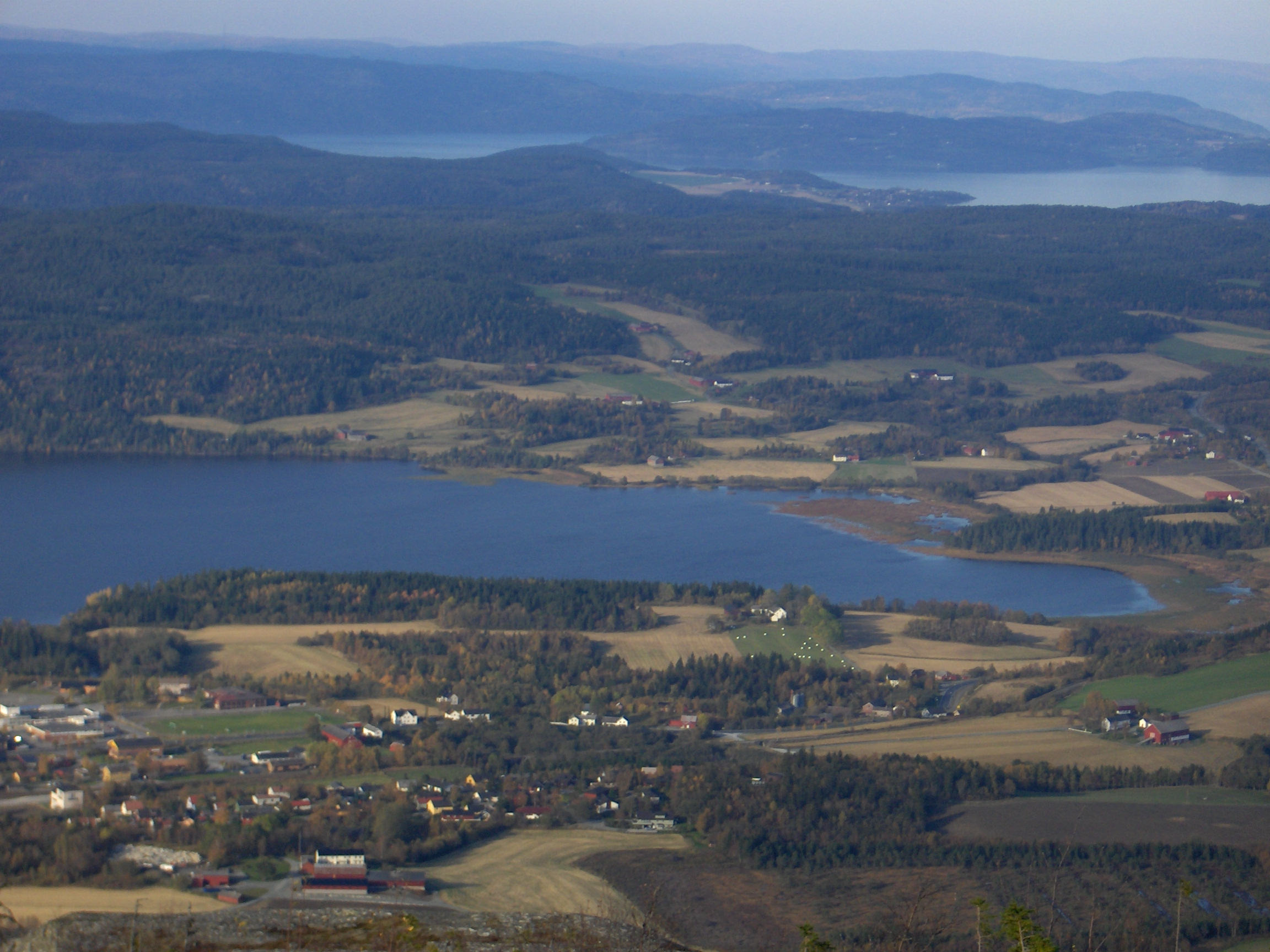
- View of the village
- Interactive map of Åsen
- Location within Trøndelag Location within Norway
- Coordinates: 63.6106°N 11.0517°E
- Country: Norway
- Region: Central Norway
- County: Trøndelag
- District: Innherred
- Municipality: Levanger Municipality

Area
  - Total: 0.57 km^{2} (0.22 sq mi)
- Elevation: 70 m (230 ft)

Population (2024)
  - Total: 684
  - Density: 1,200/km^{2} (3,100/sq mi)
- Time zone: UTC+01:00 (CET)
  - Summer (DST): UTC+02:00 (CEST)
- Post Code: 7630 Åsen

Åsen is a village in Levanger Municipality in Trøndelag county, Norway. The village is located between the lakes Hammervatnet and Hoklingen. The European route E06 highway and the Nordlandsbanen railway line both pass through the village. The train stops at Åsen Station. The village is centered around the agriculture and forestry industries. There is also some woodworking industries, including an organ-making factory. The village is also the site of Åsen Church.

The 0.57-square-kilometre (140-acre) village has a population (2024) of 684 and a population density of 1,200 inhabitants per square kilometre (3,100/sq mi).

From 1838 until 1962, the village of Åsen was the administrative centre of the old Åsen Municipality.

== See also ==
- John Johnsen Wold
