= Woldu =

Woldu is a surname. Notable people with the surname include:

- Birhan Woldu (born 1981), Ethiopian nurse famous as a starving child
- Paul Woldu (born 1984), Canadian football player
- Sabagadis Woldu (1780–1831), Ethiopian governor
- Tekeste Woldu (born 1945), Ethiopian cyclist

== See also ==
- Wold (surname)
