= Pyrrho's lemma =

In statistics, Pyrrho's lemma is the result that if one adds just one extra variable as a regressor from a suitable set to a linear regression model, one can get any desired outcome in terms of the coefficients (signs and sizes), as well as predictions, the R-squared, the t-statistics, prediction- and confidence-intervals. The argument regarding the behavior of coefficients was advanced by Herman Wold and Lars Juréen but named, extended to include the other statistics, and explained more fully by Theo Dijkstra. Dijkstra named it after the skeptic philosopher Pyrrho and concludes his article by noting that this lemma provides "some ground for a wide-spread scepticism concerning products of extensive datamining". One can only prove that a model 'works' by testing it on data different from the data that gave it birth.

The result has been discussed in the context of econometrics.
