= Åsen Church =

Church in Trøndelag, Norway

- Åsen kirke
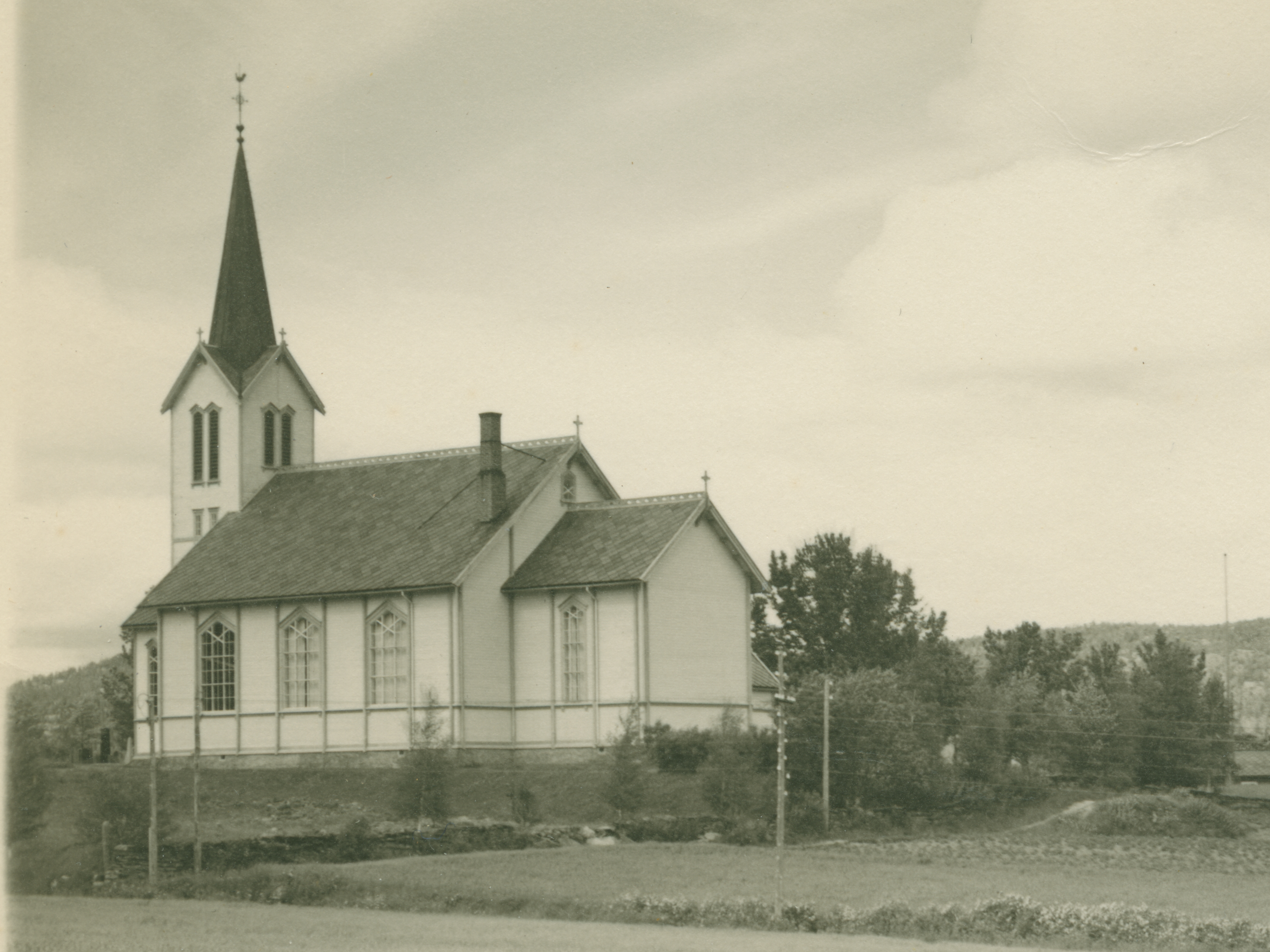
- View of the church
- Åsen Church
- 63.60625626°N 11.03825703°E
- Location: Levanger Municipality, Trøndelag
- Country: Norway
- Denomination: Church of Norway
- Churchmanship: Evangelical Lutheran

History
- Status: Parish church
- Founded: 13th century
- Consecrated: 31 Aug 1904

Architecture
- Functional status: Active
- Architect: Ole Røising
- Architectural type: Long church
- Style: Swiss chalet style
- Completed: 1904 (122 years ago)

Specifications
- Capacity: 400
- Materials: Wood

Administration
- Diocese: Nidaros bispedømme
- Deanery: Stiklestad prosti
- Parish: Åsen
- Norwegian Cultural Heritage Site
- Type: Church
- Status: Not protected
- ID: 85994

Åsen Church (Norwegian: Åsen kirke) is a parish church of the Church of Norway in Levanger Municipality in Trøndelag county, Norway. It is located in the village of Åsen. It is the church for the Åsen parish which is part of the Stiklestad prosti (deanery) in the Diocese of Nidaros. The white, wooden church was built in a long church plan and in a Swiss chalet style in 1904 using plans drawn up by the architect Ole Røising. The church seats about 400 people.

== History ==
The earliest existing historical records of the church date back to the year 1432, but the church was not new at that time. The first church in Åsen was a stave church that was located at Vang, about 2 kilometres (1.2 mi) northeast of the present church site. This church was likely built during the 13th century. During the first half of the 17th century, the old stave church was torn down and replaced with a new timber-framed church on the same site. The new church had a rectangular nave with a narrower, rectangular chancel with a lower roof line. There was a tower on the west end of the roof of the nave. A small sacristy was built on the south side of the choir in 1646.

The Åsen area had two church sites in the Middle Ages: Vang and Lo. There were gradually discussions about combining the two church sites in a more central place in the village. It was agreed to close down the Lo Church and move the Vang church to the village of Åsen where it would be renamed Aasen kirke. A building application was submitted in 1855. The drawings were not accepted, but the ministry provided drawings prepared by Christian H. Grosch. In 1856 a royal decree granted permission to build a new church on the present church site. The new church was consecrated on 5 December 1858, but the church was not completely finished until 1860.

The church was a log long church. The church had a tower on the west end, a choir on the east end, with a nave in the middle. Inside, there was a sacristy on the north and south sides of the choir. On the altar stood a painted cross. Around the year 1900, there were discussions of renovating the church. The plans were to take down the second floor seating galleries on the sides, rearranging the choir, and painting the whole interior. They started the renovation on 1 December 1902. On Christmas night, just a few weeks later, lightning struck the church tower and the church burned down, leaving nothing behind.

A new church was quickly designed by builder Ole Andreas Røising, and the lead builder was Gunerius Rabben from Ørland Municipality. The church was consecrated on 31 August 1904. It is a wooden long church with about 400 seats. The church has a west tower flanked by a staircase. A sacristy was built on the north side of the choir.

== Media gallery ==
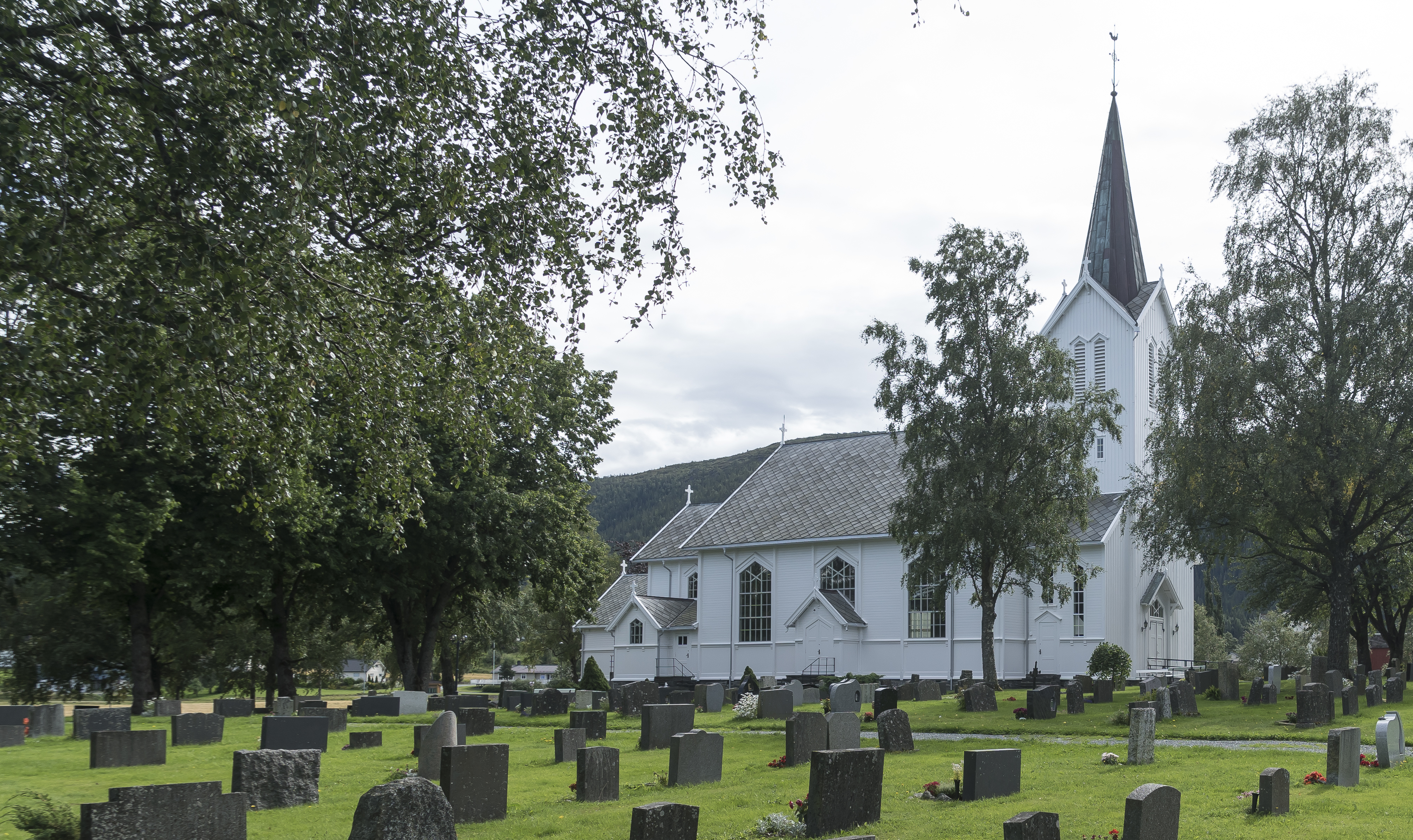
Side view (2016)

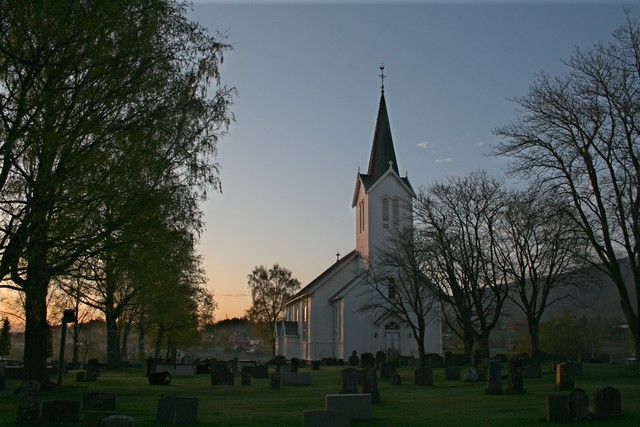
Front view (2016)

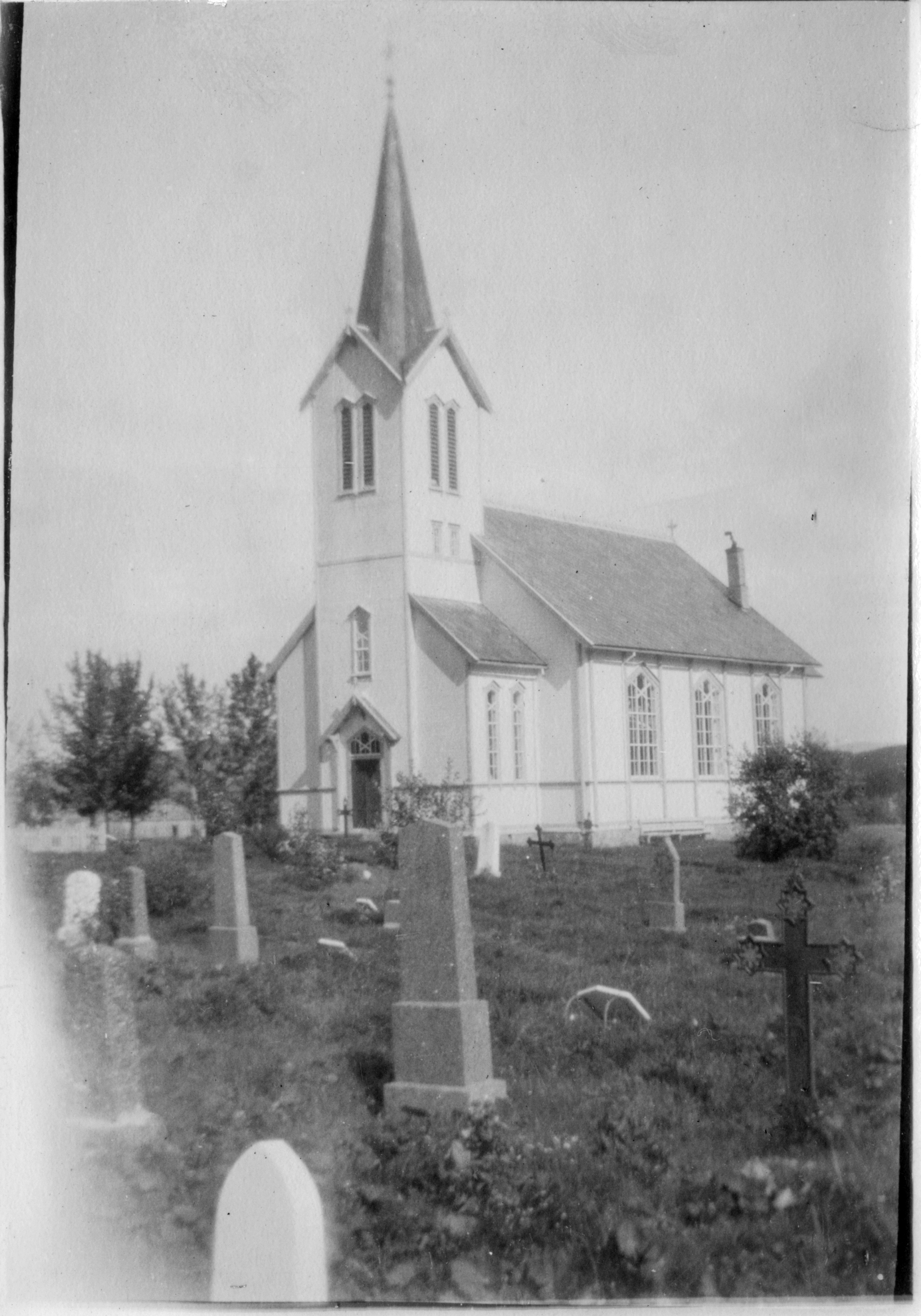
Front view (c. 1920s)

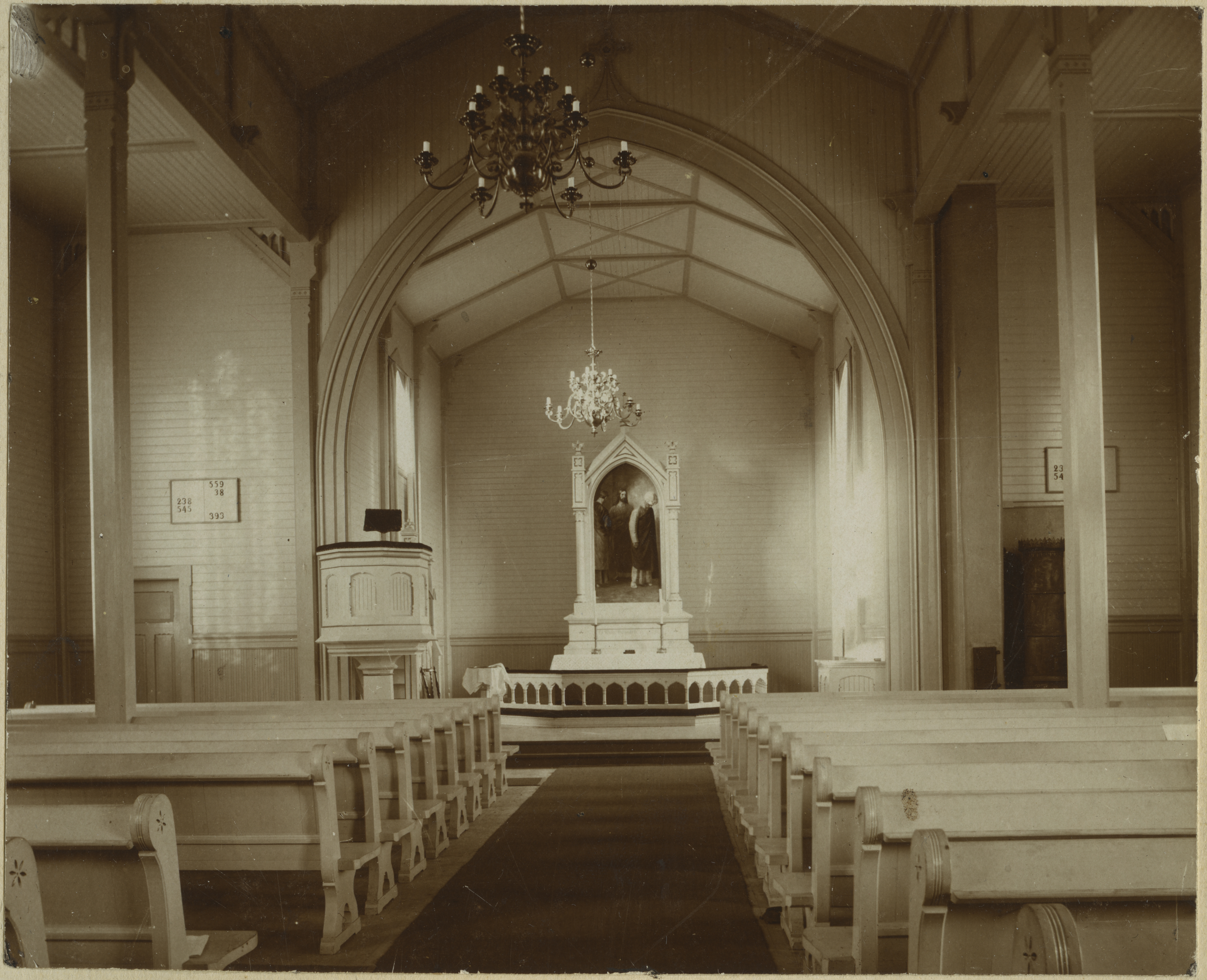
Interior view

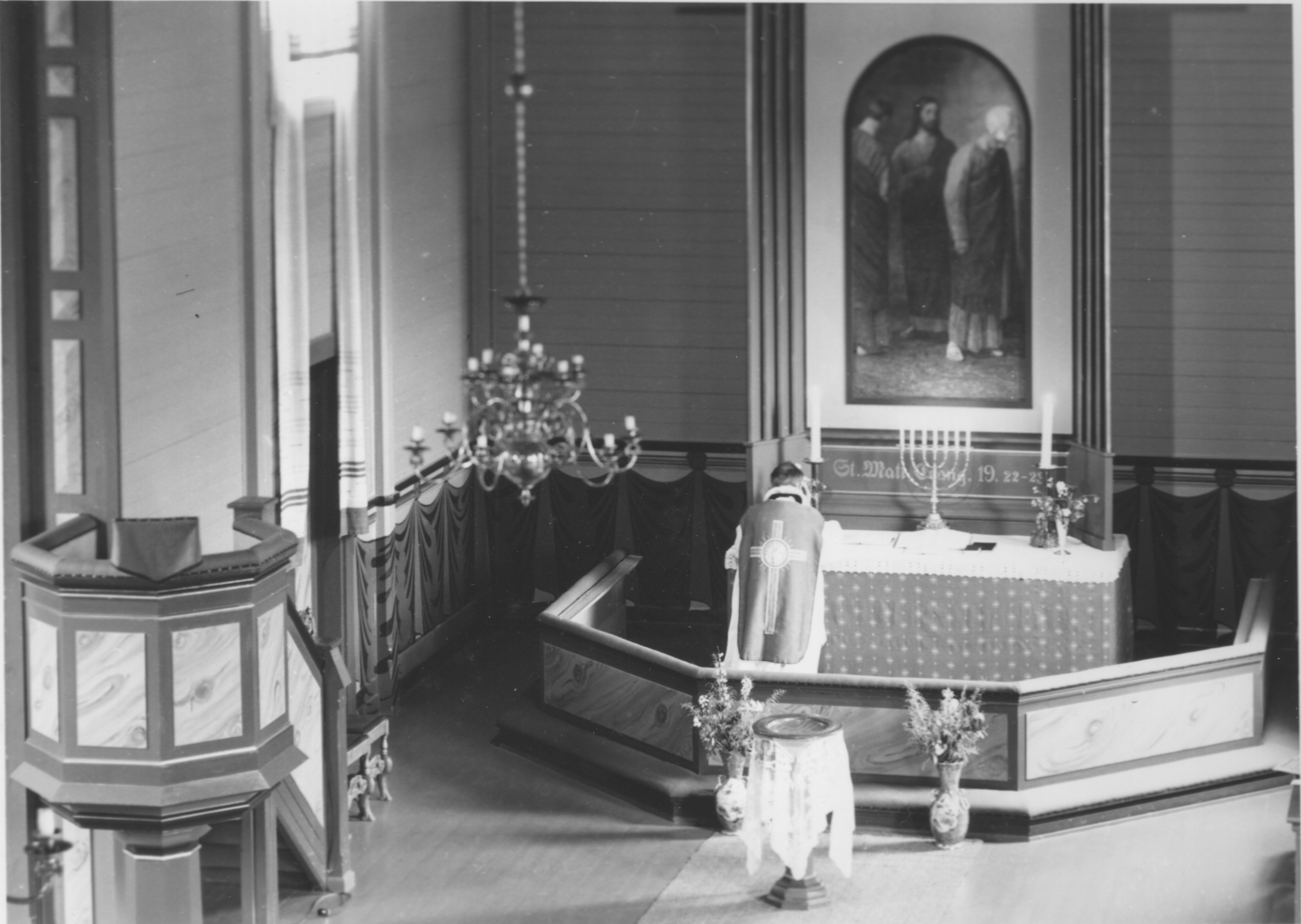
Interior, altar, and pulpit

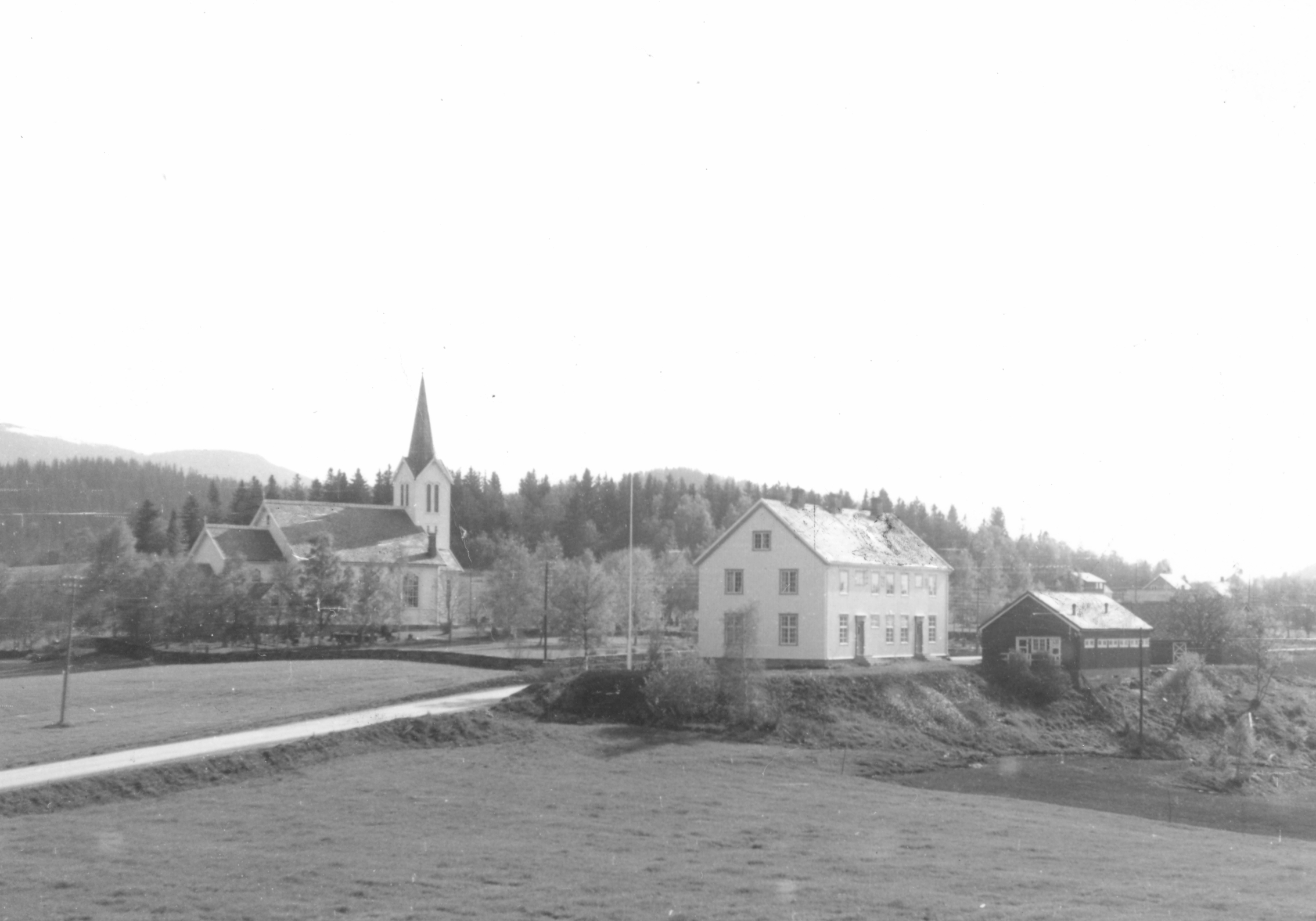
Church and surrounding area

== See also ==
- List of churches in Nidaros
