= Bertil Matérn =

Swedish statistician and mathematician (1917–2007)

- Born: May 18, 1917; Gothenburg, Sweden
- Died: November 6, 2007 (aged 90); Danderyd, Sweden
- Education: Stockholm University
- Known for: Matérn covariance function
- Spouse: Carin Berglund (m. 1947)
- Children: 2
- Scientific career
- Fields: Spatial statistics; Forestry statistics; Point processes
- Workplaces: Forestry Research Institute of Sweden; Swedish University of Agricultural Sciences
- Thesis: Spatial Variation: Stochastic models and their application to some problems in forest surveys and other sampling investigations (1960)
- Doctoral advisor: Harald Cramér

Bertil Matérn (18 May 1917 – 6 November 2007) was a Swedish statistician. The Matérn covariance function is named after him.

== Life and work ==
Bertil Matérn was born on 18 May 1917 in Gothenburg, Sweden, to Ernst Matérn, a pharmacist, and Hedvig Rhedin. He studied at Stockholm University, under the supervision of Harald Cramér. He was employed at the Forestry Research Institute of Sweden, where he worked on forestry statistics.

Matérn married Carin Berglund in 1947. They had two daughters, Barbro and Gunhild. Matérn died on 6 November 2007 in Danderyd.
