= Harald Cramér =

Swedish mathematician (1893–1985)

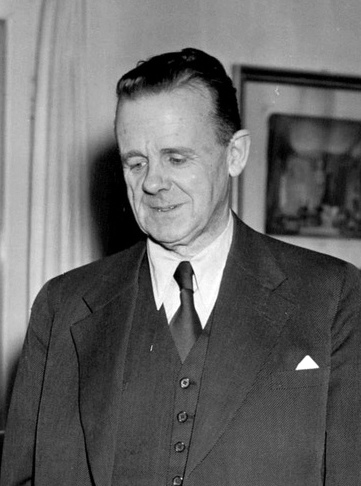
- Cramér in 1951
- Born: 25 September 1893; Stockholm, Sweden
- Died: 5 October 1985 (aged 92); Stockholm, Sweden
- Education: Stockholm University
- Known for: Cramér–Rao bound; Cramér's conjecture; Cramér’s decomposition theorem; Cramér's theorem (large deviations); Cramér–Wold theorem; Cramér–von Mises criterion; Cramér function of large deviations theory; Ruin theory; Cramér's V; Cramérs inequality
- Spouse: Marta Hansson
- Children: 3
- Awards: Guy Medal (Gold, 1972)
- Scientific career
- Fields: Statistics, Probability theory, Number theory
- Workplaces: Stockholm University
- Doctoral advisor: Marcel Riesz
- Doctoral students: Kai Lai Chung; Ulf Grenander; Leo Törnqvist; Herman Wold; Bertil Matérn

Harald Cramér (Swedish: [kraˈmeːr]; 25 September 1893 – 5 October 1985) was a Swedish mathematician, actuary, and statistician, specializing in mathematical statistics and probabilistic number theory. John Kingman described him as "one of the giants of statistical theory".

== Biography ==
=== Early life ===
Harald Cramér was born in Stockholm, Sweden on 25 September 1893. Cramér remained close to Stockholm for most of his life. He entered the Stockholm University as an undergraduate in 1912, where he studied mathematics and chemistry. During this period, he was a research assistant under the famous chemist, Hans von Euler-Chelpin, with whom he published his first five articles from 1913 to 1914. Following his lab experience, he began to focus solely on mathematics. He eventually began his work on his doctoral studies in mathematics which were supervised by Marcel Riesz at the Stockholm University. Also influenced by G. H. Hardy, Cramér's research led to a PhD in 1917 for his thesis "On a class of Dirichlet series".

=== Academic professional career ===
Following his PhD, he served as an Assistant Professor of Mathematics at Stockholm University from 1917 to 1929. Early on, Cramér was highly involved in analytic number theory. He also made some important statistical contributions to the distribution of primes and twin primes. His most famous paper on this subject is entitled "On the order of magnitude of the difference between consecutive prime numbers", which provided a rigorous account of the constructive role in which probability applied to number theory and included an estimate for prime gaps that became known as Cramér's conjecture.

In the late 1920s, Cramér became interested in the field of probability, which at the time was not an accepted branch of mathematics. Cramér knew that a radical change was needed in this field, and in a paper in 1926 said, "The probability concept should be introduced by a purely mathematical definition, from which its fundamental properties and the classical theorems are deduced by purely mathematical operations." Cramér took an interest in the rigorous mathematical formulation of probability in the work of French and Russian mathematicians such as Kolmogorov, Lévy, Bernstein, and Khinchin in the early 1930s. Cramér also made significant development to the revolution in probability theory. Cramér later wrote his careful study of the field in his Cambridge publication Random variables and probability distributions which appeared in 1937 (with a 2nd edition in 1962 and a 3rd edition in 1970). Shortly after World War II, Cramér went on to publish the influential Mathematical Methods of Statistics in 1946. This text was one that "showed the way in which statistical practice depended on a body of rigorous mathematical analysis as well as Fisherian intuition." His 1955 book Elements of Probability Theory and Some of its Applications introduces probability theory at a more elementary level than Mathematical Methods of Statistics.

In 1929, Cramér was appointed to a newly created chair in Stockholm University, becoming the first Swedish professor of Actuarial Mathematics and Mathematical Statistics. Cramér retained this position up until 1958. During his tenure at Stockholm University, Cramér was a PhD advisor for 10 students, most notably Herman Wold and Kai Lai Chung. In 1950 he was elected as a Fellow of the American Statistical Association. Starting in 1950, Cramér took on the additional responsibility of becoming the President of Stockholm University. In 1958, he was also appointed to be Chancellor of the entire Swedish university system. Cramér retired from the Swedish university system in 1961.

=== Actuarial career ===
A large portion of Cramér's work concerned the field of actuarial science and insurance mathematics. During the period from 1920 to 1929, he was an actuary for the life insurance company Svenska livförsäkringsbolaget. His actuarial work during this time led him to study probability and statistics which became the main area of his research. In 1927 he published an elementary text in Swedish Probability theory and some of its applications. Following his work for Svenska livförsäkringsbolaget, he went on to work for Återförsäkringsaktiebolaget Sverige, a reinsurance company, up until 1948. He was also known for his pioneering efforts in insurance risk theory. After this period, he remained as a consultant actuary to Sverige from 1949 to 1961. Later in his life, he was elected to be the Honorary President of the Swedish Actuarial Society.

=== Later years ===
Cramér remained an active contributor to his profession for an additional 20 years. Following his retirement in 1961, he became extremely active in research, which had been slowed due to his Chancellorship. From 1961 to 1983, Cramér traveled throughout the United States and Europe to continue his research, making significant stops at the University of California-Berkeley, Princeton University, and the Research Triangle Institute in North Carolina.

Cramér received an Honorary Doctorate from Heriot-Watt University in 1972.

His academic career spanned over seven decades, from 1913 to 1982.

== Personal life ==
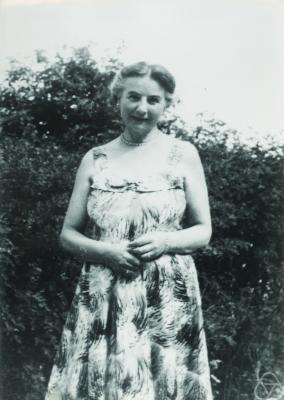
Marta Cramér

Harald Cramér married Marta Hansson in 1918, and they remained together up until her death in 1973. He had often referred to her as his "Beloved Marta". Together they had one daughter, Marie-Louise, and two sons, Tomas and Kim.
