= John Wold =

John Wold may refer to:

- John S. Wold (1916–2017), American business executive and politician from Wyoming
- John Johnsen Wold (1795–1889), Norwegian politician
