= Wold (surname) =

Wold is a surname. Notable people with the surname include:

- Bill Wold, American basketball player
- Eddie Wold (born 1951), American bridge player
- Edwin M. Wold (1900–1987), American businessman and politician
- Erling Wold (born 1958), American composer
- Herman Wold (1908–1992), Swedish statistician
- John Wold (disambiguation), multiple people
- Susse Wold (born 1938), Danish actress
- Terje Wold (1899–1972), Norwegian politician
