= Matérn covariance function =

Tool in multivariate statistical analysis

In statistics, the Matérn covariance, also called the Matérn kernel, is a covariance function used in spatial statistics, geostatistics, machine learning, image analysis, and other applications of multivariate statistical analysis on metric spaces. It is named after the Swedish forestry statistician Bertil Matérn. It specifies the covariance between two measurements as a function of the distance $d$ between the points at which they are taken. Since the covariance only depends on distances between points, it is stationary. If the distance is Euclidean distance, the Matérn covariance is also isotropic.

== Definition ==
The Matérn covariance between measurements taken at two points separated by d distance units is given by

$$C_\nu(d) = \sigma^2\frac{2^{1-\nu}}{\Gamma(\nu)}{\Bigg(\sqrt{2\nu}\frac{d}{\rho}\Bigg)}^\nu K_\nu\Bigg(\sqrt{2\nu}\frac{d}{\rho}\Bigg),$$

where $\Gamma$ is the gamma function, $K_\nu$ is the modified Bessel function of the second kind, and ρ and $\nu$ are positive parameters of the covariance.

A Gaussian process with Matérn covariance is $\lceil \nu \rceil-1$ times differentiable in the mean-square sense.

== Spectral density ==
The power spectrum of a process with Matérn covariance defined on $\mathbb{R}^n$ is the (n-dimensional) Fourier transform of the Matérn covariance function (see Wiener–Khinchin theorem). Explicitly, this is given by

$S(f)=\sigma^2\frac{2^n\pi^{n/2}\Gamma(\nu+\frac{n}2)(2\nu)^\nu}{\Gamma(\nu)\rho^{2\nu}}\left(\frac{2\nu}{\rho^2} + 4\pi^2f^2\right)^{-\left(\nu+\frac{n}2\right)}.$

== Simplification for specific values of ν ==
=== Simplification for ν half integer ===
When $\nu = p+1/2,\ p\in \mathbb{N}^+$ , the Matérn covariance can be written as a product of an exponential and a polynomial of degree $p$. The modified Bessel function of a fractional order is given by Equations 10.1.9 and 10.2.15 as

$$\sqrt{\frac{\pi}{2z}} K_{p+1/2}(z) = \frac{\pi}{2z}e^{-z}\sum_{k=0}^n \frac{(n+k)!}{k!\Gamma(n-k+1)} \left( 2z \right) ^{-k}.$$

This allows for the Matérn covariance of half-integer values of $\nu$ to be expressed as

$$C_{p+1/2}(d) = \sigma^2\exp\left(-\frac{\sqrt{2p+1}d}{\rho}\right)\frac{p!}{(2p)!}\sum_{i=0}^p\frac{(p+i)!}{i!(p-i)!}\left(\frac{2\sqrt{2p+1}d}{\rho}\right)^{p-i},$$

which gives:

- for $\nu = 1/2\ (p=0)$: $C_{1/2}(d) = \sigma^2\exp\left(-\frac{d}{\rho}\right),$
- for $\nu = 3/2\ (p=1)$: $C_{3/2}(d) = \sigma^2\left(1+\frac{\sqrt{3}d}{\rho}\right)\exp\left(-\frac{\sqrt{3}d}{\rho}\right),$
- for $\nu = 5/2\ (p=2)$: $C_{5/2}(d) = \sigma^2\left(1+\frac{\sqrt{5}d}{\rho}+\frac{5d^2}{3\rho^2}\right)\exp\left(-\frac{\sqrt{5}d}{\rho}\right).$

=== The Gaussian case in the limit of infinite ν ===
As $\nu\rightarrow\infty$, the Matérn covariance converges to the squared exponential covariance function

$$\lim_{\nu\rightarrow\infty}C_\nu(d) = \sigma^2\exp\left(-\frac{d^2}{2\rho^2}\right).$$

== Taylor series at zero and spectral moments ==
From the basic relation satisfied by the Gamma function $\Gamma(z)\Gamma(1-z)=\frac{\pi}{\sin(\pi z)}$ and the basic relation satisfied by the Modified Bessel Function of the second

$K_{\nu}(x) = \frac{\pi}{2} \frac{I_{-\nu}(x) - I_{\nu}(x)}{\sin (\pi\nu )}$

and the definition of the modified Bessel functions of the first $I_{\nu}(x)= \sum_{m=0}^\infty \frac{1}{m!\, \Gamma(m+\nu+1)}\left(\frac{x}{2}\right)^{2m+\nu},$

the behavior for $d\rightarrow0$ can be obtained by the following Taylor series (when $\nu$ is not an integer and bigger than 2):

$$C_\nu(d) = \sigma^2\left(1 + \frac{\nu}{2(1-\nu)}\left(\frac{d}{\rho}\right)^2 + \frac{\nu^2}{8(2-3\nu+\nu^2)}\left(\frac{d}{\rho}\right)^4  + \mathcal{O}\left(d^{6\wedge(2\nu)}\right)\right),\,\, \nu>2
.$$

When defined, the following spectral moments can be derived from the Taylor series:

$$\begin{align}
\lambda_0 & = C_\nu(0) = \sigma^2, \\[8pt]
\lambda_2 & = -\left.\frac{\partial^2C_\nu(d)}{\partial d^2}\right|_{d=0} = \frac{\sigma^2\nu}{\rho^2(\nu-1)}.
\end{align}$$

For the case of $\nu\in(0,1)\cup(1,2)$, similar Taylor series can be obtained:
$$C_\nu(d) = \sigma^2\left(1 + \frac{\nu}{2(1-\nu)}\left(\frac{d}{\rho}\right)^2 - \frac{\Gamma(1-\nu)}{ \Gamma(1+\nu)}\left(\frac{\nu}{2}\right)^{\nu} \left(\frac{d}{\rho}\right)^{2\nu}  + \mathcal{O}\left(d^{4\wedge(2\nu+2)}\right)\right),\,\, \nu\in (0,1)\cup(1,2)
.$$
When $\nu$ is an integer, limiting values should be taken (see).

== See also ==
- Radial basis function
