= Herman Wold =

Norwegian–Swedish statistician, economist (1908–1992)

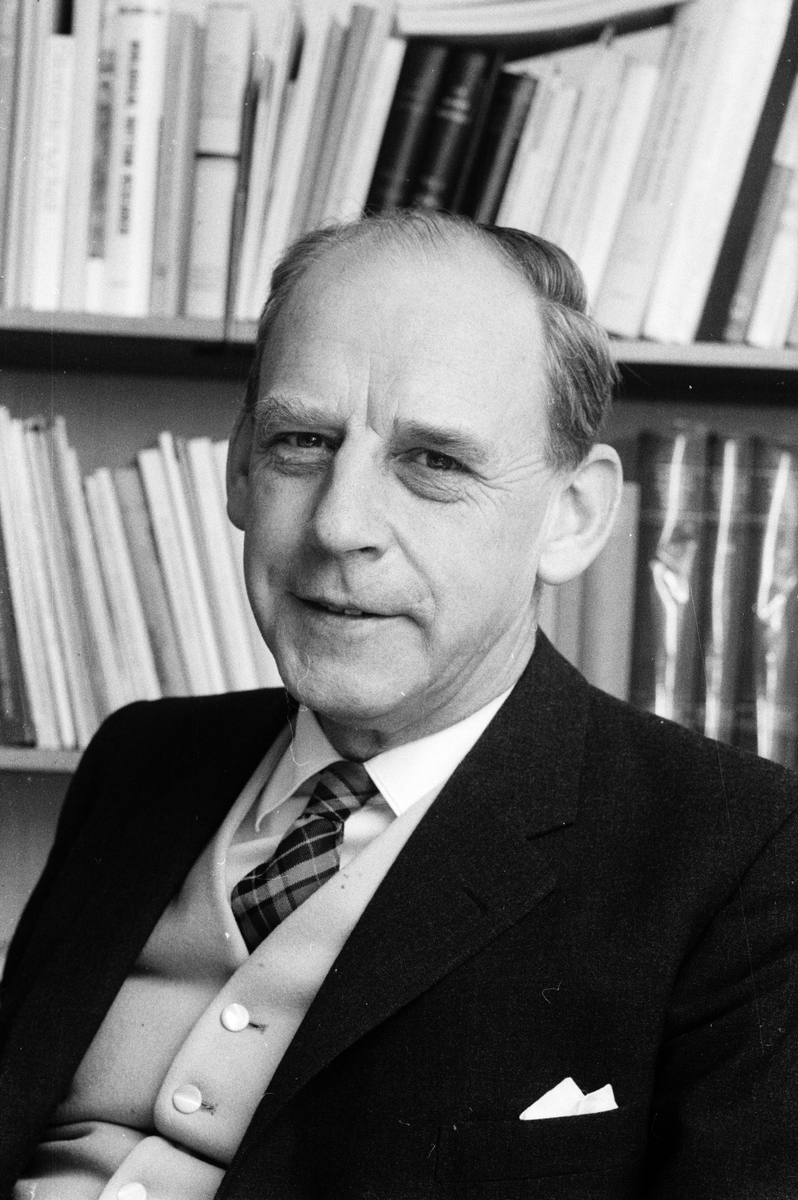
- Born: 25 December 1908; Skien, Norway
- Died: 16 February 1992 (aged 83)
- Education: Stockholm University
- Known for: Wold's theorem MA($\infty$) representation of stationary stochastic processes Wold decomposition (operator theory); Cramér–Wold theorem Time series analysis Utility theory Consumer demand Latent variable Structural equation models Consistent least squares estimation of recursive triangular systems Causal inference in observational studies Partial least squares regression
- Scientific career
- Fields: Statistics; Econometrics
- Workplaces: Uppsala University
- Doctoral advisor: Harald Cramér
- Doctoral students: Sten Malmquist; Peter Whittle; Karl Jöreskog; Antonio Martín Arroyo (Famous Lecturer)

Herman Ole Andreas Wold (25 December 1908 – 16 February 1992) was a Norwegian-born econometrician and statistician who had a long career in Sweden. Wold was known for his work in mathematical economics, in time series analysis, and in econometric statistics.

In mathematical statistics, Wold contributed the Cramér–Wold theorem characterizing the normal distribution and developed the Wold decomposition in time series analysis. In microeconomics, Wold advanced utility theory and the theory of consumer demand. In multivariate statistics, Wold contributed the methods of partial least squares (PLS) and graphical models. Wold's work on causal inference from observational studies was decades ahead of its time, according to Judea Pearl.

== Early life ==
Herman Wold was born in Skien, southern Norway. He was the youngest in a family of six brothers and sisters. In 1912 the family moved to Sweden and became Swedish citizens. Herman's father had a small fur and hide business.

== Scientific achievements ==
Herman Wold had a long and productive career, spanning six decades.

=== Studying with Harald Cramér ===
In 1927 Wold enrolled at the Stockholm University to study mathematics. It was an opportune time, for Harald Cramér had been appointed Professor of Actuarial Mathematics and Mathematical Statistics. Wold would later write, "To belong to Cramér's first group of students was good luck, an advantage that simply cannot be exaggerated."

After graduating in 1930 Wold worked for an insurance company; he also did work on mortality data with Cramér and later designed a tariff for the insurance companies. He started work on a PhD on stochastic processes with Cramér as supervisor. Away from the thesis Wold and Cramér did some joint work, their best known result being the Cramér–Wold theorem (1936).

=== Time series and the Wold decomposition ===
Wold's thesis, A Study in the analysis of stationary time series, was an important contribution. The main result was the "Wold decomposition" by which a stationary series is expressed as a sum of a deterministic component and a stochastic component which can itself be expressed as an infinite moving average. Beyond this, the work brought together for the first time the work on individual processes by English statisticians, principally Udny Yule, and the theory of stationary stochastic processes created by Russian mathematicians, principally A. Ya. Khinchin. Wold's results on univariate time series were generalized to multivariate time series by his student Peter Whittle.

The Wold decomposition and the related Wold's theorem inspired Beurling's factorization theorem in harmonic analysis and related work on invariant subspaces of linear operators.

=== Theory of consumer demand ===
In 1938 a government committee appointed Wold to do an econometric study of consumer demand in Sweden. The results were published in 1940. In parallel, he worked on the theory of demand. His book Demand Analysis (1952) brought together his work on the theory of demand, the theory of stochastic processes, the theory of regression and his work on Swedish data.

=== Systems of simultaneous equations and causal inference ===
In 1943 and 1944, Trygve Haavelmo put forward his ideas on the simultaneous equations model, arguing that systems of simultaneous equations should be central in econometric research. Wold noted some limitation of the maximum-likelihood approach favoured by Haavelmo and the Cowles Commission; Wold cautioned that the literature contained some exaggerated claims for the superiority of maximum-likelihood estimation.

In 1945 to 1965, Wold proposed and elaborated on his "recursive causal chain" model, which was more appropriate for many applications, according to Wold: For such "recursive causal chain" models, the least squares method was computationally efficient and enjoyed superior theoretical properties, which it lacked for general time-series models. Wold's writings on causality and recursive-chain models have been recognized as scientific inventions by recent work on causality and graphical models in statistics, especially by Judea Pearl and Nanny Wermuth.

=== Multivariate analysis and partial least squares ===
At the end of his career, Wold turned away from econometric modelling and developed multivariate techniques for what he called "soft" modelling. Some of these methods were developed through interactions with his student K. G. Jöreskog, although the latter's focus was primarily on maximum likelihood methods. His son Svante Wold applied these techniques in chemistry and developed the field of chemometrics.

== Appointments ==
The story of Wold's academic appointments is briefly told. In 1942 he became professor of statistics at Uppsala University and he stayed there until 1970. He then moved to Gothenburg, retiring from there in 1975.

In 1960 Wold became a member of the Royal Swedish Academy of Sciences. He was a member of the Prize Committee for the Sveriges Riksbank Prize in Economic Sciences in Memory of Alfred Nobel from 1968 to 1980.

== Selected writings by H. O. A. Wold ==
- 1938. A Study in the Analysis of Stationary Time Series, Almqvist & Wiksell
- 1949. Statistical Estimation of Economic Relationships, in Econometrica,
- 1952. Demand Analysis: A Study in Econometrics, with Lars Juréen.
- 1954. "Causality and Econometrics," Econometrica, 22(2), pp. 162–177.
- 1964.Econometric model building : essays on the causal chain approach (edited by Herman O.A. Wold).
- 1969. "Econometrics as Pioneering in Nonexperimental Model Building," Econometrica, 37(3), pp. 369–381.
- 1980. The Fix-Point Approach to Interdependent Systems (edited by Herman Wold), North-Holland.
- 1982. Systems under Indirect Observation: Causality, Structure, Prediction (edited by K. G. Jöreskog and H. Wold), North-Holland.

There is an extensive bibliography published with the ET interview (below).

== See also ==
- Causality
- Cramér, Harald
- Convex preferences
- Cramér–Wold theorem
- Demand (economics)
- Directed acyclic graph
- Econometrics
- Graphical model
- Jöreskog, Karl Gustav
- Latent variable
- Least squares
- Moving average
- Multivariate analysis
- Multivariate statistics
- Observational study
- Partial least squares regression
- Stationary process
- Structural equation model
- Time series
- Uppsala University
- Utility theory
- Whittle, Peter
- Wold decomposition
- Wold's theorem
