= Cramér–Wold theorem =

Mathematical theorem in measure theory

In mathematics, the Cramér–Wold theorem or the Cramér–Wold device is a theorem in measure theory and which states that a Borel probability measure on $\mathbb{R}^k$ is uniquely determined by the totality of its one-dimensional projections. It is used as a method for proving joint convergence results. The theorem is named after Harald Cramér and Herman Ole Andreas Wold, who published the result in 1936.

== Theorem ==
Let

$${X}_n = (X_{n1},\dots,X_{nk})$$

and

$$\; {X} = (X_1,\dots,X_k)$$

be random vectors of dimension k. Then ${X}_n$ converges in distribution to ${X}$ if and only if:

$$\sum_{i=1}^k t_iX_{ni} \overset{D}{\underset{n\rightarrow\infty}{\rightarrow}} \sum_{i=1}^k t_iX_i.$$

for each $(t_1,\dots,t_k)\in \mathbb{R}^k$, that is, if every fixed linear combination of the coordinates of ${X}_n$ converges in distribution to the correspondent linear combination of coordinates of ${X}$.

If ${X}_n$ takes values in $\mathbb{R}_+^k$, then the statement is also true with $(t_1,\dots,t_k)\in \mathbb{R}_+^k$.

=== Hyperspherical formulation ===
The hyperspherical version of the Cramér–Wold theorem can be stated in terms of projections onto the unit sphere. For $\mathbb{R}^d$-valued random vectors $X$ and $Y$,

$$\langle u, X \rangle \ \stackrel{d}{=}\ \langle u, Y \rangle \quad \text{for all } u \in S^{d-1} \quad \iff \quad X \ \stackrel{d}{=} \ Y,$$

where:

- $S^{d-1} = \{u \in \mathbb{R}^d : \|u\| = 1\}$ denotes the $(d-1)$-dimensional unit sphere in $\mathbb{R}^d$,
- $\langle u, X \rangle$ denotes the inner product of $u$ and $X$, and
- $\stackrel{d}{=}$ denotes equality in distribution.

Restricting $u$ to the unit sphere $S^{d-1}$ is sufficient because scaling $u$ by a non-zero scalar preserves equality in distribution of the projections.
