= John Johnsen Wold =

Norwegian politician

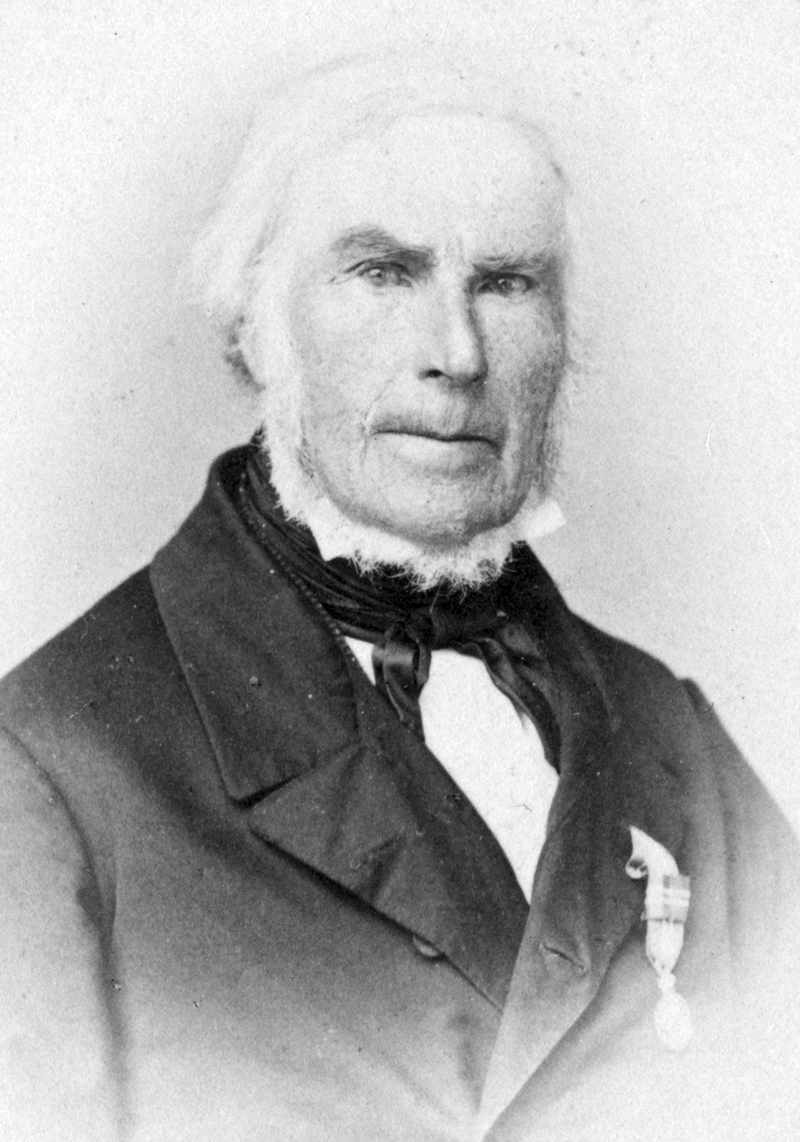
Portrait of John Johnsen Wold

John Johnsen Wold (12 March 1795 – 29 June 1889) was a Norwegian politician.

He was elected to the Norwegian Parliament in 1845, representing the constituency of Nordre Throndhjems Amt. He worked as a farmer there. He only served one term.
