= Forestry Research Institute of Sweden =

Swedish research institute

The Forestry Research Institute of Sweden (Swedish: Skogsbrukets forskningsinstitut), or Skogforsk, is a research institute headquartered in Uppsala, jointly financed by the members of the Swedish forestry industry and the Government. The institute's goal is providing high quality research back practices, forest management knowledge, products, and services, for improving productivity meanwhile reduce costs, also leads the industry to become more sustainable; It also plays a role to increase country's competitiveness in forestry management and help Sweden as a country to reach climate neutrality goal. The demand-driven applied research includes a wide variety of fields, such as forest technology, raw-material utilization, environmental impact and conservation, forest tree breeding, logistics, forest bioenergy and silviculture. The institute has budget of approximately SEK 150 M, employs 120 staffs with diversify backgrounds, of which about 80 are researchers.

Skogforsk has been developing 'Standard for Forest machine Data and Communication' (StanForD), a global standard for information communication among computers in forest machines. This system consists of a user interface, XML files management system which enables easy to extracting, reading and collecting data in a standard report. This report usually stores information regarding production reporting such as the harvested production with specifications of each harvested log, e.g., assortment, length, diameters, tree number, species, GPS-position, etc. The data also encompasses information concerning quality assurance and calibration.

Skogforsk also offers opportunity for institute doctoral education programme together with a number of universities in Sweden. It is usually funded by co-financing option with multiple government agencies, for example Vinnova, Energimyndigheten, Stiftelsens för Strategisk Forskning etc. The programme will take 5 years in total allows employee to participate research projects meanwhile take courses in post-graduate level.
