= Wold's decomposition =

In mathematics, particularly in operator theory, Wold decomposition or Wold–von Neumann decomposition, named after Herman Wold and John von Neumann, is a classification theorem for isometric linear operators on a given Hilbert space. It states that every isometry is a direct sum of copies of the unilateral shift and a unitary operator.

In time series analysis, the theorem implies that every stationary discrete-time stochastic process can be decomposed into a pair of uncorrelated processes, one deterministic, and the other being a moving average process.

== Details ==
Let H be a Hilbert space, L(H) be the bounded operators on H, and V ∈ L(H) be an isometry. The Wold decomposition states that every isometry V takes the form

$$V = \left(\bigoplus_{\alpha \in A} S\right) \oplus U$$

for some index set A, where S is the unilateral shift on a Hilbert space H_{α}, and U is a unitary operator (possible vacuous). The family {H_{α}} consists of isomorphic Hilbert spaces.

A proof can be sketched as follows. Successive applications of V give a descending sequences of copies of H isomorphically embedded in itself:

$$H = H \supset V(H) \supset V^2 (H) \supset \cdots = H_0 \supset H_1 \supset H_2 \supset \cdots,$$

where V(H) denotes the range of V. The above defined H_{i} = V^{i}(H). If one defines

$$M_i = H_i \ominus H_{i+1} = V^i (H \ominus V(H)) \quad \text{for} \quad i \geq 0 \;,$$

then

$$H = \left( \bigoplus_{i \geq 0} M_i \right) \oplus \left( \bigcap_{i \geq 0} H_i \right) = K_1 \oplus K_2.$$

It is clear that K_{1} and K_{2} are invariant subspaces of V.

So V(K_{2}) = K_{2}. In other words, V restricted to K_{2} is a surjective isometry, i.e., a unitary operator U.

Furthermore, each M_{i} is isomorphic to another, with V being an isomorphism between M_{i} and M_{i+1}: V "shifts" M_{i} to M_{i+1}. Suppose the dimension of each M_{i} is some cardinal number α. We see that K_{1} can be written as a direct sum Hilbert spaces

$$K_1 = \oplus H_{\alpha}$$

where each H_{α} is an invariant subspaces of V and V restricted to each H_{α} is the unilateral shift S. Therefore

$$V = V \vert_{K_1} \oplus V\vert_{K_2} = \left(\bigoplus_{\alpha \in A} S \right) \oplus U,$$

which is a Wold decomposition of V.

=== Remarks ===
It is immediate from the Wold decomposition that the spectrum of any proper, i.e. non-unitary, isometry is the unit disk in the complex plane.

An isometry V is said to be pure if, in the notation of the above proof, $\bigcap_{i\ge0} H_i = \{0\}.$ The multiplicity of a pure isometry V is the dimension of the kernel of V*, i.e. the cardinality of the index set A in the Wold decomposition of V. In other words, a pure isometry of multiplicity N takes the form

$$V = \bigoplus_{1 \le \alpha \le N} S .$$

In this terminology, the Wold decomposition expresses an isometry as a direct sum of a pure isometry and a unitary operator.

A subspace M is called a wandering subspace of V if V^{n}(M) ⊥ V^{m}(M) for all n ≠ m. In particular, each M_{i} defined above is a wandering subspace of V.

== A sequence of isometries ==
The decomposition above can be generalized slightly to a sequence of isometries, indexed by the integers.

== The C*-algebra generated by an isometry ==
Consider an isometry V ∈ L(H). Denote by C*(V) the C*-algebra generated by V, i.e. C*(V) is the norm closure of polynomials in V and V*. The Wold decomposition can be applied to characterize C*(V).

Let C(T) be the continuous functions on the unit circle T. We recall that the C*-algebra C*(S) generated by the unilateral shift S takes the following form

C*(S) = {T_{f} + K | T_{f} is a Toeplitz operator with continuous symbol f ∈ C(T) and K is a compact operator}.

In this identification, S = T_{z} where z is the identity function in C(T). The algebra C*(S) is called the Toeplitz algebra.

Theorem (Coburn) C*(V) is isomorphic to the Toeplitz algebra and V is the isomorphic image of T_{z}.

The proof hinges on the connections with C(T), in the description of the Toeplitz algebra and that the spectrum of a unitary operator is contained in the circle T.

The following properties of the Toeplitz algebra will be needed:

1. $T_f + T_g = T_{f+g}.\,$
2. $T_f ^* = T_{{\bar f}} .$
3. The semicommutator $T_fT_g - T_{fg} \,$ is compact.

The Wold decomposition says that V is the direct sum of copies of T_{z} and then some unitary U:

$$V = \left( \bigoplus_{\alpha \in A} T_z \right) \oplus U.$$

So we invoke the continuous functional calculus f → f(U), and define

$$\Phi : C^*(S) \rightarrow C^*(V) \quad \text{by} \quad \Phi(T_f + K) = \bigoplus_{\alpha \in A} (T_f + K) \oplus f(U).$$

One can now verify Φ is an isomorphism that maps the unilateral shift to V:

By property 1 above, Φ is linear. The map Φ is injective because T_{f} is not compact for any non-zero f ∈ C(T) and thus T_{f} + K = 0 implies f = 0. Since the range of Φ is a C*-algebra, Φ is surjective by the minimality of C*(V). Property 2 and the continuous functional calculus ensure that Φ preserves the *-operation. Finally, the semicommutator property shows that Φ is multiplicative. Therefore the theorem holds.
