= Wold's theorem =

Theorem of stationary processes

In statistics, Wold's decomposition or the Wold representation theorem (not to be confused with the Wold theorem that is the discrete-time analog of the Wiener–Khinchin theorem), named after Herman Wold, says that every covariance-stationary time series $Y_{t}$ can be written as the sum of two time series, one deterministic and one stochastic.

Formally

$$Y_t=\sum_{j=0}^\infty b_j \varepsilon_{t-j}+\eta_t,$$

where:

- $Y_t$ is the time series being considered,

- $\varepsilon_t$ is an uncorrelated sequence which is the innovation process to the process $Y_t$ – that is, a white noise process that is input to the linear filter $\{b_j \}$.

- $b$ is the possibly infinite vector of moving average weights (coefficients or parameters)

- $\eta_t$ is a "deterministic" time series, in the sense that it is completely determined as a linear combination of its past values (see e.g. Anderson (1971) Ch. 7, Section 7.6.3. pp. 420-421). It may include "deterministic terms" like sine/cosine waves of $t$, but it is a stochastic process and it is also covariance-stationary, it cannot be an arbitrary deterministic process that violates stationarity.

The moving average coefficients have these properties:

1. Stable, that is, square summable $\sum_{j=1}^\infty|b_j|^2$ < $\infty$
2. Causal (i.e. there are no terms with j < 0)
3. Minimum phase
4. Constant ($b_j$ independent of t)
5. It is conventional to define $b_0 = 1$

This theorem can be considered as an existence theorem: any stationary process has this seemingly special representation. Not only is the existence of such a simple linear and exact representation remarkable, but even more so is the special nature of the moving average model. Imagine creating a process that is a moving average but not satisfying these properties 1–4. For example, the coefficients $b_j$ could define an acausal and non-minimum phase model. Nevertheless the theorem assures the existence of a causal minimum-phase moving average that exactly represents this process. How this all works for the case of causality and the minimum delay property is discussed in Scargle (1981), where an extension of the Wold decomposition is discussed.

The usefulness of the Wold Theorem is that it allows the dynamic evolution of a variable $Y_{t}$ to be approximated by a linear model. If the innovations $\varepsilon_t$ are independent, then the linear model is the only possible representation relating the observed value of $Y_t$ to its past evolution. However, when $\varepsilon_t$ is merely an uncorrelated but not independent sequence, then the linear model exists but it is not the only representation of the dynamic dependence of the series. In this latter case, it is possible that the linear model may not be very useful, and there would be a nonlinear model relating the observed value of $Y_{t}$ to its past evolution. However, in practical time series analysis, it is often the case that only linear predictors are considered, partly on the grounds of simplicity, in which case the Wold decomposition is directly relevant.

The Wold representation depends on an infinite number of parameters, although in practice they usually decay rapidly. The autoregressive model is an alternative that may have only a few coefficients if the corresponding moving average has many. These two models can be combined into an autoregressive-moving average (ARMA) model, or an autoregressive-integrated-moving average (ARIMA) model if non-stationarity is involved. See Scargle (1981) and references there; in addition this paper gives an extension of the Wold Theorem that allows more generality for the moving average (not necessarily stable, causal, or minimum delay) accompanied by a sharper characterization of the innovation (identically and independently distributed, not just uncorrelated). This extension allows the possibility of models that are more faithful to physical or astrophysical processes, and in particular can sense ″the arrow of time.″
