= 2013 in Norway =

- Centuries: 19th; 20th; 21st
- Decades: 1990s; 2000s; 2010s; 2020s
- See also: List of years in Norway

Events in the year 2013 in Norway.

== Incumbents ==
- Monarch – Harald V.
- President of the Storting – Dag Terje Andersen (Labour) until 9 October, then Olemic Thommessen (Conservative) from 16 October
- Prime Minister – Jens Stoltenberg (Labour until 16 October, then Erna Solberg (Conservative from 16 October

== Events ==
=== January–March ===
- 16–19 January – Five Norwegians died in the In Amenas hostage crisis.
- 17 January – A lorry full of highly-flammable goat-whey cheese, brunost, caught fire in a road tunnel near Kjøpsvik in Tysfjord Municipality. The high fat and sugar content kept the conflagration burning for four days and the tunnel was impassable and badly damaged.
- 19 February – The Standing Committee on Scrutiny and Constitutional Affairs unanimously criticised Stoltenberg's Cabinet for lack of security arrangement before the 2011 Norway attacks.

=== April–June ===
- 6 May – Gerd Kristiansen was elected leader of the Norwegian Confederation of Trade Unions
- 28 May – Oslo city council decided to build a new Munch Museum in Bjørvika.

=== July–September ===
- 1 July – It was announced that the Södra Cell Tofte pulp mill will close.
- 17 July – Marte Dalelv was convicted for extramarital sex and perjury after having reported a man to the police in Dubai for rape. She was later pardoned.
- 5 August – A female employee at the Labour and Welfare Service in Oslo was stabbed at work and died five days later.
- 17 August – The Hardanger Bridge was opened.
- 9 September – In the 2013 Norwegian parliamentary election the non-socialist parties won a plurality. The Green Party gained a representative in parliament for the first time.
- 9 September – Fifty-five percent of voters in Oslo voted in favour of the Oslo bid for the 2022 Winter Olympics.
- 30 September – After negotiations, the Conservative Party and the Progress Party agreed to form a new cabinet while the Liberal Party and Christian Democratic Party agreed to support the cabinet in Parliament.

=== October–December ===
- 7 October – The Conservative and Progress parties presented a political platform for Solberg's Cabinet.
- 9 October – Olemic Thommessen formally becomes the new President of the Storting.
- 16 October – Erna Solberg became as prime minister at her cabinet; the Progress party were represented in government for the first time following the 2013 parliamentary elections and Stoltenberg's lost the election.
- 23 October – The Supreme Court ruled that a time limit of 25 years for individual fishing quotas does not violate the Constitution of Norway.
- 4 November – Three people died in a hijacking of the Valdresekspressen bus service.
- 16 November – Cyclone Hilde struck Trøndelag and Helgeland.
- 3 December – PISA 2012 showed Norwegian pupils scoring below average in mathematics, and generally worse than in 2009.
- 5 December – Seven pioneer divers in the North sea won a case against Norway in the European Court of Human Rights for financial compensation for injuries.
- 10 December – The Organisation for the Prohibition of Chemical Weapons was awarded the 2013 Nobel Peace Prize in Oslo.
- 10 December – Joshua French was indicted for the murder of Tjostolv Moland.
- 12 December – Hurricane Ivar struck Central Norway; 53,000 households lost electricity.
- 24 December – A storm struck many areas of the country on Christmas Eve.

== Sports and popular culture ==
=== Sports ===
- 1 April: Magnus Carlsen won the 2013 Candidate tournament in Chess and became the challenger to Viswanathan Anand in the World Chess Championship in November 2013.
- 11 August – 2 September – The Chess World Cup 2013 was hosted in Tromsø.
- 4–9 November – the 2013 Equipped Powerlifting World Championships are held in Stavanger.
- 9–22 November – Carlsen won the 2013 World Chess Championship match 6½–3½ against Anand, thus becoming the new world chess champion.

=== Music ===
- Norway in the Eurovision Song Contest 2013
- 13 August – Erlend Skomsvoll was recipient of the Ella-prisen 2013 at the Oslo Jazzfestival.
- "The Fox (What Does the Fox Say?)", an electronic dance song and viral video by the comedy duo Ylvis, was the top trending video of 2013 on YouTube.
- 9 October – Ylvis performs their viral hit "The Fox (What Does the Fox Say?)" on Late Night with Jimmy Fallon.

=== Television ===
- 10 May - Siri Vølstad Jensen wins the seventh series of Idol.
- 23 November - Singer and runner up of the seventh series of Idol Eirik Søfteland and his partner Nadya Khamitskaya win the ninth series of Skal vi danse?.
- 13 December - Knut Marius wins the second season of The Voice – Norges beste stemme.

== Anniversaries ==
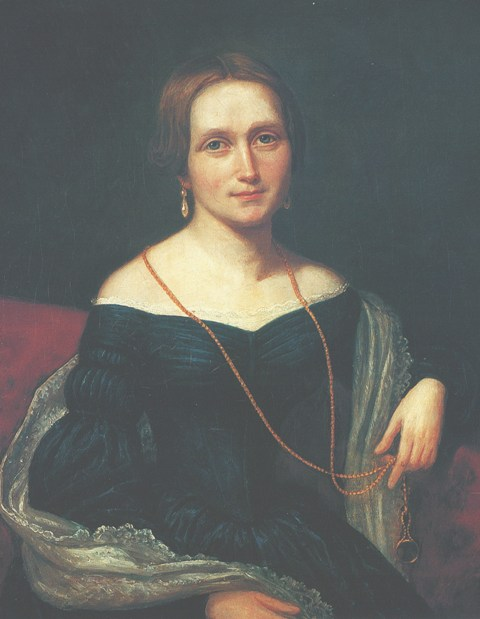
200 years since the birth of Camilla Collett

- 23 January – 200 years since the birth of Camilla Collett
- 11 June – 100 years since general suffrage for women in Norway
- 5 August – 200 years since the birth of Ivar Aasen
- 12 December – 150 years since the birth of Edvard Munch.

== Notable deaths ==
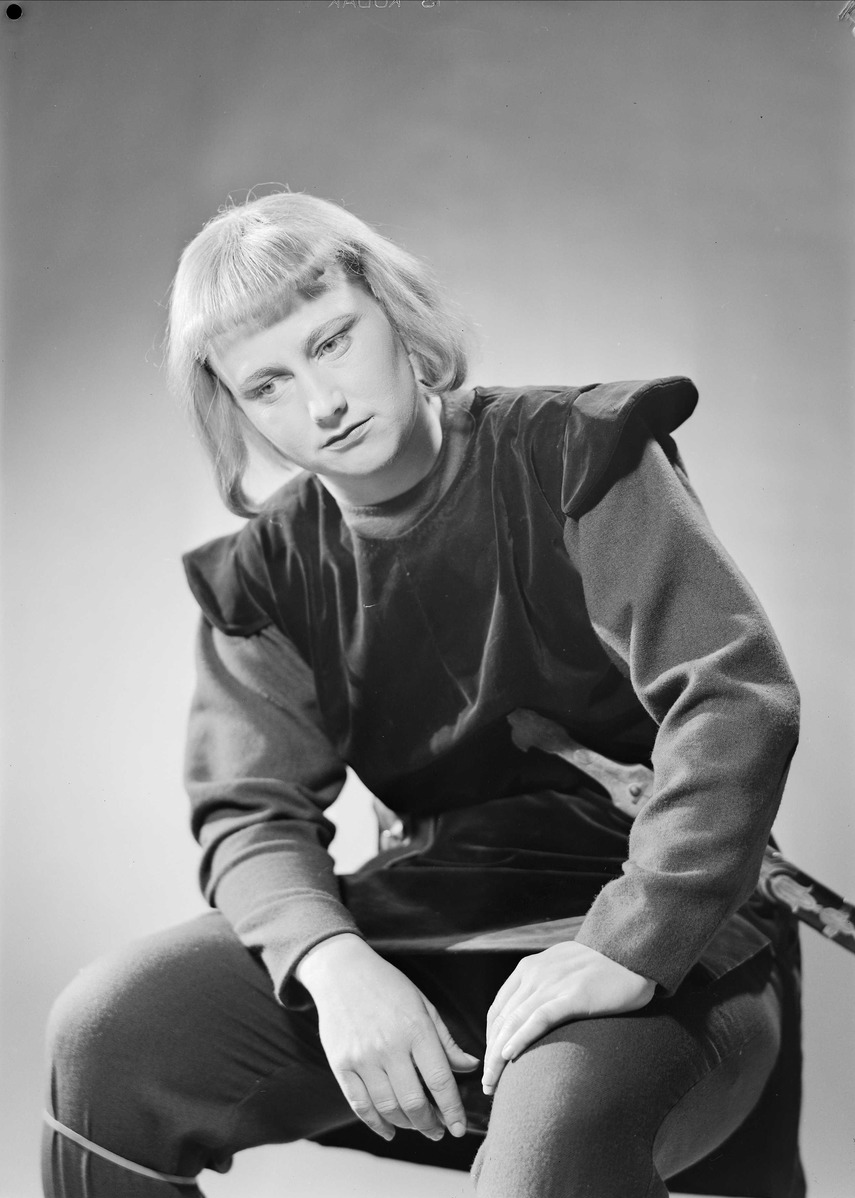
Aase Nordmo Løvberg

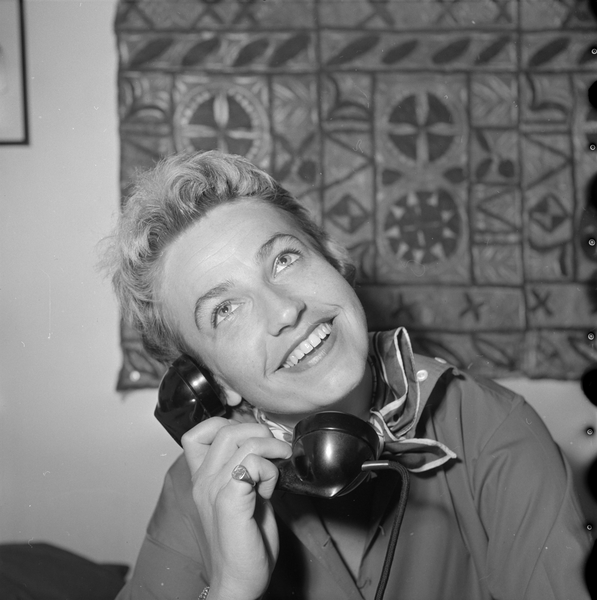
Kirsten Sørlie

- 2 January – Dag Lyseid, footballer and politician (b. 1954)
- 3 January – Preben Munthe, economist (b. 1922)
- 3 January – Lars T. Bjella, politician (b. 1922)
- 4 January – Petter Fauchald, footballer (b. 1930)
- 4 January – Nilmar Janbu, engineer (b. 1921)
- 5 January – Trygve Goa, printmaker (b. 1925)
- 7 January – Helge B. Andresen, businessperson (b. 1935)
- 7 January – Birck Elgaaen, equestrian (b. 1917)
- 8 January – Asbjørn Aarnes, literary historian (b. 1923)
- 8 January – Ole A. Sæther, entomologist (b. 1936)
- 14 January – Morten Mølster, guitarist (b. 1962)
- 18 January – Borghild Niskin, alpine skier (b. 1924)
- 18 January – Svein Magnus Håvarstein, sculptor (b. 1942)
- 19 January – Viggo Hagstrøm, legal scholar (b. 1954)
- 25 January – Aase Nordmo Løvberg, opera singer (b. 1923)
- 25 January – Arne Berg, ice hockey player (b. 1931)
- 26 January – Egon Weng, dancer and ballet coach (b. 1924)
- 28 January – John Tandrevold, boxer (b. 1927)
- 1 February – Dag Schjelderup-Ebbe, musicologist (b. 1926)
- 2 February – Tarjei Rygnestad, physician (b. 1954)
- 3 February – Reidar Hugsted, engineer (b. 1931)
- 3 February – Kåre Syrstad, agrarian leader (b. 1939)
- 5 February – Egil Hovland, composer (b. 1924)
- 7 February – Nic Knudtzon, engineer (b. 1922)
- 7 February – Per Tomter, mathematician (b. 1939)
- 8 February – Knut Nesbø, musician, footballer and journalist (b. 1961)
- 9 February – Kåre Valebrokk, media executive (b. 1940)
- 11 February – Tore Hansen, singer (b. 1949)
- 11 February – Villy Andresen, footballer (b. 1925)
- 12 February – Bård Henriksen, speed skater (b. 1945)
- 13 February – Per Blom, film director (b. 1946)
- 16 February – Jan Dahm, resistance member (b. 1921)
- 19 February – Eva Bergh, actress (b. 1926)
- 20 February – Oddbjørn Hågård, politician (b. 1940)
- 1 March – Margaret Johansen, novelist (b. 1923)
- 2 March – Niels Hertzberg, sports official (b. )
- 2 March – Bjørn Skau, politician (b. 1929)
- 11 March – Harald Peterssen, painter (b. 1916)
- 16 March – Trond Brænne, actor (b. 1953)
- 16 March – Georg Rajka, dermatologist (born 1925)
- 17 March – Svein Blindheim, military officer (b. 1916)
- 18 March – Eivind Rølles, guitarist (b. 1959)
- 19 March – Eyvind Fjeld Halvorsen, philologist (b. 1922)
- 23 March – Aloysius Valente, dancer (b. 1926)
- 24 March – Inge Lønning, theologian and politician (b. 1938)
- 24 March – Jo Inge Bjørnebye, ski jumper (b. 1946)
- 25 March – Ellen Einan, poet (b. 1931)
- 27 March – Hjalmar Andersen, speed skater (b. 1923)
- 1 April – Eskild Jensen, civil servant (b. 1925)
- 2 April – Johnny Lunde, alpine skier (b. 1923)
- 3 April – Jul Haganæs, poet (b. 1932)
- 3 April – Kiki Byrne, fashion designer (b. 1937, died in the UK)
- 13 April – Hilmar Myhra, ski jumper (b. 1915)
- 17 April – Yngve Moe, musician (b. 1957)
- 18 April – Jon Åker, hospital director (b. 1927)
- 21 April – Bjarne Sandemose, inventor (b. 1924)
- 21 April – Sigurd G. Helle, topographer (b. 1920)
- 21 April – Ludvig Johan Bakkevig, missionary (b. 1921)
- 23 April – Tor Traheim, ship-owner (b. 1925)
- 25 April – Tor Waaler, pharmacologist (b. 1927)
- 28 April – Carl M. Rynning-Tønnesen, police chief (b. 1924)
- 29 April – Erling Løseth, politician (b. 1927)
- 29 April – Ole K. Sara, politician (b. 1936)
- 29 April – Gunvor Stornes, writer (b. 1924)
- 3 May – Thor Andreassen, trade unionist (b. 1927)
- 4 May – Annok Sarri Nordrå, writer (b. 1931)
- 5 May – Leif Preus, photographer (b. 1928)
- 5 May – Arne Ratchje, aquaculturist (b. 1916)
- 5 May – Tore Magnussen, boxer (b. 1938)
- 10 May – Per Maurseth, historian (b. 1932)
- 10 May – Jan H. Jensen, pulp writer (b. 1944, died in the Philippines)
- 12 May – Olaf B. Bjørnstad, ski jumper (b. 1931)
- 12 May – Helga Syrrist, politician and activist (b. 1921)
- 16 May – Kristen Kyrre Bremer, bishop (b. 1925)
- 17 May – Otto Julius Rosenkrantz Kloumann, officer and physician (b. 1916)
- 18 May – Jo Benkow, politician (b. 1924)
- 19 May – Anders Vangen, opera singer (b. 1960)
- 25 May – Jan Kinder, ice hockey player (b. 1944)
- 25 May – Erling Welle-Strand, resistance member (b. 1916)
- 1 June – Atle Kittang, literary historian (b. 1941)
- 1 June – Arnvid Førde, politician (b. 1919)
- 2 June – Sverre Magelssen, YMCA leader (b. 1918)
- 8 June – Per Edvard Danielsen, naval officer (b. 1918)
- 9 June – Leif Karl Lundesgaard, military officer (b. 1922)
- 13 June – Olav Sigurd Carlsen, politician (b. 1930)
- 16 June – Tore O. Vorren, geologist (b. 1944)
- 20 June – Per Ung, sculptor (b. 1933)
- 29 June – Jørgen Sønstebø, politician (b. 1922)
- 1 July – Rolf Nordhagen, physicist (b. 1927)
- 1 July – Rolf Graf, musician (b. 1960)
- 5 July – Tor Holtan-Hartwig, politician (b. 1927)
- 7 July – Ingebjørg Wærstad, politician (b. 1926)
- 9 July – Johannes Østtveit, politician (b. 1927)
- 13 July – Mona Røkke, politician (b. 1940)
- 15 July – Terje Mørkved, footballer and speed skater (b. 1949)
- 15 July – Doris Jørns, writer (b. 1915)
- 16 July – Torbjørn Falkanger, ski jumper (b. 1927)
- 18 July – Ivar P. Enge, radiologist (b. 1922)
- 18 July – Kåre Lunden, historian (b. 1930)
- 18 July – Mary Eide, politician (b. 1940)
- 19 July – Niclas Gulbrandsen, artist (b. 1930)
- 24 July – Arne Eriksen, footballer (b. 1918)
- 29 July – Ole Henrik Moe, museum director (b. 1920)
- 1 August – Arild Borgen, novelist (b. 1932).
- 2 August – Ola Enstad, sculptor (b. 1942)
- 6 August – Flora McDonald Hartveit, professor of medicine (b. 1931)
- 9 August – Kristian Smidt, literary historian (b. 1916)
- 13 August – Terje Ekstrøm, furniture designer (b. 1944)
- 17 August – Kjell Lund, architect (b. 1927)
- 17 August – Alf Magne Austad, painter (b. 1946)
- 18 August – Tjostolv Moland, mercenary (b. 1981, died in DR Congo)
- 18 August – Rolv Wesenlund, comedian (b. 1936)
- 21 August – Olav Hagen, cross-country skier (b. 1921)
- 23 August – Kåre Kvilhaug, architect (b. 1925)
- 24 August – Alf Kaartvedt, historian (b. 1921)
- 27 August – Lucy Smith, law professor (b. 1934)
- 27 August – Magnhild Holmberg, politician (b. 1943)
- 29 August – Are Vesterlid, architect (b. 1921)
- 29 August – Trond Kristoffersen, businessperson (b. 1956)
- 30 August – Oddvar Vormeland, educationalist (b. 1924)
- 4 September – Inge Paulsen, footballer (b. 1923)
- 8 September – Tore Sinding-Larsen, judge (b. 1929)
- 9 September – Gunnar Høst Sjøwall, tennis player (b. 1929)
- 14 September – Amund Venger, politician (b. 1943)
- 16 September – Odd Nordhaug, sociologist (b. 1953)
- 17 September – Alex Naumik, rock and pop singer (b. 1949)
- 18 September – Torleiv Anda, diplomat (b. 1921)
- 19 September – Sven Josef Cyvin, chemist (b. 1931)
- 19 September – Øystein Fischer, physicist (b. 1942)
- 21 September – Albert Assev, family therapist (b. 1922)
- 22 September – Hassan Abdi Dhuhulow, terrorist (b. 1990)
- 23 September – Eivinn Berg, diplomat (b. 1931)
- 23 September – Kirsten Sørlie, theatre instructor (b. 1926)
- 24 September – Sverre Bruland, conductor (b. 1923)
- 24 September – Frank Stubb Micaelsen, poet and novelist (b. 1947).
- 25 September – Hans Guttorm, politician (b. 1927)
- 26 September – Arnstein Johansen, accordionist (b. 1925)
- 26 September – Helge Solvang, politician (b. 1913)
- 1 October – Ole Danbolt Mjøs, physician and politician (b. 1939)
- 1 October – Bjørn Randby, handballer and businessperson (b. 1931)
- 2 October – Kaare Ørnung, pianist (b. 1931)
- 11 October – Rolf Wembstad, footballer (b. 1927)
- 11 October – Olaf Heitkøtter, nature writer (b. 1928)
- 12 October – Hans Wilhelm Longva, diplomat (b. 1942)
- 18 October – Ola Syrstad, agriculturalist (b. 1922)
- 19 October – Lage Fosheim, musician (b. 1958)
- 21 October – Karen Sogn, politician (b. 1931)
- 22 October – Jo Filseth, businessperson (b. 1937)
- 23 October – Bjørn Christoffersen, rower (b. 1926)
- 25 October – Dan Laksov, mathematician (b. 1940)
- 25 October – Arne Johansen, speed skater (b. 1927)
- 28 October – Trygve Kornelius Fjetland, businessperson (b. 1926)
- 2 November – Målfrid Grude Flekkøy, Children Ombudsman (b. 1936)
- 2 November – Brita Borge, politician (b. 1931)
- 4 November – Håkon Barfod, yacht racer (b. 1926)
- 4 November – Astri Jacobsen, actress (b. 1922)
- 6 November – Arvid Johanson, politician (b. 1929)
- 7 November – Gunnar Hjeltnes, alpine skier (b. 1922)
- 9 November – Helen Aareskjold, blind people's activist (b. 1938)
- 9 November – Grethe Rytter Hasle, planktologist (b. 1920)
- 9 November – Per Olsen, cross-country skier (b. 1932)
- 11 November – Stein Grieg Halvorsen, actor (b. 1909)
- 12 November – Erik Augestad, handballer (b. 1951)
- 12 November – Tore Lindseth, footballer (b. 1948)
- 16 November – Arne Pedersen, footballer (b. 1931)
- 16 November – Erik Loe, editor (b. 1920)
- 16 November – Tor Schaug-Pettersen, physicist (b. 1928)
- 18 November – Knut Tøraasen, diplomat (b. 1938)
- 18 November – Edgar Falch, footballer (b. 1930)
- 21 November – Fred Kavli, entrepreneur (b. 1927, died in the US)
- 23 November – Solveig Muren Sanden, illustrator (b. 1918)
- 28 November – Elisabet Fidjestøl, politician (b. 1922)
- 3 December – Anne Lorentzen, singer and media researcher (b. 1963)
- 15 December – Frank Meidell Falch, cultural director (b. 1920)
- 15 December – Viking Mestad, jurist (b. 1930)
- 19 December – Hans Kvalbein, theologian (b. 1942)
- 21 December – Egil Storeide, painter and film set decorator (b. 1940)
- 22 December – David Kvebæk, family therapist (b. 1933)
- 22 December – Frank Bjerkholt, writer (b. 1927)
- 23 December – Bjarne Kortsen, musicologist (b. 1930)
- 24 December – Jakob Sigurd Holmgard, politician (b. 1929)
- 27 December – Gunn Olsen, politician (b. 1952)
- 30 December – Haakon Sandberg, film director and producer (b. 1924)

Full date missing

- Helge Andersen, author and playwright
- Elisabeth Thams, translator and novelist
- Kurt Valner, songwriter

== See also ==
- 2013 in Norwegian music
