= Lawrence Trent =

English chess player (born 1986)

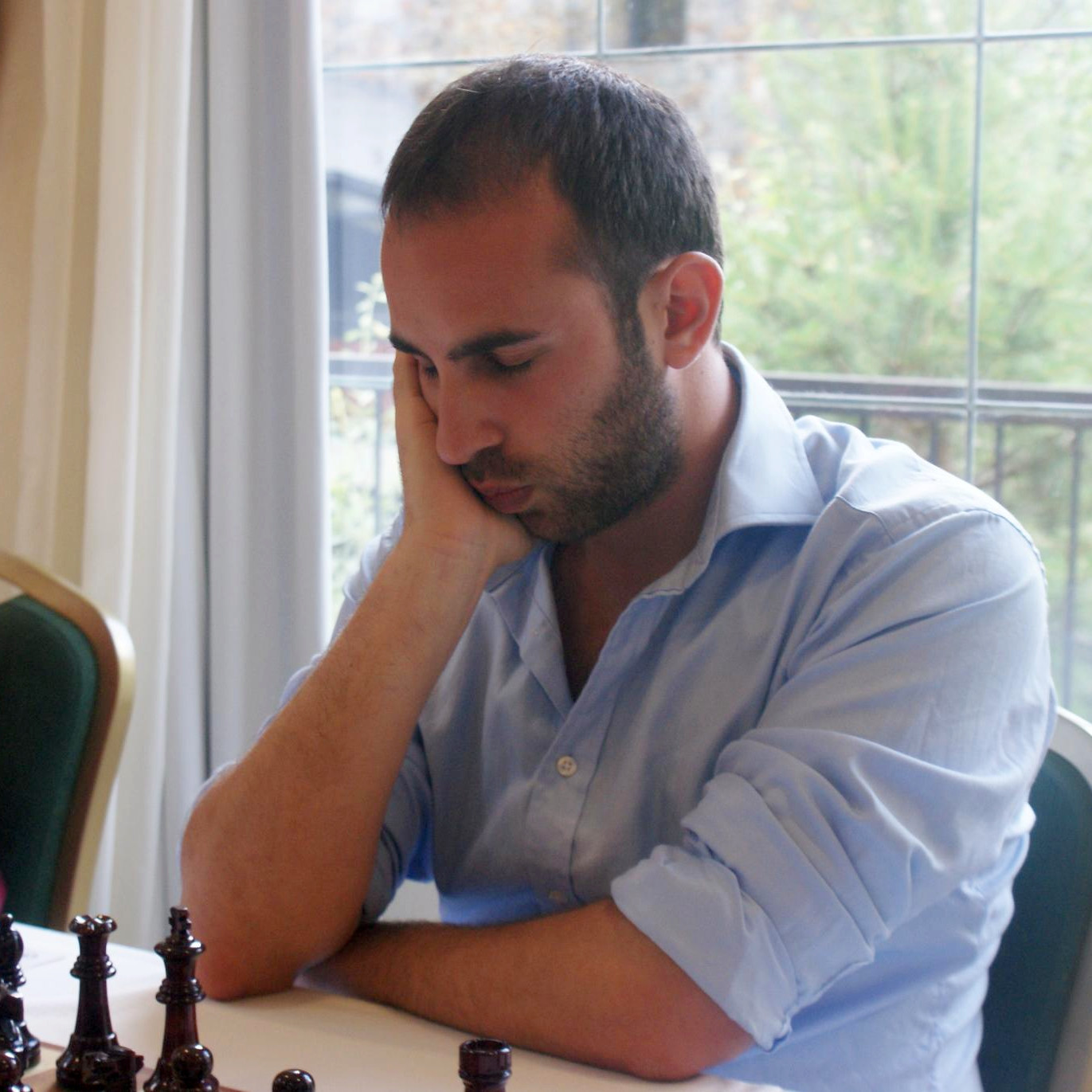

Personal information
- Born: Lawrence Adam Trent; 28 April 1986 (age 40) London, England

Chess career
- Country: England
- Title: International Master (2005)
- FIDE rating: 2409 (November 2026)
- Peak rating: 2487 (January 2009)

Lawrence Trent (born 28 April 1986) is an English International Master chess player and commentator. Trent has host-commentated for major FIDE tournaments, including the World Chess Championship Finals for Anand–Carlsen (2013), World Candidates Tournament (2013), World Chess Cup (2013), and the 41st Chess Olympiad. He has also host-commentated for independent super-tournaments, including the London Chess Classic from 2009 to 2014.

From June 2015 until December 2016, he was the manager of Fabiano Caruana. He has since returned to commentating at high-level chess tournaments.

== Early life and education ==
Lawrence Adam Trent was born in Walthamstow, London, England, to Sharon and Alan Trent. His father taught him how to play chess when he was 8 years old as a rainy-day alternative to his youth football games. A few years later, he won the British Championship three years in a row (U11/U12/U13), represented England in the U12 European Championship (1998), and beat his first grandmaster (GM) in 1999 when he was 13 years old. He later finished in 7th place in the 2003 U18 World Championship.

Trent took a break from chess to study at Lancaster University, graduating with a degree in Spanish and Italian with European Studies. Before returning to chess, Trent spent time in Mexico coaching promising students there.

== Chess commentator ==
As commentator, Trent has an anecdotal style. His commentating career began in 2009, while he was co-hosting a chess news podcast called The Full English Breakfast, produced by Macauley Peterson and co-hosted by Stephen J. Gordon. After listening to Trent on the pilot episode, tournament director Malcolm Pein invited him to host-commentate the annual London Chess Classic. This enabled him to gain the experience necessary to co-commentate the FIDE World Championship Candidates Tournament in 2013 with GM Nigel Short.

Following the Candidates Tournament, Trent host-commentated the 2013 FIDE World Cup with GM Susan Polgar. They focused on simplified analysis, relied very little on computers, and directed their commentary toward the general viewer rather than the experienced player. The duo continued this style at the World Chess Championship 2013, to reach a broad audience for their online and televised broadcast that reached hundreds of millions of people.

Trent has since host-commentated for the 2014 FIDE Chess Olympiad (Tromso, Norway) as well as independent super-tournaments, including the 2014 Tata Steel Chess Tournament (Wijk Aan Zee, Netherlands) and the 2014 Grenke Chess Classic. He also served as analytical commentator for the 2014 Millionaire Chess Tournament (Las Vegas, USA) as well as appearing in its film documentary. He currently serves as commentator for the Chess24.com chess platform, which hosts live commentary for major tournaments throughout the year.

== Chess career ==
Lawrence Trent has won numerous national youth championships, and he has also represented his country at international youth events. From a promising tournament result at the Porto San Giorgio Open in 2003, he followed up with two strong performances in the 4NCL to claim his IM title in 2005. Porto San Giorgio was also where he scored his first Grandmaster norm, with back-to-back victories in 2005 and 2006. He won a second GM norm at the HSK (Hamburg Chess Club) tournament in Germany 2014, finishing 2nd to GM Ľubomír Ftáčnik. He has not yet managed to secure his final GM norm, but has made some attempts.

Trent is active in league chess. He currently plays for SF Katernberg in the German Bundesliga. He has also played for various teams in the highest British league, the Four Nations Chess League (4NCL), with five years for the Wood Green Hilsmark Kingfisher team. One of Trent's victories in a 4NCL League match game (Barbican 4NCL 2 v Wood Green) resulted in an unusual position remaining on the board.

Trent - Tan 1-0, 2002 - Final Position

Position: b8 black knight, e8 white queen, g8 black rook, a7 black rook, f7 white knight, h7 black king, a6 black bishop, b6 black queen, c6 black pawn, f6 black pawn, h6 black pawn, a5 black pawn, d5 black pawn, f5 black pawn, h5 white pawn, a4 black pawn, d4 white pawn, g3 white queen, b2 white pawn, c2 white pawn, g2 white pawn, c1 white king, d1 white rook, f1 white bishop

'...with each queen being able to deliver mate in one upon capture of the other.'

The finish of Trent vs Tan was presented in Edward Winter's Chess Explorations, and is a position on which FM Jonathan Rogers commented: "A novel situation, as far as I know. Has anyone before seen a serious game where one side has two queens, both en prise and unprotected even, to the same enemy piece, with each queen being able to deliver mate in one upon the capture of the other?" This 'chess oddity’ was reached by the following moves: 1 d4 Nf6 2 Bg5 e6 3 e4 h6 4 Bxf6 Qxf6 5 Qd2 d5 6 Nc3 c6 7 O-O-O Bb4 8 e5 Qd8 9 a3 Be7 10 f4 a5 11 Nf3 b5 12 a4 Bb4 13 Qe3 Bxc3 14 Qxc3 bxa4 15 h4 Qb6 16 Rh3 Ba6 17 Rg3 O-O 18 f5 exf5 19 Qe3 Kh8 20 e6 f6 21 e7 Re8 22 Ne5 Ra7 23 Rxg7 Kxg7 24 Qg3+ Kh8 25 Nf7+ Kh7 26 h5 Rg8 27 e8(Q) Resigns.

Trent received a prize for the best game in the 2013 Andorra Open in Erts La Massana. It was for victory from the Black side of an Albin Countergambit in the third round against Héðinn Steingrímsson: 1. d4 d5 2. c4 e5 3. de5 d4 4. Nf3 Nc6 5. a3 Bg4 6. Qb3 Qd7 7. Qb7 Rb8 8. Qa6 Nge7 9. Nbd2 Ng6 10. g3 d3 11. e3 Bb4 12. Bg2 Bd2 13. Nd2 Nge5 14. O-O Bh3 15. Bh3 Qh3 16. f4 O-O 17. c5 Ng4 18. Nf3 d2 19. Bd2 Rb2 20. Qe2 Re8 21. e4 h6 22. Rfb1 Re4 23. Qf1 Qf1 24. Rf1 Re2 25. h3 Nh2 26. Nh2 Red2 27. Nf3 Rg2 28. Kh1 Rg3 29. Rad1 Rh3 30. Kg1 Rg3 31. Kh1 Rb3 32. Ng1 Rgd3 33. f5 Ra3 34. f6 gf6 35. Rd3 Rd3 36. Rf6 Ne5 37. Rh6 c6 38. Rh4 Rd1 39. Rf4 Rc1 40. Kg2 Rc5 41. Ne2 a5 42. Ng3 Kf8 43. Kf1 Rc3 44. Kg2 Rc2 45. Kf1 c5 46. Ra4 Nc6 47. Nf5 Rh2 48.Nd6 Ke7 49. Nb7 Rc2 50. Na5 Na5 51. Ra5 Ke6 52. Ke1 f5 53. Kd1 Rc4 54. Ra8 Re4 55. Kd2 c4 56. Ra5 Kf6 57. Ra1 Kg5 58. Rg1 Kf4 59. Rf1 Kg4 60. Rg1 Kh3 61. Rf1 f4 62. Rh1 Kg2 63. Rh4 Kg3.

== Chess boxing ==
Trent had a chess boxing contest with GM Aman Hambleton on 11 December 2022. Chess.com described it as "the highest-rated chessboxing match in history". Hambleton won via technical knockout in the first round of the boxing portion of the match.
