= Arne Berg =

Arne Berg may refer to:

- Arne Berg (cyclist) (1909–1997), Swedish road racing cyclist
- Arne Berg (ice hockey) (1931–2013), Norwegian ice hockey player
- Rolf Arne Berg (1917–1945), Norwegian aviator in World War II
