= Løseth =

Løseth is a Norwegian surname. Notable people with the surname include:

- Erling Løseth (1927–2013), Norwegian politician
- Lene Løseth (born 1986), Norwegian alpine skier
- Mona Løseth (born 1991), Norwegian alpine skier
- Nina Løseth (born 1989), Norwegian alpine skier
