= Tøraasen =

Tøraasen is a Norwegian surname. Notable people with the surname include:

- Finn Tøraasen (1936–2018), Norwegian footballer
- Knut Tøraasen (1938–2013), Norwegian civil servant and diplomat
