= Fram Committee Nansen Award =

The Fram Committee Nansen Award (Norwegian: Framkomiteens Nansenbelønning) is a Norwegian academic award for polar research named after Fridtjof Nansen. The award has been given out since 1961 by the University of Oslo. It can be awarded to Norwegian researchers who, through a dissertation or otherwise, have made significant contributions to the exploration of the polar areas in biology, geography, geophysics, geology, or oceanography. The award is conferred on Nansen's birthday, October 10.

The Fram Committee Nansen Award is one of several awards associated with Fridtjof Nansen's name. Other awards include the Norwegian Nansen Medal for Outstanding Research, which in turn is linked to the Fridtjof Nansen Award for Outstanding Research, and the Nansen Refugee Award.

== Recipients (selected) ==
| Year | Recipient |
|---|---|
| 1962 | Jonas Fjeldstad |
| 1995 | Jan Mangerud |
| 2003 | Asgeir Brekke |
| 2004 | Jan-Gunnar Winther |
| 2005 | Tore Vorren |
| 2008 | Jon Landvik |
| 2009 | Geir Wing Gabrielsen |
