= Olav Moe =

Norwegian politician

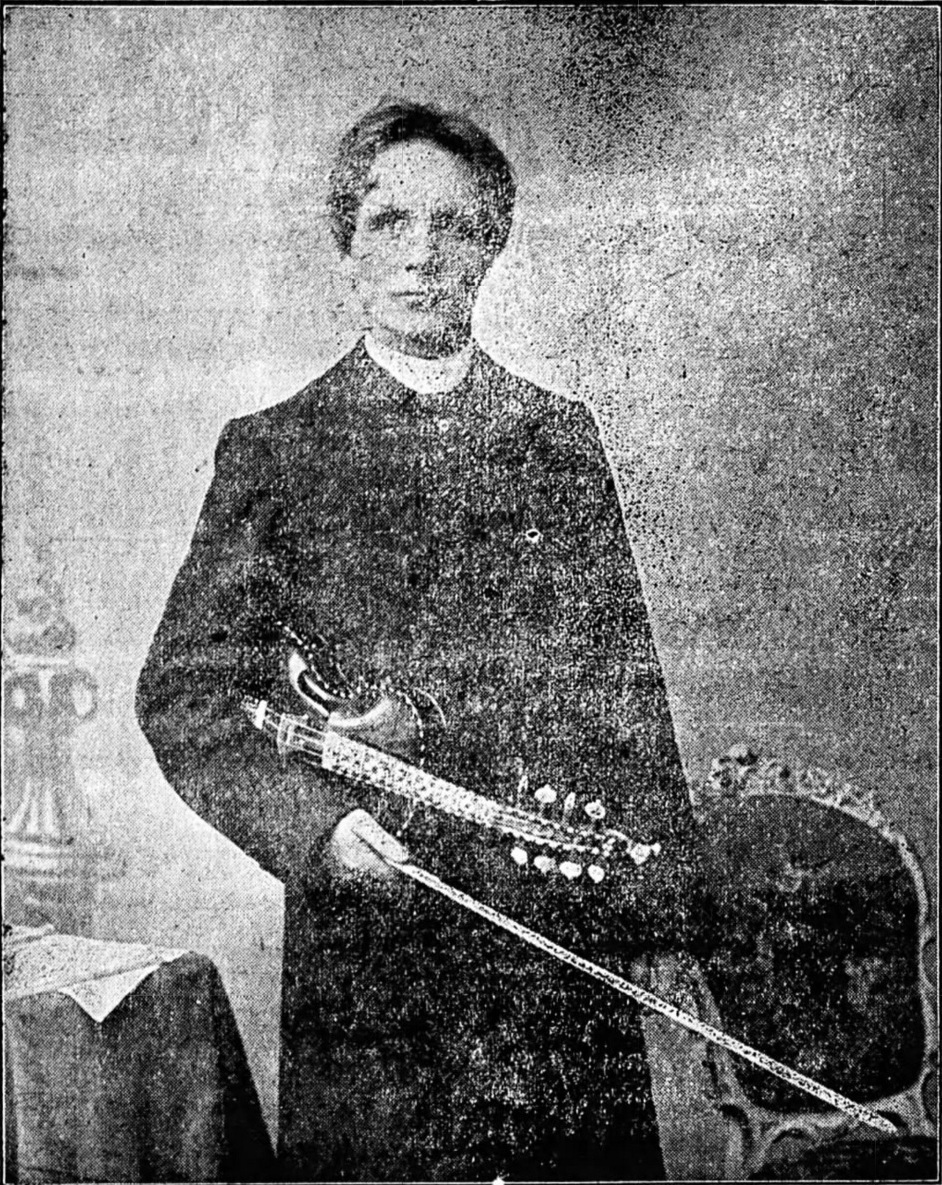
Olav Moe in 1907

Olav Moe (July 23, 1872 – August 11, 1967) was a Norwegian fiddler from the Valdres district.

Olav Moe was born in Vestre Slidre Municipality in Christians amt (county), Norway, the son of Mikkjel Olsen Moe (1849–1934) and Marit Pedersdotter Neste (1850–1878). He started playing fiddle at age seven. His playing style was based on that of Jørn Hilme and he learned the tradition from Jørn Røn, who played in the style of his father, Knut Ringestad, who had learned from Hilme. Moe also learned fiddle tunes from Ola Hamre, Ivar Ringestad, Ulrik i Jensestogun, and Ola Haugset.

In 1897, he participated in a folk music competition in Bergen, and he was a frequent participant at competitions in the following years. This gave him the opportunity to make extensive and good contacts with fiddlers from other parts of Norway. At one of these competitions in 1898, Moe met Edvard Grieg, who encouraged him to travel around to learn as many old tunes as possible. Grieg also advised him to give concerts playing the Hardanger fiddle. Moe became a renowned concert fiddle player. He even traveled to the United States in 1906 to give concerts there, and he made contacts with Norwegian fiddle players that had emigrated to the US. He returned to Norway in 1907, and he also played several concerts in Denmark. Olav Moe inspired Johannes Hanssen to compose his 1904 Valdresmarsjen (Valdres March); a secondary theme in Part A was inspired by one of Moe's tunes.

Moe married Charlotte Lund in 1904 and they had two sons.

Moe participated in establishing the local newspaper Valdres and he served as its editor from 1903 to 1905. He managed the Oppland Farming Association (Oppland Landbruksselskap) for many years. He was politically active and served in the Storting as a member of the Radical People's Party, and was later a member of the Fatherland League. He delivered many speeches at conventions and village festivals, following in the tradition of Bjørnstjerne Bjørnson.

In his old age, Moe was awarded many honors, and he died in 1967 at the age of 95. He was one of the most influential fiddlers in Valdres during his time.
