= Marit Breivik =

Norwegian handball player and coach (born 1955)

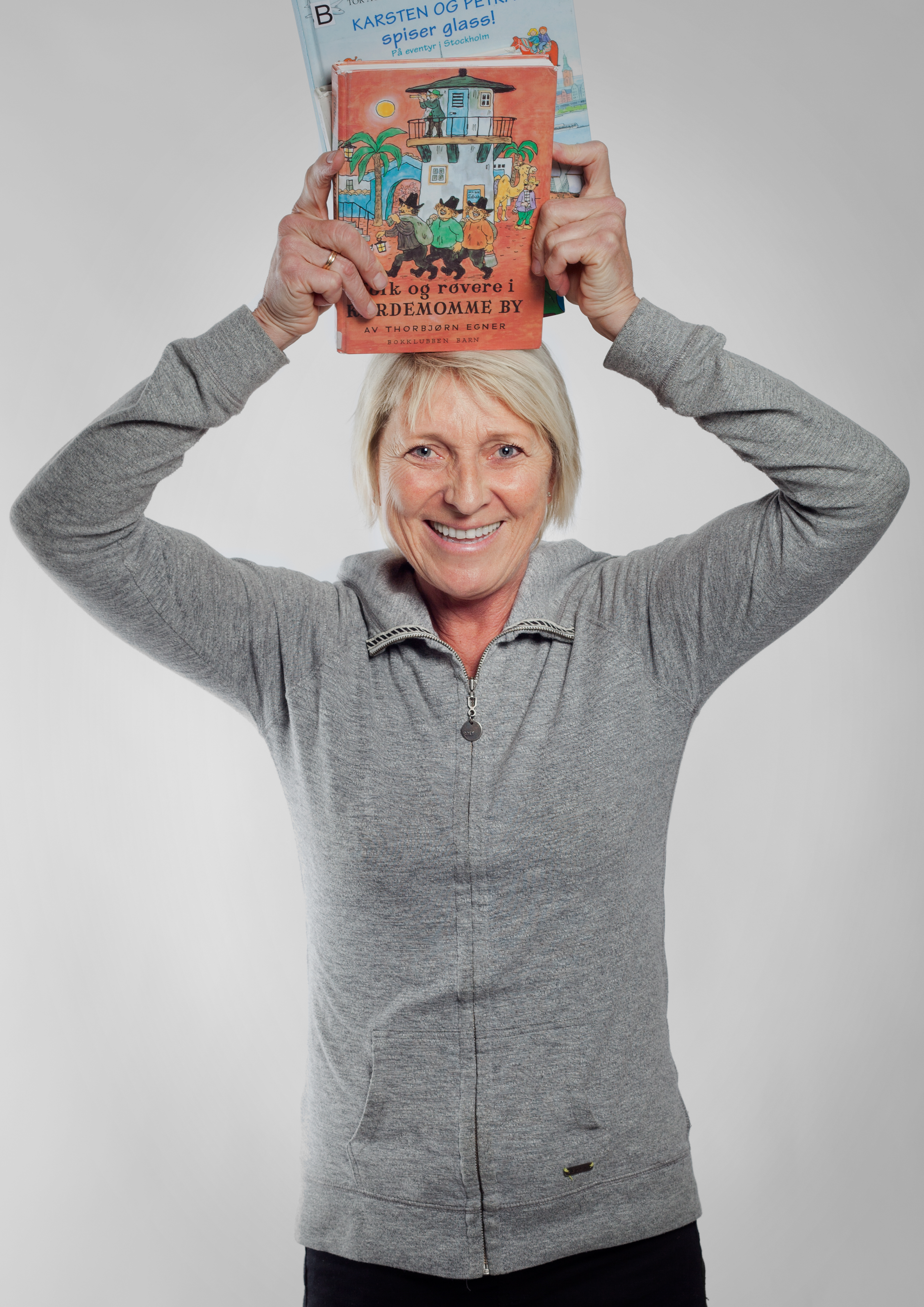
- Marit Breivik as reading ambassador for Nord-Trøndelag county library Credit: Inga Frøseth Rossing / Nord-Trøndelag fylkesbibliotek, 2013

Personal information
- Nationality: Norwegian
- Born: 10 April 1955 (age 71) Levanger, Norway

Sport
- Sport: Handball

Senior clubs
- Years: Team
- –: SK Nessegutten
- –: Nordstrand IF
- –: Skogn IL
National team
Years	Team	Apps	(Gls)
1975–1983	Norway	140	(286)

Teams managed
- –: SK Nessegutten
- 1988–1992: Byåsen IL
- 1992–1994: Larvik HK
- 1994–2009: Norway
Medal record
Women's handball
Representing Norway
Olympic Games
Gold medal – first place	2008 Beijing	Team
Bronze medal – third place	2000 Sydney	Team
World Championship
Gold medal – first place	1999 Norway / Denmark
Silver medal – second place	1997 Germany
Silver medal – second place	2001 Italy
Silver medal – second place	2007 France
European Championship
Gold medal – first place	1998 Netherlands
Gold medal – first place	2004 Hungary
Gold medal – first place	2006 Sweden
Gold medal – first place	2008 Macedonia
Silver medal – second place	1996 Denmark
Silver medal – second place	2002 Denmark
Bronze medal – third place	1994 Germany

Marit Breivik (born 10 April 1955) is a Norwegian former handball player and coach. She is one of the most decorated national team coaches in handball history and won thirteen championship medals with the Norwegian women's national handball team during a fifteen-year reign, including the gold medal at the 2008 Summer Olympics, the World Championship in 1999, and the European Championship in 1998, 2004, 2006 and 2008. Breivik won three Norwegian national championships and two league titles during her career as a player. She was capped 140 times and scored 286 goals for the Norwegian national team from 1975 to 1983.

Breivik is known for her calm, controlled coaching style, knowledge of the sport and tactical innovations. She is noted for her philosophy of including the players in the tactical decision-making and considered a pioneer of the tactical move of swapping the goalkeeper for an extra outfield player during attacks.

== Club career ==
Breivik began her playing career for local team SK Nessegutten and later played for Nordstrand IF. During the 1970s and 1980s, she played for Skogn IL, where she won three Norwegian national championships and two league titles.

== International career ==
Breivik made her debut for the Norwegian national team in 1975, after representing Norway at youth and junior level. She made 140 appearances and scored 286 goals before retiring from the national team in 1983.

== Coaching career ==
Breivik began her coaching career for SK Nessegutten, before becoming the coach of Byåsen IL in 1988. She moved to Larvik HK in 1992 and won the league title in her second year with the club. Breivik became the head coach for the Norwegian women's national team in 1994. Over the course of the next fifteen years, she won one Olympic gold and one bronze medal, one World Championship title and two silver medals, four European Championship titles, two silver medals and one bronze medal with the national team.

In January 2009, Breivik announced her decision to step down as national coach. Following her departure from the national team, Breivik was appointed at the Olympiatoppen, first as head coach for team sports and later as Deputy Director of Elite Sport and Head of Summer Sports, until her retirement in 2022.

== Achievements ==
Olympic Games

- 1996: 4th
- 2000: 3rd
- 2008: 1st

World Championships

- 1995: 4th
- 1997: 2nd
- 1999: 1st
- 2001: 2nd
- 2003: 6th
- 2005: 9th
- 2007: 2nd

European Championships

- 1994: 3rd
- 1996: 2nd
- 1998: 1st
- 2000: 6th
- 2002: 2nd
- 2004: 1st
- 2006: 1st
- 2008: 1st

== Awards and recognitions ==
Breivik was awarded the Håndballstatuetten trophy from the Norwegian Handball Federation in 2000.

On 16 March 2009, King Harald V of Norway appointed Breivik Knight, First Class of the Royal Norwegian Order of St. Olav for her efforts as a role model in Norwegian sports.

== Personal life ==
Breivik was born in Levanger. She was married to Niels Hertzberg, the former secretary general of the Norwegian Handball Federation, until his death during a holiday in Brazil on 2 March 2013. The couple had no children, although her husband had a child from a previous marriage. Breivik studied at the Norwegian School of Sport Sciences and worked as a high school teacher during her playing and early coaching career.

Breivik represented the Socialist Left Party on the municipal council of Levanger Municipality from 1987 to 1991, but has stated that she votes Labour in national elections.

Sporting positions
Preceded by Sven-Tore Jacobsen	Norway women's national handball team head coach 1994 – 2009	Succeeded by Thorir Hergeirsson
