= Jul Haganæs =

Jul Haganæs (22 August 1932 – 3 April 2013) was a Norwegian poet, non-fiction writer and journalist.

He was born in Aurdal and grew up on the farm Flagesletten. Between his début with Aprilnetter in 1965 and his last outing with Nattens bilder in 2004, he released thirteen poetry collections in total. These were translated to both Swedish, Finnish, Icelandic and Polish. He also wrote non-fiction, among others biographies about Ola Viker and Sigurd Lybeck, as well as Nu god Nat min Ven about Knut Hamsun. He also worked as a journalist in Valdres and Samhold.
