= Jonas Fjeldstad =

Norwegian oceanographer and mathematician

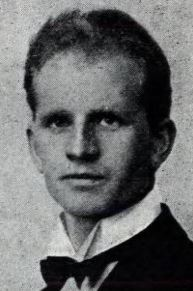
- Fjeldstad in a 1933 publication
- Born: November 22, 1894; Røyken, Norway
- Died: February 20, 1985 (aged 90); Oslo, Norway
- Occupation: Oceanographer

Jonas Ekman Fjeldstad (November 22, 1894 – February 20, 1985) was a prize-winning Norwegian oceanographer and mathematician.

Fjeldstad was born in Røyken. He received his candidatus realium degree at the Royal Frederick University and became an assistant professor of geophysics in 1922 at the University Museum of Bergen. It was Fjeldstad that correctly assumed the existence of the Lomonosov Ridge, which divides the Arctic Ocean into two large ocean basins. To determine this, he used wave data collected by Harald Sverdrup. Fjeldstad continued studying waves for his doctoral degree in 1930, and he developed a general theory of how the ocean's internal waves behave (published as Interne Wellen, Internal Waves, 1933). In 1939 he became a lecturer at the University of Oslo, and he was a professor from 1947 to 1964. He died in Oslo.

== Awards and honors ==
- Member of the Norwegian Academy of Science and Letters, inducted in 1938
- Head of the Norwegian Astronomical Society (1942–1943), the Norwegian Geophysical Society (1946–1950), the Norwegian Mathematical Society (1946–1951), and the National Geodesics and Geophysics Committee
- The Bergen Prize (Bergenske prisbelønning), 1935
- The Fridtjof Nansen Prize for Outstanding Research, 1945
- The Fram Committee Nansen Award, 1962
- Knight 1st Class of the Order of St. Olav, 1965

== Family ==
Jonas Fjeldstad was the son of Johan Fjeldstad (1861–1947) and Emma Christine Ekman (1855–1936). In 1924 he married Ellen Totland (1897–1973).
