= Øyvind Sandberg =

Norwegian film director (1953–2021)

Øyvind Sandberg (24 April 1953 – 13 January 2021), was a Norwegian film director born in Bergen.

== Biography ==
His directing career mainly consists of documentaries depicting Norwegian people leading original and often ancient ways of life. He won two awards at the 2002 Tromsø International Film Festival for his documentary Å seile sin egen sjø (Coastal Life).

Five of his TV documentaries have been released on the DVD Regi: Øyvind Sandberg: Livsstil på hell (1989), Ålefiskerne (1994), Laksefiskerne (1995), Elmer og blomsterbåten (1999) and Konsert for tre hester i to takter (2007).

In October 2012, Sandberg was named Bergen's Best Bergenser by the news website, BT.no.

He was the son of Haakon Sandberg, also a film director.

== Filmography ==
- Kabal i hjerter (2007). Hearts - English title
- Bare en kvist (2004). Simply a Twig - English title
- Å seile sin egen sjø (2002). Coastal Life - English title
