= Candidates Tournament 2013 =

Chess tournament

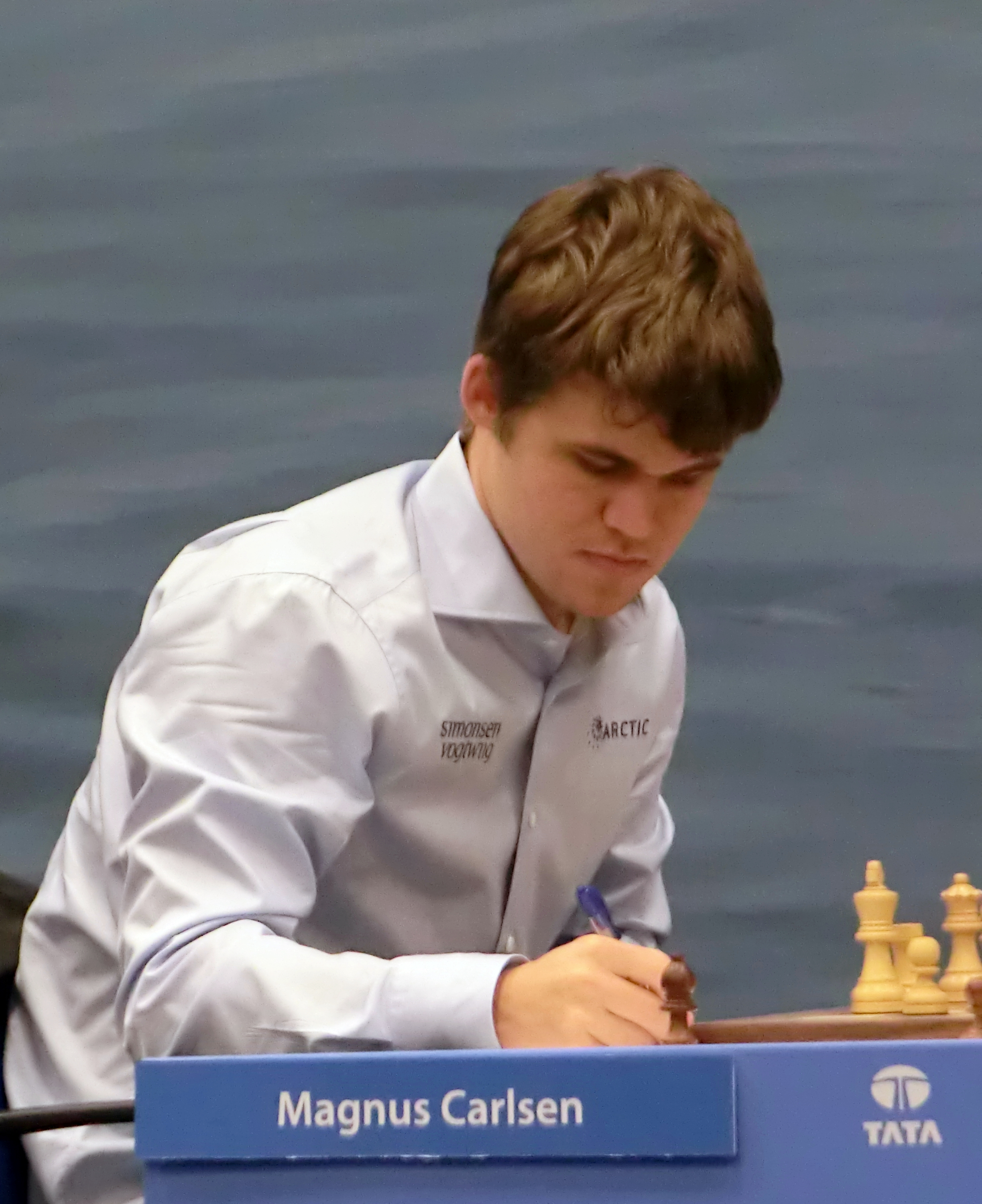
- Magnus Carlsen, the winner of the Candidates Tournament 2013, advanced to the World Chess Championship 2013 match.
- Venue: Institution of Engineering and Technology, Savoy Place
- Location: London, England
- Dates: 15 March – 1 April 2013
- Competitors: 8 from 6 nations
- Winning score: 8.5 points of 14

Champion
- (Norway) Magnus Carlsen

The 2013 Candidates Tournament was an eight-player chess double round-robin tournament that took place in the Institution of Engineering and Technology in London, from 15 March to 1 April 2013. The purpose of the tournament was to determine the player who would challenge reigning world chess champion Viswanathan Anand in the 2013 World Chess Championship match.

This was the first time in 51 years that the round-robin format had been used for a Candidates, though it had been used for the 2005 (FIDE) and 2007 world championships.

The tournament was won by Magnus Carlsen, on tiebreak ahead of Vladimir Kramnik, after a dramatic final round in which they both lost.

== Participants ==
The participants were:

Qualification path	Player	Age	Rating (March 2013)	World Ranking
The top three finishers in the Chess World Cup 2011	(Russia) Peter Svidler	36	2747	14
The top three finishers in the Chess World Cup 2011	(Russia) Alexander Grischuk	29	2764	10
The top three finishers in the Chess World Cup 2011	(Ukraine) Vasyl Ivanchuk	43/44	2757	13
The three highest rated players in the world, excluding any of the above or below (average from July 2011 and January 2012 FIDE rating lists)	(Norway) Magnus Carlsen	22	2872	1
The three highest rated players in the world, excluding any of the above or below (average from July 2011 and January 2012 FIDE rating lists)	(Armenia) Levon Aronian	30	2809	3
The three highest rated players in the world, excluding any of the above or below (average from July 2011 and January 2012 FIDE rating lists)	(Russia) Vladimir Kramnik	37	2810	2
Candidates Tournament Organizing committee's wild card (FIDE rating in January 2012 at least 2700)	(Azerbaijan) Teimour Radjabov	26	2793	4
Runner up of the World Chess Championship 2012	(Israel) Boris Gelfand	44	2740	18

== Prize fund ==
The tournament had a prize fund of €510,000 ($691,101). Prize money was shared between players tied on points; tiebreaks were not used to allocate it. The prizes for each place were as follows:

- 1st place – €115,000
- 2nd place – €107,000
- 3rd place – €91,000
- 4th place – €67,000
- 5th place – €48,000
- 6th place – €34,000
- 7th place – €27,000
- 8th place – €21,000

== Summary ==
Before the tournament Carlsen was considered the favourite, with Kramnik and Aronian being deemed his biggest rivals. Ivanchuk was considered an uncertain variable, due to his instability, and the other players were considered less likely to win the event.

During the first half of the tournament, Aronian and Carlsen were considered the main contestants for first place. At the halfway point they were tied for first, one-and-a-half points ahead of Kramnik and Svidler. In the second half Kramnik, who had drawn his first seven games, became a serious contender after scoring four wins, while Aronian lost three games, and was thus left behind in the race. Carlsen started the second half by staying ahead of the field, but a loss to Ivanchuk allowed Kramnik to take the lead in round 12 by defeating Aronian. In the penultimate round Carlsen pulled level with Kramnik by defeating Radjabov, while Kramnik drew against Gelfand.

Before the last round only Carlsen and Kramnik could win the tournament; they were equal on 8½ points, 1½ points ahead of Svidler and Aronian. Carlsen had the better tiebreak (on the first tiebreak the score from their individual games was 1–1, but Carlsen was ahead on the second tiebreak due to having more wins), and this would not change if they both scored the same in the final round. Therefore, Kramnik, who had black against Ivanchuk, needed to outperform Carlsen, who had white against Svidler. Carlsen played to win, since that would guarantee him the tournament victory regardless of Kramnik's result; similarly, Kramnik knew that the odds of Carlsen losing with white were minute, and he went all-in against Ivanchuk with the Pirc Defense. This backfired and Ivanchuk obtained an early advantage, while Carlsen got a level position against Svidler. Carlsen later got into serious time trouble and did not defend adequately against Svidler's attack, which gave Svidler a winning endgame. Meanwhile, Ivanchuk had outplayed Kramnik, who resigned a few minutes after Carlsen lost. Thus the tournament was won by Carlsen on the second tiebreak. Carlsen's win earned him the right to challenge the reigning world champion, Viswanathan Anand, for the world title in the World Chess Championship 2013.

== Standings ==
Final standings of the 2013 Candidates Tournament
Rank	Player	Rating March 2013	CAR		KRA		SVI		ARO		GEL		GRI		IVA		RAD		Points	Tiebreaks	
Rank	Player	Rating March 2013	CAR		KRA		SVI		ARO		GEL		GRI		IVA		RAD		Points	H2H	Wins
1	Magnus Carlsen (NOR)	2872			½	½	0	1	½	½	1	1	1	½	0	½	½	1	8½	1	5
2	Vladimir Kramnik (RUS)	2810	½	½			1	½	½	1	½	½	½	1	½	0	1	½	8½	1	4
3	Peter Svidler (RUS)	2747	0	1	½	0			1	½	½	½	½	½	1	½	1	½	8	1½	4
4	Levon Aronian (ARM)	2809	½	½	0	½	½	0			1	0	½	½	1	1	1	1	8	½	5
5	Boris Gelfand (ISR)	2740	0	0	½	½	½	½	1	0			½	½	½	½	½	1	6½	1	2
6	Alexander Grischuk (RUS)	2764	½	0	0	½	½	½	½	½	½	½			1	½	½	½	6½	1	1
7	Vasyl Ivanchuk (UKR)	2757	½	1	1	½	½	0	0	0	½	½	½	0			1	0	6	—	3
8	Teimour Radjabov (AZE)	2793	0	½	½	0	½	0	0	0	0	½	½	½	1	0			4	—	1

== Results by round ==
Pairings and results. First named player is white. 1–0 indicates a white win, 0–1 indicates a black win, and ½–½ indicates a draw. Numbers in parentheses indicate players' scores prior to the round.

Round 1 – 15 March 2013
Levon Aronian	Magnus Carlsen	½–½	E11 Bogo-Indian
Boris Gelfand	Teimour Radjabov	½–½	E11 Bogo-Indian
Vasyl Ivanchuk	Alexander Grischuk	½–½	E06 Catalan, Closed
Peter Svidler	Vladimir Kramnik	½–½	D35 Queen's Gambit Declined
Round 2 – 16 March 2013
Magnus Carlsen (½)	Vladimir Kramnik (½)	½–½	A33 English, Symmetrical
Alexander Grischuk (½)	Peter Svidler (½)	½–½	C84 Ruy Lopez
Teimour Radjabov (½)	Vasyl Ivanchuk (½)	1–0	A88 Dutch, Leningrad
Levon Aronian (½)	Boris Gelfand (½)	1–0	A04 Réti Opening
Round 3 – 17 March 2013
Boris Gelfand (½)	Magnus Carlsen (1)	0–1	D52 Queen's Gambit Declined
Vasyl Ivanchuk (½)	Levon Aronian (1½)	0–1	A45 Trompowsky Attack
Peter Svidler (1)	Teimour Radjabov (1½)	1–0	E81 King's Indian, Sämisch
Vladimir Kramnik (1)	Alexander Grischuk (1)	½–½	D71 Neo-Grünfeld
Round 4 – 19 March 2013
Magnus Carlsen (2)	Alexander Grischuk (1½)	1–0	C65 Ruy Lopez
Teimour Radjabov (1½)	Vladimir Kramnik (1½)	½–½	E54 Nimzo-Indian, 4. e3
Levon Aronian (2½)	Peter Svidler (2)	½–½	D22 Queen's Gambit Accepted
Boris Gelfand (½)	Vasyl Ivanchuk (½)	½–½	D07 Chigorin Defense
Round 5 – 20 March 2013
Vasyl Ivanchuk (1)	Magnus Carlsen (3)	½–½	D93 Grünfeld, Bf4 & e3
Peter Svidler (2½)	Boris Gelfand (1)	½–½	D85 Grünfeld, Exchange
Vladimir Kramnik (2)	Levon Aronian (3)	½–½	A07 King's Indian Attack
Alexander Grischuk (1½)	Teimour Radjabov (2)	½–½	D35 Queen's Gambit Declined
Round 6 – 21 March 2013
Peter Svidler (3)	Magnus Carlsen (3½)	0–1	C84 Ruy Lopez, Closed
Vladimir Kramnik (2½)	Vasyl Ivanchuk (1½)	½–½	E00 Queen's Pawn Game
Alexander Grischuk (2)	Boris Gelfand (1½)	½–½	B30 Sicilian, Rossolimo
Teimour Radjabov (2½)	Levon Aronian (3½)	0–1	C65 Ruy Lopez
Round 7 – 23 March 2013
Magnus Carlsen (4½)	Teimour Radjabov (2½)	½–½	B30 Sicilian, Rossolimo
Levon Aronian (4½)	Alexander Grischuk (2½)	½–½	E18 Queen's Indian
Boris Gelfand (2)	Vladimir Kramnik (3)	½–½	E54 Nimzo-Indian, 4. e3
Vasyl Ivanchuk (2)	Peter Svidler (3)	½–½	C45 Scotch Game

Round 8 – 24 March 2013
Magnus Carlsen (5)	Levon Aronian (5)	½–½	E06 Catalan, Closed
Teimour Radjabov (3)	Boris Gelfand (2½)	0–1	A33 English, Symmetrical
Alexander Grischuk (3)	Vasyl Ivanchuk (2½)	1–0	B35 Sicilian, Accelerated Dragon
Vladimir Kramnik (3½)	Peter Svidler (3½)	1–0	D85 Grünfeld, Exchange
Round 9 – 25 March 2013
Vladimir Kramnik (4½)	Magnus Carlsen (5½)	½–½	E05 Catalan, Open
Peter Svidler (3½)	Alexander Grischuk (4)	½–½	E81 King's Indian, Sämisch
Vasyl Ivanchuk (2½)	Teimour Radjabov (3)	1–0	D57 Queen's Gambit Declined
Boris Gelfand (3½)	Levon Aronian (5½)	1–0	D37 Queen's Gambit Declined
Round 10 – 27 March 2013
Magnus Carlsen (6)	Boris Gelfand (4½)	1–0	B30 Sicilian, Rossolimo
Levon Aronian (5½)	Vasyl Ivanchuk (3½)	1–0	A52 Budapest Gambit
Teimour Radjabov (3)	Peter Svidler (4)	½–½	D85 Grünfeld, Exchange
Alexander Grischuk (4½)	Vladimir Kramnik (5)	0–1	C67 Ruy Lopez
Round 11 – 28 March 2013
Alexander Grischuk (4½)	Magnus Carlsen (7)	½–½	D90 Grünfeld
Vladimir Kramnik (6)	Teimour Radjabov (3½)	1–0	E60 King's Indian
Peter Svidler (4½)	Levon Aronian (6½)	1–0	E26 Nimzo-Indian, Sämisch
Vasyl Ivanchuk (3½)	Boris Gelfand (4½)	½–½	D93 Grünfeld
Round 12 – 29 March 2013
Magnus Carlsen (7½)	Vasyl Ivanchuk (4)	0–1	B48 Sicilian, Taimanov
Boris Gelfand (5)	Peter Svidler (5½)	½–½	D85 Grünfeld, Exchange
Levon Aronian (6½)	Vladimir Kramnik (7)	0–1	D42 Semi-Tarrasch Defense
Teimour Radjabov (3½)	Alexander Grischuk (5)	½–½	E35 Nimzo-Indian, Classical
Round 13 – 31 March 2013
Teimour Radjabov (4)	Magnus Carlsen (7½)	0–1	E32 Nimzo-Indian, Classical
Alexander Grischuk (5½)	Levon Aronian (6½)	½–½	D11 Slav Accepted
Vladimir Kramnik (8)	Boris Gelfand (5½)	½–½	D71 Neo-Grünfeld
Peter Svidler (6)	Vasyl Ivanchuk (5)	1–0	C02 French, Advance Variation
Round 14 – 1 April 2013
Magnus Carlsen (8½)	Peter Svidler (7)	0–1	C84 Ruy Lopez, Closed
Vasyl Ivanchuk (5)	Vladimir Kramnik (8½)	1–0	B08 Pirc Defence, Classical
Boris Gelfand (6)	Alexander Grischuk (6)	½–½	D85 Grünfeld, Exchange
Levon Aronian (7)	Teimour Radjabov (4)	1–0	E90 King's Indian

=== Points by round ===
For each player, the difference between wins and losses after each round is shown. The players with the highest difference for each round are marked with green background.

Final place	Player \ Round	1	2	3	4	5	6	7	8	9	10	11	12	13	14
1	Magnus Carlsen (NOR)	=	=	+1	+2	+2	+3	+3	+3	+3	+4	+4	+3	+4	+3
2	Vladimir Kramnik (RUS)	=	=	=	=	=	=	=	+1	+1	+2	+3	+4	+4	+3
3	Peter Svidler (RUS)	=	=	+1	+1	+1	=	=	−1	−1	−1	=	=	+1	+2
4	Levon Aronian (ARM)	=	+1	+2	+2	+2	+3	+3	+3	+2	+3	+2	+1	+1	+2
5	Boris Gelfand (ISR)	=	−1	−2	−2	−2	−2	−2	−1	=	−1	−1	−1	−1	−1
6	Alexander Grischuk (RUS)	=	=	=	−1	−1	−1	−1	=	=	−1	−1	−1	−1	−1
7	Vasyl Ivanchuk (UKR)	=	−1	−2	−2	−2	−2	−2	−3	−2	−3	−3	−2	−3	−2
8	Teimour Radjabov (AZE)	=	+1	=	=	=	−1	−1	−2	−3	−3	−4	−4	−5	−6
