= Sverre Magelssen =

Sverre Magelssen (8 March 1918 – 2 June 2013) was a Norwegian priest.

He was born in Vågan Municipality as a son of vicar Wilhelm Christian Magelssen (1867–1930) and Sigrid, née Rynning (1874–1957). He finished his secondary education in 1936 and took the cand.theol. degree at the University of Oslo in 1941. In 1944 he married Aslaug Sandøe.

He was hired as a secretary for the Norwegian Christian Youth Association in 1941, then secretary for the Norwegian Universities and Schools Christian Fellowship in 1943. He became secretary-general here in 1947, followed by a stint as secretary-general of the Norwegian Christian Youth Association from 1954 to 1965. This organization later changed their name to YMCA-YWCA of Norway.

He then served in the Church of Norway as vicar in Rjukan from 1965 and Høvik from 1972 to 1987. He was also dean of the Asker og Bærum prosti during this period. Among others he became known for refusing to greet newly hired, liberal curate Helge Hognestad in Høvik.

Magelssen chaired the Norwegian Christian Youth Association from 1970 to 1979 and was a board member of the Norwegian Association of Clergy, Norwegian Church Aid, council member of the Diocese Council of Oslo from 1974 to 1982, Statens Ungdomsråd and the MF Norwegian School of Theology. His son Øystein Magelssen became chairman of the YMCA-YWCA of Norway in 2011.

He was decorated with the King's Medal of Merit in gold. He resided at Slependen. He died in June 2013.
