= Niels Hertzberg (handball) =

Niels Christian Hertzberg (16 January 1941 - 1 March 2013) was the Norwegian sports official.

He was the secretary-general of the Norwegian Handball Federation from 1984 to 2003. He was credited as having the strongest influence on the development of the Norwegian Handball Federation. He was also married to former national team coach for women, Marit Breivik. He died in March 2013 in their vacation home in Brazil, most probably from a fall accident.
