= Helge Solvang =

Norwegian war sailor and politician (1913–2013)

Helge Solvang (3 June 1913 – 26 September 2013) was a Norwegian war sailor and centenarian. At his death, he was Norway's oldest elected politician, representing the Labour Party on the municipal council of Balsfjord Municipality.
