= Tore Magnussen =

Norwegian boxer

Tore Magnussen (12 July 1938 – 5 May 2013) was a Norwegian professional boxer.

He was born in Oslo. As an amateur boxer he won eight Norwegian championships between 1958 and 1965, representing the club BK Pugilist, and became Nordic champion in lightweight in 1965. In his professional career from 1965 to 1972 he won 15 of 27 bouts. Two of his losses were title bouts for the European Boxing Union lightweight title in 1970.
