= Niclas Gulbrandsen =

Norwegian printmaker

Niclas Gulbrandsen (15 March 1930 – 19 July 2013) was a Norwegian printmaker.

He was born in Oslo, and was married to Inger Gulbrandsen. He took his education as a painter at the Norwegian National Academy of Craft and Art Industry from 1951 to 1954 and the Norwegian National Academy of Fine Arts from 1954 to 1957, but after his début exhibition he gave up painting altogether and became an autodidact printmaker. He was exhibited at Høstutstillingen six times, as well as in Sweden, Finland, Italy, Switzerland and Germany, and had solo exhibitions at Kunstnerforbundet four times. His works were bought by Riksgalleriet, the National Gallery of Norway, Arts Council Norway and Statens Museum for Kunst as well as regional institutions.
