= Trygve Goa =

Norwegian printmaker (1925–2013)

Trygve Sterner Goa (10 October 1925 – 5 January 2013) was a Norwegian printmaker.

He was born in Haugesund. Largely autodidactic, he received artistic grants at a grown age. He made his debut at Høstutstillingen in 1978, and had numerous other exhibitions. His works were bought by Riksgalleriet and Arts Council Norway as well as regional institutions. He was also an art critic in Haugesunds Avis between 1966 and 1979.
