= Rolf Wembstad =

Norwegian footballer and official (1927–2013)

Rolf Wembstad (31 August 1927 – 11 October 2013) was a Norwegian footballer and official. He played for the top-league club SK Brann his entire career, spanning from 1947 to 1957, and including the 1950 Norwegian Football Cup, in which Brann finished as runners-up. He later served as chairman of SK Brann's football section, and from 1981 to 1983, as chairman of the club. He was given honorary membership of SK Brann. He died in October 2013.
