= Doris Jørns =

Norwegian writer

Doris Lilian Jørns (9 February 1915 – 15 July 2013) was a Norwegian serial and romantic pulp writer.

She was a prolific writer in the magazine Romantikk, both short stories and feuilletons. Several feuilletons were issued as books, many of them in the Star Series of the publishing house Bladkompaniet, but also two books in the Doris Jørns Series of the publishing house Falcon, issued in 1989.

From the 1960s she also worked in a fabric printing plant. She resided in Fredrikstad and died at the age of 98.
