= Haakon Sandberg =

Norwegian film director

- Born: 30 August 1924
- Died: 30 December 2013 (aged 89)
- Spouse(s): Liv Sandberg

Haakon Sandberg (b. Haakon Philip Fretheim Aall Sandberg; 30 August 1924, Bergen, Norway - 30 December 2013) was a Norwegian film director.

His interest in films began when he and his twin brother, Sverre, received a film projector as a gift from an aunt at the age of 6.

After having studied cinematography in Copenhagen, he and Sverre, who had studied at the New York Institute of Photography, started Svekon Film, a production company, in 1948.

He is the father of film director Øyvind Sandberg.

He was married to Liv, who was also involved in the making of his movies.

== Filmography (selection) ==
- Gråpus som forsvant, 1955
- Bergen Havn, 1958
- Anno, 10 movies (including Bergen, et møtested for mennesker), 1960-1992
- Uten opprør, 1972
- Hanseatene, 1979
- To hus tett i tett, 1985

== Awards ==
- Venice Film Festival Prize for Gråpus som forsvant
