= Margaret Johansen =

Norwegian novelist (1923–2013)

- Born: 4 April 1923; Skien, Norway
- Died: 1 March 2013 (aged 89)
- Occupation: Novelist
- Spouse: Olaf Andreas Johansen

Margaret Johansen (4 April 1923 – 1 March 2013) was a Norwegian novelist.

She was born in Skien, the daughter of Olav Foss (1895–1941) and Astrid Marie Olsen (1886–1991). She was married twice, last to Olaf Andreas Johansen (1912–1985). She lived in Oslo from 1941.

Her novels and short story collections include Om kvinner (1971), Men mannen ler (1973), Det var en gang en sommer (1974), Død og småsuppe (1976), Damenes vals (1978), Du kan da ikke bare gå (1981), Mandagsbarn (1984), Tidsfordriv (1988) and Coras krig (1991). Du kan da ikke bare gå was staged at Trøndelag Teater and performed in Fjernsynsteatret.
