= Aloysius Valente =

Norwegian dancer and choreographer

- Born: 15 October 1926; Oslo, Norway
- Died: 23 March 2013 (aged 86)
- Occupations: Dancer, choreographer and stage instructor

Aloysius Valente (15 October 1926 – 23 March 2013) was a Norwegian dancer, choreographer and stage instructor. He was born in Oslo. He made his breakthrough in the performance Veslefrikk med fela, based on a traditional fairytale. This story was later basis for the first Norwegian dance film from 1953, where he played the title role. He later worked for a number of institutions, including Nationaltheatret, Den Nationale Scene, Det Norske Teatret and Den Norske Opera, and also produced television shows.
