= Inge Paulsen =

Norwegian footballer (1924-2013)

Personal information
- Full name: Inge Cecil Paulsen
- Date of birth: 23 August 1924
- Place of birth: Stavanger, Norway
- Date of death: 4 September 2013 (aged 89)
- Position: Forward

Senior career*
Years	Team	Apps	(Gls)
1945–1950	Viking	46	(52)
1950	Rouen	13	(10)
1951	Sochaux	6	(0)
1951–1956	Viking		
1956–1957	Stavanger		

International career
1947–1959	Norway B	3	(0)
1948	Norway	1	(0)
- * Club domestic league appearances and goals

Inge Paulsen (23 August 1924 – 4 September 2013) was a Norwegian football striker.

Paulsen mostly played for Viking, but in the 1950–51 season he played for Rouen in Ligue 2 and Sochaux in Ligue 1. He represented Norway as a B and senior international.
