= Anne Lorentzen =

Norwegian singer and media researcher

Anne Lorentzen (16 January 1963 – 3 December 2013) was a Norwegian singer and media researcher.

She hailed from Harstad. She issued her first album with the duo Ravn in 1995, before releasing her solo debut as a singer in 1997.

Her 1997 debut album Lykkens ravn received favourable non-score reviews in Bergens Tidende and Dagsavisen Arbeiderbladet among others, and "die throws" of 5 in a number of medium-sized newspapers. "Die throws" of 4 were issued by VG and Dagbladet as well as several regional newspapers. The "die throw" 3 was also given.

Lorentzen's 1999 album Sårt sinn featured lyrics by Hilchen Sommerschild. The album received several favourable reviews with a "die throw" of 5 in both Dagbladet and VG as well as in Aftenposten Aften, Bergensavisen, Harstad Tidende and Romerikes Blad. Some newspapers gave a "die throw" of 4, and one gave just 2 out of 6.

Lorentzen received a doctoral degree in 2009 with a dissertation on women in the music business, Fra "syngedame" til produsent. She was working as a postdoctoral fellow at the Centre for Gender Research when she died in 2013 at age 50.
