= Arne Eriksen =

Norwegian footballer (1918–2013)

Arne Henrik Eriksen (11 June 1918 – 24 July 2013) was a Norwegian footballer. He was born in Sørumsand, but moved to Sarpsborg at the age of 2. He played for Sarpsborg FK, with whom he won the 1939 Norwegian Football Cup, and was capped one for the Norwegian national team. He was Norway's oldest international footballer at the time of his death in 2013, aged 95.
