= Valdres (newspaper) =

Norwegian newspaper

Valdres is a Norwegian newspaper, published in Fagernes, and covering the district of Valdres. The newspaper was founded in 1903, and its first editor was Olav Moe. There are two printed issues per week, and the online newspaper is updated every day. It had a circulation of 9,342 in 2008. The current editor in chief is Hilde Lysengen Havro.
