= Georg Rajka =

Norwegian of Hungarian origin dermatologist

Georg Rajka (10 March 1925 – 16 March 2013) was a Norwegian of Hungarian origin dermatologist and legend of allergy and immunology.

Rajka fled his native Hungary in the wake of the 1956 Hungarian uprising, where he had taken education as a dermatologist, following in the footsteps of his father. Originally settling in Sweden, he worked at Karolinska University Hospital—where he took his doctorate in 1964—and the University Hospital of Umeå.

In 1971 he was appointed as a professor at Rikshospitalet in Oslo, Norway, where he remained until his retirement in 1995. He was an honorary member of the Norwegian Society of Dermatology and since 1989 a fellow of the Norwegian Academy of Science and Letters.

He resided at Haslum, later in Frogner, Oslo. He died in March 2013, shortly after his 88th birthday.

== Rajka medal ==
In his memory and his pioneering work in the field of Atopic Dermatitis, the International Society of Atopic Dermatitis awards every two year a medal to a young investigator who has significantly contributed to this field.
