= Flora McDonald Hartveit =

Norwegian pathologist

Flora McDonald Hartveit (30 August 1931 – 6 August 2013) was a Scottish-Norwegian pathologist.

She was born in British India, but took her medical degree at Glasgow University. Relocating to Norway, she was the first woman to complete the Dr.Med. degree at the University of Bergen. In 1964, and became the first female professor of pathology in Norway in 1971. In addition to her professorship at the University of Bergen she was a chief physician at Haukeland University Hospital.

Her doctoral dissertation regarded breast cancer and she mainly published within cancer research.

She sat on several public boards and committees, including the standing committee on animal testing.
