= Ingebjørg Wærstad =

Norwegian politician

Ingebjørg Wærstad (4 April 1926 – 7 July 2013) was a Norwegian politician for the Centre Party.

She served as a deputy representative to the Parliament of Norway from Telemark during the term 1973–1977. In total she met during 21 days of parliamentary session. She was a housewife in Nome Municipality.
