= Hans Wilhelm Longva =

Norwegian diplomat

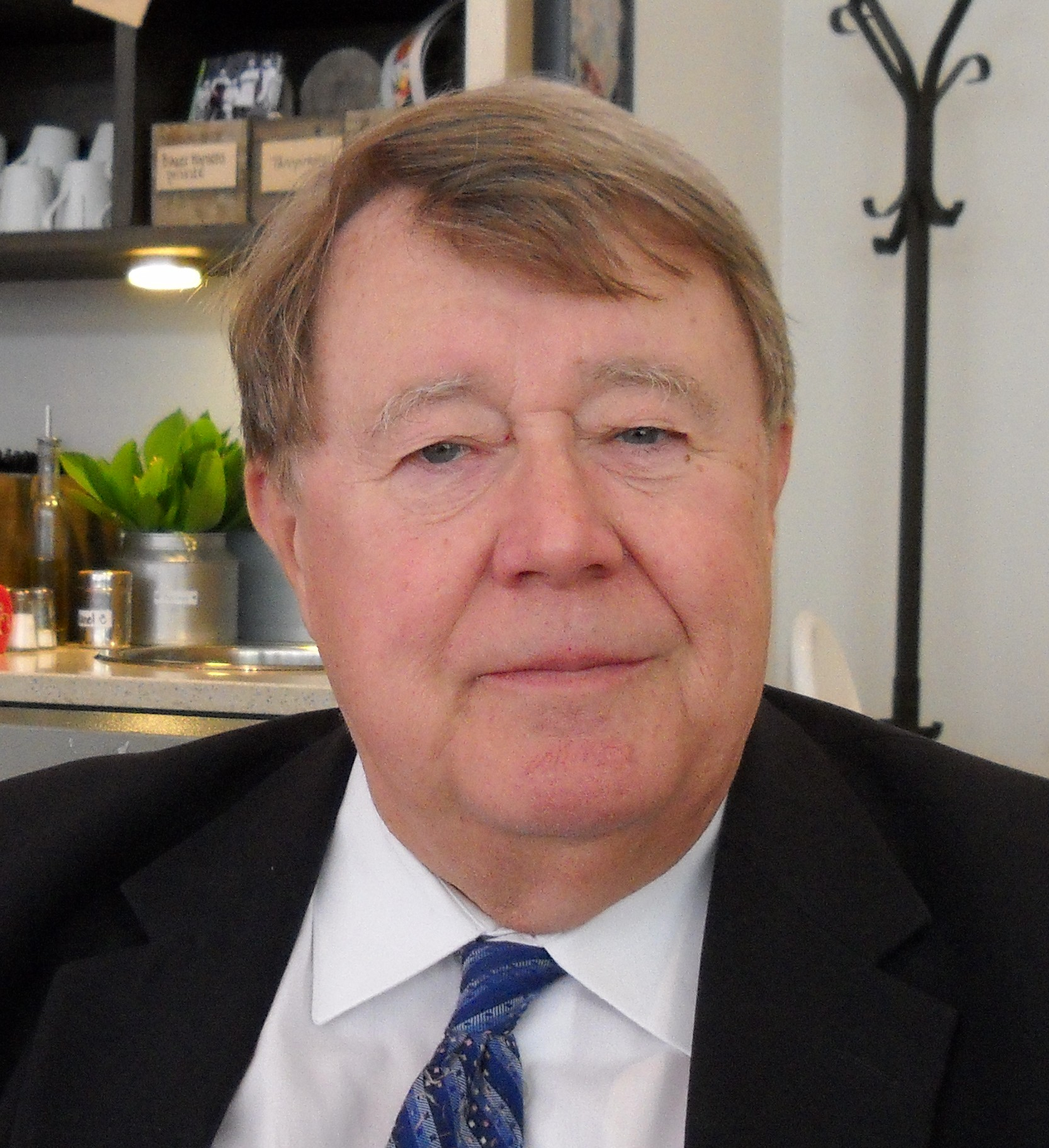
Hans Wilhelm Longva, 2010.

Hans Wilhelm Longva (31 January 1942 – 12 October 2013) was a Norwegian diplomat.

He took the cand.jur. degree, and alter started working for the Norwegian Ministry of Foreign Affairs in 1966. He served as Norway's ambassador to Kuwait from 1984 to 1991, followed by ten years in the Ministry of Foreign Affairs as subdirector until 1994, head of department until 1995 and deputy under-secretary of state from 1995 to 2001. He was then Norway's ambassador to Turkey from 2001 to 2006, briefly stationed in Azerbaijan before serving as ambassador to Syria and Lebanon from 2006 to 2008. He finished his career as special adviser in the Ministry of Foreign Affairs, where he served until his death in 2013.

Longva was stationed in Kuwait during the Gulf War which struck the country. In early 2006, Norway's embassy in Syria was attacked as a part of the Muhammad cartoons controversy.
