= Knut Tøraasen =

Norwegian civil servant and diplomat

Knut Tøraasen (26 October 1938 – 18 November 2013) was a Norwegian civil servant and diplomat.

He held the mag.art. degree and was hired in the Ministry of Foreign Affairs in 1967. He served as Norway's ambassador to Nigeria from 1992 to 1995, as well as Latvia from 1995 to 1999 before becoming a special adviser in the Ministry of Foreign Affairs. He lastly served as Norway's ambassador to Croatia from 2001 to 2005.
