= Tore O. Vorren =

Norwegian geologist (1944–2013)

Tore Ola Vorren (17 April 1944 – 16 June 2013) was a Norwegian geologist.

He took the cand.real. degree in 1970 at the University of Bergen. He was appointed as a lecturer at the University of Tromsø in 1973, took the dr.philos. degree here in 1978 and was promoted to a professor in 1979. He served as both dean and prorector there, and chairman of the University Centre in Svalbard. He was a fellow of the Norwegian Academy of Science and Letters from 1993.
