= Erling Løseth =

Norwegian politician

Erling Løseth (14 December 1927 – 29 April 2013) was a Norwegian educator and politician for the Labour Party.

He was born in Fjaler Municipality as a son of industrial laborer Emil Løseth (1897–1985) and housewife Kristine Kristiansen (1894–1984). He finished his secondary education in 1946 and graduated from Volda Teachers' College in 1949. He worked as a schoolteacher in Hyllestad Municipality for one year, then in Fjaler from 1950, Sauda Municipality from 1953, Ny-Krohnborg in Bergen Municipality from 1955 to 1957 before he became headmaster in Sunde i Sunnhordland. He served as such until 1982 and also doubled as a librarian in Husnes from 1959 to 1977. From 1982 to 1993 he was the school director in Kvinnherad Municipality.

He was elected to the municipal council for Kvinnherad Municipality in 1963, and served until 1975, the last ten years as a member of the executive committee. He was also a member of Hordaland county council from 1971 to 1979. He chaired the local party chapter for three terms (1965–1967, 1971–1973, 1977–1978).

He was elected as a deputy representative to the Parliament of Norway from Hordaland in 1969, 1973 and 1977. He served his entire last term as a regular member of Parliament, moving up to fill the seats of Hallvard Bakke and Arne Nilsen who were members of the cabinet.

Løseth chaired the local teachers' association, sports club and youth association. He was a board member of Den Nationale Scene from 1976 to 1980 and a deputy member of the Regional Development Fund's council from 1973 to 1987.
