= Time trouble =

Concept in chess

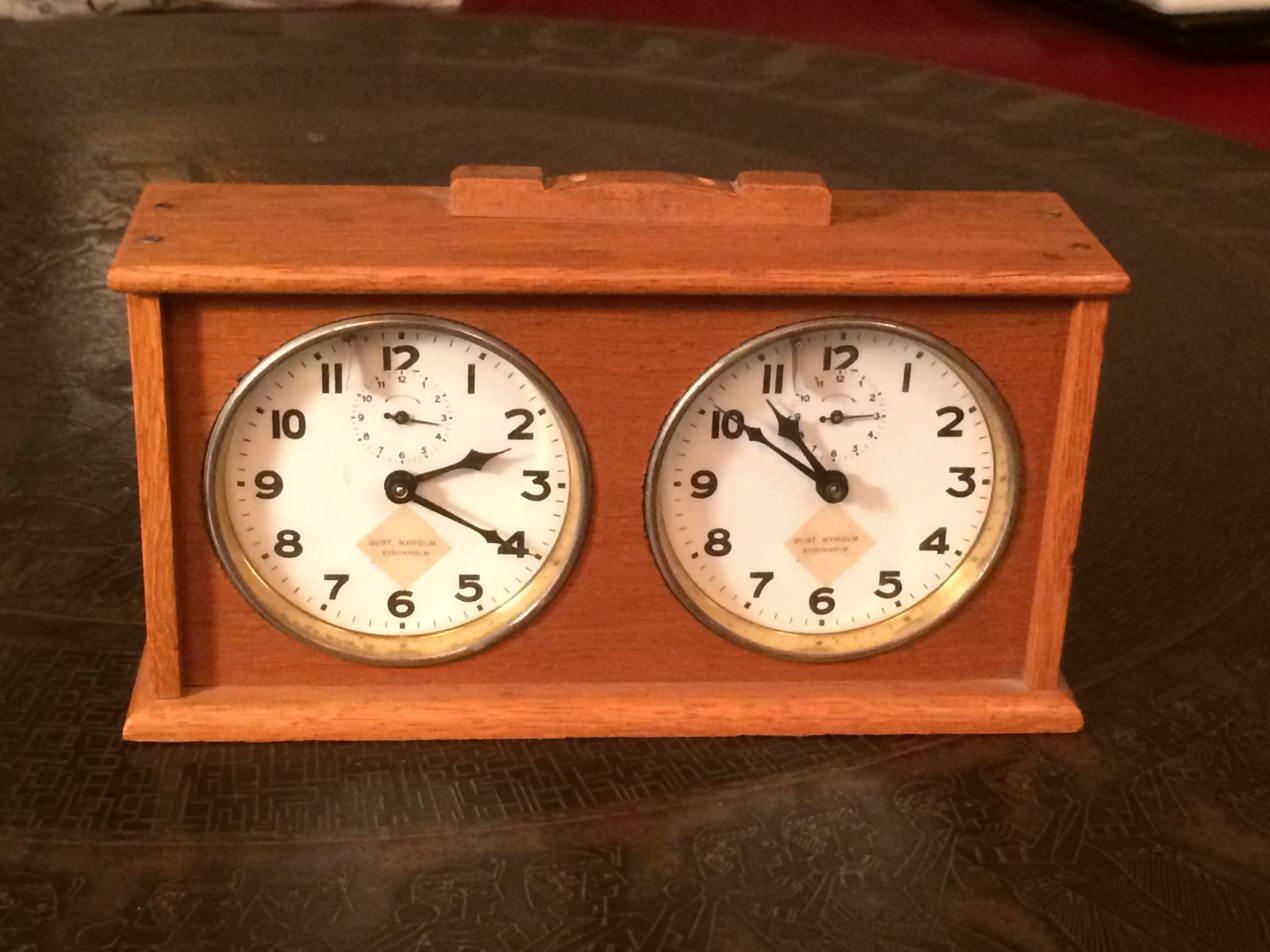
In time trouble, players are usually focused on maintaining the integrity of their position

In chess played with a time control, time trouble, time pressure, or its German translation Zeitnot, is the situation where a player has little time to complete the required moves. When forced to play quickly, the probability of making blunders is increased, so handling the clock is an important aspect of chess playing. The last move of the time control (often move 40) is especially prone to blunders if players only have a few seconds to play it, and many games have been lost due to poor time management in time pressure.

== Practical aspects ==
Players often spend large amounts of time after the opening as they consider their plans and calculate various tactical variations. In many cases, spending this time to find the correct path is worth the risk of time trouble later on if the position is simplified to a point where it can be played quickly. However, spending large amounts of time in simple positions on non-forcing matters is often excessive.

In time trouble, players are usually focused on maintaining the integrity of their position. Lars Bo Hansen's principles are to ensure that pieces remain protected, avoid unnecessary pawn moves, and avoid analyzing unnecessary tactics. Webb advises players to keep track of the number of moves played, and work out a provisional response to each of the opponent's moves on the opponent's time. This trick is called "permanent brain" or "pondering". When the opponent is in time trouble, Webb advocated the barrage technique which involves planning two or more moves ahead, and then playing them in rapid succession. The idea is to give the opponent little time to prepare for the second move, increasing the probability of that move being a mistake. Playing a barrage of moves does increase the chance of a blunder from the barrager as well, and the technique is inadvisable in a winning position where a player should focus on winning on the board.

== Rules governing time trouble ==
FIDE has some additional rules regarding players in time trouble.

The first rule regards the recording of moves. A player with less than five minutes remaining, in a game where there is not a 30-second or greater time increment per move, is not required to keep score as usual. However, if the player makes the time control, he must update the scoresheet before making a move as soon as the flag falls, marking expiry of the first, and now passed, time control. If only one player is in time trouble and not recording moves, the opponent's scoresheet may be used to update the score. In the case of mutual time pressure, where both players have stopped recording the moves, the tournament director or an assistant should be on hand to record the moves as they are played, and their notes can be used to update the scoresheets upon passage of the time control. If the game score is not recorded by anybody during the time pressure period, the players shall endeavor to reconstruct the moves of the game, under the control of the tournament director; if this is not possible the game continues with the next move being regarded as the first move of the next time control.

The second rule regards the arbiter's possibility of ending a game as drawn due to a player's lack of effort in winning the game by "normal means". Occasionally it happens in a sudden death time control without increments that a player has trouble in physically executing an indefinite series of moves in the time remaining. The opponent could try playing on this, and continue to play on in the hopes of winning by time forfeit, rather than by winning the position on the board. To prevent this FIDE allows tournament organizers to apply the guidelines in articles III.4 or III.5. A tournament played with article III.4 allows a player with less than two minutes remaining to summon the arbiter and request that a five-second increment be introduced. Invoking III.4 constitutes a draw offer which the opponent may accept. Otherwise, if the arbiter agrees to introduce the increment, the opponent is awarded two minutes in addition to the increment. In a tournament played with article III.5 a player with less than two minutes may summon an arbiter and request that the game be declared drawn "on the basis that his opponent cannot win by normal means, and/or that his opponent has been making no effort to win by normal means". The arbiter may accept the claim (which ends the game immediately as a draw), reject the claim (after which the game continues, with the opponent receiving two additional minutes), or postpone the decision. In this case the opponent may be given two minutes extra, and the game continues until the arbiter makes a call or the claimant's flag falls after which the arbiter makes a decision.

The rules allowing an arbiter to declare a game drawn do not apply to blitz chess. Several high level blitz tournaments, such as the 2009 World Blitz Championship, are played with a two-second increment which allows players time to execute moves and discourages attempts to win on time in trivially drawn positions such as king and knight versus king and knight.

=== US Chess version ===
Tournaments governed under the rules of the United States Chess Federation have a similar rule to FIDE's guidelines that can be used if this variation is announced beforehand, called the "insufficient losing chances" rule. A player with less than two minutes remaining without time delay or increment can petition the tournament director for a draw on the grounds that the opponent has no reasonable chance of winning the position, had both players had ample time. In US Chess guidelines, this would mean an average tournament player (class C) having a less than a 10% probability of losing the position against a master, with both players having sufficient time. The tournament director may accept the claim (ending the game as drawn), reject the claim and penalize the claimant with one minute less time, or postpone the decision. If the tournament director postpones the decision, there is the option of substituting a non-delay clock with a delay clock with the claimant having his remaining time halved. Since the insufficient losing chances rules calls upon discretion from the tournament director, clocks with the time delay or increment feature are preferred over clocks without them.

== See also ==
- Game clock
- Rules of chess
- Time control
