= Arne Berg (ice hockey) =

Norwegian ice hockey player

Personal information
- Born: 15 September 1931 Bærum, Norway
- Died: 25 January 2013 (aged 81)

Sport
- Sport: Ice hockey

Arne Berg (15 September 1931 – 25 January 2013) was a Norwegian ice hockey player.

He was born in Bærum and represented the club Stabæk IF. He played for the Norwegian national ice hockey team, and participated at the Winter Olympics in 1952, where the Norwegian team placed 9th.
