= List of justices of the Supreme Court of Norway =

List of justices in the Supreme Court of Norway.

== Current ==
Accurate as of 15 March 2018.

Name	Year of birth	Start of term	End of term	Reference
Toril Marie Øie (Chief Justice)	1960	2003	2030	
Magnus Matningsdal	1951	1997	2021	
Karl Arne Utgård	1951	1999	2021	
Bård Tønder	1948	2006	2018	
Clement Endresen	1949	2006	2019	
Hilde Indreberg	1957	2007	2027	
Arnfinn Bårdsen	1966	2008	2036	
Bergljot Webster	1966	2009	2036	
Erik Møse	1950	2009	2020	
Wilhelm Matheson	1955	2009	2025	
Kristin Normann	1954	2010	2024	
Ragnhild Noer	1959	2010	2029	
Henrik Bull	1957	2011	2027	
Knut H. Kallerud	1956	2011	2026	
Per Erik Bergsjø	1958	2012	2028	
Arne Ringnes	1955	2014	2025	
Wenche Elizabeth Arntzen	1959	2014	2029	
Ingvald Falch	1963	2015	2033	
Espen Bergh	1961	2016	2031	
Cecilie Østensen Berglund	1971	2017	2041	
Borgar Høgetveit Berg	1970	2017	2040	

== Former ==
The symbol † denotes that the Justice died while in office.

Name	Year of birth	Start of term	End of term	Reference
Peter Collett	1766	1814	1830	
Jens Peter Debes	1776	1814	1832†	
Andreas Aagaard Kiønig	1831	1814	1837	
Christopher Frimann Omsen	1761	1815	1829†	
Andreas Arntzen	1777	1824	1837†	
Lorentz Lange	1781	1825	1858	
Olaus Michael Schmidt	1784	1829	?	
Henrik Anker Bjerregaard	1792	1838	1842†	
Ulrik Anton Motzfeldt	1807	1842; 1852	1847; 1865†	
Claus Winter Hjelm	1797	1843	?	
Otto Joachim Løvenskiold	1811	1854	1882†	
Christian Wilhelm Andresen	1811	1855	1883	
Frederik Christian Stoud Platou	1811	1862	1864	
Georg Frederik Hallager	1816	1864	1876†	
Christopher Hansteen	1822	1867	1905	
Philip Henrik Hansteen	1817	?	?	
Johan Herman Thoresen	1833	?	1914†	
Ole Andreas Bachke	1830	1884	1890†	
Gregers Winther Wulfsberg Gram	1846	1884	?	
Herman Johan Foss Reimers	1843	1884	?	
Ferdinand Nicolai Roll	1831	1888	1912	
Jacob Rolsdorph Andersen	1828	1890	1901	
Ernst Motzfeldt	1842	1890	1912	
Edvard Hagerup Bull	1855	1893	1918	
Frithjof Prydz	1841	1900	1918	
Emil Stang	1834	1901	1904	
Ole Larsen Skattebøl	1844	1904	1918	
Glør Thorvald Mejdell	1851	1909	1921	
Edward Isak Hambro	1851	1910	1921	
Ditlef Hvistendahl Christiansen	1865	1911	1936	
Johan Herman Lie	1869	1918	?	
Paul Ivar Paulsen	1868	1918	?	
Geirulf Bugge	1862	1919	?	
Arnold Hazeland	1859	1919	1929	
Eyvind Andersen	1874	1921	?	
Haakon Hasberg Breien	1864	1921	1930	
Thorvald Boye	1871	1922	?	
Einar Hanssen	1874	1922	1946	
Johan Castberg	1862	1924	1926†	
Hans Bang	1863	?	?	
Marius Cathrinus Backer	1866	?	?	
Karl Frimann Dahl	1868	?	?	
Johan Albright Rivertz	1874	?	?	
Erling Broch	1875	?	?	
Sigurd Fougner	1878	?	?	
Edvin Alten	1876	1925	1948	
Axel Theodor Næss	1874	1927	?	
Ferdinand Schjelderup	1885	1928	1952	
Helge Klæstad	1885	1929	1946	
Arne Sunde	1883	1935	1936	
Carl Jacob Arnholm (acting)	1899	1935	1939	
Erik Solem	1877	1938	1958	
Anton Cathinco Stub Holmboe	1892	1945	1962	
Reidar Skau	1893	1945	1963	
Henrik Bahr	1902	1945	?	
Bent Berger	1898	1945	1968	
Ernst Fredrik Eckhoff	1905	1945	1975	
Asmund Soelseth	1886	1945	1956	
Fredrik Christian Steffens Sejersted (acting)	1901	1946	1947	
Karsten Gaarder	1902	1946	?	
Carl Kruse-Jensen	1889	1946	1959	
Andreas Schei	1902	1946	1962	
Jørgen Berner Thrap	1898	1946	1968	
Gulbrand Jensen (acting)	1885	1947; 1954	1947; 1954	
Bjarne Rognlien (acting)	1891	1948	1949	
Marius Nygaard	1912	1949	1972	
Otto Helgesen	1898	1950	1968	
Trygve Bendiksby	1907	1952	1977	
Axel Heiberg	1908	1952	1978	
Oscar Christian Gundersen	1908	1953; 1967	1958; 1977	
Finn Hiorthøy	1903	1955	1973	
Carl Fridtjof Rode	1897	1956	1967	
Thor Breien (acting)	1899	1957	1957	
Atle Roll-Matthiesen	1906	1958	?	
Trygve Leivestad	1907	1958	?	
Andreas Endresen	1908	1959	1978	
Per Lykke Anker	1900	1962	1970	
Carl Ludovico Stabel	1912	1963	1982	
Kristen Andersen (acting)	1907	1965	1965	
Johannes Andenæs (acting)	1912	?	?	
Knut Blom	1916	1968	1986	
Lilly Bølviken	1914	1968	1984	
Jens Christian Mellbye	1914	1968	1992	
Rolv Ryssdal	1914	1969	1984	
Per Tønseth	1914	1969	1984	
Elisabeth Schweigaard Selmer	1923	1971	1990	
Sigurd Lorentzen	1916	1972	1979†	
Hans Methlie Michelsen	1920	1972	1990	
Harald Magne Elstad	1913	1973	1983	
Arne Christiansen	1926	1974	1996	
Helge Røstad	1923	1976	1993	
Egil Endresen	1920	1977	1988	
Tore Sinding-Larsen	1929	1977	1997	
Einar Løchen	1918	1977	1985	
Jan Skåre	1929	1978	1998	
Rolv Hellesylt	1927	1979	1997	
Gunnar Aasland	1936	1979	2006	
Jens Bugge	1930	1982	2000	
Jan Frøystein Halvorsen	1928	1983	1995	
Trond Dolva	1934	1984	2004	
Nils Peder Langvand	1929	1984	1996	
Finn Backer	1927	1985	1997	
Ketil Lund	1939	1990	2009	
Karenanne Gussgard	1940	1990	2010	
Peter Lødrup (acting)	1932	1991	1998	
Steinar Tjomsland	1948	1991	?	
Leif Eldring	1933	1994	1994†	
Magnus Aarbakke	1934	1994	2002	
Agnes Nygaard Haug (acting)	1933	1994	1995	
Kirsti Coward	1940	1994	2010	
Eilert Stang Lund	1939	1995	2009	
Lars Oftedal Broch	1939	1996	2009	
Hans Flock	1940	1996	2010	
Georg Fredrik Rieber-Mohn	1945	1997	2007	
Karin Maria Bruzelius	1941	1997	2011	
Odd Jarl Pedersen (acting)	1944	1998	1998	
Nina Frisak	1950	2000	2001	
Sverre Mitsem	1944	2002	2005†	
Ole Bjørn Støle	1950	2002	2010†	
Frederik Zimmer (acting)	1944	2002	2003	
Tone Sverdrup (acting)	1951	2006	2009	
Erik Møse	1950	2008	2011	
Kristin Sandberg (acting)	1954	2010	2011	
Aage Thor Falkanger	1965	2010	2014	Appointed as Parliamentary Ombudsman.
