= 1929 in Norway =

- Centuries: 18th; 19th; 20th; 21st
- Decades: 1900s; 1910s; 1920s; 1930s; 1940s
- See also: List of years in Norway

Events in the year 1929 in Norway.

== Incumbents ==
- Monarch – Haakon VII.

== Events ==
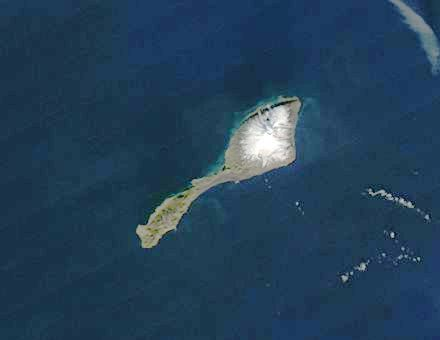
Norway annexed the volcanic island Jan Mayen

- 21 March - Crown Prince Olav (later King Olav) married his cousin, Princess Märtha of Sweden.
- 8 May
  - Norway annexed the volcanic island Jan Mayen located in the Arctic Ocean.
  - Seamen organize a general strike in opposition to proposed wage cuts.

== Notable births ==
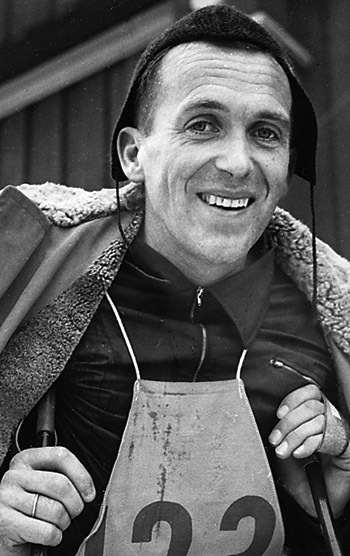
Hallgeir Brenden

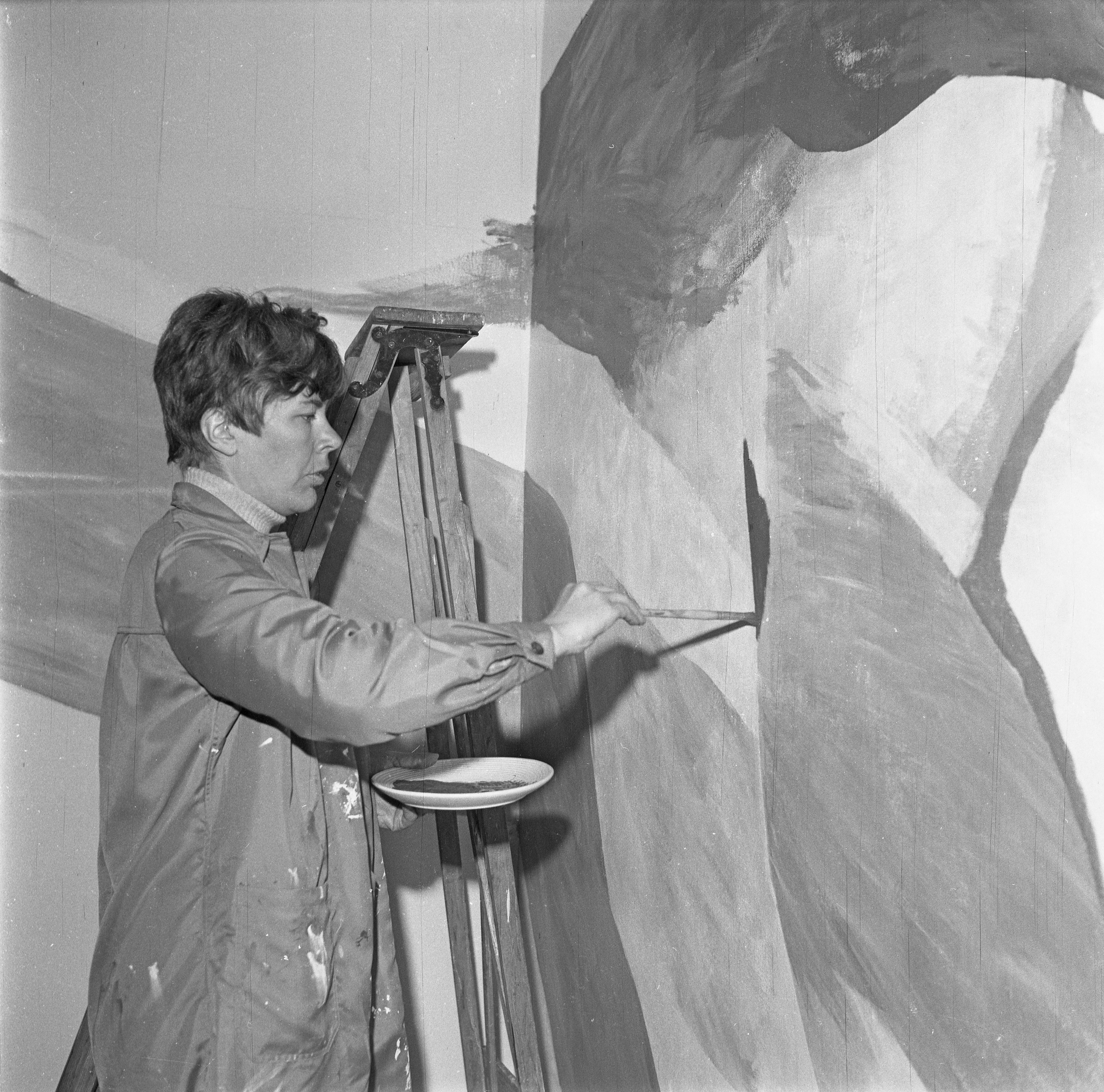
Inger Sitter

- 1 January – Fredrik Olsen, shipping magnate
- 9 January – Håkon Bleken, painter and graphic artist (died 2025)
- 17 January – Jan Rasmus Skåre, judge (died 2018)
- 3 February – Arvid Johanson, politician and minister (died 2013)
- 10 February
  - Hallgeir Brenden, cross country skier and double Olympic gold medallist (died 2007)
  - Einar W. Sissener, businessperson (died 2008)
- 16 February – Thorstein Rittun, painter, illustrator and ceramist (died 2018).
- 26 February – Bjørn Skau, politician and minister (died 2013)
- 4 March – Fredrik Hagemann, geologist and public servant (died 2019).
- 5 April – Ivar Giaever, physicist, shared the Nobel Prize in Physics in 1973
- 19 April – Guttorm Berge, alpine skier and Olympic bronze medallist (died 2004)
- 20 April – Knut S. Heier, geochemist (died 2008)
- 6 May – Jorun Askersrud, cross country skier and athlete (died 2012)
- 7 May – Arnsten Samuelstuen, ski jumper (died 2012)
- 10 May
  - Audun Boysen, middle-distance runner and Olympic bronze medallist (died 2000)
  - John Gjerde, politician (died 2005)
- 28 or 29 May – Dag Frogner, painter and scenographer (died 2015).
- 31 May – Halvdan Ljøsne, painter (died 2006)
- 11 June – Per Almar Aas, politician (died 2014)
- 24 June – Oddvar Barlie, sports wrestler (died 2017).
- 1 July – Sigurd Berge, composer (died 2002)
- 8 July – Gunnar Block Watne, engineer and businessperson, introduced prefabricated houses in Norway (died 2016).
- 8 July – Finn Hald, ceramist (died 2010).
- 13 July – Svein Ellingsen, visual artist and hymnist (died 2020)
- 18 July – Kai Ekanger, politician (died 2018)
- 26 August – Willy Arne Wold, politician (died 1996)
- 24 September – Kåre Rønning, politician (died 1990)
- 30 September
  - Kjell Askildsen, writer (died 2021)
  - Helga Gitmark, politician (died 2008)
- 18 October – Inger Sitter, painter and printmaker (died 2015).
- 19 October – Thorbjørn Kultorp, politician (died 2004)
- 22 October – Tore Sinding-Larsen, judge (died 2013)
- 30 November – Leif Haraldseth, trade unionist, politician and minister (died 2019)
- 13 December – Lars Skytøen, politician and minister (died 2016)
- 14 December – Magne Lerheim, politician (died 1994)
- 24 December – Sverre Wilberg, actor (died 1996)

=== Full date unknown ===
- Øystein Elgarøy, astronomer (died 1998)
- Nils Peder Langvand, judge (died 2002)
- Gunnar Solum, politician (died 2008)

== Notable deaths ==
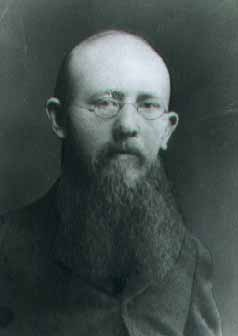
Christian Holtermann Knudsen

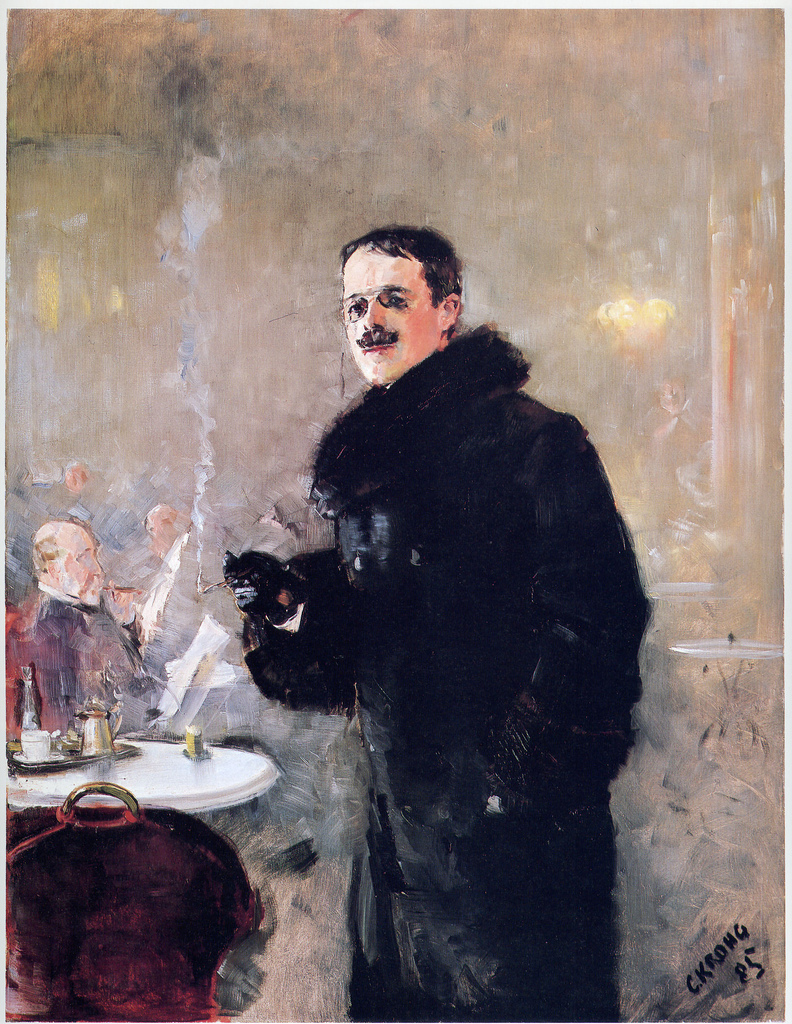
Gerhard Munthe

- 6 January – August Herman Halvorsen, politician (born 1866)
- 22 February – Gunnar Heiberg, playwright (born 1857).
- 23 March – Rudolf Nilsen, poet and journalist (born 1901)
- 2 May – Anders Svor, sculptor (born 1864)
- 24 May – Just Bing Ebbesen, priest and politician (born 1847)
- 8 June – Ole Larsen Skattebøl, judge and politician (born 1844)
- 9 July – Hans Andersen Foss, author, newspaper editor and temperance leader in America (born 1851)
- 1 August – Gregers Winther Wulfsberg Gram, jurist and politician (born 1846).
- 12 September – Olaf Hovdenak, long-distance runner (born 1891)
- 3 November – Olav Aukrust, poet and teacher (born 1883)
- 19 November – Torleiv Hannaas, philologist (born 1874)
- 14 December – Sigurd Jørgensen, gymnast and Olympic gold medallist (born 1887)

=== Full date unknown ===
- Mads Gram, physician (born 1875)
- Nils Otto Hesselberg, politician (born 1844)
- Christian Holtermann Knudsen, typographer, newspaper editor, publisher, trade unionist and politician (born 1845)
- Oscar Ludvig Stoud Platou, jurist and professor (born 1845)
- Valborg Seeberg, writer (born 1851)
