= Trygve =

- Pronunciation: TRIG-vee
- Gender: Male
- Language: Norwegian

Origin
- Origin: Old Norse
- Meaning: Trustworthy

Other names
- Related names: Tryggve, Tryggvi, Trigby

Trygve is a masculine given name most common in Norway. Trygve is derived from the Old Norse tryggr, meaning "true, trustworthy", cognate with Old English treowe, Old High German triuwe. Gothic has triggws. The Icelandic, Faroese and Old Norse form of the name is Tryggvi, e.g. Tryggve Olafsson.

There were 5,951 people with the forename Trygve in Norway in 2009, declining to 5,432 in November 2015.

The following people share the forename Trygve:

- Trygve Bendiksby (1907–1992), Norwegian judge
- Trygve Berge (born 1932), Norwegian Olympic downhill skier
- Trygve Bjørgo (1916–1997), Norwegian poet and educator
- Trygve Bornø (born 1942), Norwegian footballer
- Trygve Braarud (1903–1985), Norwegian botanist
- Trygve Bratteli (1910–1984), Norwegian Prime Minister
- Trygve Brodahl (1905–1996), Norwegian cross-country skier
- Trygve Brudevold (1920–2021), Norwegian bobsledder
- Trygve Bruvik (born 1952), Norwegian engineer
- Trygve Bull (1905–1999), Norwegian lecturer and politician
- Trygve Christoffer Busch (1920–1999), Norwegian war hero
- Trygve Bøyesen (1886–1963), Norwegian gymnast
- Trygve Dalseg (1898–1987), Norwegian marketing agent
- Trygve Dehli Laurantzon (1902–1975), Norwegian agronomist, newspaper editor and Minister of Agriculture
- Trygve Allister Diesen (born 1967), Norwegian film producer and director
- Trygve Gulbranssen (1894–1962), Norwegian novelist
- Trygve Goa (1925–2013), Norwegian printmaker
- Trygve Haavelmo (1911–1999), Norwegian economist and Nobel Prize laureate
- Trygve Haugeland (1914–1998), Norwegian politician
- Trygve Helgaker (born 1953), Norwegian professor
- Trygve Hoff (1895–1982), Norwegian businessman and magazine editor
- Trygve Daniel Holmedal (born 1999), Norwegian physicist
- Trygve Johannessen (born 1953), Norwegian footballer
- V. Trygve Jordahl (1898–1984), American bishop
- Trygve Knudsen (1897–1968), Norwegian philologist
- Trygve de Lange (1918–1981), Norwegian lawyer
- Trygve Lie (1896–1968), Norwegian politician and first United Nations Secretary General
- Trygve Moe (born 1927), Norwegian journalist
- Trygve Moe (1920–1998), Norwegian politician
- Trygve Nagell (1895–1988), Norwegian mathematician
- Trygve Nilsen (1893–1973), Norwegian politician
- Trygve Nygaard (born 1975), Norwegian footballer
- Trygve Olsen (1921–1979), Norwegian politician
- Trygve Owren (1912–1987), Norwegian politician
- Trygve Pedersen (1884–1967), Norwegian sailor
- Trygve Reenskaug (1930–2024), Norwegian computer scientist and professor
- Trygve Rovelstad (1903–1990), American sculptor
- Trygve Røed-Larsen (born 1939), Norwegian physicist
- Trygve Schjøtt (1882–1960), Norwegian sailor
- Trygve Seim, Norwegian jazz saxophonist
- Trygve Simonsen (1937–2011), Norwegian politician
- Trygve Stangeland (1934–2011), Norwegian businessman
- Trygve Stokstad (1902–1979), Norwegian boxer
- Trygve Utheim (1884–1952), Norwegian politician
- Trygve Slagsvold Vedum (born 1978), Norwegian politician
- Trygve Wiese (born 1985), Norwegian singer
- Trygve Wyller (born 1950), Norwegian theologian
