= Gulbrand =

Male given name

- Gender: Male

Origin
- Origin: Old Norse
- Meaning: "God's sword"
- Region of origin: Norway

Other names
- Related names: Gudbrand, Gullbrand; Gulbrandsen (a surname, meaning "son of Gulbrand")

Gulbrand is a Norwegian masculine given name. It is derived from the Old Norse Guðbrandr meaning "god's sword", from the elements guð ("god") and brandr ("sword"). It is a variant of the name Gudbrand.

People bearing the name Gulbrand include:

- Gulbrand Alhaug (born 1942), Norwegian onomastician and linguistics professor
- Gulbrand Hagen (1865–1919), Norwegian-born American was an American newspaper editor, writer and photographer
- Gulbrand Jensen (1885–), Norwegian judge
- Gulbrand Lunde (1901–1942), Norwegian politician and Nazi collaborator
- Gudbrand Østbye (1885–1972), Norwegian Army officer and historian
- Gulbrand Eriksen Tandberg (1775–1848), Norwegian politician
