= Gjerde =

Gjerde may refer to:

== People ==
- Barry Gjerde, Norwegian-born Canadian-Japanese voice actor
- Bjartmar Gjerde (1931–2009), Norwegian politician
- Eric Gjerde, American politician
- Gunn Berit Gjerde (born 1954), Norwegian politician
- John Gjerde (1929–2005), Norwegian politician
- Jon Gjerde (1953–2008), American historian
- Kristina Gjerde (1956 or 1957–2025), American lawyer and oceanographer
- Øyvind Gjerde (born 1977), Norwegian association football player
- Spike Gjerde, founder of Woodberry Kitchen, a New American restaurant in Baltimore, United States

== Places ==
- Gjerde, Norway, a village in Sande Municipality in Møre og Romsdal county, Norway
- Gjerde Church, a parish church in Etne Municipality in Vestland county, Norway
