= Schweigaard =

Schweigaard is a surname. Notable people with the surname include:

- Anton Martin Schweigaard (1808–1870), Norwegian educator, jurist, economist and politician
- Christian Homann Schweigaard (1838–1899), Norwegian politician
- Tellef Dahll Schweigaard (1806–1886), Norwegian politician
