= Breien =

Breien is a Norwegian surname. Notable people with the surname include:

- Anja Breien (1940–2026), Norwegian film director and screenwriter
- Bård Breien (born 1971), Norwegian film director
- Haakon Hasberg Breien (1864–1942), Norwegian judge
- Thor Breien (1899–1973), Norwegian judge

== See also ==
- Breien, North Dakota, United States
