= Andreas Endresen =

Andreas Endresen may refer to:

- Andreas Endresen (judge)
- Andreas Endresen (footballer)
