= Lars Anton Nicolai Larsen-Naur =

Norwegian politician (1841–1896)

Lars Anton Nicolai Larsen-Naur (8 March 1841 – 9 August 1896) was a Norwegian politician.

He was elected to the Norwegian Parliament in 1880 from the urban constituency Kragerø. He only served one term. At that time he worked as an attorney; he later became a district stipendiary magistrate (sorenskriver).

He married Marie Magdalene Schweigaard, daughter of Tellef Dahll Schweigaard, niece of leading politician Anton Martin Schweigaard and aunt of later Prime Minister Christian Homann Schweigaard.

He died in 1896.
