= Moxnes =

Moxnes is a Norwegian surname. Notable people with the surname include:

- Bjørnar Moxnes (born 1981), Norwegian politician
- Einar Hole Moxnes (1921–2006), Norwegian politician
- Halvor Moxnes (born 1944), Norwegian theologian
