= Ingvald =

Ingvald is a given name. Notable people with the name include:

- Hans Ingvald Hansen Ratvik (1883–1966), Norwegian politician for the Liberal Party
- Ingvald Anker Andersen (born 1866), Norwegian politician for the Conservative Party
- Ingvald Bjerke (1907–1990), Norwegian boxer who competed in the 1928 Summer Olympics
- Ingvald Eriksen (1884–1961), Danish gymnast who competed in the 1912 Summer Olympics
- Ingvald Falch (born 1963), Norwegian judge
- Ingvald Godal (1934–2019), Norwegian politician for the Centre Party and later the Conservative Party
- Ingvald Haugen (1894–1958), Norwegian labour union leader and politician for the Labour Party
- Ingvald Huseklepp (born 1949), former Norwegian footballer who played four seasons for SK Brann
- Ingvald Johan Ulveseth (born 1924), Norwegian politician for the Labour Party
- Ingvald Johannes Jaklin (1896–1966), Norwegian politician for the Labour Party
- Ingvald Svinsås-Lo (1897–1980), Norwegian politician for the Liberal Party
- Ingvald Tøndel (1887–1952), Norwegian politician for the Christian Democratic Party
