= Carl Dahl =

Carl or Karl Dahl may refer to:

- Carl Dahl (artist) (1812–1865), Danish marine painter
- Carl F. Dahl (1849–1902), German chemist
- Carl Adolph Dahl (1769–1819), Norwegian jurist and politician
- Carl Edvard Johan Dahl (1856–1929), New Zealand businessman
- Karl Frimann Dahl (1868–1953), Norwegian judge
- Friedrich Dahl (Karl Friedrich Theodor Dahl, 1856–1929), German zoologist
