= Asbjørn Kjønstad =

Norwegian professor (1943–2015)

Asbjørn Kjønstad (6 February 1943 – 14 February 2015) was a Norwegian professor of law.

== Career ==
He was born in Frol Municipality, studied under Anders Bratholm and graduated from the University of Oslo with the cand.jur. degree in 1970. He was a research fellow from 1972 to 1978, and took the dr.juris degree in 1978. He has been a professor at the University of Oslo since 1978. He was a guest scholar at Boston University from 1995 to 1996. As of his sixtieth birthday he had penned 35 books and 130 journal articles within the fields of national insurance law, health law, tort law and constitutional law. He chaired the committees that wrote the Norwegian Official Reports 1977:14, 1986:11, 1990:20, 1995:29, 2000:28 and 2004:3. He has been the editor of several law journals.

From 1983 to 1984 he headed the Institute of Private Law, and from 1986 to 1988 he was the dean of the Faculty of Law. He also holds an honorary degree from Lund University, and is a member of the Norwegian Academy of Science and Letters.

In 2009 he publicly supported Trygve Wyller's unsuccessful campaign to become rector of the University of Oslo. Later in 2009 Kjønstad ran for election (among university employees) for a place on the University of Oslo board of directors. He has previously held such a seat from 1986 to 1988 and 1999 to 2001.

He has also been a board member of the Anders Jahre Foundation for Scientific Research since 2003 and vice president of the European Institute of Social Security from 1993 to 1997. He died in 2015, aged 72.

=== Anti-smoking ===
Kjønstad was a member of the National Council on Smoking and Health, which was incorporated into the Norwegian Directorate for Health and Social Affairs in 2002. He has been referred to as the "father of the smoking ban" in Norway. He has stated that only 5% of his total work has pertained to anti-smoking.

=== Pensioner scandal ===
From 2008 to 2009 he chaired a special committee that looked into the so-called pensioner scandal. Retired members of the Norwegian Parliament, whose age and tenure in parliament equalled 75 years or more, were entitled to an especially lucrative pension, nicknamed a "golden pension". However, it was discovered that some former parliament members had a second income, which was larger than the pension itself. If this were the case, the persons in question were not entitled to the pension. When the committee delivered its report in January 2009, it singled out six former parliament members as suspicious cases: Gro Harlem Brundtland, Kjell Magne Bondevik, Magnus Stangeland, Anders Talleraas, Thor-Eirik Gulbrandsen and Tore Austad. In addition to the issue of pay and income, the committee found that some might have circumvented the 75-year rule by counting years where they, despite being elected as parliament members, actually served as government ministers. Government ministers in Norway may be recruited from Parliament, but while working in the executive branch he or she must leave Parliament, being replaced by a deputy (an element of the separation of powers principle). As such the years which is really spent as government minister can not count towards the specific parliamentary pension, according to Kjønstad.

As Kjønstad did not have a mandate to comment on individual cases of guilt, he chiefly blamed the pension regulatory board (composed of other members of parliament) as well as the legislators in general for creating and enforcing the law in a vague way. Already one week after the Kjønstad Committee delivered its report, the pension regulatory board announced its intent to outsource its mandate to the Norwegian Public Service Pension Fund.

The case was sent to the President of the Storting, and was to be investigated further by the Norwegian National Authority for the Investigation and Prosecution of Economic and Environmental Crime. Also, it was hinted that other people might be investigated. In 2009 the acquittance of Bondevik and Brundtland was announced.
