= David Mims =

David Mims may refer to:

- David Mims (wide receiver) (born 1970), American football wide receiver
- David Mims (offensive tackle) (born 1988), American football offensive tackle
