= Normann =

Normann is a surname. Notable people with the surname include:

- Adelsteen Normann (1848–1918), Norwegian painter
- Axel Otto Normann (1884–1962), Norwegian journalist, newspaper editor, theatre critic and theatre director
- Daniel Normann (born 2002), Norwegian footballer
- Emil Normann (1798–1881), Danish painter and naval officer
- Jeppe Normann (born 1951), Norwegian fencer
- Kristin Normann (born 1954), Norwegian judge and legal scholar
- Mathias Normann (born 1996), Norwegian footballer
- Richard Normann (1943–2003), Swedish management consultant
- Runar Normann (born 1978), Norwegian footballer
- Sigurd Johan Normann (1879–1939), Norwegian theologian and Lutheran bishop
- Wilhelm Normann (1870–1939), German chemist

== See also ==
- Normann Stadler (born 1973), German triathlete
- Mount Normann, mountain of South Georgia
- Normann Palace, building in Osijek, Croatia
- Norman (name)
