= Borgar Høgetveit Berg =

Norwegian judge

Justice of the Supreme Court of Norway
- Incumbent
- Assumed office 1 May 2017
- Monarch: Harald V

Personal details
- Born: April 9, 1970 (age 56) Ål, Buskerud, Norway
- Education: University of Oslo

Borgar Høgetveit Berg (born 9 April 1970) is a Norwegian judge, who has served as a Justice of the Supreme Court of Norway since May 2017.

== Early life ==
Berg was born on 9 April 1970 to Hallgrim Berg and Maria Høgetveit Berg. He grew up in Ål in Hallingdal, and went to high school at Hallingdal gymnasium and Monbulk secondary college in Melbourne, Australia.

In 1997, he took the civil service exam at the University of Oslo .

== Career ==
He worked in the Office of the Attorney General of Norway from 1998 to 2005, then as a partner in the law firm Thommessen. He was also acting judge in Borgarting Court of Appeal. He was appointed as a Supreme Court Justice in 2017.
