= Kjell Noreik =

Norwegian physician

- Born: 28 July 1929; Oslo, Norway
- Died: 1 January 2015 (aged 85)
- Occupation: Physician
- Relatives: Einar Staff (father-in-law)

Kjell Noreik (28 July 1929 – 1 January 2015) was a Norwegian physician. He was born in Oslo. He was appointed professor of social medicine at the University of Oslo from 1986 to 1999. He was frequently used as an expert forensic psychiatrist, and was a member of the Norwegian Board of Forensic Medicine. He resided at Slependen.
