= Gudbrand =

Gudbrand is a given name. Notable people with the given name include:

- Gudbrand Bøhn (1839–1906), Norwegian violinist, concertmaster, and music teacher
- Gudbrand Granum (1893–1984), Norwegian politician
- Gudbrand Gregersen de Saág (1824–1910), Norwegian-born Norwegian-Hungarian bridge engineer, architect and member of the Hungarian nobility
- Gudbrand Helenus Hartmann (1832–1900), Norwegian schoolteacher, rector and civil servant
- Gudbrand Østbye (1885–1972), Norwegian army officer and historian
- Gudbrand Skatteboe (1875–1965), Norwegian rifle shooter
- Gudbrand Bernhardsen Tandberg (1903–1949), Norwegian politician
