= Sigurd Lie =

Norwegian composer and conductor

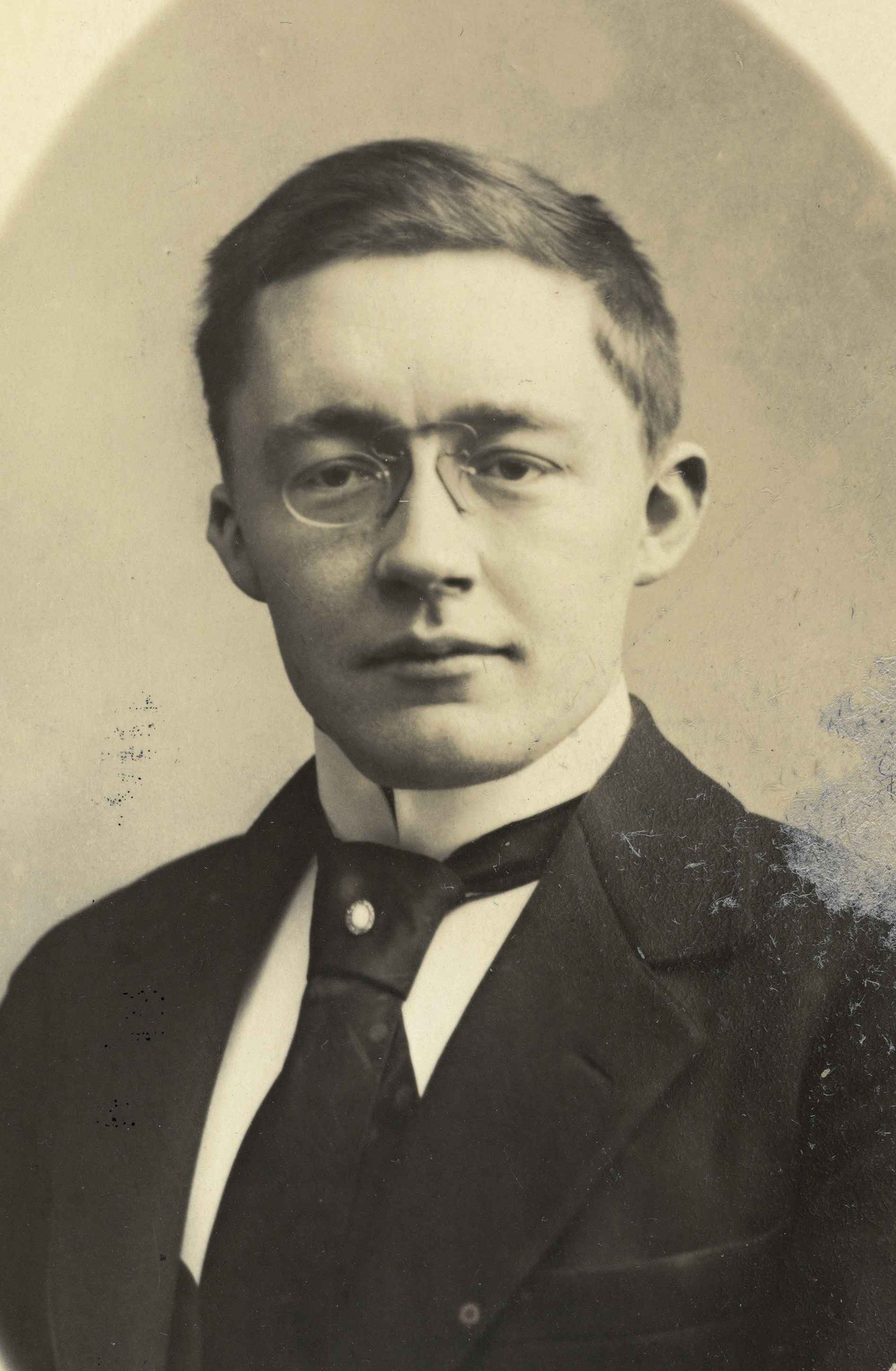
- Born: May 23, 1871; Drammen, Norway
- Died: September 30, 1904 (aged 33); Oslo, Norway
- Era: Romantic
- Parent(s): Fredrik Gill Lie, Amalie Konstanse Nielsen
- Relatives: Johan Herman Lie

Sigurd Lie (May 23, 1871 – September 30, 1904) was a Norwegian composer and conductor.

== Biography ==
Lie was born in Drammen. He grew up in Kristiansand, studied in Leipzig in the early 1890s, and then moved to Oslo to work as a conductor.

He died of tuberculosis in Oslo in 1904.

Lie is known for romances, and his best-known work is the romance Sne (Snow) with lyrics by Helge Rode. He also wrote other well-regarded Norwegian romances, including Hav (The Sea) and Det er vaar (It Is Spring), with lyrics by Idar Handagard. He also set poems by Vilhelm Krag to music.

== Works ==
- Konsertstykke (Concert Pieces), for violin and orchestra
- Norsk dans nr. 2 (Norwegian Dance no. 2)
- Wartburg, for bass-baritone and orchestra
- Symfoni i a-moll (Symphony in A minor), 1903
- Sne (Snow)

== Selected recordings ==
- Songs Lawo 2023
