= Gulbrandsen =

Gulbrandsen is a Norwegian language surname, meaning "son of Gulbrand". Notable people with the surname include:

- Aase Gulbrandsen (1927–2020), Norwegian artist
- Andreas Gulbrandsen (1906–1989), Norwegian chess player
- Bjørn Gulbrandsen (1927–1988), Norwegian ice hockey player
- Bjørn Oscar Gulbrandsen (1925–2011), Norwegian ice hockey player and yacht racer
- Christine Gulbrandsen (born 1985), singer and Norwegian entrant in the 2006 Eurovision Song Contest
- Fredrik Gulbrandsen (born 1992), Norwegian footballer
- Håkon Gulbrandsen (born 1969), Norwegian diplomat and politician for the Socialist Left Party
- Hans Martin Gulbrandsen (1914–1979), Norwegian sprint canoeist
- Ingrid Gulbrandsen (1899–1975), Norwegian figure skater
- Jan Gulbrandsen (1938–2007), Norwegian hurdler and sports official
- Kate Gulbrandsen (born 1965), Norwegian singer
- Niclas Gulbrandsen (1930–2013), Norwegian printmaker
- Parley Gulbrandsen (1889–1959), Norwegian missionary to China with the Norwegian Evangelical Mission
- Per Gulbrandsen (1897–1963), Norwegian rower who competed in the 1920 Summer Olympics
- Ragnhild Gulbrandsen (born 1977), retired Norwegian football striker from Trondheim
- Solveig Gulbrandsen (born 1981), Norwegian footballer from Oslo
- Thor-Eirik Gulbrandsen (1940–2014), Norwegian politician for the Labour Party

== See also ==
- Gulbrandsen Lake 0.5 miles (0.8 km) long lying north of Neumayer Glacier in South Georgia
- Gulbransen
- Guldbrandsen
