= Tellef Dahll Schweigaard =

Norwegian politician (1806–1886)

Tellef Dahll Schweigaard (7 August 1806 – 27 May 1886) was a Norwegian politician.

== Personal life ==
Schweigaard was born in Kragerø as the oldest son and second child of merchant Jørgen Fredrich Schweigaard (1771–1818) and his wife Johanne Marie Dahll (1785–1818). His paternal grandfather had immigrated to Norway from Holstein. He had one older sister and two younger brothers, one of whom was Anton Martin Schweigaard, a professor and ten-term member of the Norwegian Parliament. As their parents died early, the four Schweigaard children were raised by relatives.

Schweigaard married fellow Kragerø citizen Marie Margrethe Rømer (1814–1889). The couple had four children. Their only daughter Marie Magdalene married jurist and politician Lars Anton Nicolai Larsen-Naur. Their son Johan Elias married a daughter of Niels Anker Stang, became a senior physician, and was the grandfather of judge and politician Elisabeth Schweigaard Selmer. Through his brother Anton Martin, Tellef was also the uncle of later Prime Minister Christian Homann Schweigaard.

== Career ==
Tellef Dahll Schweigaard worked as a wholesaler and timber merchant.

He was elected to the Norwegian Parliament from Kragerø in 1880, and served one term. He had been mayor of Kragerø during the 1840s.

He died in 1886 in his hometown.
