= Olle Johan Eriksen =

Norwegian politician

Olle Johan Eriksen (12 August 1923 – 26 March 1999) was a Norwegian politician for the Conservative Party.

He was born in Haugesund.

Eriksen, who belonged to Rogaland, was never elected directly to the Norwegian Parliament but served as a deputy representative in the periods 1969–1973 and 1973–1977. During the first term he was brought in as a replacement representative for Egil Endresen, who became appointed to the Cabinet in 1970. Eriksen sat as a regular representative until March 1971, when the cabinet of which Endresen was a part was dissolved, allowing him to return to his seat in Parliament.

On the local level Eriksen held various positions in Haugesund municipal council between 1963 and 1987, as well as being a deputy member from 1991 to his death in 1999. He served as deputy mayor in 1966–1967 and 1975–1977, and mayor in 1970–1971, 1974–1975, 1978–1979 and 1979–1983. During most of this time he was also a member of Rogaland county council.

Outside politics he was a local businessman. He was also active in tennis.
