= Trygve Gulbranssen =

Norwegian novelist, businessman and journalist

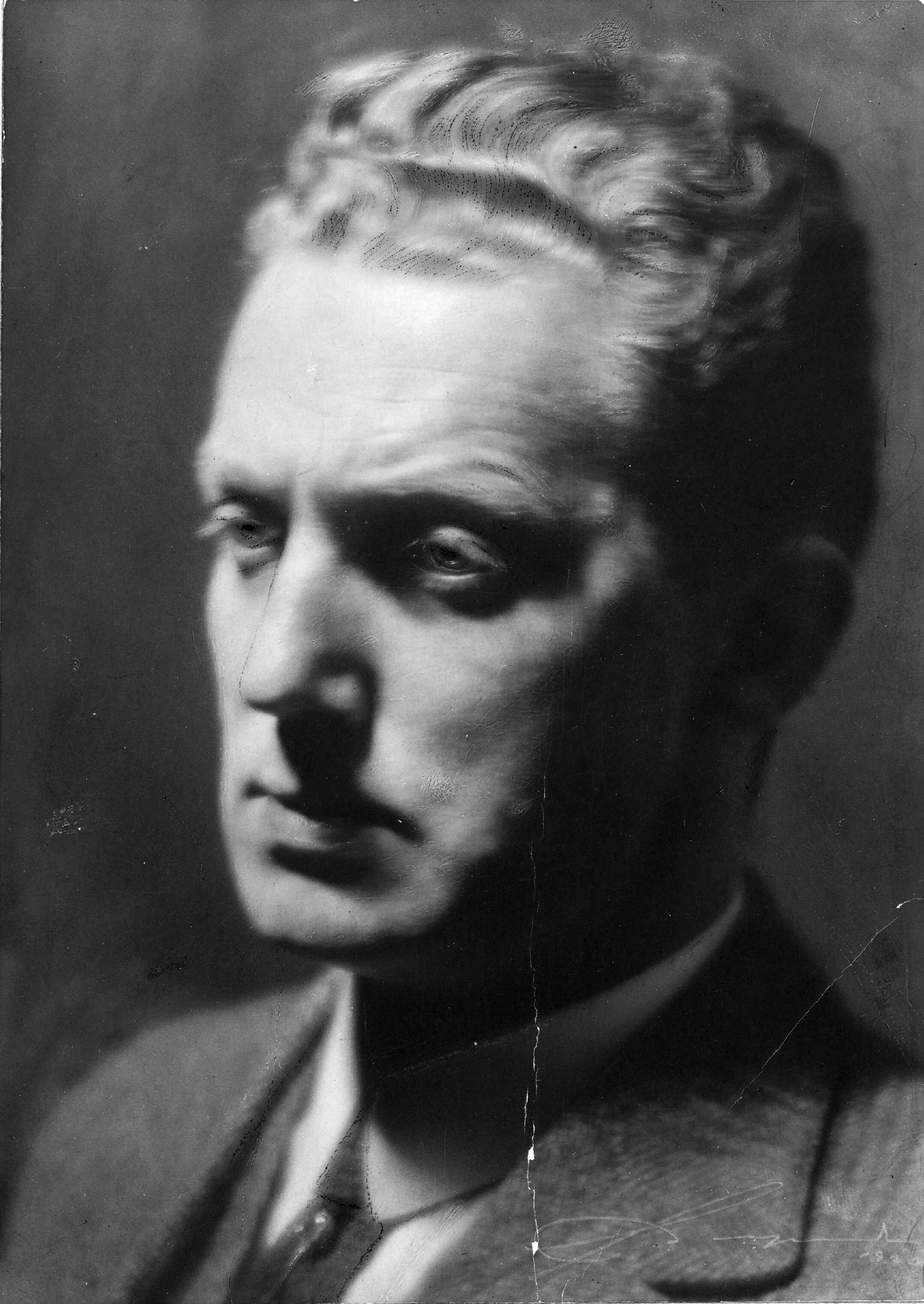
- Trygve Gulbranssen in 1920.
- Born: Trygve Emanuel Gulbranssen; 15 June 1894; Kristiania, Oslo, Norway
- Died: 10 October 1962 (aged 68); Eidsberg, Østfold, Norway
- Occupations: Author, businessman, journalist
- Spouse: Lilly Gulbranssen
- Relatives: Alette Gulbrandsen (mother); Christen Gulbrandsen (father)
- Writing career
- Language: Norwegian (Riksmål dialect)
- Genres: Romance, historical novels, family novels
- Notable work: Og bakom synger skogene (1933)

Trygve Emanuel Gulbranssen (baptized Trygve Emanuel Gulbrandsen; 15 June 1894 – 10 October 1962) was a Norwegian novelist, businessman and journalist.

Gulbranssen is best known for writing the Bjørndal Trilogy – Og bakom synger skogene (1933), published in English as Beyond Sing the Woods; and Det blåser fra Dauingfjell (1934) and Ingen vei går utenom (1935), collectively translated under the English title The Wind from the Mountains. His books were well received by critics and readers alike, and they have been translated into over 30 languages and sold more than 12 million copies. At one point prior to the outbreak of World War II, the popularity of the Trilogy made Gulbranssen the fourth-bestselling author worldwide, and the success of the American editions of his work secured for him the distinction of being the only Scandinavian author of fiction to be included in the prestigious List of Books Chosen for the White House – a collection of works of literature selected by U.S. publishers and presented to the White House in order to provide the president with a library of the very best in contemporary literature. His novels were later adapted for film, though he was disappointed with the results.

He was also well known as a sports journalist, writing primarily for the magazine Idrætsliv (Sports Life), which he produced together with Peder Christian Andersen and Einar Staff. He wrote many of his most famous and characteristic articles as a correspondent for Idrætsliv and Aftenposten during the Summer Olympics in the years between 1920 and 1936. He took a particular interest in track and field and sought to promote it as a sports manager for many years. He is also regarded – together with Nils Dahl – as the first person to have introduced orienteering to Norway.

Gulbranssen's primary profession was tobacconist; in association with his business partners he imported tobacco, cigars, cigarettes, pipes, and other items. The wholesale business he was a member of became the largest of its type in Norway under his leadership. He was a respected business man both inside and outside of Norway's borders, and he established many lifelong friendships during the course of his business trips around Europe.

In 1940, Gulbranssen moved with his family to a farm in Eidsberg, allowing him to realize his dream of being a farmer, and even though he did not personally participate in the daily chores, he invested a great deal of effort in the planning and management of the enterprise. Although he was a newcomer to the district, he did not isolate himself on the farm, and he maintained a good relationship with his neighbors. In 1955 he helped found the Mysen Rotary Club, where he actively participated as a charter member until his death in 1962.

== Background and childhood ==
Trygve Gulbranssen was born on Molstad Farm on Enebakk Road in the Vålerenga neighborhood of Kristiania (now Oslo) in 1894. His parents were Christen Gulbrandsen (1863–1943) and Alette Gulbrandsen, born Alette Antonsdatter Dahl (1863–1941). He had two older brothers, Birger and Alfred, as well as three younger sisters, Camilla, Ragnhild Margrethe and Tora Elvira.

His father Christen was the son of a farmer and master carpenter named Johan Gulbrandsen (1826–1871) and Petrine Pedersdatter Nøklebye (1828–1909), both of whom descended from farmer families in Trøgstad, Østfold County. His mother Alette grew up on Vestre Dahl Farm in Skogbygda in Frogn, Akershus County. Her father was a farmer and freighter captain named Johan Anton Jørgensen Strandengen (died 1899) and mother Bolette Olsdatter, born Skau. Through relatives on his mother's side, Gulbranssen was connected with the villages in the Follo district.

Christen Gulbrandsen, a carpenter and master builder, provided a good living for his family by buying and renovating townhouses before reselling them. A shortage of housing led to rising prices in Kristiania, but in 1899 the housing bubble burst in what has subsequently become known as the Kristiania Crash. Gulbrandsen had attempted to spread out the risk by placing his fortune in multiple banks and by purchasing Solberg Farm in Trøgstad, but this strategy failed as bank after bank closed its doors. The lack of new renovation projects and the loss of all property and savings came as a hard blow for him. He went on to try his hand as a real estate broker, but never fully recovered from the sudden change in his fortunes.

The family rapidly went from being relatively wealthy to struggling to make both ends meet. Paradoxically, they kept on moving to gradually "nicer" addresses as the economy deteriorated, which probably resulted from the family taking up residence in some of the father's renovation projects. On account of the father's business, there were many changes of residence, which caused the young Gulbranssen to lose contact with his friends and grow lonely. He wrote about this period of his life:

Moving to other parts of the city – the loss of schoolmates, the great loneliness precisely when friendship is the most important.

— Gulbranssen's personal notes.

Gulbranssen wrote this and many other notes about childhood with the intent of writing a book about the trials of growing up in Kristiania around 1900, but those plans never came to fruition.

In 1901 Gulbranssen lost his two-year-old sister Ragnhild Margrethe to dysentery, which she had contracted through contaminated well water.

When his maternal grandfather's farm was sold in 1906, Gulbranssen lost the only constant in his family's otherwise unpredictable city life. Both Gulbranssen and the other children took it hard. From an early age, he nurtured an interest for the agrarian life of Eastern Norway. But it wasn't until he came across the prayer book D. Jens Dinnysøn Jersins Tvende Opbyggelige Skrifter during one of the family's many moves that his interest in family history and the ideas that would mature in his later works really started to take hold. The prayer book, which had belonged to his great-great-grandfather Ole Christophersen Biørnebecks got him to ask his mother about their family origin. His mother was a good storyteller, and the stories she relayed were conscientiously noted by the young Gulbranssen, and later provided inspiration for many of the stories in his books.

== Into adolescence and out into the workforce ==
Gulbranssen had a tough childhood where the family often struggled to get enough money to put food on the table, and he went to work early on to help support his family. As a nine-year-old, he started out as a courier and ran errands, initially for private individuals and family, and later for haberdashers, butchers, cobblers, dairies, fishmongers, coal merchants, and many types of businesses and stores in Kristiania.

During an errand in 1906, he was supposed to deliver food from a delicatessen to Henrik Ibsen's home on Arbins Street. While he was there, he was asked whether he would like to see the deceased writer on his deathbed, but he became frightened and ran down the stairs.

In spite of his difficult work as a courier, Gulbranssen still did rather well in school. He attended Uranienborg School in Briskeby, worked hard earning good grades, did well on his examinations, and completed vocational school with top marks. The difficult life as a courier made it so that school work, and especially reading, became a haven allowing him to escape into his imagination. He seized every opportunity to read – surreptitiously under the desk at school, walking in the street, and while chopping wood or running errands.

== Drawing ==
Gulbranssen demonstrated a talent for drawing at an early age, and attended a number of drawing schools starting at age twelve. At age fifteen he produced a series of humorous drawings which he sent to a Danish joke magazine, securing for himself a small amount of supplementary income in the process. He enrolled in the Royal Norwegian Art and Handicraft School in the fall of 1909. This was a night school, where, with the exception of a hiatus in 1911, he continued his studies until 1916. In 1914, a drawing of a horse that he had made was selected for the 1914 Jubilee Exhibition.

Werenskiold inspired me to draw, simply draw.

— Gulbranssen's personal notes.

One of his professors once said to him while Gulbranssen was enlarging a drawing: "Take life in its true proportions; it is hard enough as it is. By reshaping it, one is apt to find small joys and large sorrows. Follow it exactly as it is, take hold of what is important, remain simple. I am showing you an essential truth: simplicity is life's greatest art." Gulbranssen found good use for this advice in the course of writing his books.

The famous artist Trygve M. Davidsen, who attended art school together with Gulbranssen, remarked that he had heard that Gulbranssen did not have a diploma: "That is strange; you got better grades than me!" Later, in February 1955, Gulbranssen was presented with a diploma that Davidsen had made with Gulbranssen's grades attested by school chancellor Jacob Tostrup Prytz. Gulbranssen had, among other things, received perfect or near-perfect marks in free-hand drawing.

== Steady work at the Excelsior glue factory ==
Since the family could not afford to send him on to secondary school, Gulbranssen was obliged to discontinue his formal education after seven years of elementary school. On 31 March 1908, just one month after graduating and barely fourteen years old, he was already employed as a clerk at the Excelsior Glue Factory, Inc. He started out as an assistant – a position he would continue to hold for the first five years.

While working at Excelsior, Gulbranssen took several courses and night schools, including a two-year business course at the Christiania Municipal School of Continuing Education for boys during the period 1910–1913, as well as additional courses in bookkeeping and English. He completed the classes with flying colors and received the highest marks in all subjects. He also got promoted to bookkeeper and cashier, continuing in these positions for the next three and a half years. In all, Gulbranssen worked eight years at Excelsior before leaving the company with the highest recommendations and without any absences for illness.

The time spent at Excelsior provided Gulbranssen with experience and life lessons in addition to all the knowledge he gained. The factory was engaged in the production of animal glue, where the raw materials were carcasses and animal skeletons, and there were several ugly accidents and tragedies that certainly made an impression on the young Trygve Gulbranssen. He spent most of the time in the office, but would often visit the shop floor to learn about the tiresome conditions of regular workers – an experience which may have been important later on when he sought to describe the toil of the very same kind of people in his novels.

== Daily life in Brugata No. 1 ==
The Gulbranssen family moved to Brugata No. 1 in the fall of 1908. Several farmers' markets were located in the area, and a majority of Kristiania's tanners and leather workers resided nearby. The place was hardly one of the best neighborhoods, but Gulbranssen had a good view from the apartment on the fifth floor and was able to observe life in the marketplace at Brugata No. 6 on the opposite side of the street. The sight of farmers coming into the city to buy and sell goods enabled him to paint a realistic picture of commerce between town and country in his fiction. He continued to live with the family in Brugata until he married in 1928.

Gulbranssen often visited the Deichman Library, but the family had to subscribe to the newly published books that the library did not have. They received one chapter at a time and bound the books themselves. Gulbranssen's sister was able to attend secondary school and stood for her examinations in 1913, the same year her brother was promoted to bookkeeper. This was possible because the family's financial situation had gradually improved as the boys grew up and entered the workforce. So as not to be a burden to her brothers, she chose not to study medicine (which one of her teachers had encouraged her to do), but instead took a position at an insurance company, where she remained until she married in 1921.

His brother Alfred died in 1913 at age 23. The loss of Alfred had a profound impact on the young Gulbranssen, to which he gave expression through compiling a memorial album containing all of the photographs taken of his brother.

Gulbranssen spent the evenings after long days at work conversing with his mother, entreating her to tell stories about life in the old days, which he carefully recorded. His notes would later serve as the basis for drafts of what became the Bjørndal Trilogy.

== From "Gulbrandsen" to "Gulbranssen" ==
Gulbranssen was born "Trygve Emanuel Gulbrandsen" and spelled his name "Gulbrandsen" in the usual manner with a "d," consisting of the given name "Gulbrand" and the suffix "-sen," which means "son". The name therefore means "son of Gulbrand", and most likely derives from one of Gulbranssen's paternal ancestors having carried the name Gulbrand. As was common around the turn of the twentieth century in Norway, the family elected to keep using this surname instead of continuing to take the father's given name as the surname for the next generation, as had previously been traditional in Norway. As a sign of his growing self-confidence, Gulbranssen undertook a name change in 1912 in order to assert his own identity, and continued thereafter to sign his name with double-"s" and no "d." This was an individual decision that Gulbranssen made after turning eighteen, and the rest of the family continued to write their name using the customary spelling. The name change has been carried on by Gulbranssen's two children.

== A family and home of his own ==
Trygve Gulbranssen married Lilly Ragna Haneborg on 30 November 1928 in Trinity Church in Oslo – the same church in which he had been confirmed in 1909. The reception was held at the Hotel Bristol. Lilly Haneborg came from Lie Farm in Øymark, Østfold, and was the daughter of landowner Petter Asbjørn Aarnes Haneborg (1873–1955) and Ragna Slang (1879–1965). At age 34, Gulbranssen moved out of his parents' residence and into a two-room apartment at Damplassen near Ullevål Hageby. The following spring, they moved on to a three-room apartment located at Tyrihans Road No. 22 in Vestre Aker, so as to have more room to raise a family. It was here that he began to gather all of the notes from his youth into three books. The work was time-consuming, and with time he resigned from all his commitments related to sports and journalism.

In 1930 the couple welcomed their firstborn, Ragna, and three years later their son Per was born. With two small children to take care of and a business to run, Gulbranssen had to use evenings and nights to write. This habit of working at night would last the rest of his life.

In 1935, as the sales of his books began to pick up, Gulbranssen moved his family to a villa at Eventyr Road No. 40 in Blindern. Here, Gulbranssen was finally able to realize the dream he had nurtured for many years of having his own workroom; a room that was locked and that no one else had access to.

== The outbreak of World War II ==
After the German invasion on 9 April 1940, Gulbranssen evacuated with his family to his father-in-law's farm at Lie in Marker, Norway. On 13 April they travelled on by horse to a hunting cabin by Frøne Lake before returning to Lie on 18 April. After the situation had stabilized down, they returned to Oslo. Gulbranssen sold his stake in the tobacco business as quickly as possible, realizing that the blockade accompanying the war would make it difficult to continue as a tobacconist.

== Purchasing a farm ==
Spending time on his grandfather's farm had been Gulbranssen's version of paradise as a child, and he had been looking for many years for a farmstead where he could recreate the life of his forefathers. Now he intensified his search, in the end settling on the estate at Hobøl in Eidsberg parish, where he moved his family during Christmas of 1940. Gulbranssen invested heavily in running a model farm – something his wealth of notes dealing with purchases and general management bear witness to. The farm was in need of renovation; particularly the farmhouse dating from 1910 was inadequate for the harsh winters. For this purpose, Gulbranssen hired architects and craftsmen, and employed them in overhauling practically every room in the house for quite some time. Even though Gulbranssen was active in the management of the farm, he never participated directly in the daily labor, so in order to implement all of the plans he had for Hobøl, he employed a welder, an agronomist, a housekeeper, a cook, a maid and two farmhands.

== Requests for help from many quarters ==
The Germans were on him like ants on an earthworm to get him on their side. But he shoved them off and stood firm like a rock.

— Eugenia Kielland.

Although he has settled in the country, the capital was nevertheless nearby. On several occasions he received letters, telephone calls, and visits from the German occupation authorities, who wanted him to appear at various public events, give lectures, or consent to having his books used to put the average German soldier in touch with the "Norwegian mindset," as they put it. He declined as best he could, although it became more difficult each time, and it became a source of strain for Gulbranssen, who had no patience for National Socialism.

In addition to these repeated inquiries, Gulbranssen also received a steady stream of appeals from individuals who were suffering under the Germans or who otherwise sought his help; Gulbranssen rendered what assistance he could. Among other things, he was asked for money, tobacco, and animals. He also aided the Home Front.

== Gulbranssen and Max Tau ==
In 1939 when the humanist and writer Max Tau fled from Nazi Germany to Norway with the help of Tore Hamsun, Trygve Gulbranssen was one of the first to open his home to him, inaugurating a lifelong friendship.

Trygve has been one of my best friends, and I am deeply moved.

— Max Tau in his letter of condolence to Lilly Gulbranssen, 11 October 1962.

After Tau became the first winner of the Peace Prize of the German Book Trade in 1950, he elected to use the prize money to endow a Peace Library. The Peace Library's first publication, The Future in Your Hands by A. den Doolaard and photographer Cas Oorthuys, came out in Norway and the Netherlands at the same time. But when the time came to take the first step out into the world – the publication of the German version – the process ground to a halt.

Tau contacted publisher after publisher without any luck, and finally turned to Gulbranssen for help. Gulbranssen took advantage of his fame and wrote a review of The Future in Your Hands. The review went over well in Germany and Tau was finally able to sign a contract with a German publisher.

== After the War ==
During the war, Gulbranssen lived under constant pressure from the authorities, as well as receiving requests for new books from his publisher, Aschehoug. In spite of all this, the lack of contact with the outside world and his foreign publishers, in addition to the absence of radio and uncensored newspapers, left him with a sense of isolation.

The liberation of the country on 8 May 1945 released a flood of emotions for Gulbranssen, which found expression among other places in his poem 17 May 1945. Since Gulbranssen was a farmer, he had at his disposal resources which were at that time in short supply, but he was willing to share, such as when he gave the Authors' Union an entire ox so that they could hold their planned peace and anniversary celebration.

After the war, Gulbranssen spent a great deal of time reestablishing contact with his publishers and transacting business with booksellers, from whom he had been cut off during the war. A number of issues needed to be worked out; for example instances where his novels had been printed abroad without his consent, and without any royalties having been paid. In order to resolve some of these issues, he took a trip with his daughter in 1950 where he paid visits to several of the European publishers.

In 1958, all of the farm's animals were sold at auction and Gulbranssen, like many other farmers in Østfold, was forced to rely entirely on the production of grain. Gulbranssen had worked hard to create a model farm, and the animals, which had been bred to be among the best in Eidsberg, included several prize-winning cows. The sense of disappointment over having to give up animal husbandry and milk production was considerable. Along with the herds, the sounds of life disappeared from the farm. Since one of the motivations for purchasing the farm in the first place had been to relive childhood memories from his grandfather's farm, it is no wonder that the day silence overtook the farm was one of the saddest in Gulbranssen's life.

Towards the end of his life, his health went into decline; his hearing began to fail, and he suffered from frequent nosebleeds. On 10 October 1962 Trygve Gulbranssen died in Eidsberg at 68 years of age. The attending physician diagnosed pneumonia and wanted to admit him to the hospital. Gulbranssen wanted to speak with his children first, and was given an injection of penicillin before he went to bed. His daughter Ragna was away, but his son Per came as quickly as possible, only to find his father dead in his bed.
