= Elisabeth Schweigaard Selmer =

Norwegian jurist and politician (1923–2009)

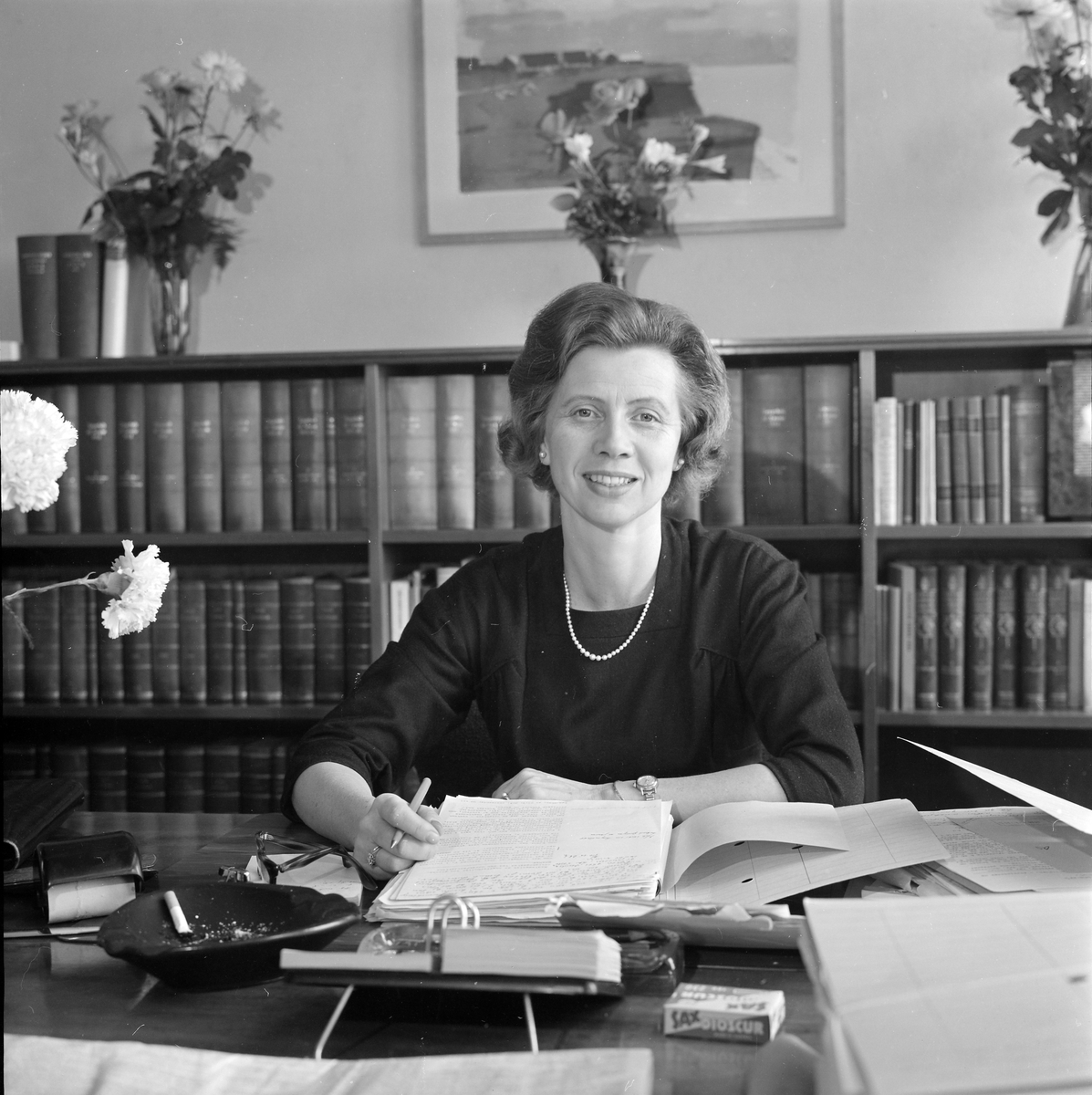
- Schweigaard Selmer in 1965

Supreme Court Justice of Norway
- In office 2 January 1971 – 5 January 1990
- Monarch: Olav V
- Prime Minister: Per Borten; Trygve Bratteli; Lars Korvald; Odvar Nordli; Gro Harlem Brundtland; Kåre Willoch; Jan P. Syse

Minister of Justice
- In office 12 October 1965 – 3 October 1970
- Prime Minister: Per Borten
- Preceded by: O. C. Gundersen
- Succeeded by: Egil Endresen

Personal details
- Born: Ragnhild Elisabeth Schweigaard; 18 October 1923 Kristiania, Norway
- Died: 18 June 2009 (aged 85)
- Party: Conservative
- Spouse: Knut S. Selmer
- Occupation: Jurist, politician

Elisabeth Schweigaard Selmer (born Ragnhild Elisabeth Schweigaard, 18 October 1923 – 18 June 2009) was a Norwegian jurist and politician for the Conservative Party.

During the Nazi occupation of Norway, Elisabeth Schweigaard worked with the Norwegian resistance movement "Hjemmefronten" against the Nazi collaborationist Quisling regime. Elisabeth was then just a teenager.

== Personal life ==
She was born in Kristiania to Niels Anker Stang Schweigaard (1884–1955) and his wife Betty Reimers (1886–1968). She had two older sisters, and was a great-granddaughter of Tellef Dahll Schweigaard and great-granduncle of Anton Martin Schweigaard. Born as Ragnhild Elisabeth Schweigaard, she married law professor Knut Sejersted Selmer. Through him she was a daughter-in-law of Ernst W. Selmer.

== Career ==
In 1941, she was expelled from Oslo Cathedral School because of anti-NS behaviour. She enrolled as a student in 1945 and graduated as cand.jur. in 1949. During the German occupation of Norway she had been involved in the Norwegian resistance, in illegal radio broadcasting. After graduation, she started working as a secretary in the Ministry of Justice and the Police, but then worked as an attorney from 1950 to 1955. She then returned to the Ministry of Justice, being promoted to assisting secretary in 1962. On the local political level, Selmer had been a member of Oslo city council during the term 1951–1955.

In 1965, she was appointed Minister of Justice and the Police as a part of the centre-right cabinet of Per Borten, the first woman to hold this position. She left the Minister of Justice position on 3 October 1970, when replaced by Egil Endresen. She then served as a Supreme Court Justice from 1971 to 1990, having been appointed in 1970.

Schweigaard Selmer was a member of many boards and councils. She was vice president of the Norse Federation from 1975 to 1978, and a long-time board member. She also sat on the boards of Oslo City Museum, the Norwegian Museum of Cultural History and Norway's Resistance Museum. A Riksmål proponent, she was a member of the Norwegian Academy for Language and Literature. She was proclaimed Commander of the Royal Norwegian Order of St. Olav in 1980, and has the Defence Medal 1940 – 1945.

Political offices
| Preceded by Oscar Christian Gundersen | Norwegian Minister of Justice and the Police; 1965–1970 | Succeeded by Egil Endresen |
