= Einar Staff =

Norwegian wholesaler and sports administrator

- Born: Einar Arthur Staff; 5 November 1889; Kristiania, Norway
- Died: 2 February 1972 (aged 82)
- Occupation: Wholesaler
- Relatives: Kjell Noreik (son-in-law)
- Awards: Order of St. Olav (1960)

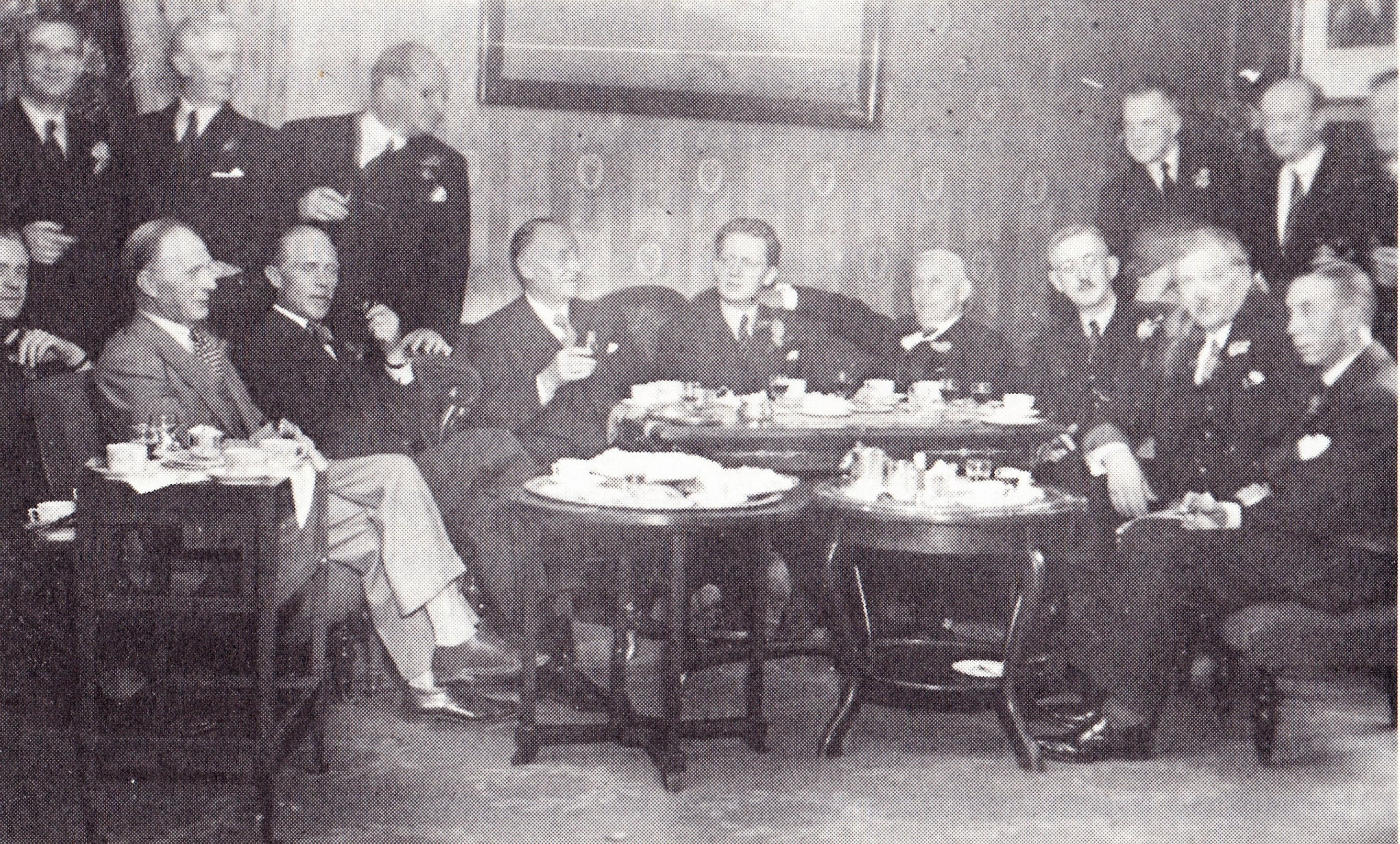
From Trygve Gulbranssen's 50th birthday party. Staff is second from left (standing).

Einar Arthur Staff (5 November 1889 – 2 February 1972) was a Norwegian wholesaler and sports administrator.

== Personal life ==
Staff was born in Kristiania to baker A.L. Staff and Ragnhild Olsen. He married Solveig Bruell in 1927. Their daughter Ragnhild Solveig was married to Kjell Noreik.

== Career ==
Staff started working in the grocery F.C. Balling in 1906, and became a partner in 1924. He took over as the sole owner of the company from 1925, and the company was renamed "Einar Staff".

He was also an active sports administrator, representing the club Oslo IL, of which he eventually became an honorary member. He was a co-founder and co-owner of the sports magazine Idrætsliv, together with P. Chr. Andersen and Trygve Gulbranssen. In 1940, during the German occupation of Norway, Staff was among the pioneers in the development of the Norwegian resistance movement. As chairman of the sports group, he was a board member of what has been called the "Oslo group", or "R-group", along with other people such as newspaper editor Christian A. R. Christensen, trade unionist Lars Evensen, physician Johannes Heimbeck, and military officer John Rognes. He was also part of the initial military resistance (Milorg), as the resistance movement eventually split into civil resistance (Sivorg), military intelligence (XU) and military resistance.

Staff chaired Norges Colonialgrosserer Forening from 1945 to 1951. He was a board member of Oslo Handelsstands Forening from 1945 to 1948, and chairman of the board from 1949 to 1952. He was a board member of the Norwegian Employers' Confederation, and board member of several companies. He was a member of the representative council of the newspaper Morgenbladet, and also of the insurance company Ørnen.

Staff was decorated as a Knight, First Class of the Order of St. Olav in 1960. He died on 2 February 1972.
