= Arne Ringnes =

Norwegian lawyer and judge (born 1955)

Arne Ringnes (born 28 April 1955) is a Norwegian lawyer and judge.

He was born in Oslo. He was hired in the Ministry of Justice in 1983, went on to serve as a deputy judge in Indre Follo District Court, then became junior solicitor in the law firm Thommessen in 1986. He became a partner in 1989, until he was appointed as Supreme Court Justice in 2014.
