= Guldbrandsen =

Guldbrandsen (literally the Son of the golden sword) is a common Norwegian surname. Notable people with the surname include:

- Christine Guldbrandsen (born 1985), Norwegian singer
- Kate Guldbrandsen (born 1965), Norwegian singer
- Peer Guldbrandsen (1912–1996), Danish screenwriter
- Valborg Guldbrandsen (1872–1949), Danish ballet dancer

== See also ==
- Gulbransen
- Gulbrandsen
