= Ethel Darline Guest =

African American artist

- Born: June 9 1929; Greensboro, North Carolina
- Died: May 15 2005
- Education: BFA – North Carolina A&T State University
- Known for: Painting

Ethel Darline Guest (born June 9, 1929) was an African American women artist. She taught at South Mecklenburg High School in Charlotte, North Carolina.

== Early life and education ==
Guest was born in Greensboro, North Carolina on June 9, 1929. Her two parents were custodian and craftsman Alfonzo Guest and schoolteacher Pauline Gardner. She attended received her BFA in North Carolina A&T State University, and also studied at Howard University in 1950, New York School of Interior Design in 1951, and Boston University in 1954.

== Work ==
Guest was primarily a painter who worked with oil and acrylic paint. Her work tends to be nonrepresentational; she usually focuses on the relationship between colors and textures, creating rhythm and harmony from geometric forms and shapes. Her work is inspired by and extremely influenced by nature and traveling, depicting the emotions she gets inside her work. She has specifically said:

"I create a visual symphony of related tones filled with form-soft geometric forms-planes, angles, hard-edge curves-quiet forms that stretch into space or curl up, spinning into [a total conception]-decorative forms that shout with bold colors, evenly applied," and "[m]y work reflects a tremendous love and fascination for nature, events relative to the times and a love of travel. Forms of all kinds inhabit my work reflecting moods and feelings expressing lyrics energy, a love of experiment and various influences brought back, impressions gained from travel, both national and international."

Three known paintings done by Guest include:

- Trip the Light Fantastic (oil on canvas, 40 x 40 inches, 1978)
- Fine Tuning (oil, 40 x 40 inches, date unknown)
- Broadway (oil & sand, 60 x 60 inches, date unknown)

=== Publications ===
Guest provided two illustrations for "No Boundaries at All", a work of fiction written by Laurel Trivelpiece published in the 6th volume of Red Clay Reader, attributed to her as E. D. Guest. Her two paintings, Fine Tuning and Broadway were reproduced in Artists U.S.A., 1974/75, attributed to her as Guest, Ethel D.. Her painting Trip the Light Fantastic was reproduced in the catalog Forever Free: Art by African-American Women 1862–1980. She was mentioned in the February 28 1978 issue of The A&T Register, a student newspaper at North Carolina Agricultural and Technical State University, as a notable figure of African American women artists alongside artists Glenda Wharton, Janice Davis, Lana Henderson, E. Rainey Heff, Barbara Chase-Riboud, Sharon E. Sutton, Mabel Bullock, and Mildred Thompson. In 1982, she compiled a collection of poetry written by students of Anita Stroud Foundation titled Golden Fruit From Little Black Seed.

==== Bibliography ====
- Liberman, Herbert, Artists U.S.A., 1974–75. New York, N.Y., Artists U.S.A., Inc., 1975
- American Contemporary Arts & Crafts Slide Library. Los Angeles, CA., 1974
- Nichols, Ward, "Wilks Art Guild." North Carolina Artists and Craftsmen. Wilks County, N.C., 1974
- Jones, Ione. Treewell (Vol. 10). Charlotte, N.C.: Johnson C. Smith University, 1971
- Grosswald, Roger R. Aim. (vol. 1, number 2). Charlotte, N.C. (illustration, drawing), p. 27, 1970
- Whisnant, Charlene. Red Clay Reader (vol. 6). Charlotte, N.C., 1969
- "Two Girls" (Lithograph) printed in Time magazine

== Awards and honors ==
- Who's Who of American Women, 1977–78; World's Who's Who of Women (International Biographical Center, Cambridge, England, 1978)
- Honorable Mention, 4th Annual "Biblical Interpretation d'Art-Charlotte Art League", Charlotte, N.C., 1974
- Certificate of Recognition for Outstanding Work in Charlotte, N.C.
- Charlotte O.I.C. Award, 1972
- Nominee for Gold Rose Award – "Salute to Outstanding Career Women Who Work" sponsored by the Career-Charlotte Central Association, 1971
- Works reproduced in Soviet Womans Magazine (Third Prize) Award and Der Bildener Kunst, 1965

== Exhibitions ==
- Wachovia Center, Charlotte, N.C., 1979
- An Affair of the Arts, Beck-South Park, 1979
- Contemporary Afro-American Art Exhibit, Spirit Square, Charlotte, N.C., 1979
- Art Exhibition, 501 Gallery, Spirit Square, Charlotte, N.C., 1978
- Fifteen Women, North Carolina A&T State University, Greensboro, N.C., 1978
- Extravaganza of the Arts, Top of the Tower, First Union National Bank, Charlotte, N.C., 1978
- 2nd Annual Collection Exhibition, H. Clinton Taylor Art Gallery, North Carolina A&T State University, 1978
- Afro-American Art Exhibition, Duke University, Durham, N.C. (one woman), 1976
- University of North Carolina, Chapel Hill, Durham, N.C. (one woman), 1975
- Fayetteville State University, Fayetteville, N.C. (one woman), 1975
- Metrolina National Bank (one woman) 1975
- Winston-Salem State University, Winston-Salem, N.C., 1974
- Art Exhibition, Greenville Center, arranged by Mint Museum of Art, Charlotte, N.C., 1974
- Charlotte Southern Christian Show, Merchandise Mart, Charlotte, N.C., 1974
- Benefit Reception, United Negro College Fund: North Carolina National Bank; Penthouse: Charlotte, N.C., 1973
- Assembly Inn, Montreat, N.C. (one woman) 1973
- Memorial United Presbyterian Church, Charlotte, N.C. (one woman) 1972
- Reflections: The Afro-American Artist, Benton Convention Center, Winston-Salem, N.C., 1972
- Religious Fine Arts Festival, Providence Baptist Church, Charlotte, N.C., 1972
- 20 Charlotte Artists, McDonald Art Gallery, Charlotte, N.C., 1971
- University of North Carolina, Chapel Hill, School of Public Health Annual Art Exhibition, Durham, N.C., 1971
- Mint Museum, 501 Gallery, Charlotte, N.C. (one woman), 1970
- Encounters, J.C. Smith University, Charlotte, N.C., 1970
- Charlotte Downtown Public Library, Charlotte, N.C. (one woman), 1969
- Barber–Scotia College, Concord, N.C. (one woman), 1968
- Johnson C. Smith University, Charlotte, N.C. (one woman) 1968
- Mechanics and Farmers Bank Annual Art Exhibition, Charlotte, N.C., 1966
- Charlotte-Mecklenburg Teachers Art Exhibition, Stratford House, N.C., 1965
- Albert Schweitzer Haus, Vienna, Austria, 1965
- University of Ghana, Legon, Ghana, 1965

== Collections ==
- North Carolina Agricultural and Technical State University, Greensboro, N.C.
- City National Bank, Charlotte, N.C.
- Covenant Presbyterian Church, Charlotte, N.C.
- Ebenezer Baptist Church, Greensboro, N.C.
- North Carolina National Bank, Charlotte, N.C.
- Spring Mills Incorporated, Fort Mill, S.C.
- Wachovia Bank, Charlotte, N.C.
