= Ole Mathias Sejersted =

Norwegian medical doctor

- Born: 6 June 1947 (age 79)
- Education: University of Oslo
- Occupation: medical doctor
- Parent: Fredrik Christian Steffens Sejersted
- Relatives: Francis Sejersted (brother)
- Awards: Order of St. Olav

Ole Mathias Sejersted (born 6 June 1947) is a Norwegian medical doctor, professor emeritus at the University of Oslo.

Sejersted graduated as cand.med. in 1973. He graduated as Dr. Med. from the University of Oslo in 1978. His research areas have included renal function, muscle fatigue and heart failure. As of 2017 and 2018 he is praeses of the Norwegian Academy of Science and Letters; he was elected member of the academy in 1998. He has also been vice dean of the Faculty of Medicine, University of Oslo.

He retired in 2017, at the age of 70, having chaired the Institute for Experimental Medical Research (Institutt for eksperimentell medisinsk forskning, IEMF) since 1991.

He was decorated Commander of the Order of St. Olav in 2018.
