= South Mecklenburg High School =

American public school in North Carolina

Location
- 8900 Park Road; Charlotte, North Carolina 28210; United States; 35°06′35″N 80°51′36″W

Information
- Other name: South Meck; South
- Type: Public
- Established: 1959 (67 years ago)
- School district: Charlotte-Mecklenburg Schools
- CEEB code: 343103
- Principal: Marc Angerer
- Staff: 180.61 (FTE)
- Enrollment: 3,244 (2023–2024)
- Student to teacher ratio: 17.96
- Campus: Suburban
- Colors: Red, black, white
- Athletics: NCHSAA 8A
- Athletics conference: Greater Charlotte 7A/8A
- Team name: Sabres
- Rivals: Myers Park High School, Charlotte Catholic High School
- Website: southmecklenburghs.cmsk12.org

South Mecklenburg High School is a public secondary school located in Charlotte, North Carolina. It is part of the Charlotte Mecklenburg School District. Locally it is known as "South Meck" (or simply just "South"). Its mascot is the Sabre and the school colors are red, black, and white. The attendance boundary includes nearby Pineville.

== Faculty ==
Several South Meck teachers and counselors hold National Board Certification, with many more working towards certification. The faculty teacher pages can be found on South Meck High School's web page.

== Athletics ==
The South Mecklenburg Sabres are a member of the North Carolina High School Athletic Association (NCHSAA) and are classified as an 8A school. It is a part of the Greater Charlotte 7A/8A Conference. South Mecklenburg has had many state championship teams, as well as individual state champion athletes in a variety of sports. Listed below are the different sports that South Mecklenburg offers for its students:

- Football
- Cross Country
- Cheerleading
- Soccer
- Field Hockey
- Swimming & Diving
- Basketball
- Tennis
- Indoor/Outdoor Track & Field
- Golf
- Lacrosse
- Volleyball
- Wrestling
- Baseball
- Softball
- Rugby

== Notable alumni ==
- Ricky Berens, former USA Olympic swim team member and 2x gold medalist in the 4×200 meter freestyle
- John Brannon, NFL cornerback
- Joy Cheek, WNBA player
- Stu Cole, former MLB player with the Kansas City Royals
- Carlos Crawford, former MLB player with the Philadelphia Phillies
- Bo Davidson, MLB player with the San Francisco Giants
- Walter Davis, 6x NBA All-Star and member of the gold medal-winning 1976 USA men's Olympic basketball team
- Grace Glenn, artistic gymnast
- Ethel Darline Guest, artist
- Anthony Hamilton, singer/songwriter and record producer
- Vani Hari, author, activist and food critique, who blogs as the Food Babe
- Wayne Hearn, professional tennis player
- John Hoogenakker, actor
- Bobby Jones, NBA Hall of Famer, 4x NBA All-Star and silver medalist with the 1972 USA men's Olympic basketball team
- Peter Joseph Jugis, fourth bishop of Roman Catholic Diocese of Charlotte
- Lew Massey, professional basketball player
- David Mims, former NFL offensive tackle
- Bryson Nesbit, college football tight end for the North Carolina Tar Heels
- Kristin Normann, legal scholar and judge in the Supreme Court of Norway
- Roman Phifer, former NFL linebacker and 3x Super Bowl champion with the New England Patriots
- Dan Shaver, racecar driver and entrepreneur
- Austin Yearwood, professional soccer player

== See also ==
- List of high schools in North Carolina
