= David Mims (offensive tackle) =

American football player (born 1988)

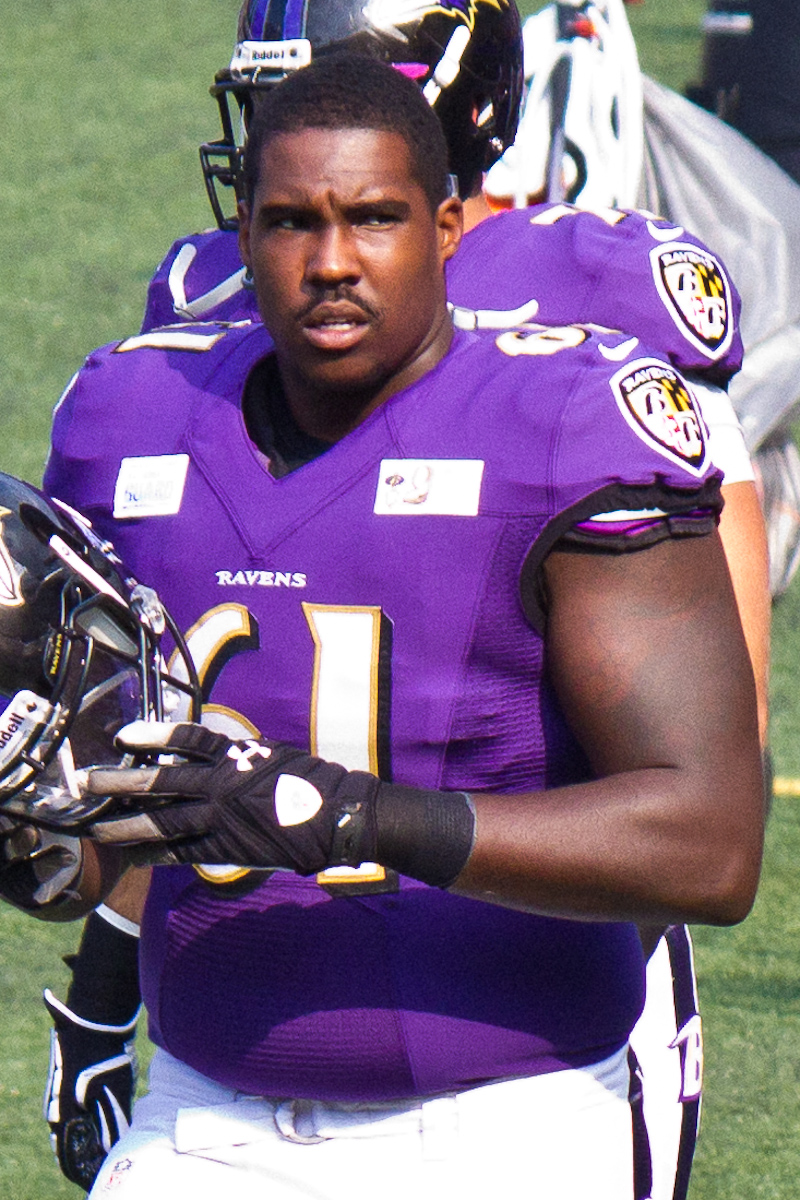
- Mims with the Baltimore Ravens in 2013

No. 70, 61
- Position: Offensive tackle

Personal information
- Born: May 18, 1988 (age 38); Charlotte, North Carolina, U.S.
- Listed height: 6 ft 8 in (2.03 m)
- Listed weight: 350 lb (159 kg)

Career information
- High school: South Mecklenburg (Charlotte, North Carolina)
- College: Virginia Union
- NFL draft: 2011: undrafted

Career history
- Kansas City Chiefs (2011−2012); Baltimore Ravens (2013−2014)*; Boston Brawlers (2014); Winnipeg Blue Bombers (2015)*
- * Offseason or practice squad member only

Awards and highlights
- FXFL All-Star (2014)

David Mims (born May 18, 1988) is an American former football offensive tackle. He was signed by the Kansas City Chiefs as an undrafted free agent in 2011. In college at Virginia Union in Richmond, Virginia, he was named to the CIAA All-Freshmen team, a 3× first-team All-CIAA, and a 2× All-American. Mims graduated from South Mecklenburg High School in Charlotte, North Carolina.

== Professional career ==
=== Pre-draft ===
Pre-draft measurables
Height	Weight	40-yard dash	10-yard split	20-yard split	20-yard shuttle	Three-cone drill	Vertical jump	Broad jump	Bench press
6 ft 8 1/4 in (2.04 m)	331 lb (150 kg)	5.32 s	1.90 s	3.07 s	4.80 s	8.10 s	26 in (0.66 m)	8 ft 6 in (2.59 m)	29 reps
All values from Pro Day workout on March 18.

A prospect for the 2011 NFL draft, Mims was projected to be drafted in the fifth round.

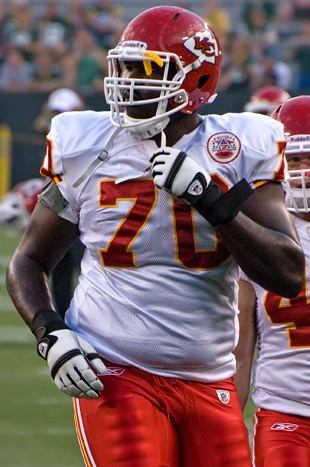
Mims with the Kansas City Chiefs in 2011

=== Kansas City Chiefs ===
Mims was signed by the Kansas City Chiefs as an undrafted free agent following the 2011 NFL draft on July 26, 2011. Mims was waived on September 3 during final roster cuts. After clearing waivers, he was signed to the Chiefs' practice squad on September 4. He was promoted to the active roster on November 29.

=== Baltimore Ravens ===
On February 6, 2013, Mims was signed to a reserve/future contract by the Baltimore Ravens. On August 25, 2013, he was waived by the Ravens.
