= Halvor Moxnes =

Norwegian theologian (born 1944)

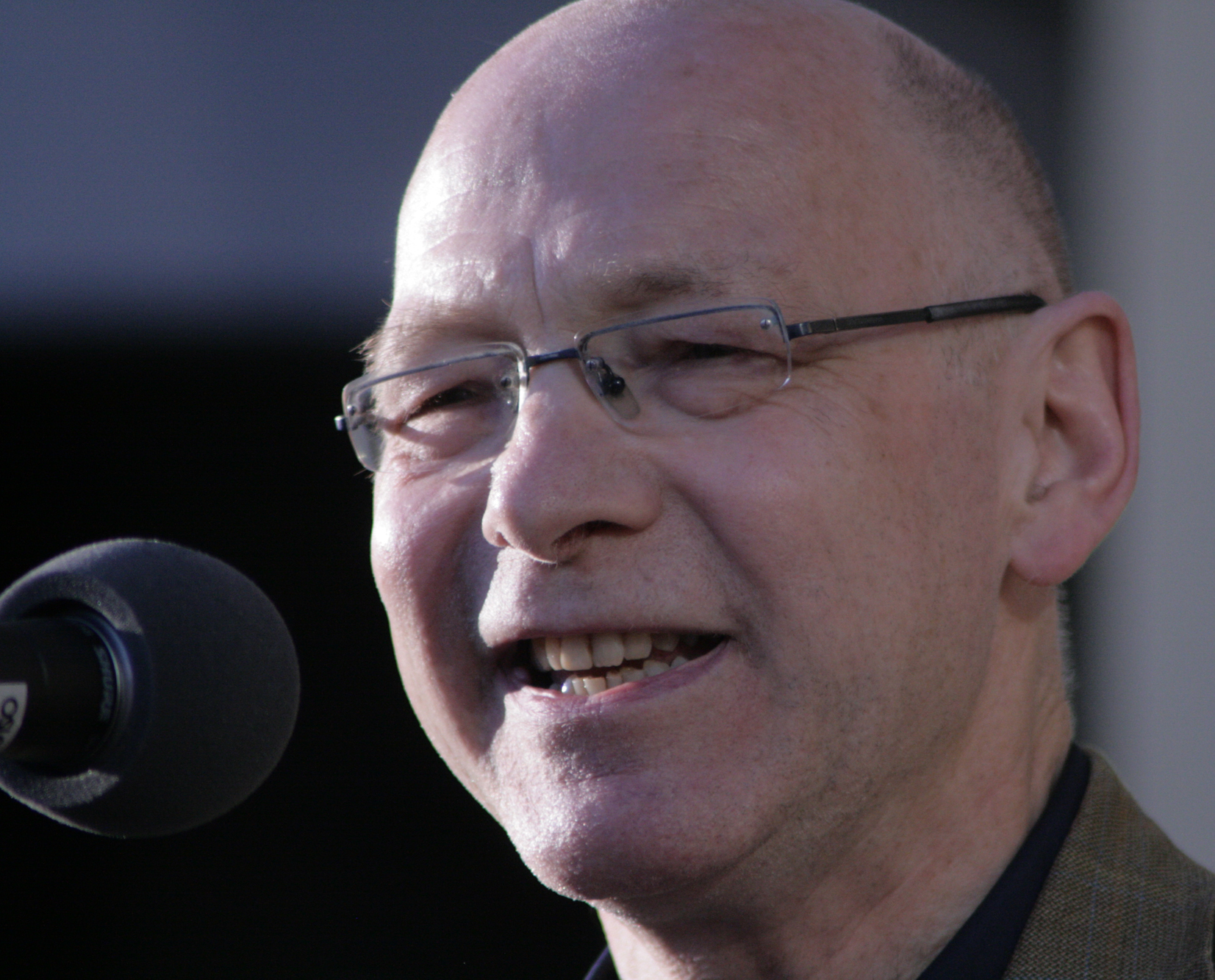
- Moxnes in 2009
- Born: 13 September 1944 (age 82); Stokke, Norway

Academic background
- Education: University of Oslo
- Thesis: Theology in Conflict (1977)
- Influences: W. D. Davies

Academic work
- Discipline: Theology
- Sub-discipline: New Testament studies
- Institutions: University of Oslo
- Influenced: Liv Ingeborg Lied

Halvor Moxnes (born 1944) is a Norwegian theologian.

He was born in Stokke on 13 September 1944. He received his Doctor of Theology degree in 1978 with the thesis Theology in Conflict: Studies in Paul's Understanding of God in Romans, and was appointed as a professor of the New Testament at the University of Oslo in 1984. In 2005 he received an honorary degree at the University of Copenhagen and he is also a member of the Norwegian Academy of Science and Letters. In 2006 ran for election as the dean of the Faculty of Theology, but lost to Trygve Wyller.
