= Gudbrand Granum =

Norwegian politician

Gudbrand Granum (19 September 1893 – 11 February 1984) was a Norwegian politician for the Communist Party.

He served as a deputy representative to the Parliament of Norway from Buskerud during the term 1945–1949. He hailed from Modum and had first been elected to the municipal council in 1922.
