= Gulbrand Alhaug =

Norwegian linguist

Gulbrand Alhaug (born July 2, 1942) is a Norwegian onomastician and linguistics professor emeritus at the University of Tromsø.

Alhaug studied at the University of Bergen. He has studied personal names in particular, and published the volume Norsk fornavnleksikon (Dictionary of Norwegian Given Names, 2011). In addition to Norwegian names, his onomastic studies have also included the Pomaks of Bulgaria.

== Selected bibliography ==
- En datamaskinell undersøkelse av suffiksvekslingen -ing/-ning i moderne norsk (A Computational Study of the Suffix Alternation -ing/-ning in Modern Norwegian; 1973)
- Heiderskrift til Nils Hallan på 65-årsdagen 13. desember 1991 (A Festschrift for Nisl Hallan on His Sixty-Fifth Birthday, December 13, 1991; 1991)
- Nordisk namnforskning 1997 (Nordic Onomastics 1997; 1998)
- Venneskrift til Gulbrand Alhaug (Papers in Honor of Gulbrand Alhaug; 2002)
- Fornamn i Noreg frå 1900 til 1975: med vekt på endringar i namnemønsteret (Given Names in Norway, 1900–1975: With an Emphasis on Changes in Name Patterns; 2004)
- Mot rikare mål å trå: festskrift til Tove Bull (Aspiring to Higher Things. A Festschrift for Tove Bull; 2005)
- 10 001 navn : norsk fornavnleksikon (10,001 Names: Dictionary of Norwegian Given Names; 2001)
