= Otto Helgesen =

Norwegian judge

- Born: 4 July 1898; Fredrikstad, Norway
- Died: 19 June 1973 (aged 74)
- Occupation: Judge

Otto Helgesen (4 July 1898 – 19 June 1973) was a Norwegian judge.

He was born in Fredrikstad to Helge Helgesen and Karen Elisabeth Nielsen. He graduated as cand.jur. in 1920, and was named as a Supreme Court Justice from 1950 to 1968. He was a member of the Labour Court of Norway from 1960, and chaired Prisrådet from 1962. He was decorated as a Commander of the Order of St. Olav. He died in 1973.
