= Johan Herman Thoresen =

Norwegian judge

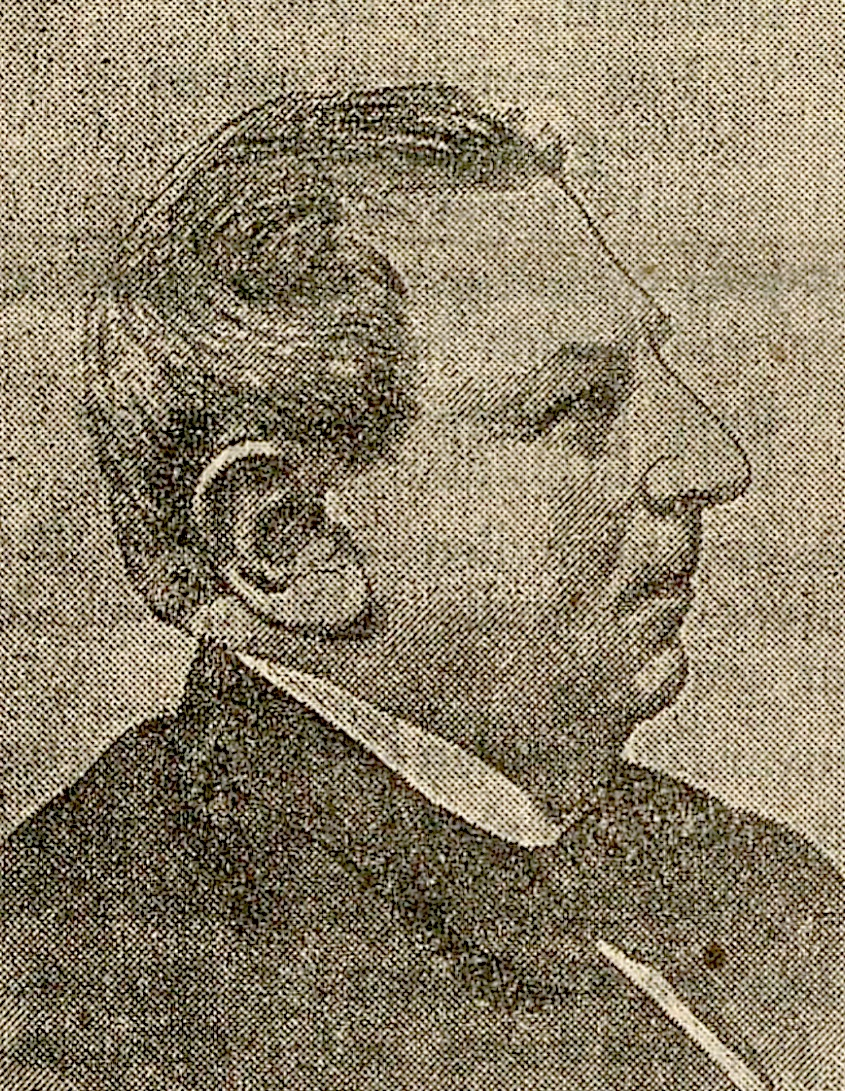
- Born: 14 July 1832; Herøy, Norway
- Died: 28 January 1914 (aged 81)
- Occupation: Judge

Johan Herman Thoresen (14 July 1832 – 28 January 1914) was a Norwegian judge.

== Biography ==
He was born in Herøy to priest Hans Konrad Thoresen and Sara Margrethe Daae. He graduated as cand.jur. in 1854, and was named as a Supreme Court Justice from 1884.

He was decorated Knight, First Class of the Order of St. Olav in 1892, and Commander in 1897.
