= Egil Endresen =

Norwegian judge and politician

Minister of Justice
- In office 3 October 1970 – 17 March 1971
- Prime Minister: Per Borten
- Preceded by: Elisabeth S. Selmer
- Succeeded by: Oddvar Berrefjord

Member of the Norwegian Parliament
- In office 1 October 1965 – 30 September 1973
- Constituency: Rogaland

Personal details
- Born: 28 April 1920 Stavanger, Rogaland, Norway
- Died: 10 May 1992 (aged 72)
- Party: Conservative

Egil Endresen (28 April 1920 – 10 May 1992) was a Norwegian judge and politician for the Conservative Party.

He was born in Stavanger as a son of Gustav Adolf Emil Endresen (1882–1955) and Alida Anda (1883–1974). He took his examen artium 1940, commerce school in 1941 and also took military training as a captain. He studied law at the University of Oslo, and graduated with the cand.jur. degree in 1947. He worked as a secretary in the Norwegian Ministry of Justice and the Police from 1947 to 1948, then as a deputy judge in Ryfylke District Court in and Jæren District Court from 1949 to 1950. He was an attorney in Stavanger from 1950 to 1963, from 1960 a barrister with access to work with Supreme Court cases. From 1962 to 1965 he worked with tourism in Rogaland.

Endresen was a member of the executive committee of Stavanger city council from 1955 to 1963. He was elected to the Parliament of Norway from Rogaland in 1965, and was re-elected on one occasion in 1969. His second term was cut short as he on 3 October 1970 was appointed Minister of Justice and the Police during the centre-right Borten's Cabinet, replacing Elisabeth Schweigaard Selmer. He held the position until Borten's Cabinet fell in 1971. Olle Johan Eriksen took his seat in Parliament from 1970 to 1971. Endresen finished his second term in 1973, and was a member of the Standing Committee on Justice in both terms.

From 1972 to 1977 Endresen served as the district stipendiary magistrate of Holt. He then served as a Supreme Court Justice from 1977 to 1988.

He was decorated as a Commander of the Royal Norwegian Order of St. Olav in 1987. His son Clement Endresen became a Supreme Court Justice too.

Political offices
Preceded by Elisabeth Schweigaard Selmer	Norwegian Minister of Justice and the Police; 1970–1971	Succeeded by Oddvar Berrefjord
