= Per Lykke Anker =

Norwegian judge

- Born: 10 October 1900; Kristiania, Norway
- Died: 6 October 1983 (aged 82)
- Occupation: Judge

Per Lykke Anker (10 October 1900 – 10 Jun 1983) was a Norwegian judge.

He was born in Kristiania to engineer Christian August Anker (1869–1959) and Marie Louise Lykke. He graduated as cand.jur. in 1923, and was named as a Supreme Court Justice from 1962 to 1970. He was a board member of the Norwegian Trekking Association from 1945 to 1951.
