= Asmund Eirik Soelseth =

Norwegian judge (1886–1975)

- Born: 22 August 1886; Vadsø, Norway
- Died: 31 January 1975 (aged 88)
- Occupation: Judge
- Awards: Order of St. Olav

Asmund Eirik Soelseth (22 August 1886 – 31 January 1975) was a Norwegian judge.

He was born in Vadsø to Svend Soelseth and Anna Erika Bakke. He graduated as cand.jur. in 1910, and was named as a Supreme Court Justice from 1946 to 1956. He was decorated Commander of the Order of St. Olav in 1953.
