= Thorstein Rittun =

Norwegian painter, illustrator and ceramist (1929–2018)

- Born: 16 February 1929; Skien, Norway
- Died: 6 April 2018 (aged 89); Oslo
- Education: Norwegian National Academy of Fine Arts
- Occupations: Painter, illustrator and ceramist

Thorstein Rittun (16 February 1929 – 6 April 2018) was a Norwegian painter, illustrator and ceramist.

== Personal life ==
Rittun was born in Skien on 9 January 1937, a son of Claus Christoffer Rittun (or Olaus Christoffer Rittun) and Alfhild Bergliot Lodtz. In 1958 he married painter and textile artist Bea Rittun, née Berit Aarseth.

== Career ==
Rittun studied at the Norwegian National Academy of Fine Arts from 1947 to 1950, under Per Krohg.

He made his exhibition debut at Høstutstillingen in 1949, and had his first separate exhibition in Skien in 1955. His works are typically colorful motives, decorative patterns, fantasy landscapes, people, nature, children and music.

He is represented at the National Museum of Norway with the painting Ut av skogen (1968). Other paintings are Kongsdøtrene i berget det blå (1980), Gullfuglen (1983), and Sommer (1988). He illustrated books by Gordon Hølmebakk, Åse-Marie Nesse, Tor Åge Bringsværd and Annie Riis, and collections of Norwegian Folktales. He also contributed with ceramic reliefs to decoration of public places or buildings, including churches, ships, oil platforms, schools and office buildings.

Rittun died in Oslo on 6 April 2018, at the age of 89.
