= Clement Endresen =

Norwegian judge

Clement Endresen (born 8 November 1949) is a Norwegian judge.

He was born in Stavanger, Norway as the son of politician and judge Egil Endresen. He graduated as cand.jur. from the University of Oslo in 1974, and then worked as lecturer there from 1975 to 1977. He then worked as an attorney in Sandnes District Court from 1977, in the Office of the Attorney General of Norway from 1979 and in a law firm from 1980 to 2006. He was a Supreme Court Justice from 2006 to 2019.
