= Johan Herman Lie =

Norwegian judge

Johan Herman Lie (1869 – 1951) was a Norwegian judge.

He was a son of Fredrik Gill Lie (1833–1899), and brother of composer Sigurd Lie, nephew of Sophus Lie, and first cousin of Johan Herman Lie Vogt and Ragnar Vogt.

He took the cand.jur. degree in 1892 and the lawyer's license in 1902. He was a judge in Oslo City Court from 1901 to 1918, when he was appointed as a Supreme Court Justice.
