= Anton Cathinco Stub Holmboe =

Anton Cathinco Stub Holmboe (born 31 January 1892 in Christiania, died 15 March 1980) was a Norwegian jurist and supreme court justice in the Supreme Court of Norway. He was Grand Master of the Norwegian Order of Freemasons from 1962 to 1969.

As a law student, he was chairman of the Conservative Students' Association. He graduated with the cand.jur. degree at the Royal Frederick University in 1914 and became a supreme court advocate (a barrister with the right to appear before the Supreme Court) in 1925. He worked as a secretary in the legal department of the Ministry of Justice from 1917 to 1922 and at the Wine Monopoly from 1922 to 1926. From 1926 he was employed at Den norske Creditbank as a legal adviser. He was appointed by the King-in-Council as a supreme court justice in 1945. He retired as supreme court justice in 1962. He also wrote articles on legal topics, notably on negotiable instrument and cheque law.

He was a member of the Norwegian Academy of Science and Letters and an honorary member of the Danish Order of Freemasons, of the Icelandic Order of Freemasons and of the Grand Landlodge of the Freemasons of Germany.

== Honours ==
- Knight of the Order of Charles XIII
- Commander of the Order of the Polar Star
- Commander of the Order of St. Olav (1955)
- Commander of the Order of the White Rose of Finland
