= Fredrik Christian Steffens Sejersted =

- Born: 5 May 1901; Kristiania, Norway
- Occupation: Judge
- Children: Francis Sejersted; Ole Mathias Sejersted
- Parent: Nils Johannes Sejersted
- Awards: Order of St. Olav; Defence Medal 1940–1945

Fredrik Christian Steffens Sejersted (5 May 1901 – 1987) was a Norwegian jurist.

He was born in Kristiania to Colonel Nils Johannes Sejersted and Anna Steffens. He graduated as cand.jur.

In 1923. From 1929 to 1969 he was appointed jurist for Norsk Hydro. He served as acting Supreme Court Justice from 1946 to 1947. He was decorated Knight, First Class of the Order of St. Olav in 1971.
