= Marius Cathrinus Backer =

Norwegian judge

- Born: 25 June 1866; Drammen, Norway
- Died: 19 February 1960
- Occupation: Judge

Marius Cathrinus Backer (25 June 1866 – 19 February 1960) was a Norwegian judge.

He was born in Drammen to timber trader Lars Zacharias Backer and Hanna Schwartz. He graduated as cand.jur. in 1888, and was named as a Supreme Court Justice from 1911 to 1936. He was decorated Knight, First Class of the Order of St. Olav in 1929.
