= Gunnar Block Watne =

- Born: 8 July 1929; Sandnes, Norway
- Died: 28 September 2016 (aged 87)
- Occupations: Engineer and businessperson

Gunnar Block Watne (8 July 1929 – 28 September 2016) was a Norwegian engineer and businessperson.

He was born in Sandnes, a son of timber trader Gabriel Block Watne and Randi Øglænd. Block Watne was a pioneer in introducing prefabricated houses in Norway. In the early 1980s his company Block Watne was the largest house building contractor in Scandinavia.
