= Gjerde Church =

Church in Vestland, Norway

- Gjerde kyrkje
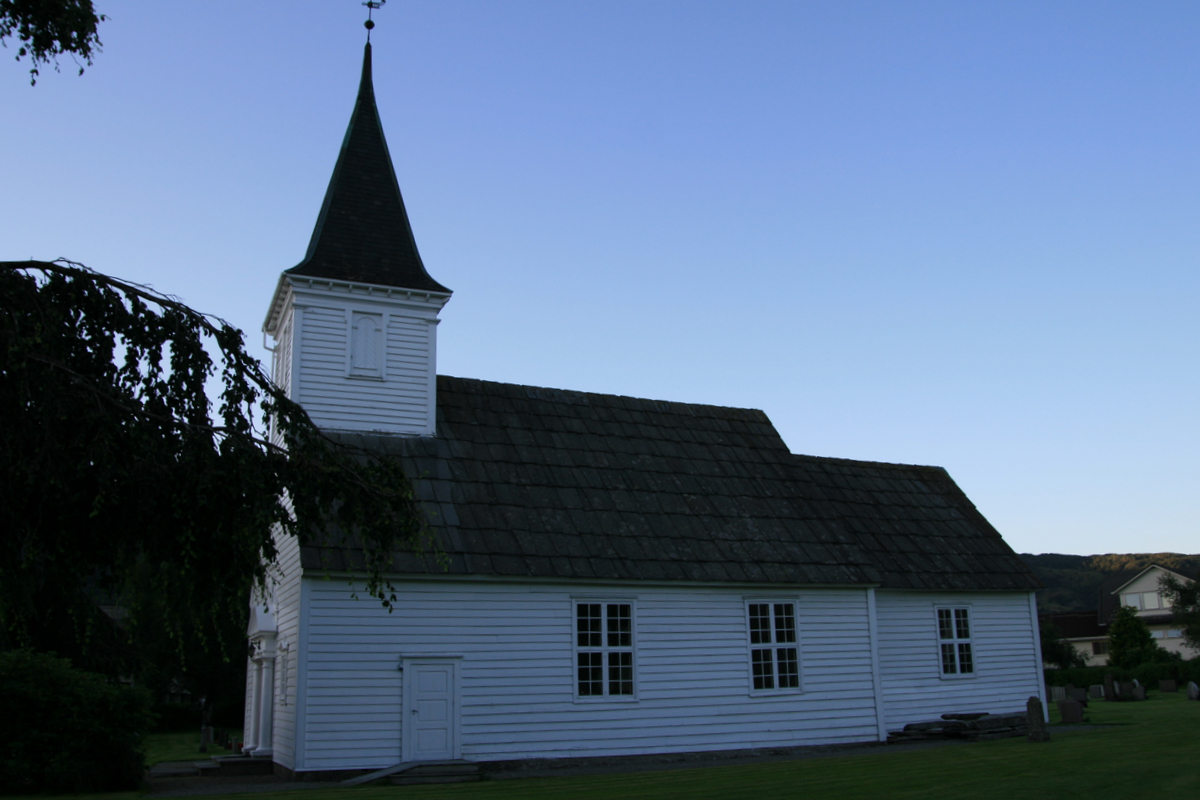
- View of the church
- Gjerde Church
- 59°39′51″N 5°56′05″E
- Location: Etne Municipality, Vestland
- Country: Norway
- Denomination: Church of Norway
- Previous denomination: Catholic Church
- Churchmanship: Evangelical Lutheran

History
- Status: Parish church
- Founded: 13th century
- Consecrated: 1676

Architecture
- Functional status: Active
- Architectural type: Long church
- Completed: 1676 (350 years ago)

Specifications
- Capacity: 250
- Materials: Wood

Administration
- Diocese: Bjørgvin bispedømme
- Deanery: Sunnhordland prosti
- Parish: Etne
- Norwegian Cultural Heritage Site
- Type: Church
- Status: Automatically protected
- ID: 84250

Gjerde Church (Norwegian: Gjerde kyrkje) is a parish church of the Church of Norway in Etne Municipality in Vestland county, Norway. It is located in the Etnesjøen, just south of the village centre. It is one of the churches for the Etne parish which is part of the Sunnhordland prosti (deanery) in the Diocese of Bjørgvin. The white, wooden church was built in a long church design in 1676 using plans drawn up by an unknown architect. The church seats about 250 people.

== History ==
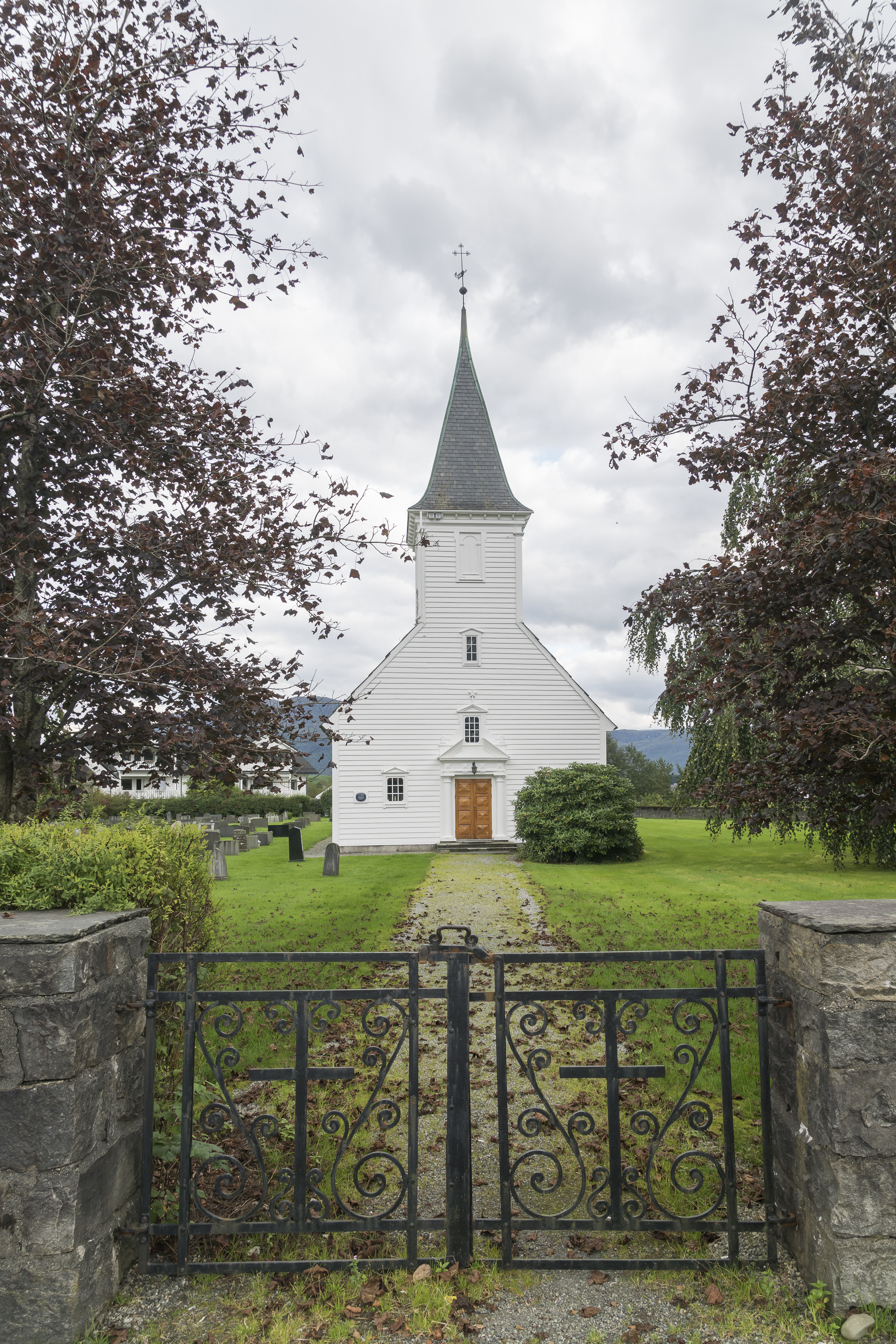
View of the church

The earliest existing historical records of the church date back to the year 1288, but it was built some time before that. That church was most likely a wooden stave church that was likely built during the 13th century. The building had a choir on the east end of the nave and a tower on the west end. In 1673, the church was badly damaged in a storm, and since it had been in poor condition for some time, it was decided to tear down the building.

Instead of rebuilding, the parish purchased another church that was moved here from Sandviken in Bergen. The church from Bergen had been built in the 1500s. The other church was moved to Gjerde and rebuilt on the church site in 1676 where has been in use since that time. The lead builders for this reconstruction were Ola Bysheim and Ola Nedre Eikanger. This white, wooden church seats about 250 people. The church bell dates back to 1315. The bell is inscribed (in Norwegian): "Jakob made me 1315. Pastor Erling had me made."

In 1814, this church served as an election church (Norwegian: valgkirke). Together with more than 300 other parish churches across Norway, it was a polling station for elections to the 1814 Norwegian Constituent Assembly which wrote the Constitution of Norway. This was Norway's first national elections. Each church parish was a constituency that elected people called "electors" who later met together in each county to elect the representatives for the assembly that was to meet at Eidsvoll Manor later that year.

In 1930, the old tower was torn down and a new church porch and tower was built in its place. In 1956, the church underwent an extensive restoration under the direction of the architect K. Bjerknes.

== See also ==
- List of churches in Bjørgvin
