= Haakon Hasberg Breien =

Norwegian judge

- Born: 8 July 1864; Jevnaker, Norway
- Died: 21 October 1942 (aged 78)
- Occupation: Judge
- Children: Thor Breien

Haakon Hasberg Breien (8 July 1864 – 21 October 1942) was a Norwegian judge.

He was born in Jevnaker to Michael Hammer Breien and Johanne Borch. He graduated as cand.jur. in 1885, and was named as a Supreme Court Justice from 1921.
