= Andreas Endresen (judge) =

Norwegian judge

Andreas Endresen (1908–1985) was a Norwegian judge.

He grew up in Stavanger, and took the cand.jur. degree in 1932. After some time as a junior solicitor in his hometown he was employed in the Ministry of Justice. He was a secretary when World War II came to Norway, and conducted secret anti-Nazi work for the Norwegian Home Front (Hjemmefronten). At the war's end in 1945 he was promoted to assistant secretary. He worked with the legal purge in Norway after World War II.

Endresen was later a presiding judge in Eidsivating Court of Appeal from 1952 to 1955 and deputy under-secretary of state in the Ministry of Justice from 1955 to 1959. From 1959 to his retirement on 31 December 1978 he served as a Supreme Court Justice. He died in 1985.
