= Gulbrand Jensen =

Norwegian judge

- Born: 24 September 1885; Hamar, Norway
- Died: 9 January 1979 (aged 93)
- Occupation: Judge
- Awards: Order of St. Olav

Gulbrand Jensen (24 September 1885 – 9 January 1979) was a Norwegian judge.

He was born in Hamar to merchant Gulbrand Jensen and Oline Jølstad. He graduated as cand.jur. in 1908. He was appointed as district stipendiary magistrate (sorenskriver) in Tønsberg from 1945 to 1956, and served as acting Supreme Court Justice in 1947 and in 1954. He was decorated Knight, First Class of the Order of St. Olav in 1956.
