= Tore Sinding-Larsen =

Norwegian judge (1929–2013)

Tore Sinding-Larsen (22 October 1929 – 8 September 2013) was a Norwegian judge.

== Life and career ==
Sinding-Larsen was born in Bergen. He worked under the Norwegian Parliamentary Ombudsman from 1963, and was a Supreme Court Justice from 1977 to 1997.
