= Thommessen =

Norwegian law firm

Thommessen (formerly Thommessen Krefting Greve Lund) is one of the largest law firms in Norway and mainly deals with business law. The firm has over 300 employees, with more than 200 lawyers and legal assistants and offices in Oslo, Bergen, Stavanger and London. The firm has 29 attorneys who are admitted into the Supreme Court. Thommessen specializes in stock exchange and transaction law, litigation and arbitration, as well as general business legal advice. The company's clients are mainly Norwegian listed companies and foreign companies. Thommessen is the largest law firm within M&A in the Nordic region.

The company was founded on 19 January 1856, when Hans Christian Grønn established a private law practice in Oslo. Grønn wanted to distinguish the legal profession from the civil service and fought to make business law more international. Green was Attorney General in the period 1870-1873. The company assisted in the establishment of Norsk Hydro-Elektrisk Kvælstof-aktieselskap in 1905.

In the 1990s, there were great growth and several major mergers in the Norwegian legal profession. This development began with the establishment of ‘Thommessen & Krefting’ in 1990, through the merger between the companies ‘Thommessen Karlsrud Heyerdahl & Brunsvig’ and ‘Krefting & Løchen’ (which was established in 1954). In 1991, ‘Thommessen & Krefting’ merged with what was then Norway's largest law firm outside Oslo, the company ‘Greve, Greve, Greve & Lorentzen’ in Bergen (which was established in 1928). In 1993, parts of the law firm ‘Lund & Co’ were merged and the company's name became ‘Thommessen Krefting Greve Lund AS Advokatfirma’. From 1 September 2009, the company's name was changed to ‘Advokatfirmaet Thommessen AS’.

== Awards and accomplishments ==
Thommessen has won a number of awards in recent years. In 2021, Thommessen was named ‘Norwegian Firm of the Year’ by Who's Who Legal for the thirteenth year in a row in their annual award for leading law firms in over 70 jurisdictions. Thommessen won the Chamber's Europe Award for best Norwegian law firm in 2021, 2013, 2011 and 2009. In the Prospera survey, Thommessen received the award for Norway's best law firm in 2020, 2018, 2017, 2016 and 2015, and during the IFLR Europe Awards 2020, Thommessen was awarded the prize for ‘National firm of the year – Norway’. In 2020, the company was also named the year's leading legal advisor in mergers and acquisitions (M&A) in Norway by Mergermarkedet.

Thommessen is the Norwegian member of Lex Mundi, a leading worldwide network of independent, distinguished law firms.
