= Karl Frimann Dahl =

Norwegian judge (1868–1953)

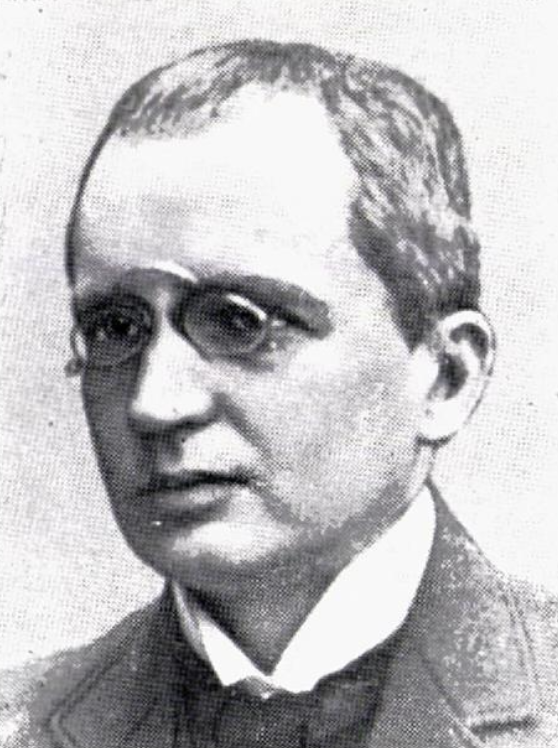
- Born: 19 September 1868; Christiania, Norway
- Died: 1953 (aged 84–85)
- Occupation: Judge

Karl Frimann Dahl (19 September 1868 – 1953) was a Norwegian judge.

He was born in Christiania to Nils Astrup Dahl and Johanne Marie Hambro. He graduated as cand.jur. in 1888, and was named as a Supreme Court Justice from 1918 to 1938.
