= Kristin Normann =

Norwegian judge and legal scholar (born 1954)

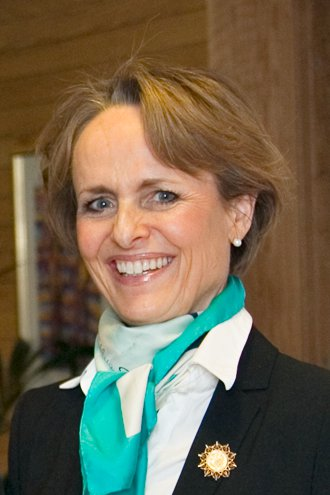
- Kristin Normann, 2010.

Supreme Court Justice
- Incumbent
- Assumed office August 2010

Kristin Normann (born 1 May 1954) is a Norwegian judge and legal scholar.

She was born in Oslo, and took the cand.jur. degree in 1982. A 1973 graduate of South Mecklenburg High School in Charlotte, North Carolina, she was a research fellow, associate professor and professor at the University of Oslo between 1985 and 2007, and took the dr.juris degree in 1994. In 2003 she was an acting presiding judge in Borgarting Court of Appeal. She was a partner in the law firm Selmer DA from 2006 to 2010, and is a Supreme Court Justice from August 2010.
