= John Gjerde =

Norwegian politician (1929–2005)

- Born: 10 May 1929; Sande Municipality, Norway
- Died: 7 March 2005 (aged 75)
- Occupation: Norwegian politician
- Office: Deputy representative to the Norwegian Parliament
- Political party: Liberal Party (Norway)

John Gjerde (10 May 1929 – 7 March 2005) was a Norwegian politician for the Liberal Party.

== Life and career ==
John Gjerde was born in Sande Municipality on 10 May 1929.

Gjerde served as a deputy representative to the Norwegian Parliament from Møre og Romsdal during the term 1977–1981.

On the local level Gjerde held various positions on the municipal council for Sande Municipality from 1959 to 1964 and 1971 to 1987, serving as mayor from 1975.

John Gjerde died on 7 March 2005, at the age of 75.
