= Jan Skåre =

Norwegian judge (1929–2018)

Jan Rasmus Skåre (17 January 1929 – 27 May 2018) was a Norwegian judge.

Skåre was born in Førde Municipality, Norway and worked in the Ministry of Justice and the Police from 1959, becoming sub-director in 1975. He was then a Supreme Court Justice from 1978 to 1998.
