= Trygve Wyller =

Norwegian theologian (born 1950)

Trygve Wyller (born 4 June 1950) is a Norwegian theologian.

He was born in Stavanger. He took the cand.mag. degree in 1975, and the cand.theol. degree in 1982. He did not follow a straight academic path, as he worked as a journalist in Aftenposten from 1979 to 1983, and as a priest from 1984 to 1988. Then, he was a research fellow from 1989, and took the dr.theol. degree at the University of Oslo in 1994, on the thesis Troens tale og talen om verden. He was appointed as an associate professor at the same institution in 1996, and was promoted to professor of theology in 2002.

In 2006 he was elected as the dean of the Faculty of Theology, ahead of the other candidate Halvor Moxnes. In 2009, Wyller entered the race to become rector of the University of Oslo. The rector is elected by students and faculty, and his sole opponent is Ole Petter Ottersen. On 2 April 2009, it was clear that Ottersen won the rectorial election.

Academic offices
| Preceded by Helge Steinar Kvanvig | Dean of the Faculty of Theology, University of Oslo; 2006–present | Incumbent |
