= Ingvald Falch =

Norwegian judge (born 1963)

Ingvald Falch (born 1963) is a Norwegian judge.

He was born in Bærum, and graduated from the University of Oslo with the cand.jur. degree in 1989, later also a Master of Law degree from Cambridge University in 1996. He was a deputy judge in Vesterålen from 1990 to 1991 before starting as a lawyer, worked in the Office of the Attorney General of Norway and reached a partnership with the law firm Schjødt in 1999. He was appointed as a Supreme Court Justice in 2015.
