= Nils Peder Langvand =

Norwegian judge

Nils Peder Langvand (12 June 1929 – 31 October 2002) was a Norwegian judge.

He was born in Volda Municipality. He was a presiding judge in Gulating Court of Appeal from 1971 and in Eidsivating Court of Appeal from 1977, and a Supreme Court Justice from 1984 to 1996.
