= Trygve Bendiksby =

Norwegian judge

Trygve Bendiksby (1907–1992) was a Norwegian judge.

He was born in Modum of farmer roots. He finished his secondary education in 1925, and graduated with the cand.jur. degree in 1930. From 1933 he worked as a deputy judge in Nordmøre, and from 1936 to 1940 he was a secretary in the Norwegian Ministry of Justice and the Police.

In 1946 he was an acting judge in Oslo District Court for a few months, before being appointed as a district stipendiary magistrate on the Senja District Court in September. In 1952 he was named as a Supreme Court Justice, and he stood in this position until his retirement in 1977. He died in 1992.
