= Thor Breien =

Norwegian judge

- Born: 9 February 1899; Kristiania, Norway
- Died: 18 December 1973 (aged 74)
- Occupation: Judge
- Awards: Order of St. Olav

Thor Breien (9 February 1899 – 18 December 1973) was a Norwegian judge.

He was born in Kristiania to judge Haakon Hasberg Breien and Andrea Landstad. He graduated as cand.jur. in 1921. He was judge at the Eidsivating Court of Appeal from 1946 to 1970, and served as acting Supreme Court Justice in 1957. He was decorated Commander of the Order of St. Olav in 1969.
