= Anton Martin Schweigaard =

Norwegian politician (1808–1870)

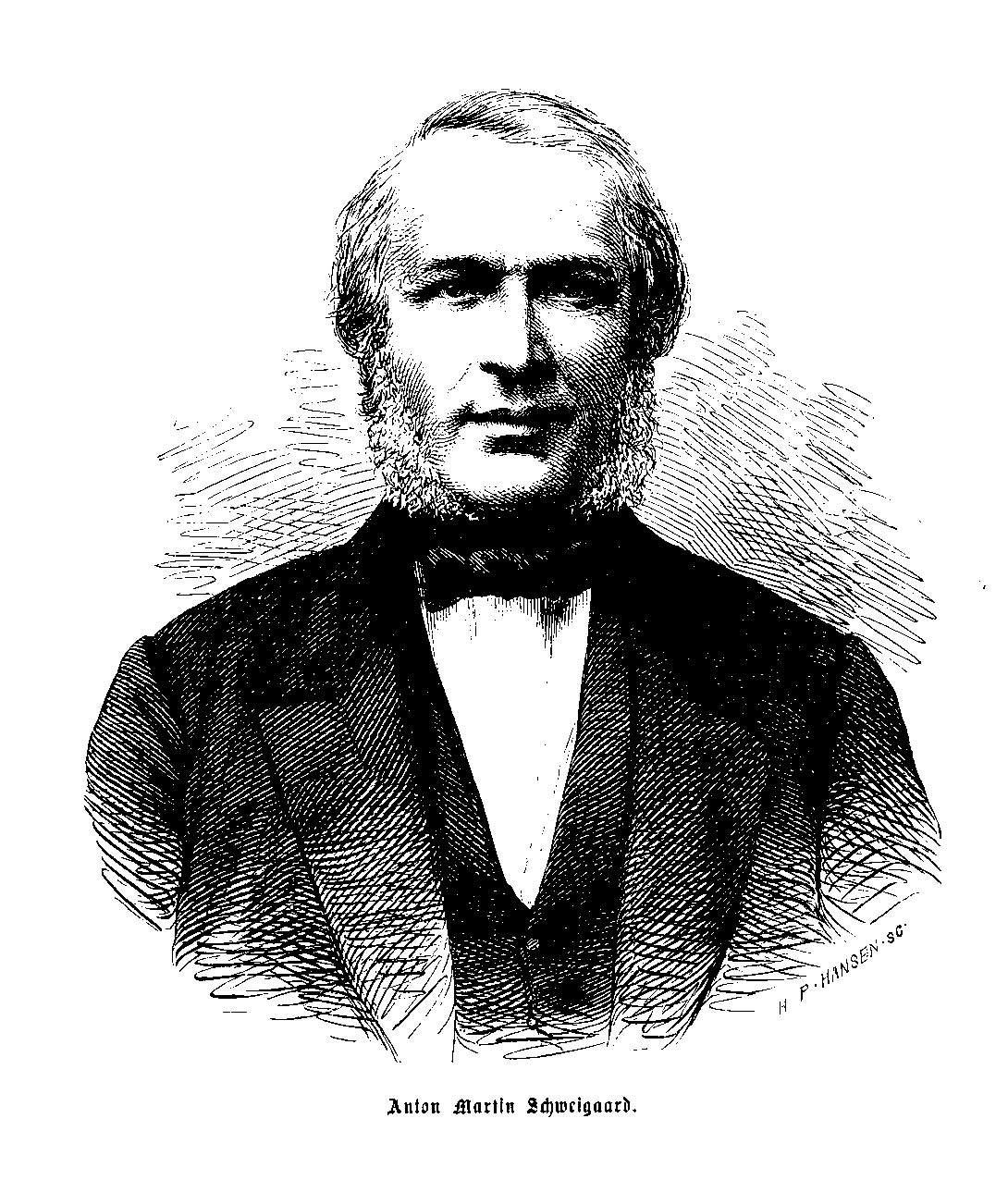
A. M. Schweigaard

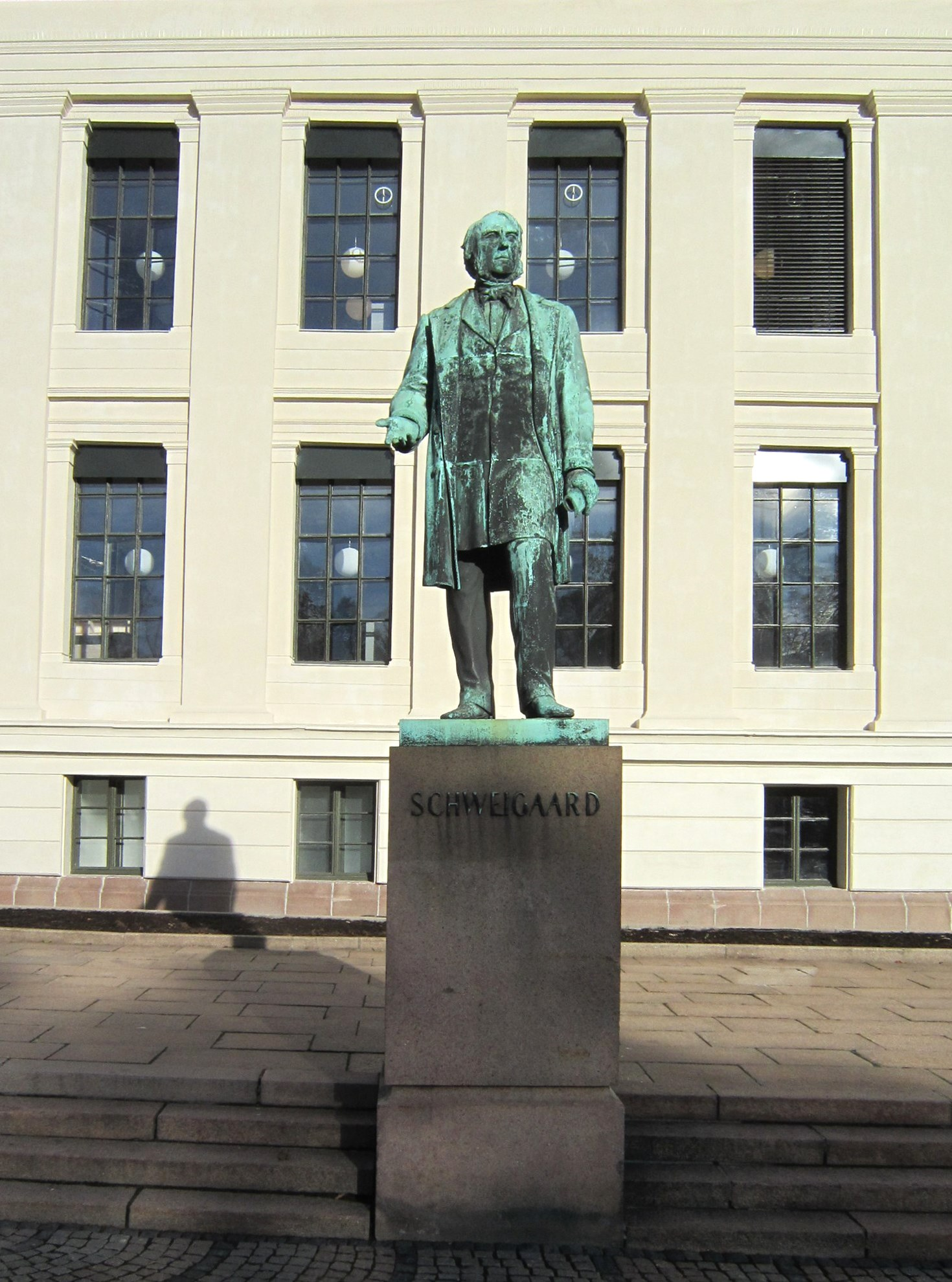
Statue of A. M. Schweigaard at Universitetsplassen by Julius Middelthun

Anton Martin Schweigaard (11 April 1808 – 1 February 1870) was a Norwegian educator, jurist, economist and member of the Norwegian Parliament.

== Background ==
Schweigaard was born at Kragerø in Telemark, Norway. He was one of three children of Jørgen Fredrik Schweigaard (1771–1818) and Johanne Marie Dahll (1785–1818). Both parents died when he was 10 years old and the children were raised by their grandmother. He studied law at the University of Christiania, where he received his degree in 1832. The following year, the Norwegian Parliament gave him a scholarship to study abroad in Germany and France.

== Career ==
When he returned to Norway, he got a position as a lecturer at the University of Christiania. He was a professor of both jurisprudence and economics during the 1830s and 1840s. In economic theory, he was an extremely influential publicist for economic liberalism, although not a supporter of Laissez-faire economic ideology. He advocated that the state had an important and necessary role to play in economic life. He is widely credited in helping bring about Norway's change to a capitalist economy. In legal theory, Schweigaard was opposed to the German jurisprudence and legal philosophy that had dominated Northern Europe since the Age of Enlightenment, including natural law. He believed that the stark dichotomies of conceptualism were misleading. Schweigaard figures prominently the theory of Nordic legal pragmatism advanced by Sverre Blandhol, along with Anders Sandøe Ørsted and Friedrich Carl von Savigny.

From 1842 to 1869, he was a member of the Norwegian Parliament. His strong belief in the country's economic capabilities made him the leading spokesman in Parliament for construction of railways and development of mail and telegraph services. In 1865, he was elected a member of the Royal Swedish Academy of Sciences.

== Selected works ==
- Betragtninger over Retsvidenskabens nærværende Tilstand i Tydskland (1834)
- De la philosophie allemande (1835)
- Den norske Handelsret (1841)
- Den norske administrative Ret (1842)

== Personal life ==
He was married during 1835 to Caroline Magnine Homann (1814-1870). Their son, Christian Homann Schweigaard, became Prime Minister of Norway in 1884. Schweigaard and his wife both died during 1870. Both were buried at Vår Frelsers gravlund in Christiania (now Oslo).
