= 2015 in Norway =

- Centuries: 19th; 20th; 21st
- Decades: 1990s; 2000s; 2010s; 2020s
- See also: List of years in Norway

Events in the year 2015 in Norway.

== Incumbents ==
- Monarch – Harald V.
- Prime Minister – Erna Solberg (Conservative).

== Events ==
- The 2015 European migrant crisis.

=== January ===
- 3 January – MS Bulk Jupiter, a Norwegian-owned cargo ship, sinks off the coast of Vietnam, with eighteen dead and one survivor.
- 30–31 January – The World Woman festival in Oslo

=== February ===
- 7–15 February − the World Ski Orienteering Championships took place in Hamar and Løten.
- 26 February – Norwegian police raid the offices of the Roman Catholic Diocese of Oslo, charging the church administration with serious fraud under the suspicion of wrongfully claiming as much as NOK 50 million in state support by presenting fraudulent membership statistics.
- 28 February-10 March – Pilot strike in Norwegian Air Shuttle.

=== September ===
- 14 September – The 2015 local elections

=== October ===
- Jon Fosse is awarded the Nordic Council Literature Prize, for Andvake (2007), Olavs draumar (2012) and Kveldsvævd (2014).

=== November ===
- 28 November – Production at Edvard Grieg oil field on the Utsira High begins (named after composer and pianist Edvard Grieg)

== Anniversaries ==
- 200 years since the foundation of the Supreme Court of Norway

== Notable deaths ==
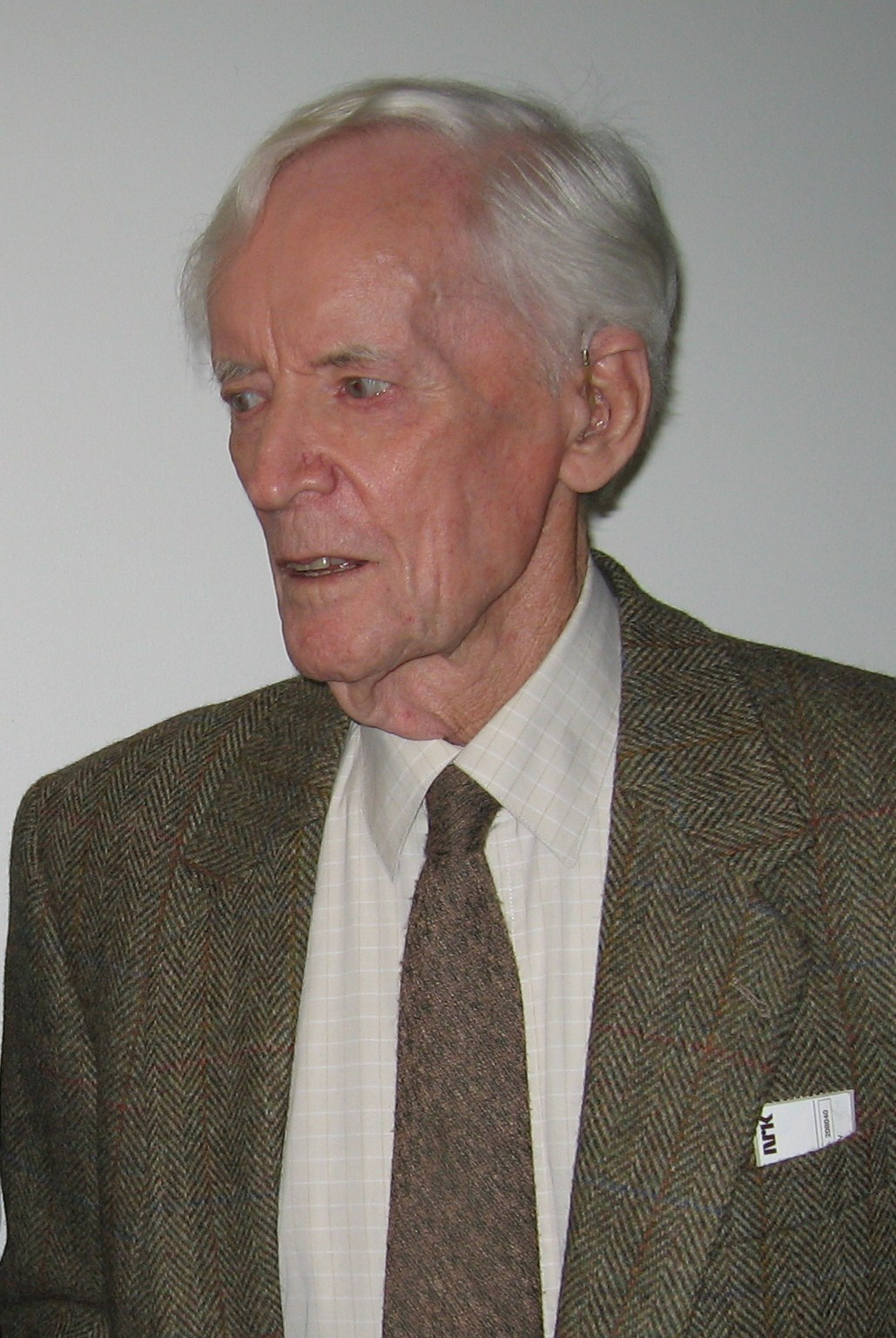
Kjell Arnljot Wig

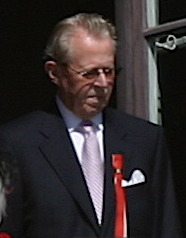
Johan Ferner in 2007

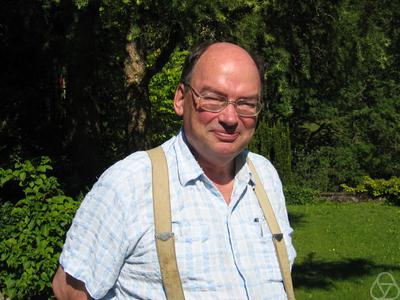
Ola Bratteli, mathematician

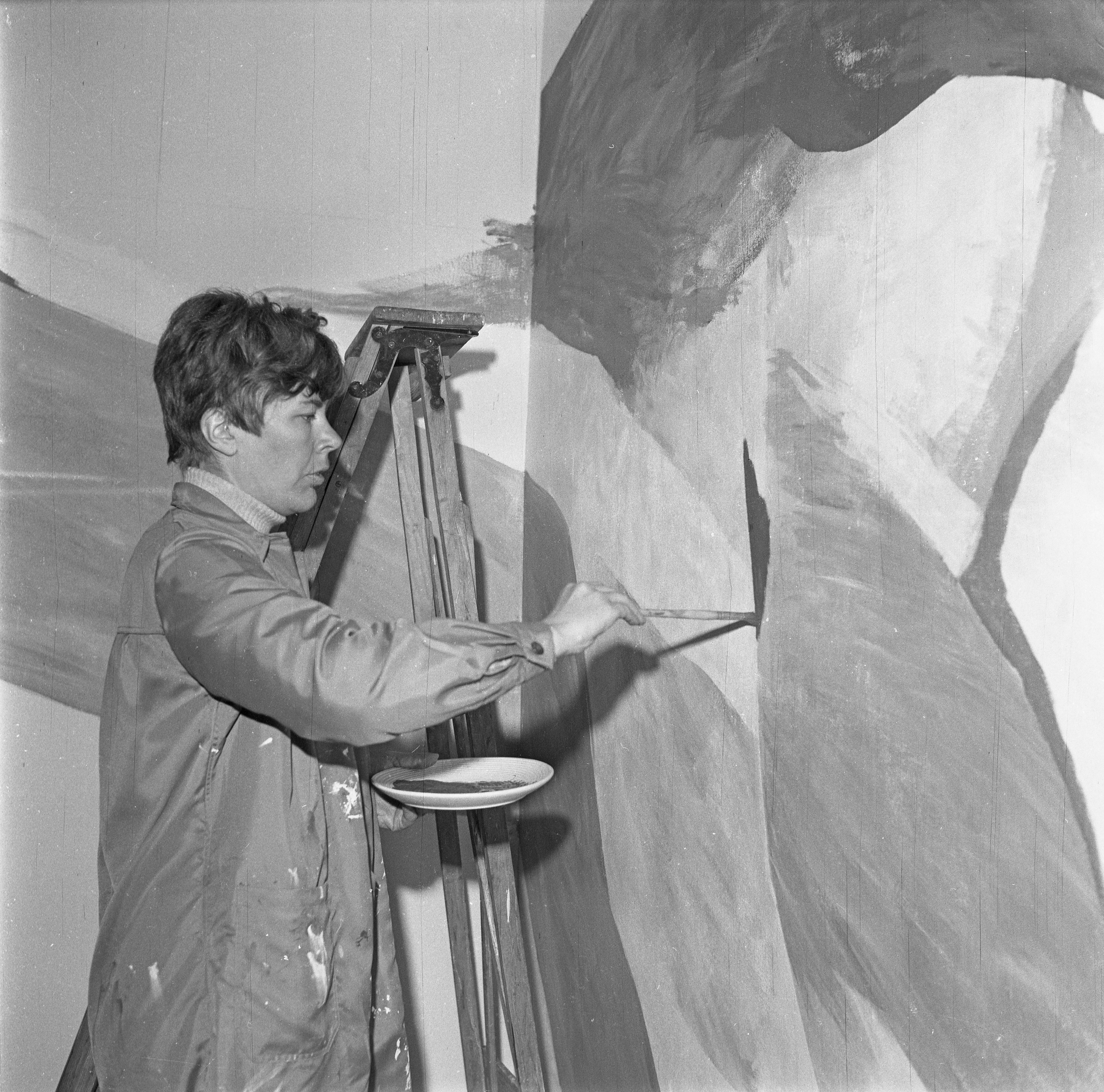
Inger Sitter in 1967

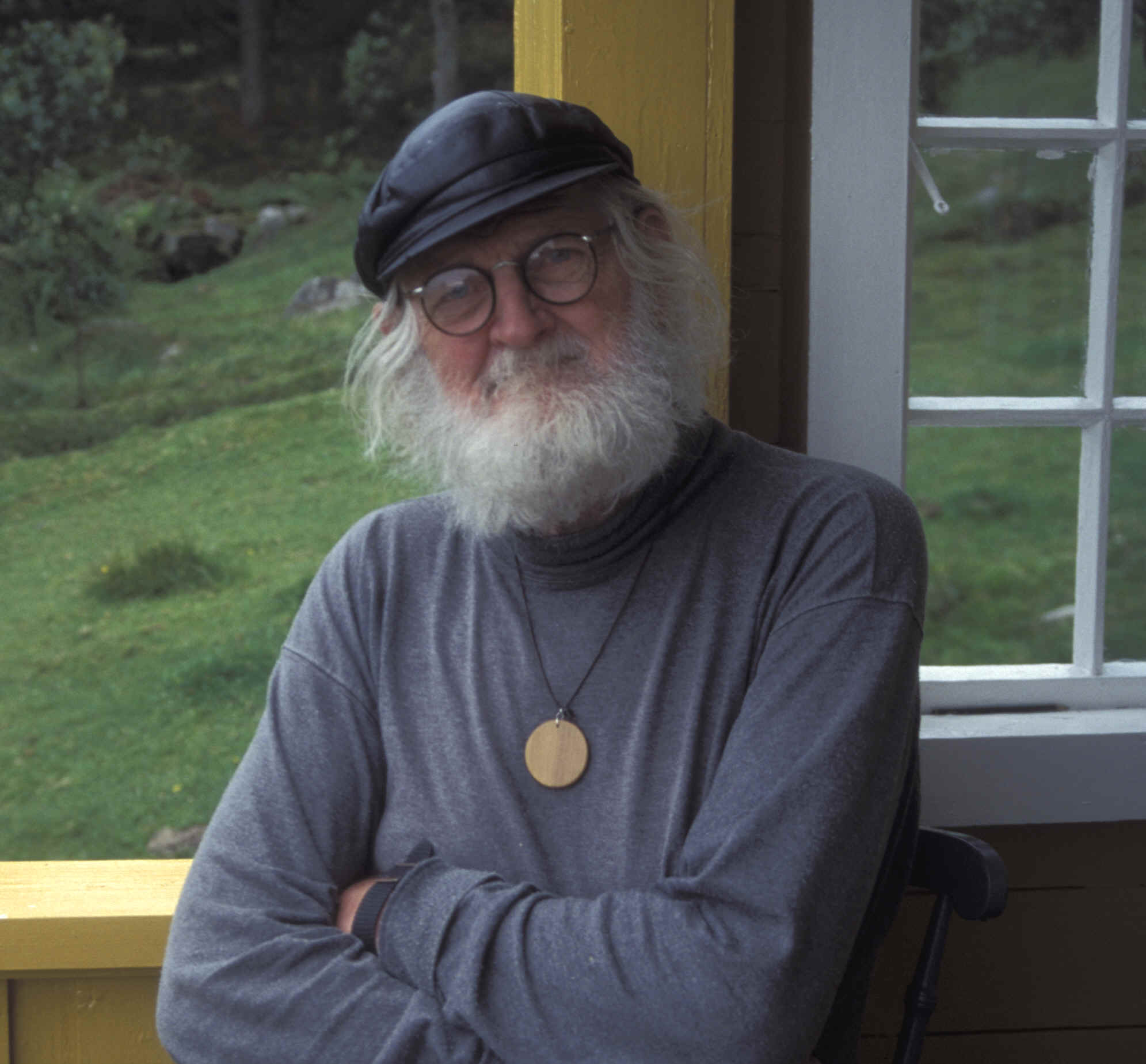
Martin Nag

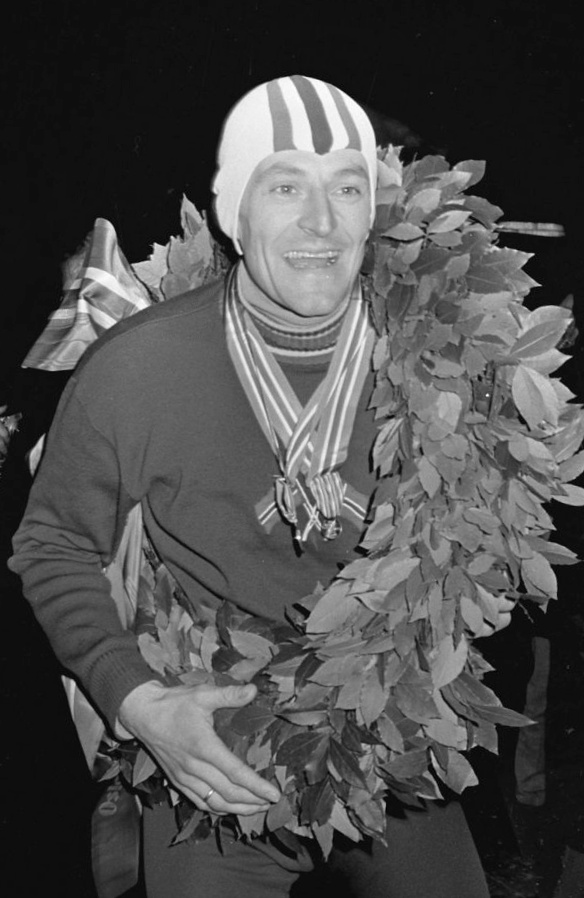
Fred Anton Maier

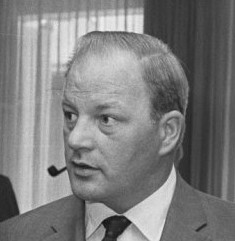
Alv Jakob Fostervoll

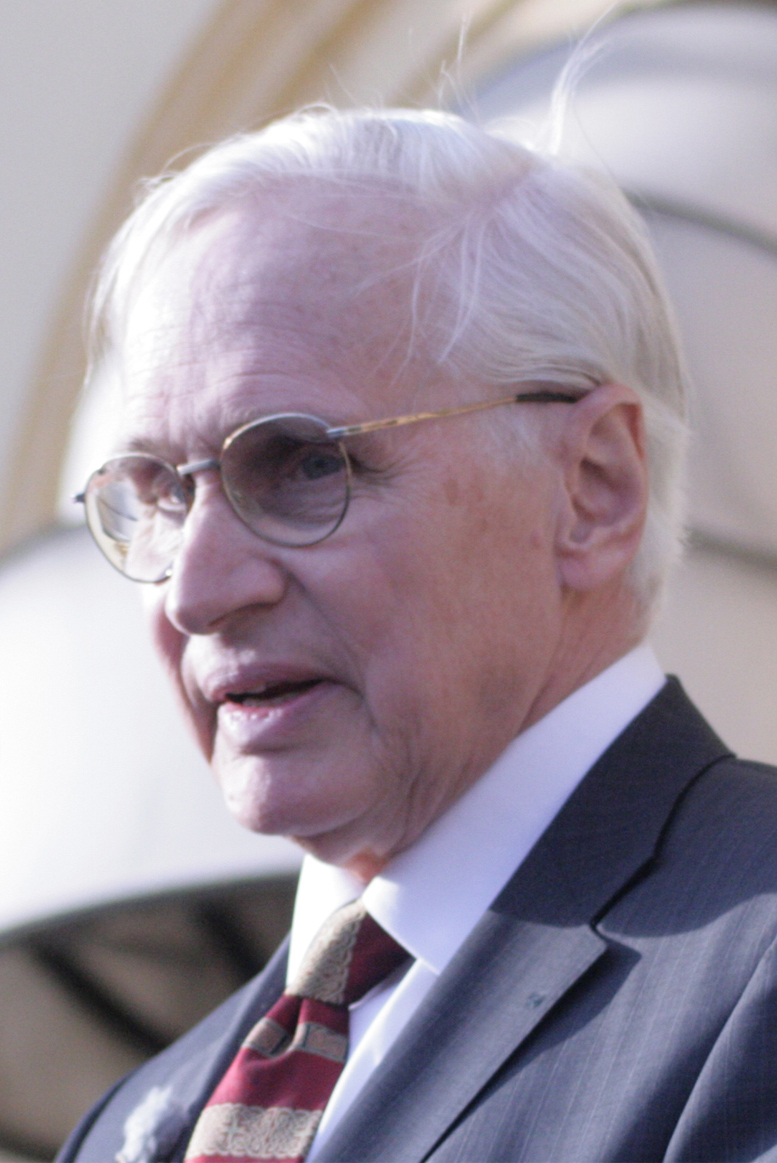
Francis Sejersted

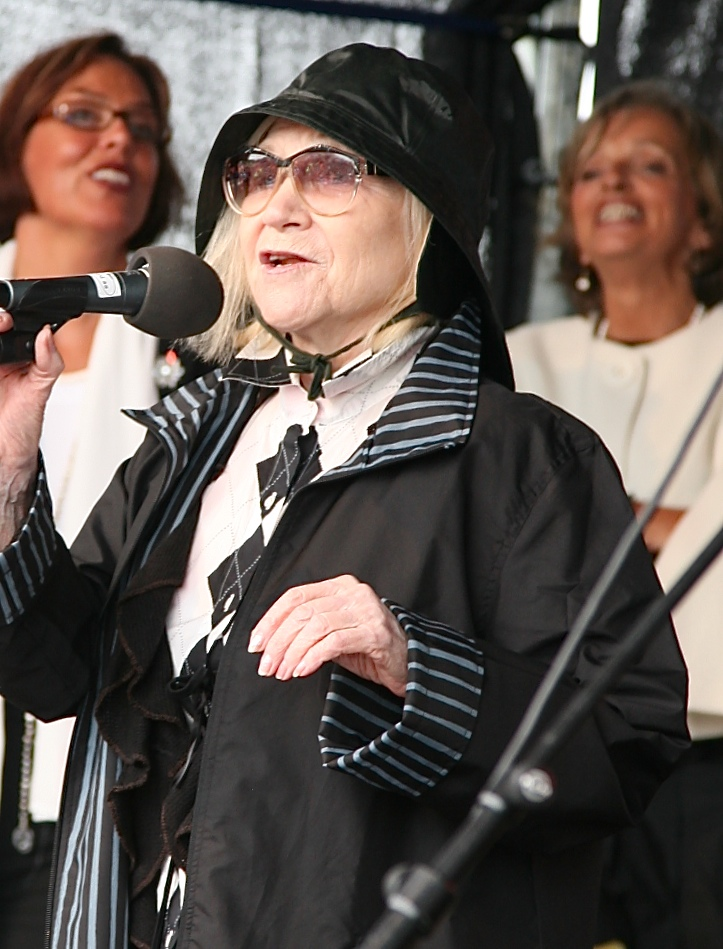
Nora Brockstedt

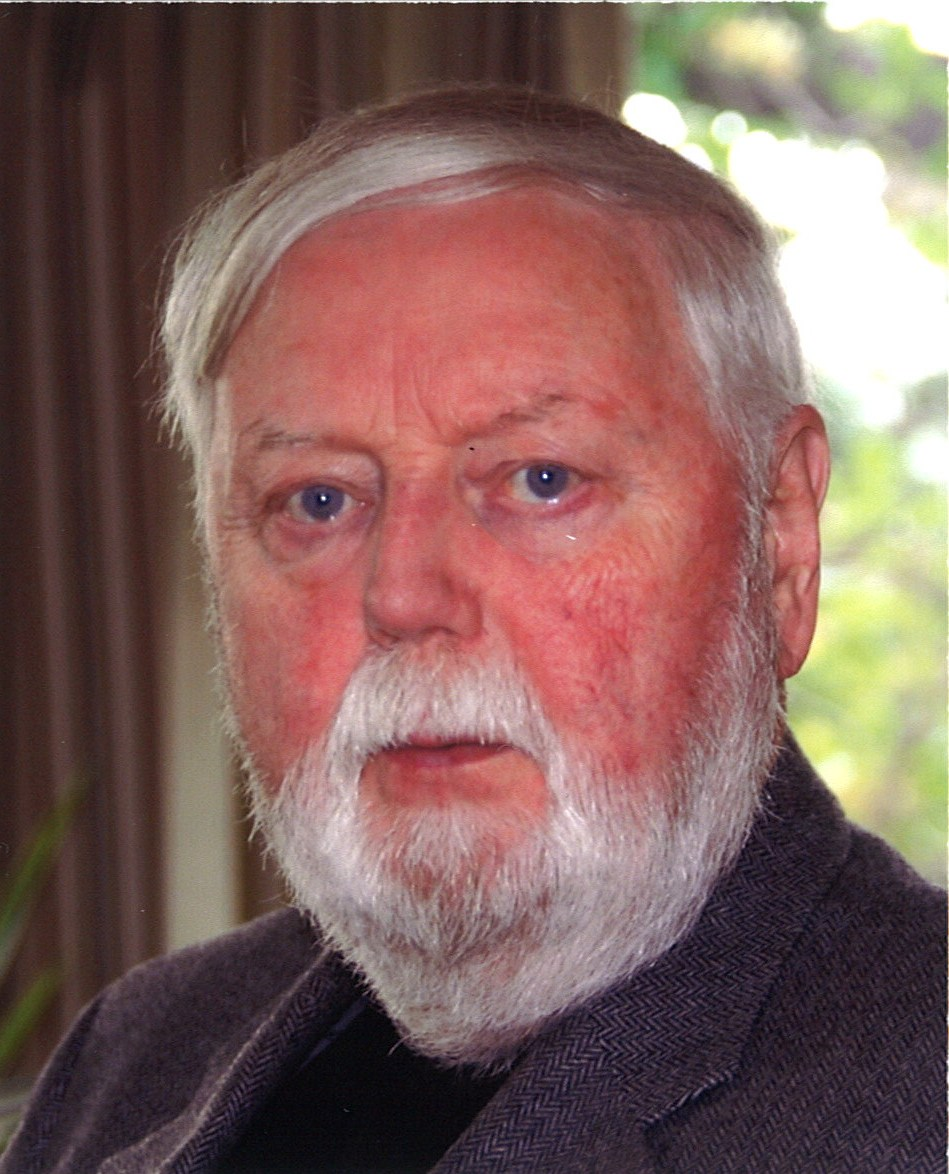
Dag Skogheim

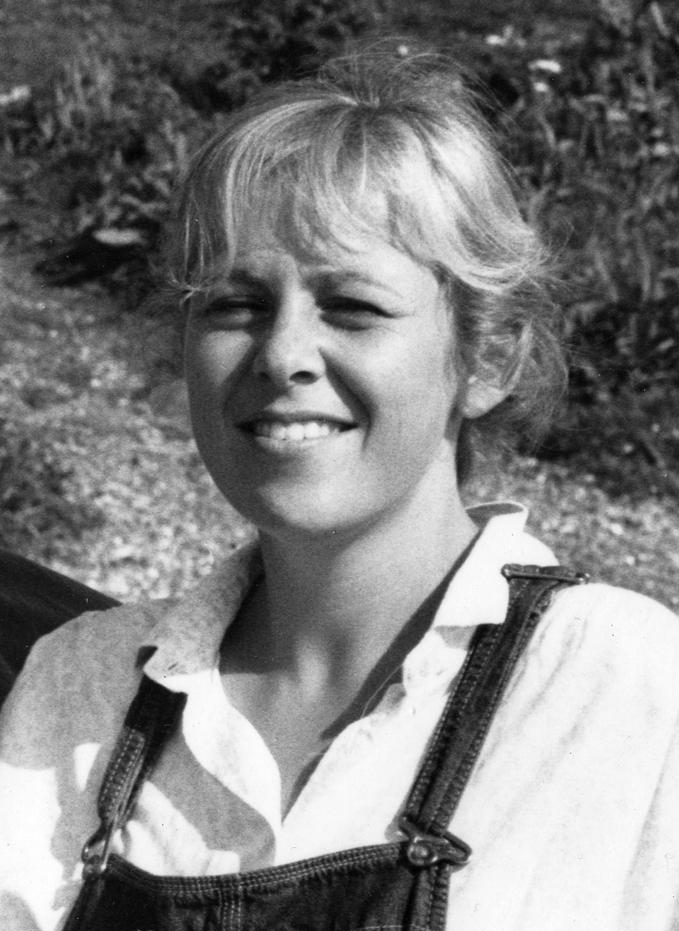
Turid Birkeland

- 1 January – Tore Helge Larsen, harness racer (b. 1945)
- 1 January – Kjell Noreik, professor of medicine (b. 1929)
- 2 January – Kristian Sundtoft, politician (b. 1937)
- 3 January – Willy Ovesen, civil servant (b. 1924)
- 6 January – Else M. Barth, philosopher (b. 1928)
- 7 January – Jon Narvestad, sportsperson and film director (b. 1932)
- 8 January – Egil Toreng, newspaper editor (b. 1922)
- 8 January – Andreas Bernhard Gamst, politician (b. 1923)
- 9 January – Trygve Kaldahl, agrarian leader (b. 1922)
- 14 January – Thor G. Norås, children's writer (b. 1935)
- 14 January – Andreas Edwien, critic (b. 1921)
- 17 January – Fritz C. Holte, economist (b. 1925)
- 18 January – Kjell Arnljot Wig, television presenter (b. 1925)
- Thor Nohr, handballer
- 23 January – Svein Døvle Larssen, newspaper editor (b. 1928)
- 24 January – Johan Ferner, businessperson (b. 1927)
- 24 January – Maryon Eilertsen, actress (b. 1950)
- 27 January – Gunnar Christie Wasberg, librarian and writer (b. 1923)
- 27 January – Bjørn Andressen, ice hockey player (b. 1946).
- 2 February – Christian Backer-Owe, printmaker (b. 1924)
- 4 February – Kristian Rambjør, businessperson (b. 1938)
- 5 February – Dagfinn Tveito, horticulturalist (b. 1927)
- 7 February – Knut Tiberg, printmaker (b. 1938, died in Sweden)
- 8 February – Ola Bratteli, mathematician (b. 1946)
- 9 February – Øyvind Bjorvatn, politician (b. 1931)
- 9 February – Ivar Ramvi, dean (b. 1925)
- 10 February – Hans Torgersen, politician (b. 1926)
- 11 February – Tancred Ibsen, Jr., diplomat (b. 1921)
- 12 February – Helge Revold, painter (b. 1931)
- 14 February – Asbjørn Kjønstad, professor of law (b. 1943)
- 14 February – Torstein Hovig, professor of medicine (b. 1928)
- 15 February – Jacob Stolt-Nielsen, ship-owner (b. 1931)
- 17 February – Nils Weyer Arveschoug, major general (b. 1924)
- 20 February – Øyvind Ruud, politician (b. 1944)
- 20 February – Bjørg Løhner Øien, figure skater (b. 1928).
- 22 February – Erik Amundsen, jazz bassist (b. 1937)
- 25 February – Alf Rongved, sculptor (b. 1929)
- 3 March – Ingulf Diesen, Christian leader (b. 1928)
- 3 March – Jørn Aksel Krog, civil servant (b. 1948)
- 4 March – Knut T. Giæver, publisher (b. 1926)
- 5 March – Dag Frogner, painter and scenographer (born 1929).
- 5 March – Erling Sandene, Chief Justice (b. 1921)
- 5 March – Aud Greiff, translator (b. 1927)
- 7 March – Roar Antonsen, sports official (b. 1916)
- 7 March – Sverre Stallvik, ski jumper (b. 1927).
- 11 March – Inger Sitter, painter (b. 1929)
- 14 March – Johan Chr. Schønheyder, orienteer and sports official (b. 1915)
- 21 March – Eddie Sjøborg, businessperson (b. 1940)
- 22 March – Sigfrid Mohn, politician (b. 1930)
- 26 March – Fred Robsahm, actor (b. 1943)
- 27 March – Annelise Høegh, politician (b. 1948)
- 28 March – Bjørn Heyn, weightlifter (b. 1928).
- Ellen Brochmann, hotelier (b. 1921)
- 1 April – Bjørg Holmsen, politician (b. 1931)
- 5 April – Aagot Noss, ethnologist (b. 1924)
- 8 April – Hilde Stavik, athlete (b. 1962)
- 8 April – Leiv Kjøllmoen, politician (b. 1930)
- 9 April – Johan B. Steen, biologist (b. 1934)
- Georg Monsen, footballer (b. 1922)
- 11 April – Martin Tore Bjørndal, diplomat (b. 1944)
- 17 April – Tore Bernitz Pedersen, illustrator and comics artist (b. 1935).
- 18 April – Gunnar Gravdahl, politician (b. 1927)
- 19 April – Else Repål, politician (b. 1930)
- 1 May – Samuel Steinmann, Holocaust survivor (b. 1923)
- 3 May – Halvor Bergan, bishop (b. 1931)
- 5 May – Odd Lie, gymnast (b. 1926).
- 8 May – Leif Holger Larsen, diplomat (b. 1954)
- 8 May – Martin Nag, writer (b. 1927)
- 9 May – Ragne Tangen, children's television presenter (b. 1927)
- 14 May – Arild Rypdal, crime fiction writer (b. 1934).
- 18 May – Steiner Arvid Kvalø, fisher and politician (b. 1922)
- 20 May – Simon Flem Devold, columnist (b. 1927)
- 23 May – Asbjørn Øksendal, writer (b. 1922)
- 23 May – Liv Marit Wedvik, country singer (b. 1970)
- 23 May – Carl Nesjar, painter and sculptor (b. 1920).
- 26 May – Sverre Johan Juvik, politician (b. 1922)
- 27 May – Nils Christie, criminologist (b. 1928).
- 29 May – Erling Bjørn, cross-country skier (b. 1931)
- 29 May – Anders Lysne, educationalist (b. 1926)
- 9 June – Fred Anton Maier, speed skater (b. 1938)
- 9 June – Finn Backer, Supreme Court justice (b. 1927)
- 12 June – Tor Bjerkedal, professor of medicine (b. 1926)
- 15 June – Alv Jakob Fostervoll, politician (b. 1922)
- 15 June – Thorvald S. Sætersdal, anatomist (b. 1926)
- 17 June – Per Arne Bjerke, journalist (b. 1952)
- 18 June – Fredrik Fasting Torgersen, convict and poet (b. 1934)
- 19 June – Per Ludvig Magnus, diplomat (b. 1945)
- 25 June – Nicolay Apollyon, composer (b. 1945, died in France)
- 27 June – Knut Helle, historian (b. 1930)
- 28 June – Eli-Marie Johnsen, textile artist (b. 1926, died in Sweden)
- 29 June – Ivar Samset, forester (b. 1918)
- 29 June – Helge Ole Bergesen, politician (b. 1949)
- 3 July – Odd Seim-Haugen, skiing official (b. 1937)
- 7 July – Johan Auranaune, politician (b. 1926)
- 8 July – Arne Kotte, footballer (b. 1935)
- 8 July – Helge Eide Knudsen, businessperson (b. 1933)
- 11 July – Svein Hatløy, architect (b. 1940)
- 14 July – Gerd Gudding, musician (b. 1951)
- 14 July – Gabriel Ålgård, politician (b. 1952)
- 16 July – Roar Sundseth, major general (b. 1954)
- 18 July – Per Tønder, politician (b. 1911)
- 21 July – Olav Riste, historian (b. 1933)
- 27 July – Sigmund Lillebjerka, composer (b. 1931)
- 28 July – Johan Arnt Wenaas, priest (b. 1941)
- 1 August – Kjell Haug, novelist (b. 1933)
- 9 August – Kåre Flokenes, translator (b. 1928)
- 10 August – Knut Osnes, footballer and coach (b. 1922)
- 12 August – Per Hjort Albertsen, composer (b. 1919)
- 13 August – Inger-Marie Kristensen, politician (b. 1932)
- 18 August – Nils Bølset, diplomat (b. 1928)
- 19 August – Karl Nandrup Dahl, jurist (b. 1931)
- 19 August – Ole Jacob Frich, politician (b. 1954)
- 20 August – Ingrid Mortensen, ceramicist (b. 1941)
- 25 August – Francis Sejersted, historian (b. 1936)
- 26 August – Arne Gunnarsjaa, architect (b. 1939)
- 27 August – Trygve Sverre Stefanussen, politician (b. 1934)
- 30 August – Natalia Strelchenko, pianist (b. 1976)
- 1 September – Stein Løvold, scouting leader (b. 1944)
- 2 September – Tone Thiis Schjetne, sculptor (b. 1928)
- 6 September – Thor-Erik Lundby, ice hockey player (b. 1937)
- 7 September – Bjørn Simonnæs, architect (b. 1921)
- 11 September – Knut Næss, footballer (b. 1927)
- 23 September – Tor Arneberg, yacht racer (b. 1929, died in the US).
- 25 September – Terje Gulbrandsen, footballer (b. 1944)
- 25 September – Morten Krogh, fencer and actor (b. 1948)
- 26 September – Sjur Hopperstad, politician (b. 1930)
- 27 September – Torgeir Stensrud, businessman (b. 1949)
- 27 September – Odd Emil Blomdal, civil servant (b. 1927)
- 28 September – Knut Nordstoga, veterinarian (b. 1927)
- 28 September – Bjørn Myhre, archaeologist (b. 1938)
- 30 September – Svein B. Manum, botanist (b. 1926)
- 5 October – Gina Regland-Sigstad, cross-country skier (b. 1927).
- 13 October – Arne Bust Mykle, puppeteer (b. 1937)
- 13 October – Leif Mevik, diplomat (b. 1930)
- 15 October – Magne Kristian Mælumshagen, politician (b. 1928)
- 23 October – Roar Johansen, footballer (b. 1935)
- 24 October – Fredrik Grønvold, chemist (b. 1924)
- 29 October – Per Brunvand, newspaper editor (b. 1937)
- 3 November – Nils Nygaard, legal scholar (b. 1932)
- 4 November – Ole Knapp, politician (b. 1931)
- 4 November – Kai Zahl, disability rights activist (b. 1932)
- 5 November – Nora Brockstedt, singer (b. 1923)
- 8 November – Wetle Holtan, playwright (b. 1970)
- 10 November – Erik Henriksen, investor (b. 1957)
- 11 November – Ole Sjølie, painter (b. 1923)
- 17 November – Thorbjørn Rygh, designer (b. 1924)
- 18 November – Bjørn Borgen, footballer (b. 1937)
- 20 November – Ketil Vea, composer (b. 1932)
- 25 November – Svein "Chrico" Christiansen, jazz drummer (b. 1941)
- 27 November – Ragnhild Barland, politician (b. 1934)
- 28 November – Inger Moen, linguist (b. 1940)
- 1 December – Arvid Eikevik, painter (b. 1935)
- 2 December – Tor Skjånes, architect (b. 1923)
- 2 December – Theodor Borchgrevink, civil servant (b. 1923)
- 2 December – Ernst "Kruska" Larsen, runner (b. 1926)
- 4 December – Dag Skogheim, writer (b. 1928)
- 6 December – Jakob Rypdal, athlete (b. 1926)
- 6 December – Georg Smefjell, ice hockey player (b. 1937).
- 16 December – Svein Bakke, footballer (b. 1953)
- 16 December – Jostein Eriksen, opera singer (b. 1926)
- 18 December – Helge Solum Larsen, politician (b. 1969)
- 18 December – Martin Jære, cross-country skier (b. 1920)
- 20 December – Kaare Norman Selvig, businessperson (b. 1918)
- 24 December – Merete Wiger, author (b. 1921)
- 24 December – Turid Birkeland, politician (b. 1962)
- 25 December – Fredrik Kiil, physician (b. 1921)
- 26 December – Tore Andersen, country musician (b. 1960)
- 26 December – Ståle Eskeland, legal scholar (b. 1943)
- 27 December – Stein Eriksen, alpine skier (b. 1927)
- 28 December – Tone Nyhagen, dancer (b. 1963)
- 28 December – Åge Nordkild, politician (b. 1951)

== See also ==
- 2015 in Norwegian music
- 2015 in Norwegian television
