= 1927 in Norway =

- Centuries: 18th; 19th; 20th; 21st
- Decades: 1900s; 1910s; 1920s; 1930s; 1940s
- See also: List of years in Norway

Events in the year 1927 in Norway.

== Incumbents ==
- Monarch – Haakon VII.

== Events ==
- Norsk Hydro forms a companionship with the German company IG Farben in order to gain access to the newly developed Haber-Bosch process for manufacturing artificial fertilizer. By 1945 IG Farben has become majority shareholder.
- The 1927 Parliamentary election takes place.

== Popular culture ==
=== Sports ===
- The first ski jumping hill of Midtstubakken was constructed.
- Oslo hosted the World Figure Skating Championships.

=== Literature ===
- Arbeidermagasinet established.
- The Knut Hamsund novel Landstrykere Volume 1 & 2 (Wayfarers), was published.
- The two books of Olav Audunssøn, by Sigrid Undset, was published.

=== Arts ===
- The avant-garde theatre Balkongen is started by Agnes Mowinckel.

== Sport ==
- The first ski jumping hill of Midtstubakken was constructed in 1927
- Oslo hosted the 1927 World Figure Skating Championships

== Notable births ==
- 7 January - Jan Bull, author and theatre instructor (died 1985)
- 18 January
  - Jack Erik Kjuus, anti-immigration politician (died 2009)
  - Johannes Østtveit, politician (died 2013)
- 27 January – Torvild Aakvaag, businessperson (died 2020).
- 30 January – Odd Blomdal, judge and civil servant (died 2015)
- 5 February – Kristian Kvakland, sculptor and artist (died 2011)
- 14 February – Kjell Thorbjørn Kristensen, politician (died 1995)
- 17 February – Leif Kolflaath, politician (died 2001)
- 19 February – Ørjar Øyen, sociologist (died 2024).
- 7 March – John Olav Larssen, evangelical preacher and missionary (died 2009)
- 15 March – Else Breen, children's writer, novelist and literary scientist (died 2025).
- 16 March – Gunnar Vada, politician (died 2018)
- 20 March – Marie Borge Refsum, politician (died 2023)
- 25 March – Tordis Ørjasæter, writer and literary critic (died 2026).
- 29 March – Bjørge Lillelien, sports journalist and commentator (died 1987)
- 31 March – Knut Frydenlund, politician and Minister (died 1987)
- 3 April – Arne Johansen, speed skater and Olympic bronze medallist (died 2013).
- 4 April – Sigurd Kalheim, politician (died 2007)
- 5 April – Arne Hoel, ski jumper (died 2006)
- 24 April – Ingerid Vardund, actress (died 2006)
- 29 April – Harald U. Lied, politician (died 2002)
- 10 May – Eva Knardahl, pianist (died 2006)
- 13 May – Willy Jansson, politician (died 2019)
- 16 May – Jan W. Dietrichson, Norwegian philologist (died 2019)
- 19 May – Sivert Langholm, historian (died 2022)
- 23 May – Bodil Skjånes Dugstad, politician (died 2021).
- 30 May – Thor Knudsen, politician (died 2006)
- 4 June – Sigurd Verdal, politician (died 2010)
- 6 July – Finn Backer, judge (died 2015)
- 15 July – Håkon Brusveen, cross country skier and Olympic gold medallist (died 2021).
- 20 July – Asbjørn Sjøthun, politician (died 2010)

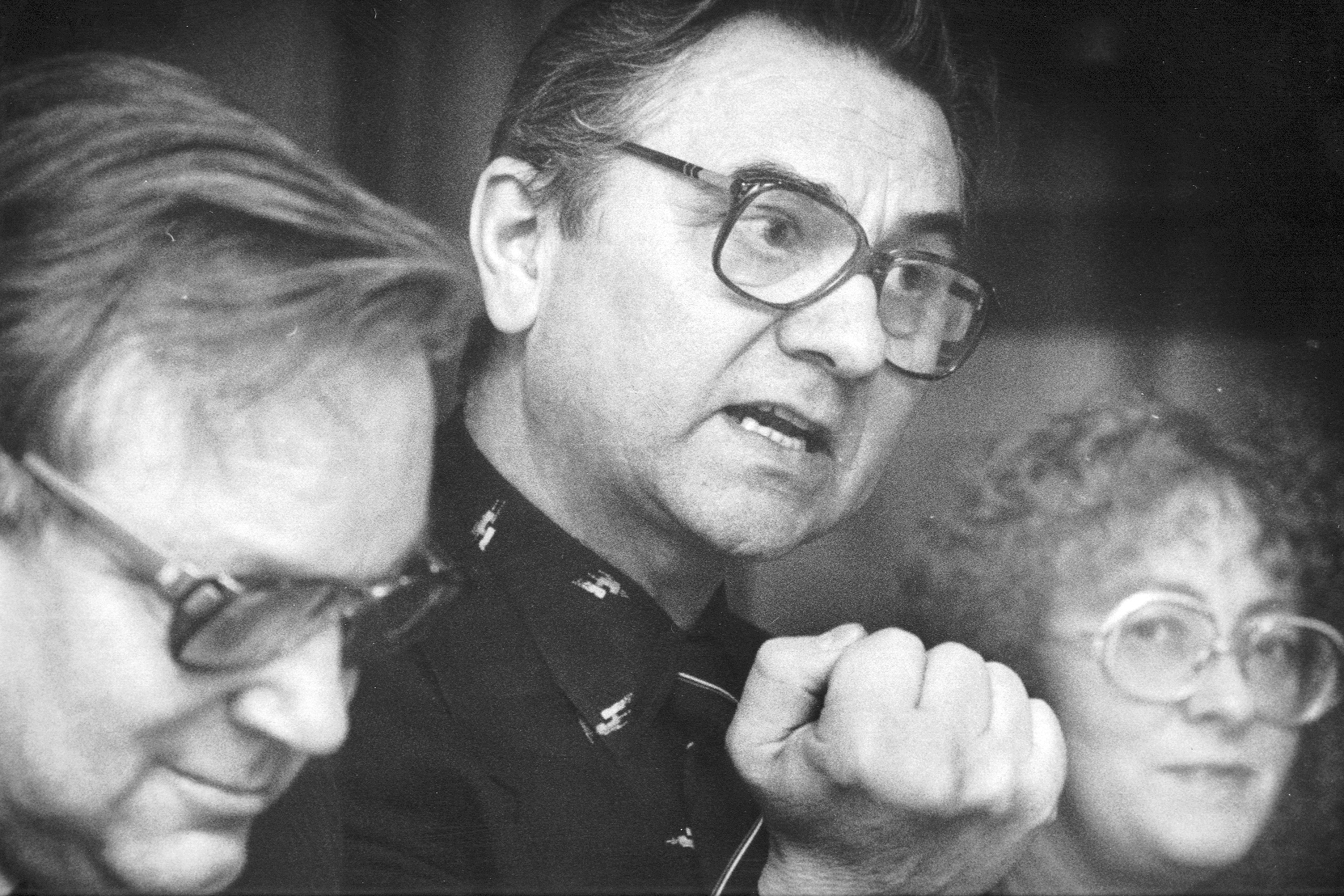
Asbjørn Sjøthun in the middle

- 2 August
  - Fredrik Bull-Hansen, military officer (died 2018)
  - Willy Haugli, jurist and Oslo chief of police (died 2009).
- 10 August – Eivind Eckbo, politician, lawyer and farmer (died 2017)
- 17 August – Gunnar Gravdahl, politician (died 2015)
- 20 August – Ole Vatnan, civil servant.
- 2 September – Hans Frette, politician (died 1989)
- 16 September – Gina Sigstad, cross country skier (died 2015)
- 26 September – Rolv Hellesylt, judge
- 27 September – Egil Bakke, civil servant (died 2022)
- 28 September – Jorunn Bjørg Giske, politician (died 2021).
- 8 October – Torbjørn Falkanger, ski jumper (died 2013).
- 3 November – Odvar Nordli, politician and Prime Minister of Norway (died 2018).
- 4 November – Målfrid Floan Belbo, politician (died 2019)
- 5 November – Benn John Valsø, bobsledder (died 1995).
- 8 November – Ingrid Bjoner, opera singer (died 2006)
- 8 November – Kåre Øistein Hansen, politician (died 2012).
- 30 November – Kjell Venås, philologist (died 2018).
- 5 December – Per Gjelten, Nordic skier (died 1991).
- 11 December – Stein Eriksen, alpine skier, Olympic gold medallist and World Champion (died 2015).
- 11 December – Trygve Moe, journalist (died 2025)
- 15 December – Ole N. Hoemsnes, journalist (died 2023)
- 21 December – Åge Hovengen, politician (died 2018).
- 22 December – Norvald Tveit, writer and playwright (died 2022).
- 27 December – Odd Hoftun, engineer and missionary (died 2023).

== Notable deaths ==
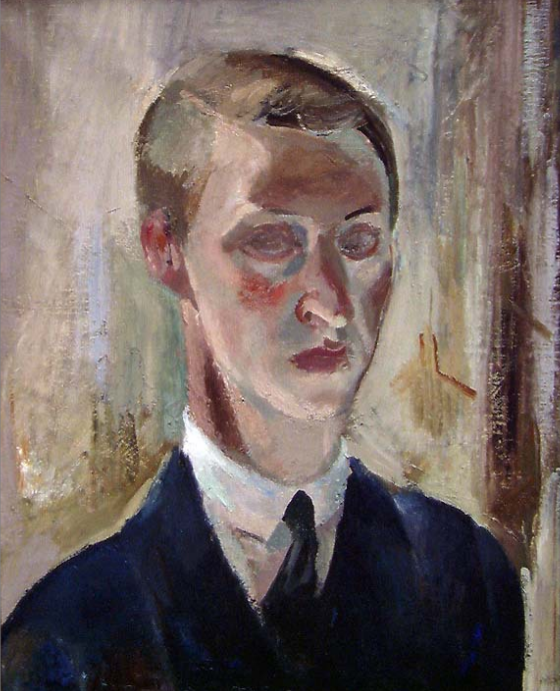
Bjarne Ness (self portrait)

- 14 February – Hermann Hansen Aarsrud, politician (born 1837).
- 22 March – Ingebrigt Vik, sculptor (born 1867)
- 9 April – Georg Ossian Sars, marine biologist (born 1837)
- 11 April – Anna Schønheyder, painter and textile artist (born 1877).
- 23 April – Ingeborg Belling, actress (born 1848).
- 25 July – Christian Fredrik Michelet, politician and Minister (born 1863)
- 7 September – Bernhard Brænne, politician and Minister (born 1854)
- October – Adolf Nilsen, rower and Olympic bronze medallist (born 1895)
- 1 October – Johan Friele, sailor and Olympic gold medallist (born 1866)
- 4 November – Ole Olsen, organist, composer, conductor and military musician (born 1850)
- 11 November – Kristian Prestrud, polar explorer (born 1881)
- 8 December – Hjalmar August Schiøtz, ophthalmologist (born 1850)
- 13 December – Bjarne Ness, painter and illustrator (born 1902).
- 25 December – Oskar Omdal, Norwegian Navy pilot (born 1895)

=== Full date unknown ===
- Christian Bjelland I, businessperson (born 1858)
