= 1930 in Norway =

- Centuries: 18th; 19th; 20th; 21st
- Decades: 1910s; 1920s; 1930s; 1940s; 1950s
- See also: List of years in Norway

Events in the year 1930 in Norway.

== Incumbents ==
- Monarch – Haakon VII.
- Prime Minister – Johan Ludwig Mowinckel

== Events ==
- 27 February – Jan Mayen was made de jure a part of Norway.
- 12 November – Norway relinquishes its claim to the Sverdrup Islands.
- Having established two years earlier, what is to become Norway's largest industrial park at Herøya outside Porsgrunn, Norsk Hydro opens up its first plant in this location.
- The 1930 Parliamentary election takes place.

== Popular culture ==
=== Literature ===
- The Knut Hamsund novel August Volume 1 & 2, was published.

== Notable births ==
=== January to June ===
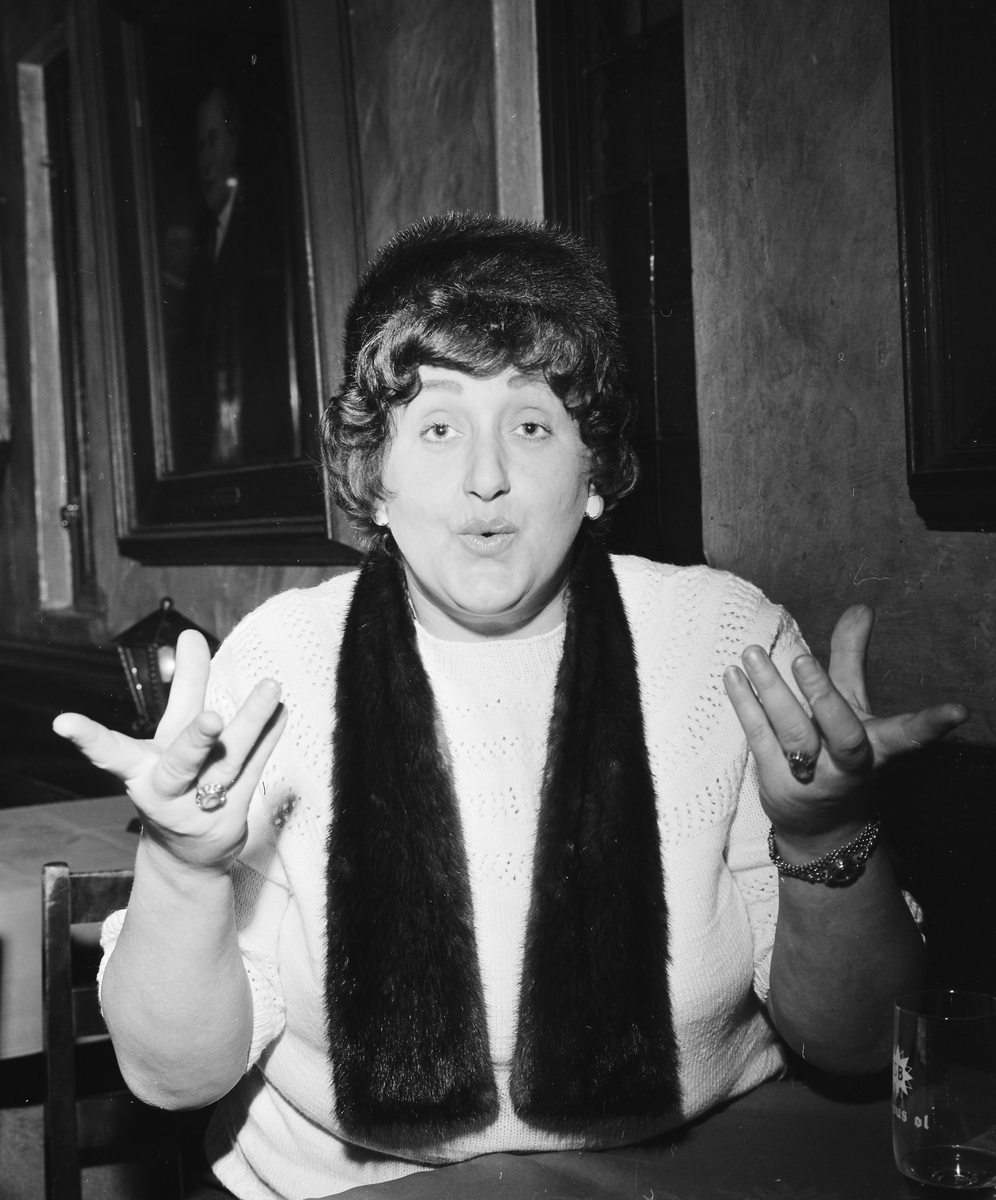
Elisabeth Grannemann

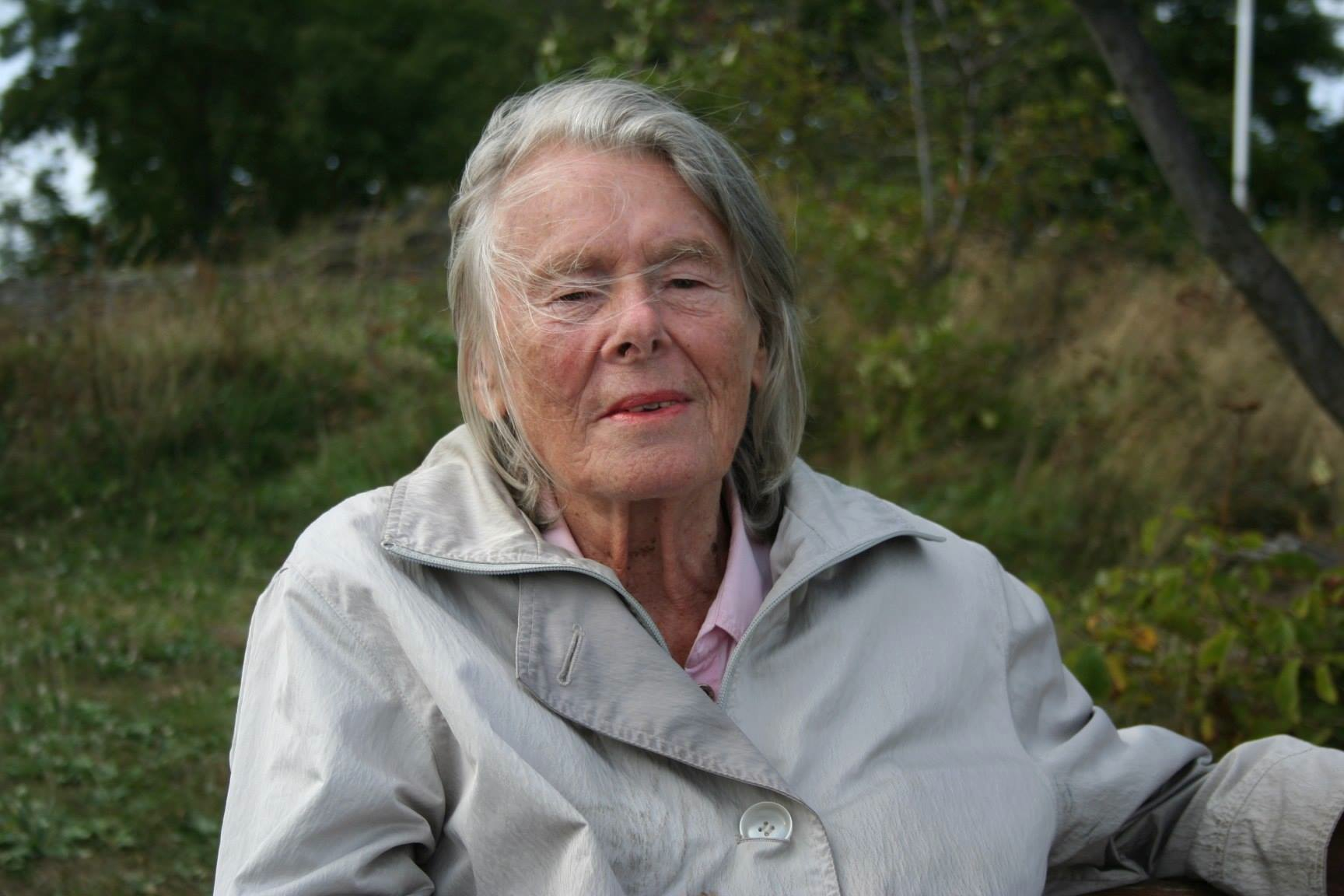
Annasif Døhlen

- 9 January – Tone Groven Holmboe, composer and teacher (died 2020)
- 12 January
  - Per Andersen, neuroscientist (died 2020)
  - Viking Mestad, banker and politician (died 2013)
- 28 January – Camilla Carlson, writer (died 1990).
- 6 February – Rikard Olsvik, politician (died 2017)
- 7 February – Odd Selmer, journalist and writer (died 2024).
- 11 February – Egil Gade Greve, banker (died 2025).
- 27 February – Birger Vestermo, cross-country skier (died 2025).
- 30 March – Petter Fauchald, footballer (died 2013)
- 8 April – Kåre Lunden, historian (died 2013)
- 28 April – Paul Hilmar Jenson, philatelist (died 2004)
- 6 May – Kjell Bækkelund, pianist (died 2004)
- 10 May – Jens Bugge, judge (died 2014)
- 11 May – Elisabeth Granneman, actress, singer and songwriter (died 1992).
- 29 May – Liv Stubberud, politician (died 1997)
- 21 June
  - Arnor Njøs, soil researcher (died 2019)
  - Trygve Reenskaug, computer scientist
- 23 June – Annasif Døhlen, sculptor (died 2021).

=== July to December ===
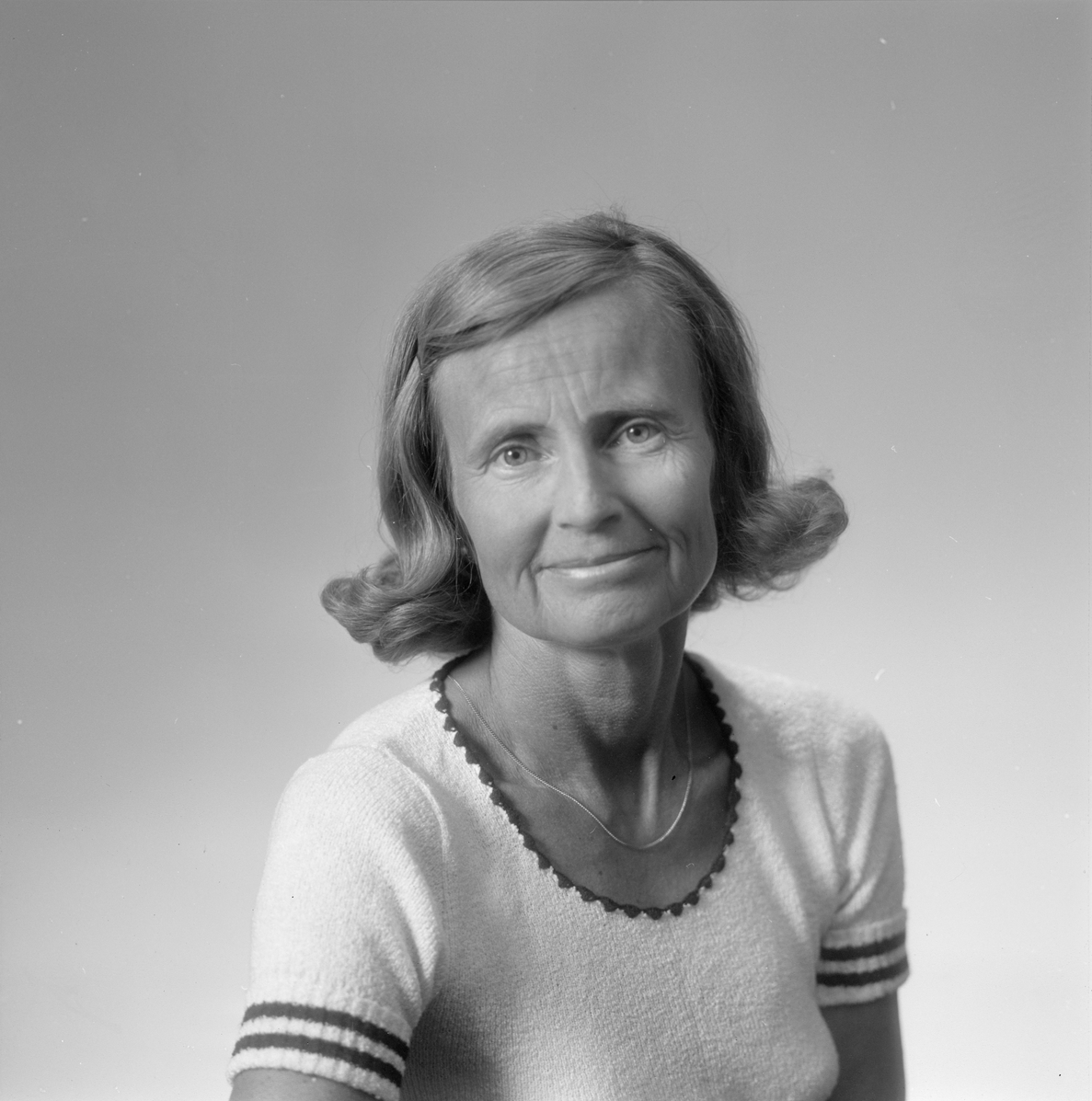
Aase Foss Abrahamsen

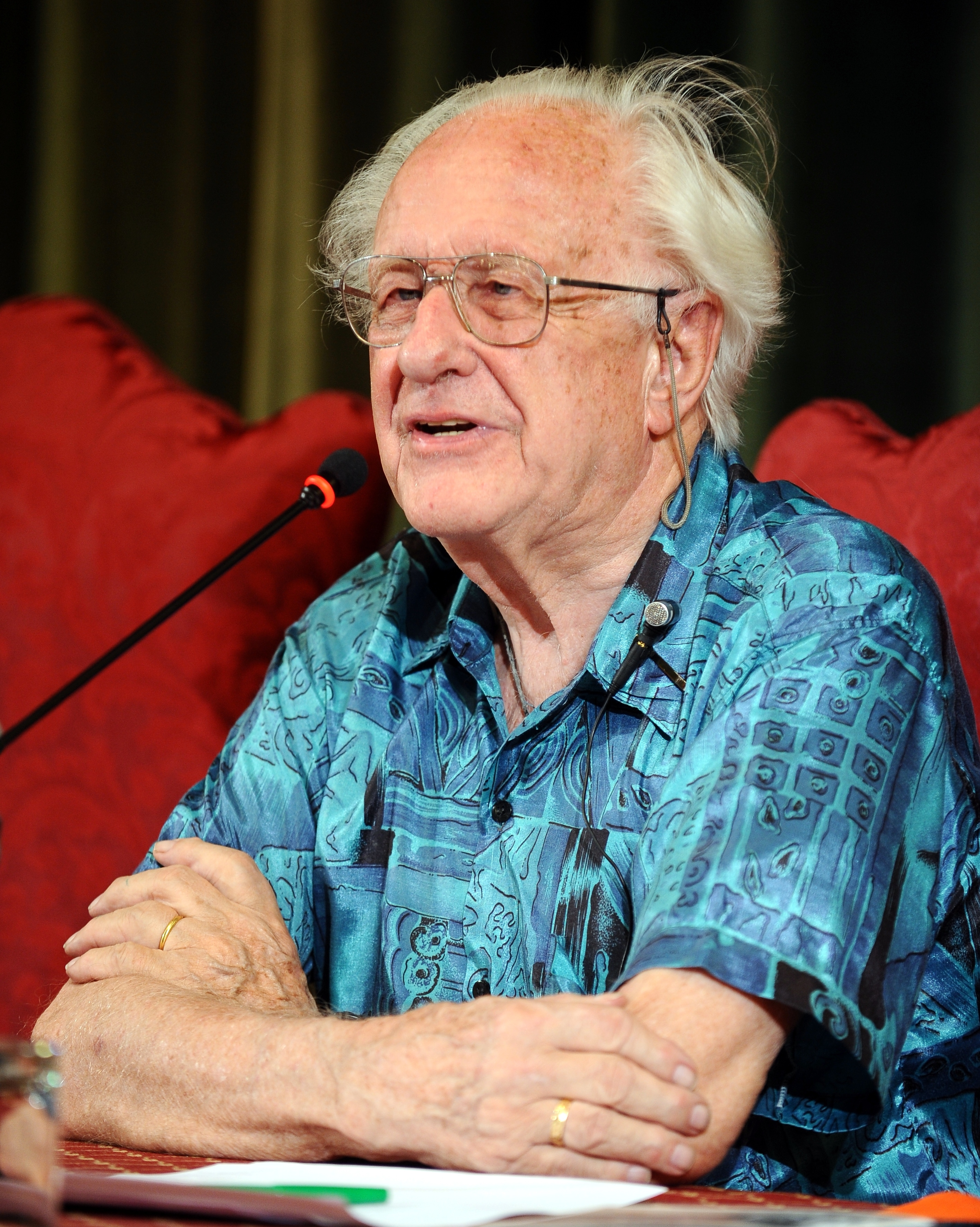
Johan Galtung

- 4 July – Thea Knutzen, politician (died 2016)
- 9 July
  - Elsa Lystad, actress (died 2023).
  - Håkon Randal, politician (died 2012)
- 13 July – Roar Høyland, industrial designer (died 2022).
- 7 August – Gunnar Ellefsen, politician (died 1997)
- 10 August – Axel Buch, politician (died 1998)
- 11 August – Arne Vinje Gunnerud, sculptor (died 2007).
- 23 August – Rut Tellefsen, actress.
- 27 August – Aase Foss Abrahamsen, children's writer (died 2023).
- 7 September – Olav Sigurd Carlsen, politician (died 2013)
- 12 September – Gunder Gundersen, Nordic combined skier and sports official (died 2005)
- 16 October – Hans Andreas Ihlebæk, journalist (died 1993)
- 19 October – Vesla Vetlesen, politician and minister (died 2024).
- 24 October – Johan Galtung, sociologist
- 30 October – Sjur Hopperstad, politician (died 2015)
- 20 November – Kjell Storvik, economist and former Governor of the Central Bank of Norway
- 24 November – Tor Halvorsen, trade unionist, politician and minister (died 1987)
- 18 December – Tor Hagfors, scientist, radio astronomer and radar expert (died 2007)
- 19 December – Knut Helle, historian and professor (died 2015).
- 19 December – Hans Stenberg-Nilsen, jurist and Supreme Court attorney (died 2025).
- 20 December – Jan Elgarøy, organist and composer (died 2018)
- 22 December – Per Bredesen, international soccer player (died 2022)
- 30 December – Sigfrid Mohn, politician (died 2015)

== Notable deaths ==
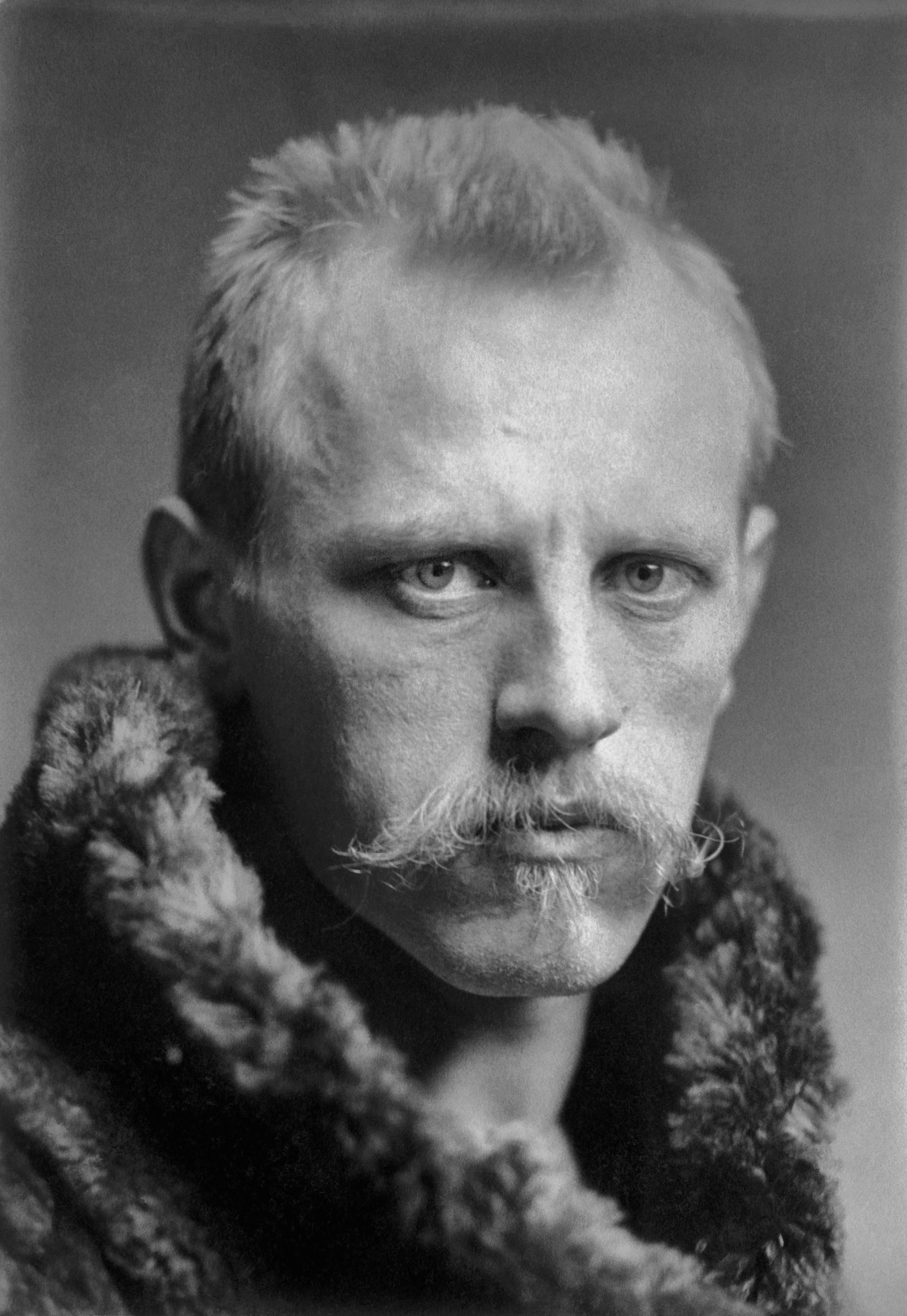
Fridtjof Nansen

- 7 January – Jacob Breda Bull, author (born 1853)
- 10 February – Mons Monssen, sailor in the United States Navy who received the Medal of Honor (born 1867)
- 12 February – Oddmund Vik, politician (born 1858)
- 24 February – Christian Theodor Holtfodt, politician (born 1863)
- 2 March – Marta Sandal, singer (born 1878)
- 14 April – Sigurd Ibsen, author and politician (born 1859)
- 13 May – Fridtjof Nansen, explorer, scientist and diplomat, awarded the Nobel Peace Prize in 1922 (born 1861)
- 5 October – Haaken L. Mathiesen, landowner and businessperson (born 1858)
- 14 October – Wilhelm Christian Magelssen, politician and Minister (born 1867)
- 26 November – Otto Sverdrup, Arctic scientist and explorer (born 1854)
- 9 December – Lauritz Christiansen, sailor and Olympic gold medallist (born 1867)
- 29 December – Oscar Borg, composer (born 1851)

=== Full date unknown ===
- Kristofer Kristofersson Hjeltnes, horticulturist and politician (born 1856)
