= Lysne =

Lysne is a surname of Norwegian origin. Notable people with the surname include:

- Anders Lysne (1926–2015), Norwegian educator
- Anders Olson Lysne (1764–1803), Norwegian farmer
- Geir Lysne (born 1965), Norwegian jazz musician
- Jo David Meyer Lysne (born 1994), Norwegian guitarist and composer
- Per Lysne (1880–1947), Norwegian-American artist
