= Leiv =

Leiv is a masculine given name, a Norwegian spelling variant of Leif. Persons so-named include:

- Leiv Amundsen (1898–1987), Norwegian librarian and philologist
- Leiv Blakset (1928–2005), Norwegian farmer, teacher and politician
- Leiv Erdal (1915–2009), Norwegian military officer, bailiff and politician
- Leiv Harang (1902–1970), Norwegian physicist
- Leiv Heggstad (1879–1954), Norwegian educator, linguist and translator
- Leiv Kjøllmoen (1930–2015), Norwegian politician
- Leiv Kreyberg (1896–1984), Norwegian pathologist and university professor
- Leiv Lunde (1961–2022), Norwegian political scientist and politician
- Leiv Mjeldheim (1929–2011), Norwegian historian
- Leiv Nergaard (born 1944), Norwegian businessperson
- Leiv Stensland (1934–2020), Norwegian politician
- Leiv Kristen Sydnes (born 1948), Norwegian chemist
- Leiv Magnus Vidvei (1923–2016), Norwegian economist, civil servant and politician
