= Leif =

- Pronunciation: English: /ˈlaɪf/ or /ˈleɪf/
- Gender: Male

Origin
- Origin: Scandinavian
- Meaning: Heir, descendant

Other names
- Related names: Elof, Olaf, Lafe

Leif is a male given name of Scandinavian origin. It is derived from the Old Norse name Leifr (nominative case), meaning "heir", "descendant".

== Use in the Nordic countries ==
=== Spelling and prevalence ===
Across the Nordic countries, the most commonly occurring spelling of the name is Leif, however, there are some well-established regional variants:

- Norway – Leiv
- Denmark – Lejf
- Iceland – Leifur [ˈleiːvʏr̥]
- Faroe Islands – Leivur [ˈlaɪvʊɹ]

In Norway, about 17,000 men have Leif as their first (or only) name. In Sweden, as of 2021, 62,147 men have the name Leif as a first name. As of 2018, about 15,000 Danish men have Leif as their first name. In Finland, as of 2012, 4,628 men have Leif as a first name. In the U.S., as of 2015, 6,415 men have Leif as a first name.

=== Pronunciation ===
Because the Scandinavian languages differ in their pronunciation of the digraphs ⟨ei⟩ and ⟨ej⟩, the name Leif may be either pronounced as an approximate rhyme for "safe", or approximately like the English word "life". In Sweden, Finland, Iceland and Western Norway, it is an approximate rhyme with "safe". In Denmark, much of Norway, and the southern and western regions of the Faroe Islands, the name is pronounced more like "life", while the only exception to this pattern is in the northern and eastern regions of the Faroe Islands where it is an approximate rhyme with the English word "coif". In no Scandinavian region is the name pronounced like the commonly heard English language pronunciation, "leaf", as that would be a homophone of the unrelated female name Liv/Lif.

== People ==
- Leif Ove Andsnes (born 1970), Norwegian pianist and exponent of Edvard Grieg
- Leif Arrhenius (born 1986), American-Swedish athlete
- Leif Axmyr (1938–2018), Swedish murderer
- Leif Bergdahl (born 1941), Swedish physician and politician
- Leif Blomberg (1941–1998), Swedish trade unionist and politician
- Leif Bodin (born 1996), German politician
- Leif Davidsen (born 1950), Danish crime fiction writer
- Leif Davis (born 1999), English footballer
- Leif Erikson (c. 970 – c. 1020), Norse explorer regarded as having discovered North America before Christopher Columbus
- Leif Garrett (born 1961), Norwegian-American singer and actor
- Leif Hård (born 1944), Swedish politician
- Leif Hoste (born 1977), Belgian road cyclist
- Leif Juster (1910–1995), Norwegian comedian, actor and singer.
- Leif Larsen (1906–1990) Norwegian sailor and the most highly decorated allied naval officer of World War II
- Leif Leifland (1925–2015), Swedish diplomat
- Leif Linde (born 1955), Swedish politician
- Leif Nysmed (born 1970), Swedish politician
- Leif Öhrvall (1897–1985), Swedish diplomat
- Leif Olsen (1927–2012), Norwegian footballer
- Leif Panduro (1923–1977), Danish novelist and dramatist
- Leif G. W. Persson (born 1945), Swedish criminologist, whistle-blower and novelist
- Leif Roschberg (1909–1967), Norwegian dancer, actor, and painter
- Leif Segerstam (1944–2024), Finnish conductor and composer
- Leif Shiras (born 1959), American tennis player
- Leif Silbersky (1938–2024), Swedish lawyer and author
- Leif Tronstad (1903–1945), Norwegian scientist, intelligence officer and military organizer
- Leif Vollebekk, Canadian singer-songwriter
