= Tveito =

Tveito is a surname. Notable people with the surname include:

- Aslak Tveito (born 1961), Norwegian scientist
- Dagfinn Tveito (1927–2015), Norwegian magazine editor
- Einar Tveito (1890–1958), Norwegian actor
