= Kvalø =

Kvalø is a Norwegian surname. Notable people with the surname include:

- Jorunn Kvalø (born 1975), Norwegian racing cyclist
- Steiner Arvid Kvalø (1922–2015), Norwegian Labour Party politician
