= Sjølie =

Sjølie is a surname. Notable people with the surname include:

- David Aleksander Sjølie (born 1988), Norwegian jazz guitarist
- Martin Sjølie (born 1979), Norwegian songwriter and record producer
- Ole Sjølie (1923–2015), Norwegian painter
