= Fauchald =

Fauchald is a Norwegian surname. Notable people with the surname include:

- Peder Jensen Fauchald (1791–1856), Norwegian politician
- Petter Fauchald (1930–2013), Norwegian footballer
