= Dietrichson =

Dietrichson is a surname. Notable people with the surname include:

- Espen Dietrichson (born 1976), Norwegian artist
- Gustav Dietrichson (1855–1922), Norwegian theologian and bishop
- Jan W. Dietrichson (born 1927), Norwegian philologist
- Johannes Wilhelm Christian Dietrichson (1815–1883), Norwegian Lutheran minister
- Lorentz Dietrichson (1834–1917), Norwegian poet and historian of art and literature
- Oluf Christian Dietrichson (1856–1942), Norwegian explorer and military officer
- Phyllis Dietrichson, fictional character in the two film adaptations of James M. Cain's novella Double Indemnity

== See also ==
- Dietrich
