= Egil Toreng =

Norwegian politician

Ottar Egil Toreng (5 December 1922 – 8 January 2015) was a Norwegian newspaper editor and politician.

He was born in Kristiania, and grew up in Flisa. He became a journalist in Glåmdalen during the second world war, and was promoted to sub-editor in 1954. From 1961 to 1962 he worked with information in the Norwegian Labour Party. He was a member of the municipal council for Kongsvinger Municipality from 1952 to 1963. He became news editor in Glåmdalen in 1962, and was their editor-in-chief from 1968 to 1986. He was a deputy representative to the Parliament of Norway during the term 1958–1961.

Toreng was a national board member of the Labour Party from 1973 to 1981, headed Arbeiderpressens Samvirke from 1975 to 1979 and the Association of Norwegian Editors from 1978 to 1982, and chaired the Norwegian News Agency's board of directors from 1980 to 1987. He was succeeded in the latter position by Svein Døvle Larssen. He has also written books, among others on Kongsvinger IL's history. He died in 2015.
