= Thor-Erik Lundby =

Norwegian ice hockey player

Thor-Erik Lundby (March 5, 1937 – September 6, 2015) was a Norwegian ice hockey player. He played for the Norwegian national ice hockey team, and participated at the Winter Olympics in 1964, where he placed tenth with the Norwegian team.
