= Fritz C. Holte =

Norwegian economist

Fritz Christian Holte (24 March 1925 – 17 January 2015) was a Norwegian economist.

He was born in Tromsø, and was hired at the Norwegian College of Agriculture in 1954. He took his doctorate in 1962 and served as professor from 1974 to 1990. Books include Sosialøkonomi (1965, later reissued) and Økonomi og samfunn (1978, later reissued).
