= Nils Bølset =

Norwegian diplomat (1928–2015)

Nils Bølset (23 July 1928 – 18 August 2015) was a Norwegian diplomat.

He was born in Veøy Municipality, was a cand.jur. by education and started working for the Norwegian Ministry of Foreign Affairs in 1954. He served at the embassy in West Germany from 1979 to 1985, and the following three years he was back in Norway as a special adviser in the Ministry of Foreign Affairs. He was the Norwegian ambassador to Turkey from 1989 to 1992 and Australia from 1992 to 1998 before serving as a legal adviser the rest of his life. He died in August 2015 in Asker Municipality.
