= Jorunn Bjørg Giske =

Norwegian politician (1927–2021)

- Born: 28 September 1927; Giske Municipality, Norway
- Died: 21 January 2021 (aged 93)
- Occupation: Politician
- Political party: Labour Party of Norway

Jorunn Bjørg Giske (28 September 1927 – 21 January 2021) was a Norwegian politician for the Labour Party.

== Career ==
Giske was born in Giske Municipality to farmer Bjarne Berntsen Giske and Nikoline Valkvæ. She served as deputy representative to the Storting from Møre og Romsdal during the term 1973–1977. She met during 90 days of parliamentary session.

Giske was elected to the municipal council of Halden Municipality from 1955 to 1959, and to the municipal council of Trondheim Municipality from 1971 to 1983. From 1977 to 1978 she was a board member of the Norwegian Labour Party. She was a board member of the Hotel and Restaurant Workers' Union from 1955 to 1959, and district secretary for the union in Trondheim from 1960 to 1987. From 1975 to 1984 she was board member of the Norwegian Association of Local and Regional Authorities.

Giske died on 21 January 2021.
