= Fredrik Grønvold =

Norwegian physicist

Fredrik Christian Grønvold (16 June 1924 – 24 October 2015) was a Norwegian chemist.

Born in Oslo, he finished his secondary education at Oslo Cathedral School in 1943. He studied at the University of Oslo before receiving a scholarship to take the master of science degree at the University of Michigan in 1951. He was appointed as an associate professor at the University of Oslo in 1952, specializing in inorganic chemistry. He was promoted to docent in 1959 and professor in 1985. He was inducted into the Norwegian Academy of Science and Letters in 1988.

Grønvold was also a board member of the Norwegian Industrial Property Office. He died at Bærum Hospital in October 2015, aged 91.
