= Bjørn Andressen =

Norwegian ice hockey player

Bjørn Andressen (also spelled Andreassen, 8 September 1946 – 27 January 2015) was a Norwegian ice hockey player. He was born in Oslo and represented the club Jar IL. He played for the Norwegian national ice hockey team, and participated at the Winter Olympics in Sapporo in 1972, where the Norwegian team placed 8th.
