= Theodor Borchgrevink =

Norwegian engineer (1923–2015)

Theodor Borchgrevink (16 February 1923 – 2 December 2015) was a Norwegian engineer of transport and highways. He worked in the United States during the advent of the Interstate Highway System, and returned to Norway in 1963 where he advanced to the upper echelon of the Norwegian Directorate of Public Roads.

== Early life and career ==
He was born in Brooklyn, New York, but grew up in Stabekk. He enrolled at the Norwegian Institute of Technology in 1941, but the studies were interrupted by World War II. Borchgrevink fled from occupied Norway to England via Sweden, and was enrolled in the Royal Norwegian Air Force-in-exile where he worked in Belgium and the Netherlands. In the last war phase he was a member of the Norwegian Independent Company 1. After the war he resumed his studies, and graduated from the construction department of the Institute of Technology in 1948. He then moved to the United States, where he worked with construction of the Interstate Highway System. He lived in Monroe, Connecticut, and was active in the local Republican Party.

== Later career ==
In 1962 he applied for the position as director of the Norwegian Directorate of Public Roads, and although he was among the strong candidates, the job was given to Karl Olsen. Nonetheless, he returned to Norway. From 1963 he headed the office which administered the northern part of the European route E6 in Oslo, a major project at the time. In 1967 he became head of the road department (Vegavdelingen), the third highest position in the Directorate of Public Roads. The name was changed to the administration department in 1971, and it absorbed the former planning department from 1972. Borchgrevink stepped down in 1984. From 1984 to 1992 he worked with road projects for the Directorate of Public Roads and the Norwegian Agency for Development Cooperation, in Kenya, Tanzania, Botswana and Madagascar.

He was married, and had four children. He resided at Stabekk for large parts of his life. He died in December 2015.
