= Per Arne Bjerke =

Norwegian journalist, radio presenter and politician

Per Arne Bjerke (24 March 1952 – 17 June 2015) was a Norwegian journalist, radio presenter and politician for the Labour Party.

He was an editor in Romerikes Blad, news editor in Dagsavisen and information director in the Ministry of Finance, but was best known for his time in the Norwegian Broadcasting Corporation where, from 2008 to his death, he presented the radio program Politisk kvarter. From 1990 to 1992 he served in Brundtland's Third Cabinet as State Secretary in the Office of the Prime Minister.
