= Martin Nag =

Norwegian translator (1927-2015)

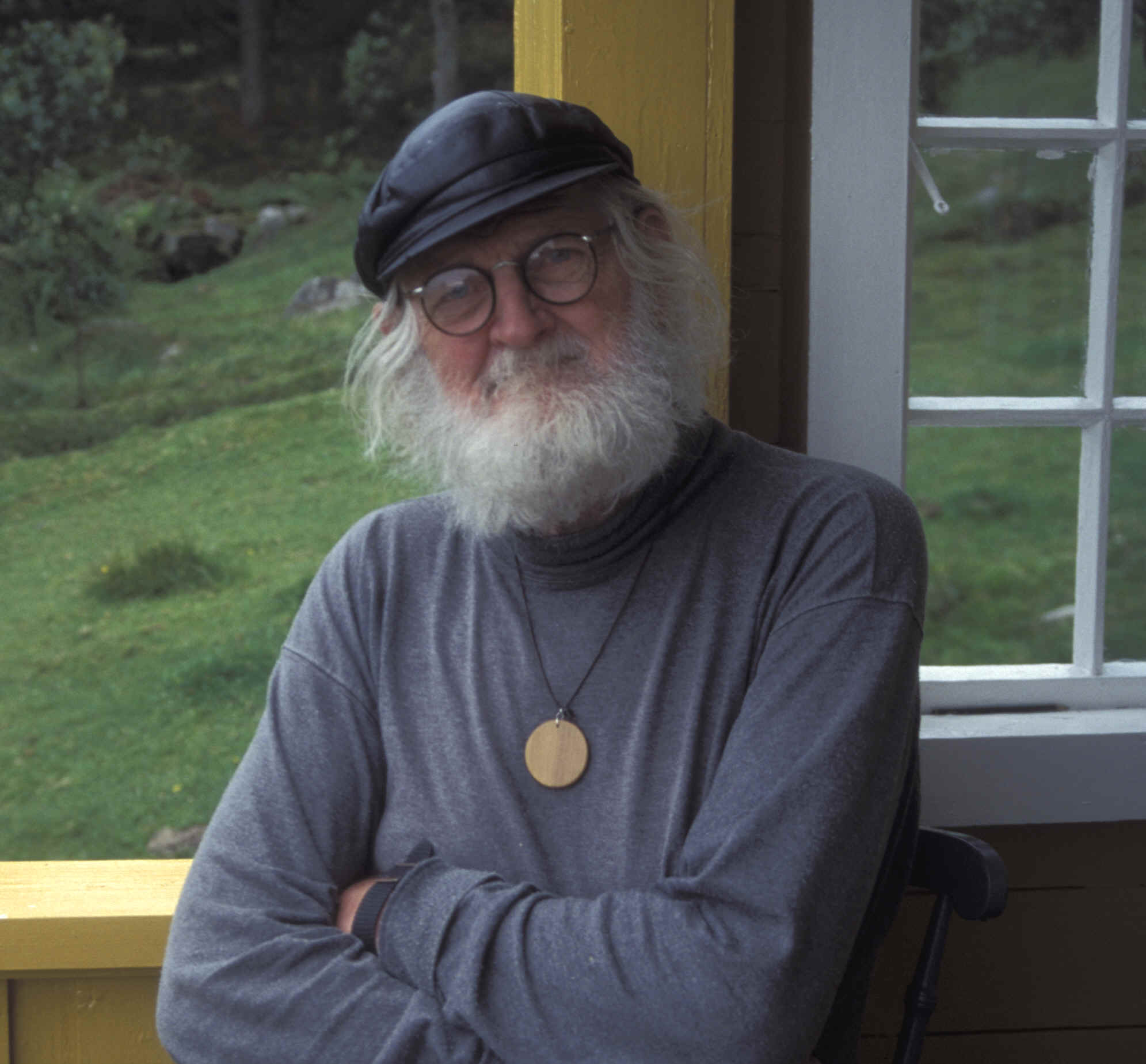
- Born: 30 July 1927; Stavanger, Norway
- Died: 2 May 2015 (aged 87)
- Occupations: literary historian, literary critic, poet, essayist, translator and biographer

Martin Gunnar Nag (30 July 1927 – 2 May 2015) was a Norwegian literary historian, literary critic, poet, essayist, translator and biographer. He was born in Stavanger.

He was a specialist on Slavic literature, and has translated Russian, Bulgarian and Czech literature into Norwegian language. Among his books are Uro, Rød lørdag from 1976 and Steingjerde from 1991. He has published works on Norwegian writers, such as Knut Hamsun, Sigbjørn Obstfelder, Rudolf Nilsen, Nordahl Grieg and Alexander Kielland, as well as Russian writers, including Dostoyevsky, Turgenev and Tolstoy. Not appointed to the academic position he desired, he was nonetheless a government scholar from 1987.

Nag issued his last book in the spring of 2015. He died in Oslo, Norway near the age of 88.
