= Inger-Marie Kristensen =

Norwegian politician (1932–2015)

Inger-Marie Kristensen, née Myreng (30 November 1932 – 13 August 2015) was a Norwegian politician for the Conservative Party.

She served as a deputy representative to the Parliament of Norway from Finnmark during the term 1969–1973. In total she served during 4 days of parliamentary session.

In December 1978, at the annual convention of Alta Conservative Party, she walked out and rescinded her 30-year party membership. The reason was the Alta controversy and that the Conservative Party endeavoured to construct hydroelectric plants and dams in the Alta river. The annual convention rejected to debate a letter of support and confidence to Conservative MP Inger-Lise Skarstein, who was among the few conservatives against damming. Kristensen started on a speech, but was cut off by the moderator and subsequently exited.

During her stint in Parliament, she had participated in a debate about the same matter, calling for a stop to the Alta river plans, and no dams that would submerge Masi. Kristensen had been elected chair of Alta Conservative Women in 1969.
