= Christian Backer-Owe =

Norwegian printmaker

Christian Lauritz Backer-Owe (20 November 1924 – 2 February 2015) was a Norwegian artist and printmaker.

He was born in Trondheim, and made his exhibition debut at Trondheim Kunstforening in 1944 before attending the Norwegian National Academy of Fine Arts from 1946 to 1948. He also studied under Fernand Léger in Paris in 1952.

Backer-Owe was first known as an autodidact jewel artist and miniature painter, later as a printmaker. In addition to his debut he had a separate exhibition at Kunstnerforbundet in 1978, and took part at Høstutstillingen in 1948, 1981, 1982 and 1984. His works have been bought by Nordenfjeldske Kunstindustrimuseum and the Arts Council Norway.

He resided at Hosle in Bærum. In the 1960s he was a minor ballot candidate for the Socialist People's Party. He died in February 2015.
