= Ivar Samset =

Norwegian forester

Ivar Samset (4 December 1918 – 29 June 2015) was a Norwegian forester.

He was born in Skien. He graduated from the Norwegian College of Agriculture in 1944, and was a professor at the Norwegian College of Agriculture and research director at the Norwegian Forest Research Institute from 1956 to 1988. In 1977 he received an honorary degree from the Swedish University of Agricultural Sciences. He was a fellow of the Norwegian Academy of Science and Letters. In 2004 he published the autobiography Storm gjennom skogene.
