= Leif Linde =

Swedish politician (born 1955)

Leif Linde (born 1955) is a Swedish politician who was the secretary general of the Swedish Social Democratic Party between 1994 and 1996. He has been board chairman of the Swedish Co-operative Union since April 2020.

== Biography ==
Linde was born in Nyköping in 1955. He was the union secretary in the Workers' Educational Association from 1988 to 1994. He was named as the secretary general of the Social Democratic Party in 1994, replacing Mona Sahlin in the post. His tenure ended in 1996 when Ingela Thalén was elected as the secretary general of the party. Between 1997 and 2004 he was director general of the youth board and between 2002 and 2007 he was a board member of the Swedish Consumer Agency. He was CEO and head of the consumers' association Svea between 2004 and 2006 and was the association director of the Swedish Co-operative Union from 2006 to 2012. He also served as the CEO of Swedish housing company in the period 2012–2020. In April 2020 he was elected as the board chairman of the Swedish Co-operative Union.

He also holds other posts such as chairman of the board of KFO and Fonus and is also a board member of Folksam Sak and chairman of its risk and capital committee.
