= Gunnar Ellefsen =

Norwegian politician

Gunnar Ellefsen (7 August 1930 – 12 April 1997) was a Norwegian politician for the Labour Party. He was educated as a teacher and was the principal (bestyrer, later rektor) of Mesterfjellet school 1967–1977.

Ellefsen served three terms as Vestfold's deputy representative to the Norwegian Parliament: 1961–1965, 1965–1969 and 1969–1973. He was the mayor of Larvik Municipality from 1972 to 1983.
