= Arild Rypdal =

Norwegian writer (1934–2015)

Arild Rypdal (23 September 1934 – 14 May 2015) was a Norwegian author, pilot and engineer. He is famous for his MI6 stories from England. He commonly uses many characters in a story without having a clear main character.
