= Trygve Kaldahl =

Norwegian agrarian leader

Trygve Kaldahl (16 February 1922 – 9 January 2015) was a Norwegian agrarian leader.

He was born in Klinga and took his education at Sem. He was hired in the Norwegian Farmers and Smallholders Union in 1950, and served as secretary-general from 1972 to 1981. During that time he held a multitude of positions in public boards and committees. From 1981 to his retirement in 1989 he was the managing director of the Market Office for Potatoes. He resided in Ski and died in January 2015.
