= Aase Foss Abrahamsen =

Norwegian children's writer (1930–2023)

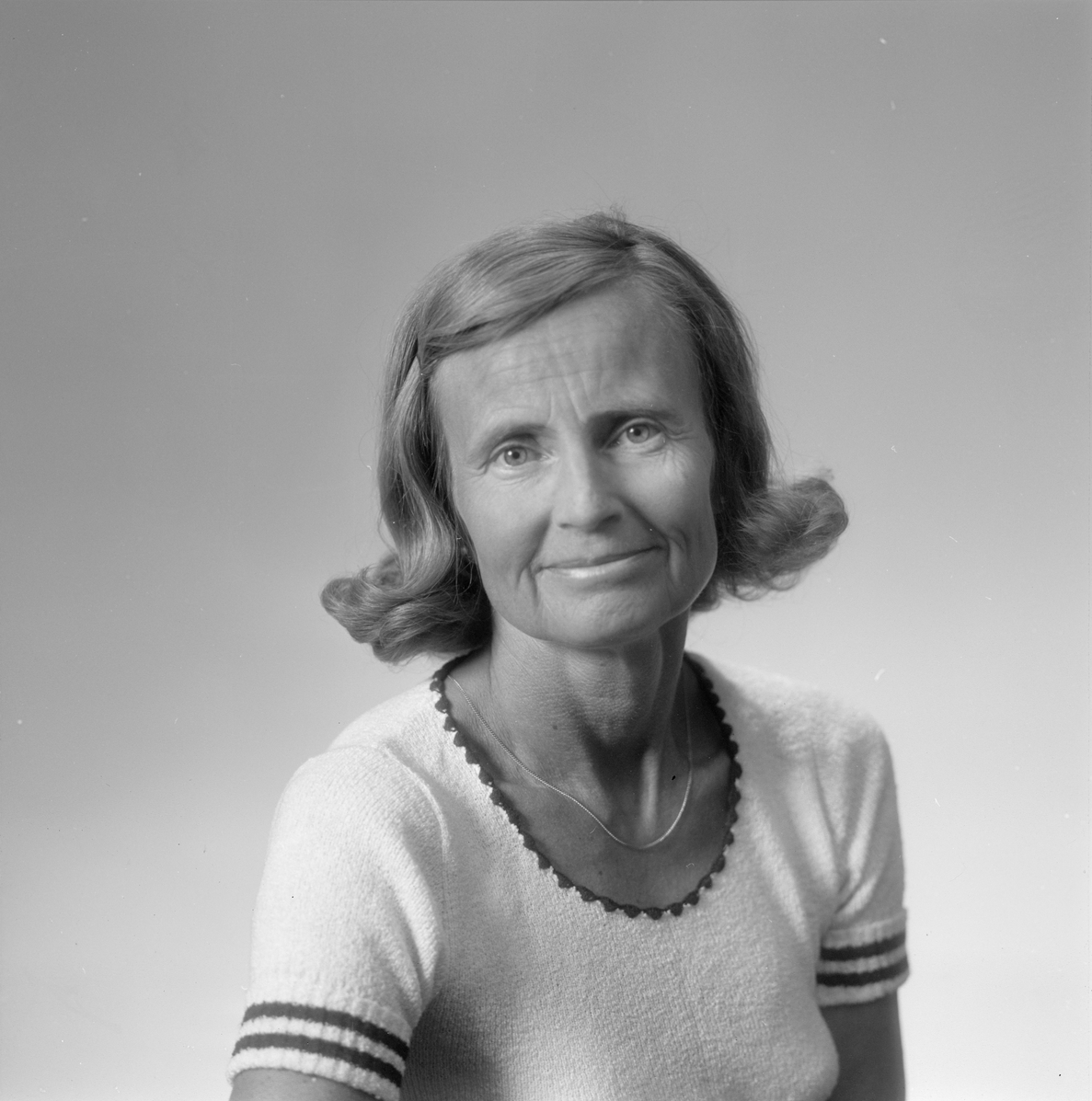
- Foss Abrahamsen in 1976
- Born: Aase Dommerud; 27 August 1930; Drammen, Norway
- Died: 7 May 2023 (aged 92); Bærum, Norway
- Education: University of Oslo (cand.philol.)
- Occupation: Writer
- Spouse: Arne Tellef Foss Abrahamsen (m. 1953)
- Children: 5

Aase Foss Abrahamsen (née Dommerud; 27 August 1930 – 7 May 2023) was a Norwegian writer. She primarily wrote for children and young adults, but also books for adults.

Her book Ikke deg denne gang from 1978 was awarded the Norwegian Ministry of Culture's prize for children's literature, and Videre lille kvinne from 1981 earned her the Damm prize. She received the cultural prize from the city of Sarpsborg in 1986.

== Early life and education ==
Aase Dommerud was born in Drammen on 27 August 1930, to editor Ole Aasten Dommerud and nurse Jenny Bakken. When she was eight, she moved with her family to Kristiansand. Her mother died when she was twelve.

Dommerud graduated as cand.philol. in history from the University of Oslo in 1956.

== Literary career ==
Foss Abrahamsen made her literary debut in 1971 with the children's book Håkon slalåmkjører ("Haakon the alpine skier"). Further books are Blomster fra Hiroshima ("Flowers from Hiroshima") from 1972, Kan ikke akkurat gå, men ... ("Can not really walk, but ...") (1974), and Hvis jeg kunne bestemme ("If I could rule") from 1977. Her 1978 book, Ikke deg denne gang ("Not you this time"), was awarded the Ministry of Culture's prize for children's literature and literature for young adults. The book handles about the love between Lene and Leif, who has contracted cancer and eventually dies. Videre lille kvinne ("Move on, little woman") from 1981 treats the subjects of unwanted pregnancy and abortion. The book was awarded Dammprisen from N. W. Damm & Søn. Her books for adults include For sterk, Birgitte ("Too strong, Birgitte") from 1982, Fuglen og den hvite duken ("The bird and the little cloth"), and Alltid de andre ("Always the others") from 1988.

In 1986 she was awarded the cultural prize from the city of Sarpsborg, for her literary works. Her books from the 1990s include Timian Love (1993), on reactions to a suicide attempt, Ingen vet ("Nobody knows") (1994), a collection of short stories for young adults, and Ingenmannsland ("No man's land") (1996), a short story collection for children.

Taking part in organizational work, Foss Abrahamsen was a member of the literary council of the Norwegian Writers for Children, as well as vice chair of the board. She also chaired the board of the Office for Norwegian Literature Abroad, NORLA.

== Personal life and death ==
Aase Dommerud married physician Arne Tellef Foss Abrahamsen in 1953, and together they had five children.

Foss Abrahamsen died in Bærum on 7 May 2023, at age 92.

== Selected works ==
- Håkon slalåmkjører (1971)
- Ikke deg denne gang (1978)
- Videre lille kvinne (1981)
- For sterk, Birgitte (1982)
- Fuglen og den hvite duken (1985)
- En dag med sol (1987)
- Alltid de andre (1988)
- Timian love (1993)
