= Rolv Hellesylt =

Norwegian judge (1927–2024)

Rolv Hellesylt (26 September 1927 – 19 January 2024) was a Norwegian judge. He was born in Sunnylven Municipality, and graduated with the cand.jur. degree in 1956. He then spent one year at New York University. He was hired in the Ministry of Justice and the Police in 1959, and was promoted to assisting secretary in 1969. He was then a city lawyer in Oslo from 1976 to 1979, before serving as a Supreme Court Justice from 1979 to 1997. He lived at Høvik.
