= John Olav Larssen =

Norwegian evangelical preacher and missionary

John Olav Larssen (7 March 1927 – 2 January 2009) was a Norwegian evangelical preacher and missionary.

He was born in Hellvik, and settled in Bryne. He started as a preacher at the age of eighteen, and eventually began touring Norway. He has been nicknamed "Norway's Billy Graham". Books written by Larssen include En åpen dør (1957), Elsket av Gud (1961), Fra høvelbenk til misjonsmark (1964), Kraft fra det høye (1968), and Gud vil vekkelse (1970).
