= Kjell Arnljot Wig =

Norwegian media personality

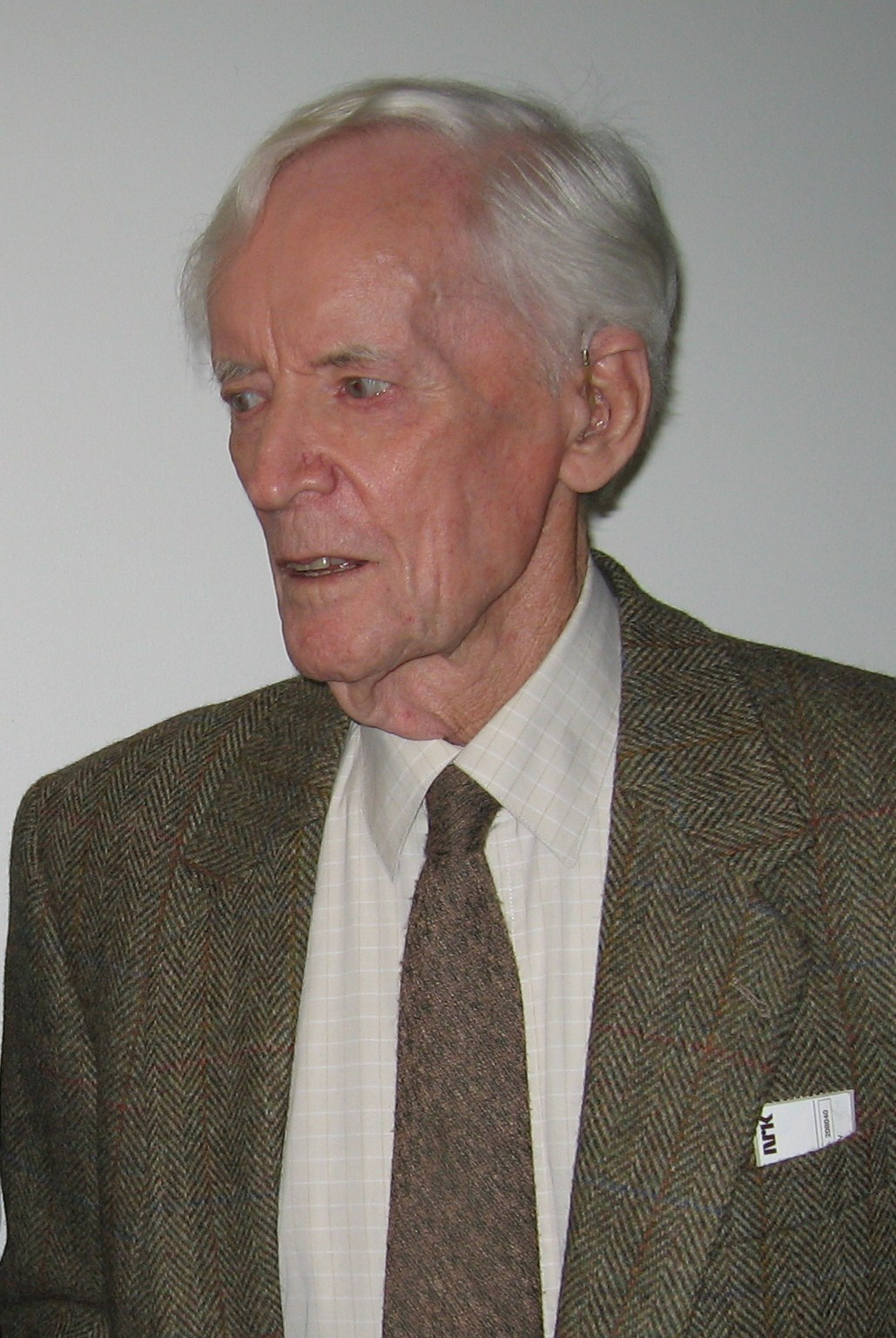
- Born: 31 December 1924; Stjørdal Municipality
- Died: 18 January 2015 (aged 90); Bærum Municipality
- Occupation: Journalist
- Employer: Norwegian Broadcasting Corporation

Kjell Arnljot Wig (31 December 1924 – 18 January 2015) was a Norwegian media personality. He was born in Stjørdal Municipality and died in Bærum Municipality. He was a journalist for Morgenbladet from 1948, and was assigned with the Norwegian Broadcasting Corporation from 1963 to 1992. He hosted a series of television shows, including Aktuell debatt, Vindu mot verden and Åpen post. Among his books are Det skjulte Norge from 1969, Kongen ser tilbake from 1977, and Eventyret om Blaafarveværket from 1995.
