= Arne Gunnarsjaa =

Norwegian architect

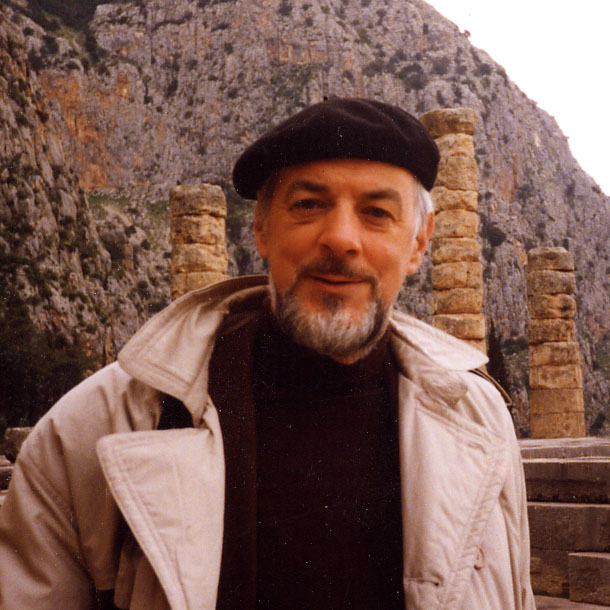
- Arne Gunnarsjaa at Delphi in 1994

Personal details
- Born: September 25, 1939 Sandvika, Akershus, Norway
- Died: August 26, 2015 (aged 75) Trondheim, Trøndelag, Norway

Arne Kjell Gunnarsjaa (1939–2015) was a Norwegian architect and author.

== Career ==
Between 1962 and 1967 Gunnarsjaa studied at an international branch campus of the University of Oslo in Rome, and served as assistant to Profs. Christian Norberg-Schulz and Hjalmar Torp. Gunnarsjaa, who spoke fluent Italian, developed a deep understanding of Italian culture.

In 1999, Gunnarsjaa completed his Arkitekturleksikon, a monumental book on architectural history and technique covering around 7000 topics. The Arkitekturleksikon was published in 2007. His other publications include Arkitekturhistorie (2001) and Norges arkitekturhistorie (2006).

Gunnarsjaa's final project was his leadership of the Nidaros Cathedral Restoration Workshop (Norwegian: Nidaros Domkirkes Restaureringsarbeider, NDR) from 1989 to 2006. He died in 2015.

== See also ==
- Nidaros Cathedral
