= Målfrid Floan Belbo =

Norwegian politician (1927–2019)

Målfrid Floan Belbo (4 November 1927 – 3 June 2019) was a Norwegian politician for the Centre Party.

Belbo served as a deputy representative to the Parliament of Norway from Nord-Trøndelag during the terms 1969–1973 and 1973–1977. She met during 23 days of parliamentary session.
