= Svein B. Manum =

Norwegian palaeobotanist and palynologist (1926–2015)

Svein Bendik Manum (3 October 1926 – 30 September 2015) was a Norwegian palaeobotanist and palynologist who pioneered the study of pre‑Quaternary palynology in Norway. Over a career spanning more than five decades at the University of Oslo and in international appointments, he made foundational contributions to the biostratigraphy of dinoflagellate cysts, Arctic palaeofloras and the application of palynology to petroleum geology.

== Early life and education ==
Svein Bendik Manum was born in Askim, Østfold, on 3 October 1926 to Ivar Rui Manum and Anna Walborg, who ran a local grocery shop. He completed his secondary schooling in Askim in 1945 and enrolled at the University of Oslo the following year, graduating in 1950 with degrees in botany, mathematics and physics. Under the supervision of Professor Ove Arbo Høeg, Manum undertook the first postgraduate thesis on pre‑Quaternary palynology in Norway—a study of Paleogene coal deposits from Spitsbergen—earning his Candidatus realium in 1953. He married Randi Hafting in 1953, and the couple had three children: Ivar, Ketil and Kari.

== Career and research ==
After completing his Candidatus realium, Manum continued as a research assistant and expanded his sampling to other high‑latitude coal deposits in Alaska, Arctic Canada, Greenland and Iceland. He defended his PhD on the Tertiary flora of Spitsbergen, Ellesmere Island, Greenland and Iceland on 24 November 1962, becoming an associate professor at Oslo later that year. Promoted to full professor in 1982, he remained on the University of Oslo faculty until his retirement in 1995, serving as head of the Department of Geology on four occasions.

Manum's research pioneered methods for extracting and photographing palynomorphs, and he collaborated internationally with Isabel Cookson on dinoflagellate cyst biostratigraphy, resulting in the description of new taxa. He applied palynology to petroleum exploration, supervising the first Paleogene–Neogene palynomorph zonation for offshore Norway using Deep Sea Drilling Project Leg 38 material. His work also encompassed the palaeobotany of Arctic macrofloras, the identification of fossil clitellate cocoons and extensive mentorship of postgraduate students across palaeoecology and applied stratigraphy.

During her 1959–60 sojourn in Oslo, Cookson offered to process Manum's Arctic shale samples, leading to the discovery and description of the distinctive bicavate dinocyst Svalbardella cooksoniae Manum 1960 (named by Manum in her honour) by examining material from Graham Island.

== Personal life and legacy ==
Manum resided in Lommedalen. Following his retirement in 1995, Manum remained scientifically active until shortly before his death, contributing to outreach articles and attending the opening of a new palynology laboratory at Oslo in 2014. He pursued diverse interests in art, photography, literature and gardening, and cared for his wife Randi during her final years. Manum died on 30 September 2015 at the age of 88. His career firmly established pre‑Quaternary palynology in Norway and influenced generations of palaeobotanists and stratigraphers worldwide.

== Honours and awards ==
Manum was elected to the Norwegian Academy of Science and Letters in 1980 and received the American Association of Stratigraphic Palynologists' Medal for Scientific Excellence in 2002. Several dinoflagellate cyst taxa were named in his honour, including the genus Manumiella, Chatangiella manumii, and Impagidinium manumii.
