= Tore Helge Larsen =

Norwegian harness racer

Tore Helge Larsen (22 December 1945 – 1 January 2015) was a Norwegian harness racer.

He won 2072 races during his career, which lasted from the 1960s to 2001. He grew up in Ekeberg, Oslo. He died from cancer on New Year's Day in 2015.
