= Johan B. Steen =

Norwegian biologist (1934–2015)

Johan B. Steen (14 January 1934 − 9 April 2015) was a Norwegian biologist.

He grew up in Nordberg, Oslo. He took his degree at the University of Oslo, and after being appointed as a professor of physiology at the University of Tromsø in 1972, he later returned to the University of Oslo as professor. Among many specialities, his most visible contributions came within Lagopus research. He was a fellow of the Norwegian Academy of Science and Letters.

He resided at Ullern and died in April 2015.
