= Arvid Eikevik =

Norwegian painter

- Born: 13 April 1935; Svelgen, Norway
- Died: 1 December 2015 (aged 80); Oslo, Norway
- Occupation: Painter

Arvid Eikevik (13 April 1935 – 1 December 2015) was a Norwegian painter.

== Biography ==
He was born at Svelgen in Sogn og Fjordane, Norway. He was the son of Nils Mattias Eikevik and Anna Aannevik.

He studied at the Norwegian National Academy of Fine Arts in Oslo. He was trained at Statens Kunstakademi from 1959 to 1960 and at Statens Håndverks- og Kunstindustriskole and under Aage Storstein and Reidar Aulie from 1960 to 1963. He was trained at the Royal Danish Academy of Fine Arts in Copenhagen under Niels Lergaard from 1963 to 1964.

He was awarded the Hans Ødegaards legat in 1963, Thomas Fearnleys stipend in 1963, Ib Schlytters legat 1967 and Hans og Helga Reuschs legat in 1968. He conducted study trips to Italy and Greece during 1964. He debuted in 1966 at Kunstnerforbundet in Oslo.

He died at Lovisenberg Hospital in Oslo during 2015. He is represented at the National Gallery of Norway, at Riksgalleriet, and at the Norwegian Museum of Contemporary Art.
