= Kaare Norman Selvig =

Norwegian business leader

- Born: 17 July 1918; Glasgow, Scotland
- Died: 20 December 2015 (aged 97)
- Occupation: Business leader

Kaare Norman Selvig (17 July 1918 – 20 December 2015) was a Norwegian business leader.

He was born in Glasgow as a son of a seamen's priest. He finished his secondary education in 1937, graduated from the University of Oslo with the cand.jur. degree in 1946. He was the managing director of the Norwegian Employers' Confederation between 1969 and 1979. He resided in Sandvika. He was decorated as a Knight, First Class of the Order of St. Olav, Commander of the Order of the Dannebrog, the Order of the White Rose of Finland and the Order of the Polar Star.
