= Else M. Barth =

Norwegian philosopher (1928–2015)

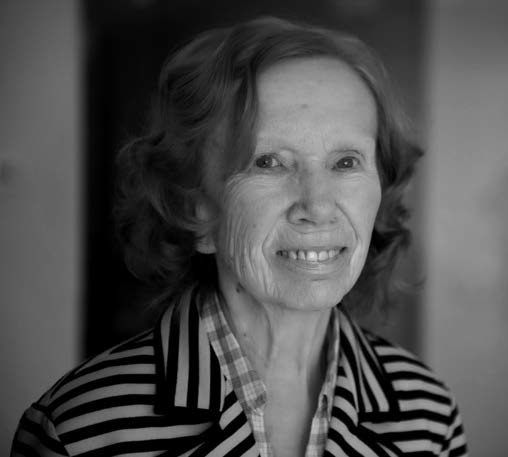

Else Margarete Barth (3 August 1928, Strinda Municipality – 6 January 2015, Groningen) was a Norwegian philosopher.

She was a professor of analytic philosophy at the University of Groningen. She died here in January 2015. She was a fellow of the Norwegian Academy of Science and Letters.

== Life ==
She was professor in analytic philosophy at the University of Groningen, from 1977 till 1993. She made important contributions to empirical logic, study of argumentation and feminist philosophy.

In Norway she was best known for her study of Vidkun Quisling's idiosyncratic ideology, "Universism". The book on this topic was expanded and issued in English as A Nazi Interior: Quisling's Hidden Philosophy.

== Selected publications ==
- The Logic of the Articles in Traditional Philosophy (1974)
- From Axiom to Dialogue (with Erik Krabbe, 1982)
- Problems, Functions and Semantic Roles (with Rob Wiche, 1986)
- Logic and Political Culture (ed. with E.C.W. Krabbe, 1992)
- Women Philosophers: A Bibliography of Books (1992)
- A Nazi Interior: Quisling's Hidden Philosophy (2003)
- Feministische mannen. Nederland in de schaduw van Scandinavië (Feminist Men. The Netherlands in the Shadow of Scandinavia, with Henk Misset, 2010)
