= Fredrik Kiil =

Norwegian physician

- Born: 29 September 1921; Narvik, Norway
- Died: 25 December 2015 (aged 94)
- Occupation: Physician
- Known for: Improvements of the artificial kidney

Fredrik Kiil (né Kristoffersen; 29 September 1921 – 25 December 2015) was a Norwegian physician, known for his improvements on haemodialysis machines (also referred to as the artificial kidney).

== Biography ==
Kiil was born in Narvik to Arne Kristoffersen and Marthea Kiil, and was married to physician Ragnhild Valberg. He completed his medical degree in Oslo in 1948 and received his medical doctorate in 1958 with his thesis titled The function of the Ureter and Renal Pelvis. After completing his specialist certification in internal medicine in 1961, he completed further studies at the University of Texas until 1962. He was then appointed professor of medicine and head of the a research institute at Ullevål University Hospital in Oslo.

One of Kiil's seniors at Ullevål University Hospital, Carl Semb, obtained a haemodialysis machine (artificial kidney) for the hospital's patients with kidney failure and tasked Kiil with getting it operational. Kiil found the machine to have numerous flaws and so he developed a completely new model, together with engineer Bjørn Amundsen, trying different materials. Their efforts were successful in creating what became known as "the Kiil kidney", which became an international standard.

He was awarded the Fridtjof Nansen Prize in 1974, the Jahre Prize in 1980, and the Dialysis Pioneering Award from the National Kidney Foundation in 1982. He was decorated Knight, First Class of the Order of St. Olav in 1990 and was a fellow of the Norwegian Academy of Science and Letters.

He died in December 2015.
