= Ragne Tangen =

Norwegian television presenter

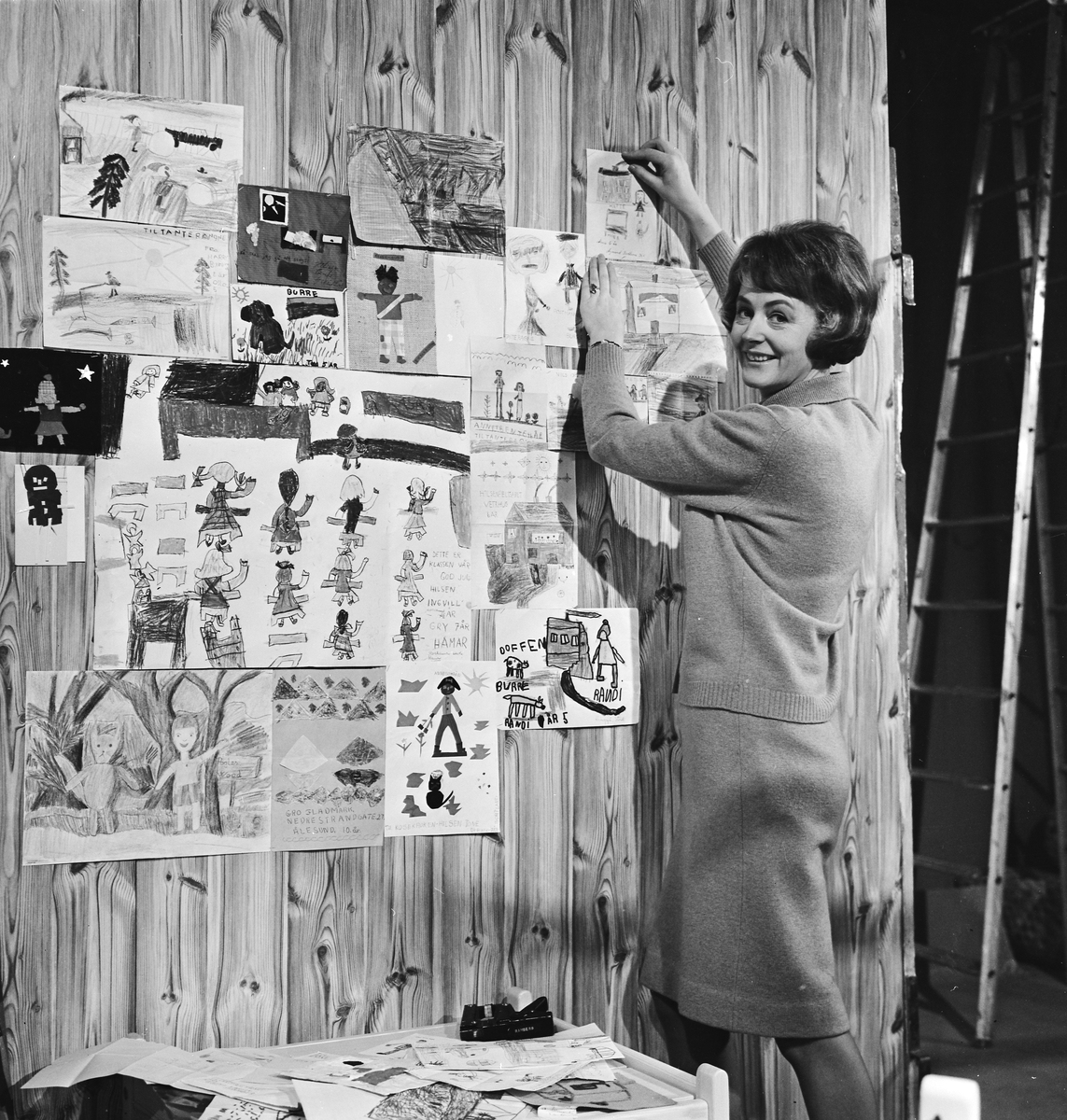
«Aunt Ragne» in the program Du og jeg og vi to, 1967.

Ragne Tangen (12 March 1927 – 9 May 2015) was a Norwegian children's television presenter.

She was hired in Norwegian Broadcasting Corporation (NRK) radio in 1958, featuring in Barnetimen for de minste. She then made the first children's television program in Norway, I kosekroken, when NRK commenced its television broadcasts in 1960. With the screen name "Aunt Ragne", she became best known for her characters Pernille and Mister Nelson, and also issued children's music records. She resided at Hvalstrand in Asker. She died on 9 May 2015 at the age of 88.
