= Anna Schønheyder =

Norwegian painter and woodcutter (1877–1927)

- Born: 28 August 1877; Oslo, Norway
- Died: 11 April 1927 (aged 49); Oslo, Norway
- Occupations: painter and textile artist

Anna Schønheyder (28 August 1877 – 11 April 1927) was a Norwegian painter and textile artist.

== Biography ==
She was born in Christiania (now Oslo), Norway to Diderik Christian Sommerschild Schønheyder and Marie Kathinka Maurer, and was married to engineer Wilhelm Andreas Hartmann.

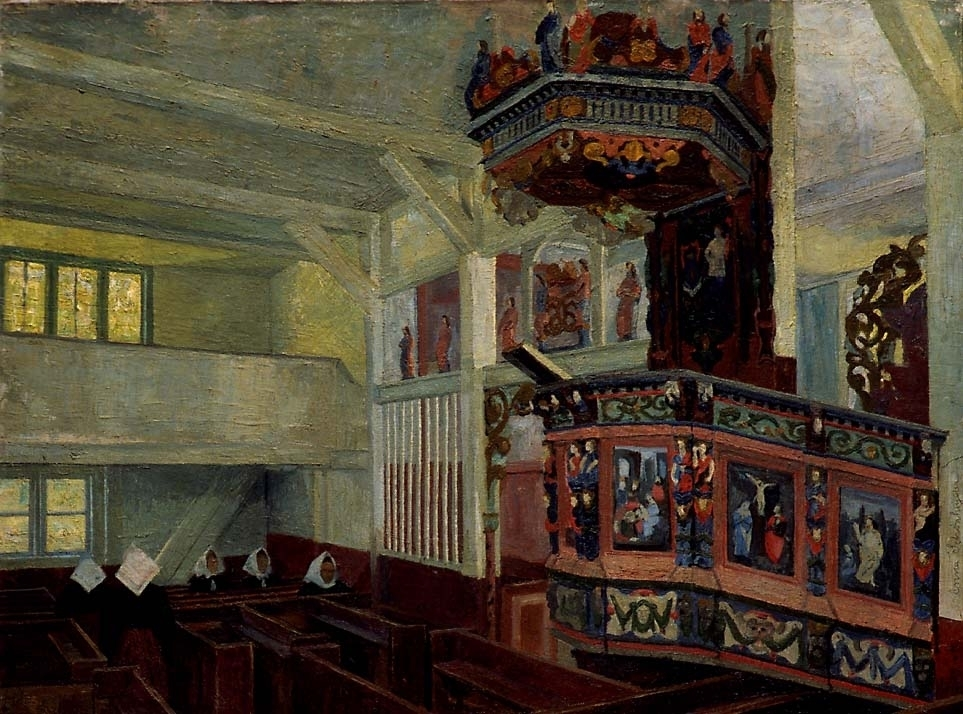
Vågå kirke før gudstjenesten (1906)

She trained at the Norwegian National Academy of Craft and Art Industry under Johan Nordhagen during 1900 and in the period 1905–09. She was a student of Harriet Backer and Oluf Wold-Torne and in 1903–04 with Viggo Johansen and Joakim Skovgaard. Schønheyder made her debut at the Autumn Exhibition at Oslo in 1902.

She is represented in the National Gallery of Norway with the paintings Vågå kirke før gudstjenesten (c.1906) and Pikekammeret på Lye i Vågå (c.1907).
