= Benn John Valsø =

Norwegian bobsledder

Benn Johan Valsø (November 5, 1927 – December 7, 1995) was a Norwegian bobsledder who competed in the late 1940s. He finished tenth in the four-man event at the 1948 Winter Olympics in St. Moritz.
