= Ole Jacob Frich =

Ole Jacob Frich (4 June 1954 – 19 August 2015) was a Norwegian communications director and politician for the Labour Party.

Frich was born in Cooma, Australia. He took his education at Sagene Teachers' College. In politics, he has been a city councillor (kommunalråd) in Oslo. From 1992 to 1996 he served in Brundtland's Third Cabinet as a State Secretary in the Ministry of Health and Social Affairs.

He entered the private sector, and worked at Geelmuyden.Kiese and the Norwegian Financial Services Association. In 2000 he was hired in KLP, where he is executive vice president for communication. He died on 19 August 2015.
