= Ole Sjølie =

Norwegian painter

Ole Kristian Sjølie (2 April 1923 – 11 November 2015) was a Norwegian painter.

He was born in Fauske Municipality. He attended the Norwegian National Academy of Fine Arts from 1946 to 1949, and was one of the pioneers of abstract expressionism in Norway. His works have been bought by the National Gallery of Norway, the Riksgalleriet and the Arts Council Norway. He died in November 2015.
