= Sigfrid Mohn =

Norwegian politician

Sigfrid Mohn (30 December 1930–22 March 2015) was a Norwegian politician for the Conservative Party.

She served as a deputy representative to the Norwegian Parliament from Hordaland during the terms 1977–1981 and 1981–1985.
