= Svein Døvle Larssen =

Norwegian editor (1928–2015)

Svein Døvle Larssen (20 April 1928 – 23 January 2015) was a Norwegian newspaper editor. He spent most of his career in the Conservative press in the county of Vestfold, and was also an elected politician for the Conservative Party. He also held a number of positions in Norwegian media organizations.

== Career ==
He was born in Stokke, and took his examen artium in 1948. In 1949 he was hired as a journalist in the now defunct Sandefjord-based newspaper Dagbladet Vestfold. He was soon promoted to editor-in-chief, although in another newspaper, Rjukan Dagblad. From 1954 to 1956 he was the editor-in-chief of Larvik Morgenavis. At the same time he was elected to serve as a member of Stokke municipal council for the term 1955–1959. In 1956 he was hired as a journalist in a larger newspaper, Tønsbergs Blad.

Larssen took a break from his newspaper career from 1960 to 1967, to pursue a career as director of public relations in Esso Norway. From 1963 to 1964 he served in the municipal council of Åsgårdstrand. In 1967 he was hired in the editorial staff of his old newspaper Tønsbergs Blad. He stayed there the rest of his career, from 1977 to 1995 as editor-in-chief. He also served on the municipal council of Borre Municipality, into which Åsgårdstrand had been incorporated, from 1971 to 1975.

Larssen chaired the local branches of the Conservative Party in both Stokke, Åsgårdstrand and Borre. More importantly, he has been the chairman of the Association of Norwegian Editors and the Conservative Press Association, as well as chair of the Norwegian News Agency. He has also worked to support the archaic written form of Norwegian, Riksmål.

== Personal life ==
Upon his death he resided in Åsgårdstrand. Larssen died at the age of 86 on 23 January 2015. His son Lars Døvle Larssen is now a journalist in Tønsbergs Blad.
