= Petter Fauchald =

Norwegian footballer (1930-2013)

Petter Fauchald (30 March 1930 – 4 January 2013) was a Norwegian footballer. He played for Kapp IF and was capped twice for Norway. With Kapp he played in the 1958–59 Norwegian Main League.
