= Steiner Arvid Kvalø =

Norwegian fisherman and politician

Steiner Arvid Kvalø (29 July 1922 – 18 May 2015) was a Norwegian fisherman and politician for the Labour Party.

He was born in Vikna Municipality in a fisher's family, and was a fisherman himself from 1946 to 1973. He was a member of the municipal council of Vikna Municipality from 1955 to 1971 and 1979 to 1983. He served as a deputy representative to the Parliament of Norway from Nord-Trøndelag during the terms 1969–1973, 1973–1977, 1977–1981. He was a full member from October 1973 following the death of Johan Støa, and throughout that term.

Among several board and committee memberships, especially in the fisheries sector, he was a board member of Norges Råfisklag from 1960 to 1991 and supervisory council member of Fiskernes Bank from 1963. He held honorary membership in the Labour Party.
