= Dagfinn Tveito =

Norwegian magazine editor (1927–2015)

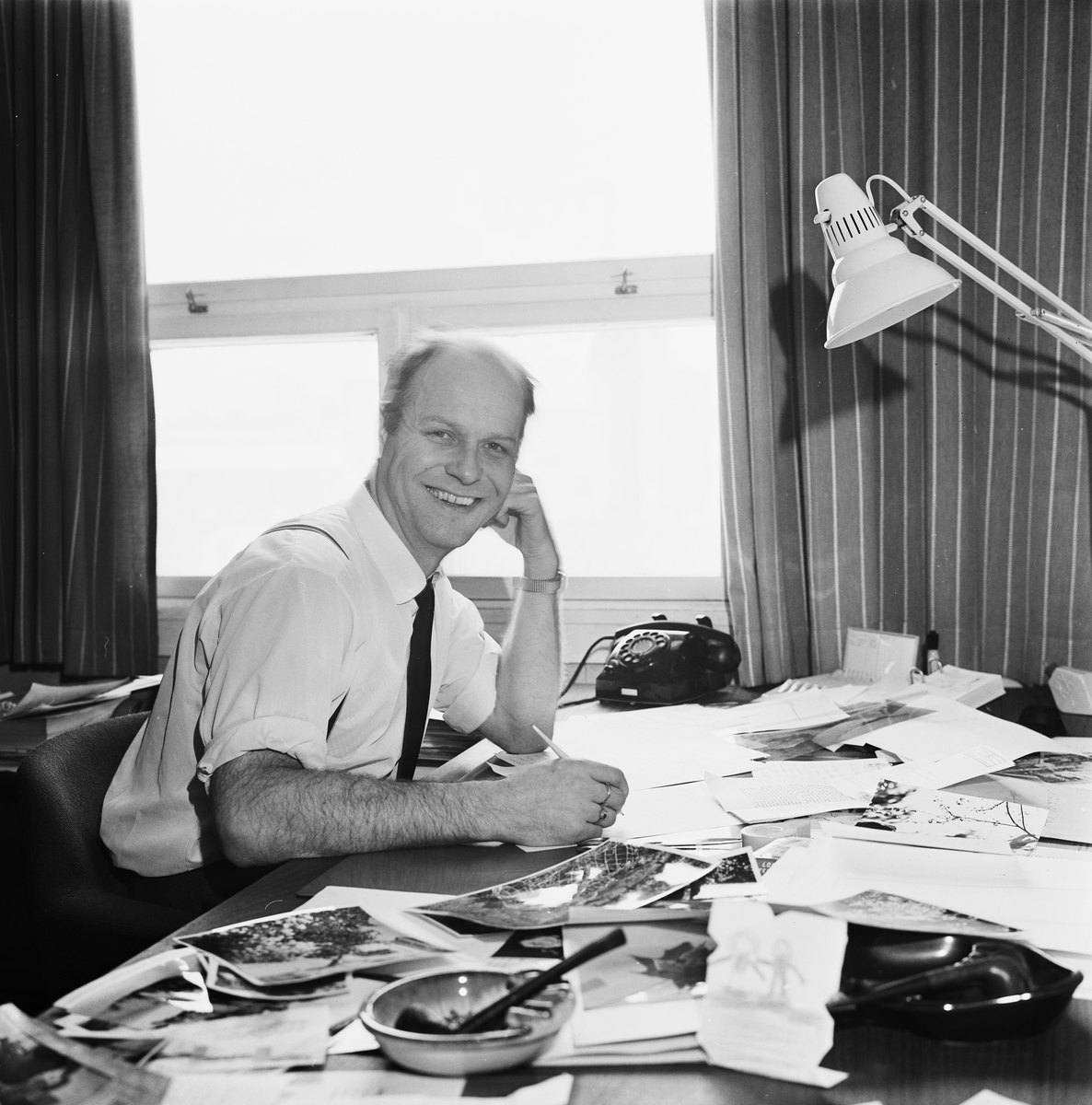
Dagfinn Tveito

Dagfinn Tveito (11 March 1927 – 5 February 2015) was a Norwegian magazine editor.

He was born at Søgne Municipality in Vest-Agder, Norway. He was the son of Sjur Tveito (1893–1978) and Kristine Tallaksen (1902–86). His father was a teacher who taught in agricultural schools at Søgne and at Stend in Hordaland. He was educated in horticulture. He received a scholarship to attend Hjeltnes Horticultural School and later attended Agder folkehøgskole and the Norwegian University of Life Sciences (Norges miljø- og biovitenskapelige universitet) in Ås in Akershus.

Tveito first served as a secretary at the gardening magazine Norsk Hagetidend in 1955. He served as editorial secretary 1957, editor 1960 and director until 1970. He was managing director of the Norwegian Horticulture Society (Det norske hageselskap) from 1970 to 1990. He edited and publish a number of books about gardening, including Trivsel i hagen from 1960, Hageselskapets planteleksikon from 1973, Hageselskapets store bok om grønnsaker, frukt og bær from 1977 and Hageselskapets store urtebok from 1978. He was decorated Knight, First Class of the Order of St. Olav in 1990.
