= Finn Backer =

Norwegian judge

Finn Backer (6 July 1927 – 9 June 2015) was a Norwegian judge.

He was born in Oslo. He worked in the Ministry of Justice and the Police, becoming assistant secretary in 1958. He was a presiding judge in Eidsivating Court of Appeal from 1973, and was then a Supreme Court Justice from 1985 to 1997.
