= Leiv Kjøllmoen =

Norwegian politician

Leiv Kjøllmoen (15 July 1930 – 8 April 2015) was a Norwegian politician for the Labour Party.

He served as a deputy representative to the Parliament of Norway from Rogaland during the terms 1977–1981 and 1981–1985. In total he met during 70 days of parliamentary session. He was a labourer and trade unionist at Karmøy Fabrikker, Norsk Hydro's plant in Karmøy Municipality.
