= Jan W. Dietrichson =

Norwegian philologist (1927–2019)

Jan Waldemar Dietrichson (16 May 1927 – 10 October 2019) was a Norwegian philologist.

== Biography ==
Jan W. Dietrichson was born in Oslo, and his Bachelor of Arts degree at the Cornell University in 1949. He followed with a Master of Arts degree at Harvard University in 1950, the cand.philol. degree at the University of Oslo in 1953. He worked as a secretary in the publishing house Gyldendal Norsk Forlag from 1952 to 1962. Then, after two years as a lecturer, he was a research fellow at the University of Oslo from 1962 to 1964. In 1969 he took the dr.philos. degree on the thesis The Image of Money in the American Novel of the Gilded Age. He was an associate professor from 1971 to 1993 and a professor from 1993 to his retirement in 1997. He has also been involved in the Conservative Party of Norway. Dietrichson died on 10 October 2019, at the age of 92.
