= Anders Lysne =

Norwegian educator

Anders Lysne (born 21 May 1926 – 29 May 2015) was a Norwegian educator.

He was born in Lærdal Municipality. After teachers' college and a tenure as a teacher, he took the mag.art. degree in pedagogy at the University of Oslo in 1961. He followed with the dr.philos. degree in 1970, was a docent from the same year and professor from 1972 to 1996. He also headed the International Summer School at the University of Oslo from 1986 to 1992. Lysne was a member of the university's board ("academic college") and of NAVF.

He resided at Haslum. He died at age 89.
