= 2011 in Norway =

- Centuries: 19th; 20th; 21st
- Decades: 1990s; 2000s; 2010s; 2020s
- See also: List of years in Norway

Events in the year 2011 in Norway.

== Incumbents ==
- Monarch – Harald V.
- President of the Storting – Dag Terje Andersen (Norwegian Labour Party)
- Prime Minister – Jens Stoltenberg (Norwegian Labour Party)

== Events ==
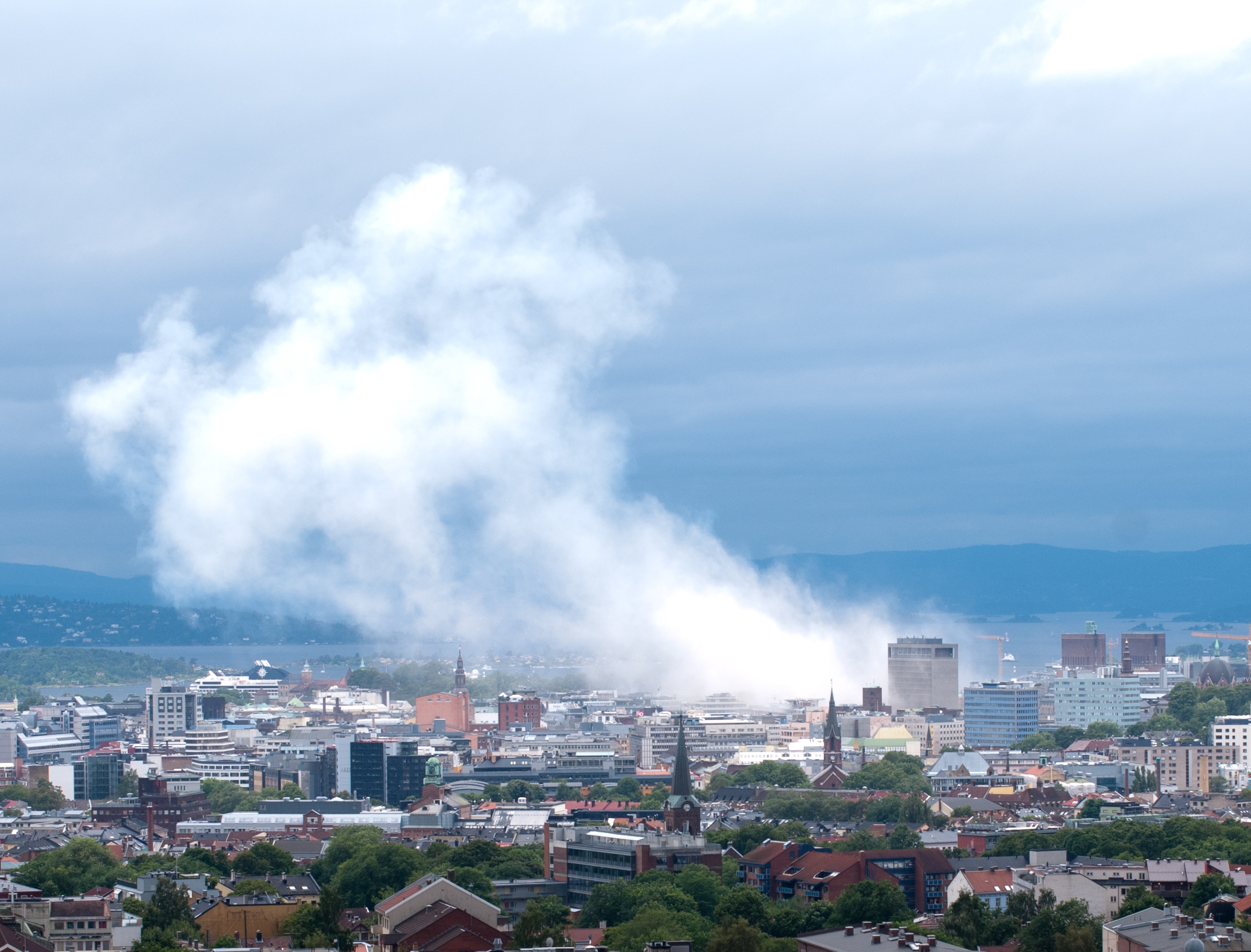
Oslo, the capital city of Norway was affected by July 2011 terror attacks.

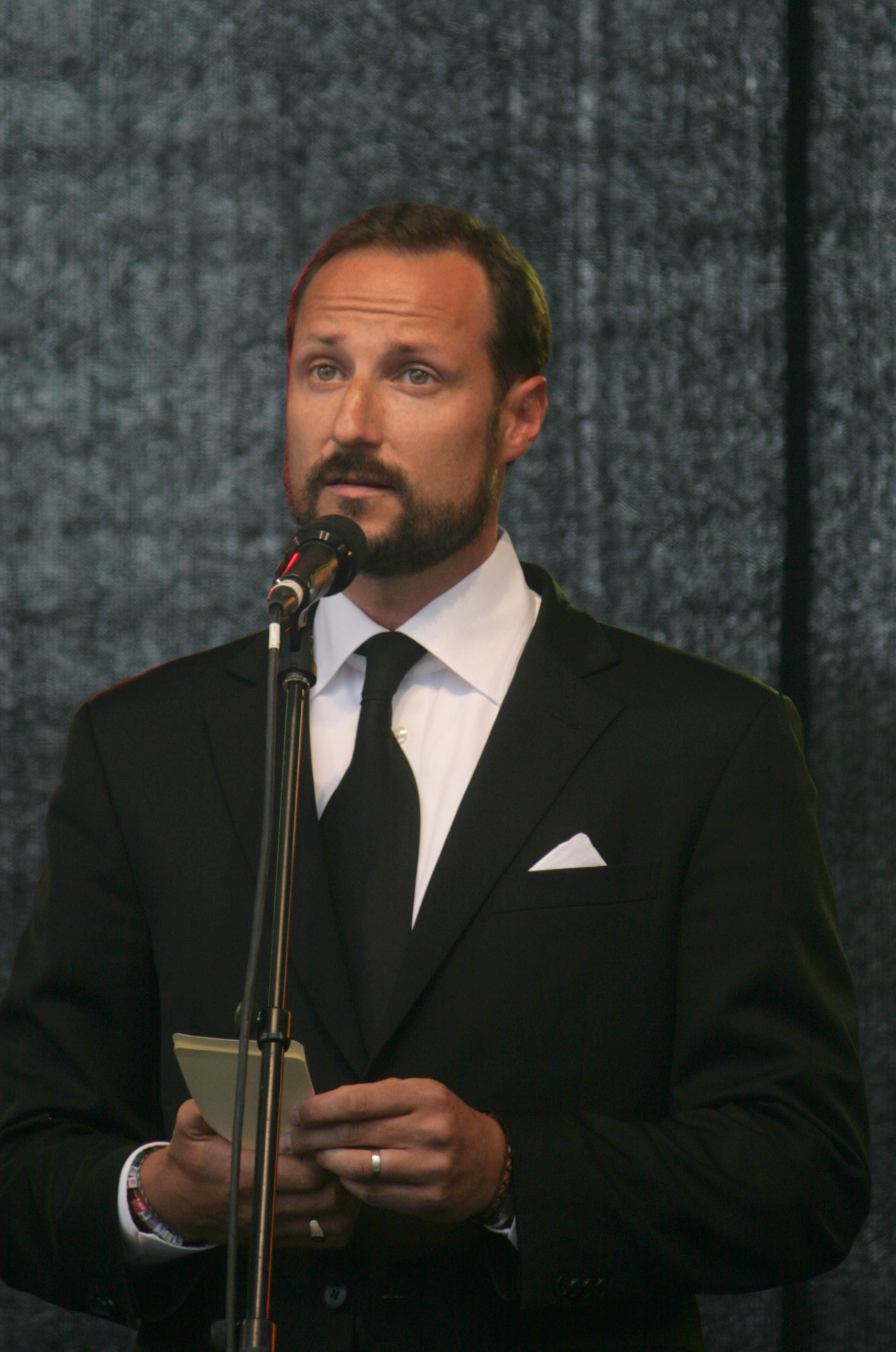
Prince Haakon at the 'Rose march' to pay tribute for the victims of the 2011 Norway attacks.

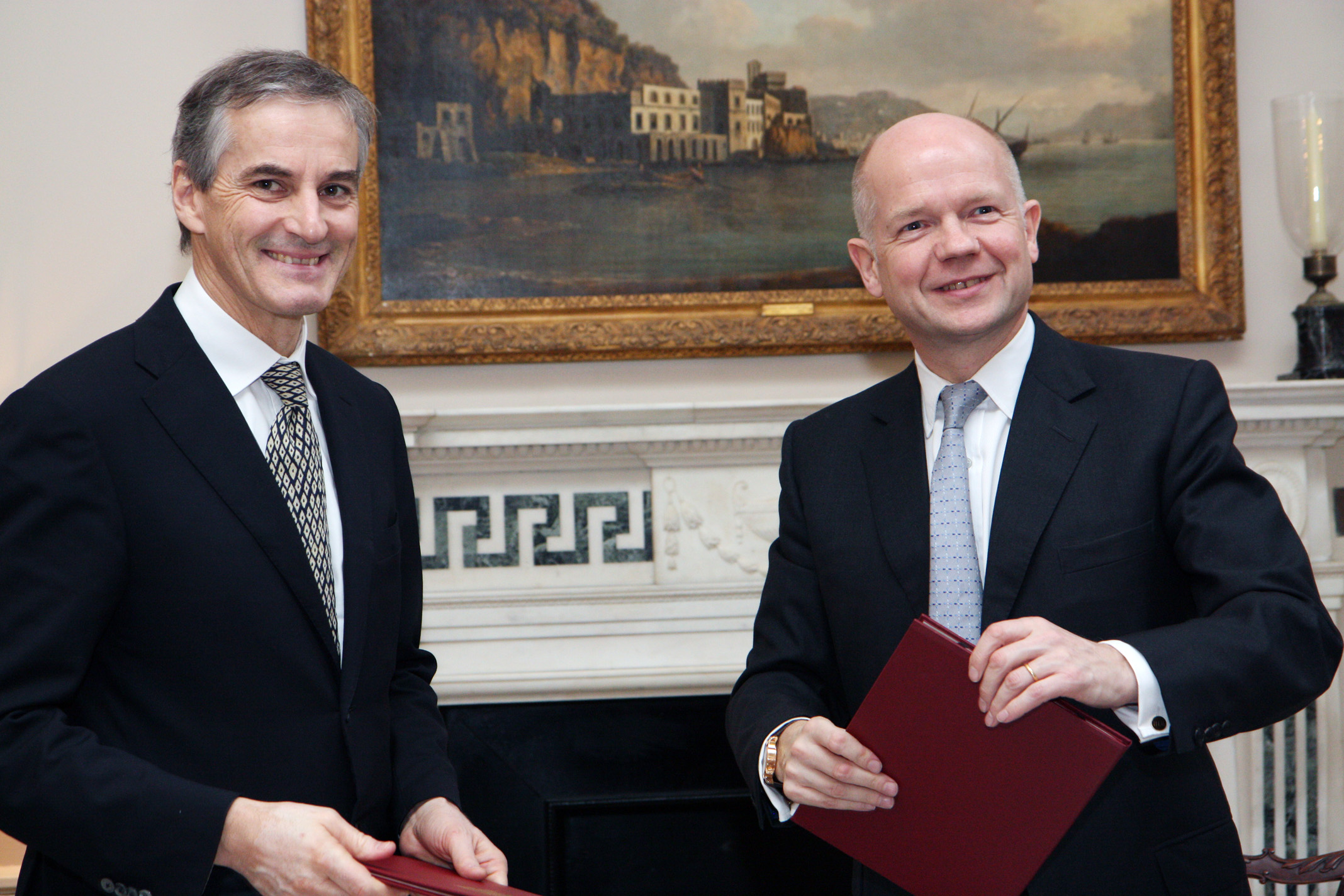
British Foreign Secretary William Hague (right) and Norwegian Foreign Minister Jonas Gahr Støre sign a Memorandum of Understanding on UK-Norway co-operation on polar research and cultural heritage in London, England, on 30 November 2011.

=== January ===
- 7 January – Five people were killed in a traffic accident on the European route E8 in Lavangsdalen near Tromsø.
- 12 January – Russian-born blogger Maria Amelie was arrested for having stayed in Norway illegally since 2002. Amelie was deported from Norway to Russia on 24 January 2011.

=== February ===
- 2 February – A Norwegian MP nominates WikiLeaks for the Nobel Peace Prize, saying "Wikileaks have contributed to the struggle for human rights, democracy and freedom of speech globally, by exposing (among many other things) corruption, war crimes and torture – sometimes even conducted by allies of Norway".
- 15 February – The Government of the Philippines and Communist Party of the Philippines hold their first peace talks in six years in Oslo, Norway.

=== June ===
- June – 2011 Eastern Norway floods.

=== July ===
- 4 July – The Ullensvang helicopter accident: five people were killed in a helicopter crash near Kinsarvik.
- 21 July – Museum for Northern Peoples is opened in Manndalen in Gáivuotna Municipality (Kåfjord).
- 22 July – 2011 Norway attacks: 77 people were killed in a twin terrorist attack in Norway after a bombing in the Regjeringskvartalet, the government center in Oslo and the massacre in the political youth camp in the island of Utøya.
- 29 July – The first funerals of last week's terrorism and shooting victims were held.

=== October ===
- 7 October – The Linesøy Bridge is opened, connecting the islands of Linesøya and Stokkøya in Åfjord Municipality.

=== November ===
- 25 November – The Cyclone Berit hits the Norwegian coast.

== Popular culture ==
=== Music ===
- Norway in the Eurovision Song Contest 2011

=== Sports ===
- 23 February – 6 March – the 2011 FIS Nordic World Ski Championships in Oslo
- 5 May—8 May – biannual convention (Norwegian: Idrettstinget) of the Norwegian Olympic and Paralympic Committee and Confederation of Sports
- 29 June – 6 July – the 2011 FIFA Women's World Cup Group D in Germany
- 2 – 18 December – the 2011 World Women's Handball Championship in Brazil

=== Film ===
- 26 August – Headhunters, directed by Morten Tyldum, released in Norway

=== Literature ===
- The novel Days in the History of Silence by Merethe Lindstrøm is published.

== Anniversaries ==
- 200 years since University of Oslo was established (1811)
- 150 years since Norwegian Confederation of Sports was established (1861)
- 19 March – 50 years since the first female pastor, Ingrid Bjerkås was ordained in Vang Church (1961)
- 10 October – 150 years since the birth of Fritjof Nansen (died 1930)
- 14 December – 100 years since Roald Amundsen's expedition reached the South Pole (1911)

== Notable deaths ==
=== January ===
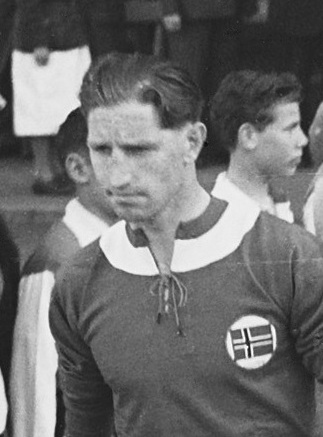
Thorbjørn Svenssen

- 1 January – Peter F. Hjort, physician (born 1924)
- 8 January – Thorbjørn Svenssen, footballer (born 1924)
- 8 January – Jan K. S. Jansen, professor of medicine (born 1931)
- 11 January – Johannes Holt, engineer (born 1917)
- 11 January – Knut Olsen, television presenter (born 1953)
- 12 January – Terje Sagvolden, neuroscientist (born 1945)
- 14 January – Per Olav Wiken, yacht racer (born 1937, died in Spain)
- 23 January – Ole Kopreitan, political activist (born 1937)
- 24 January – Audun Tylden, record mogul (born 1948)
- 27 January – Svein Mathisen, footballer (born 1952)
- 27 January – Hannemor Gram, alpine skier (born 1918)
- 27 January – Kjeld Vibe, diplomat (born 1927)
- 28 January – Kari Werner Øfsti, broadcasting executive (born 1940)

=== February ===
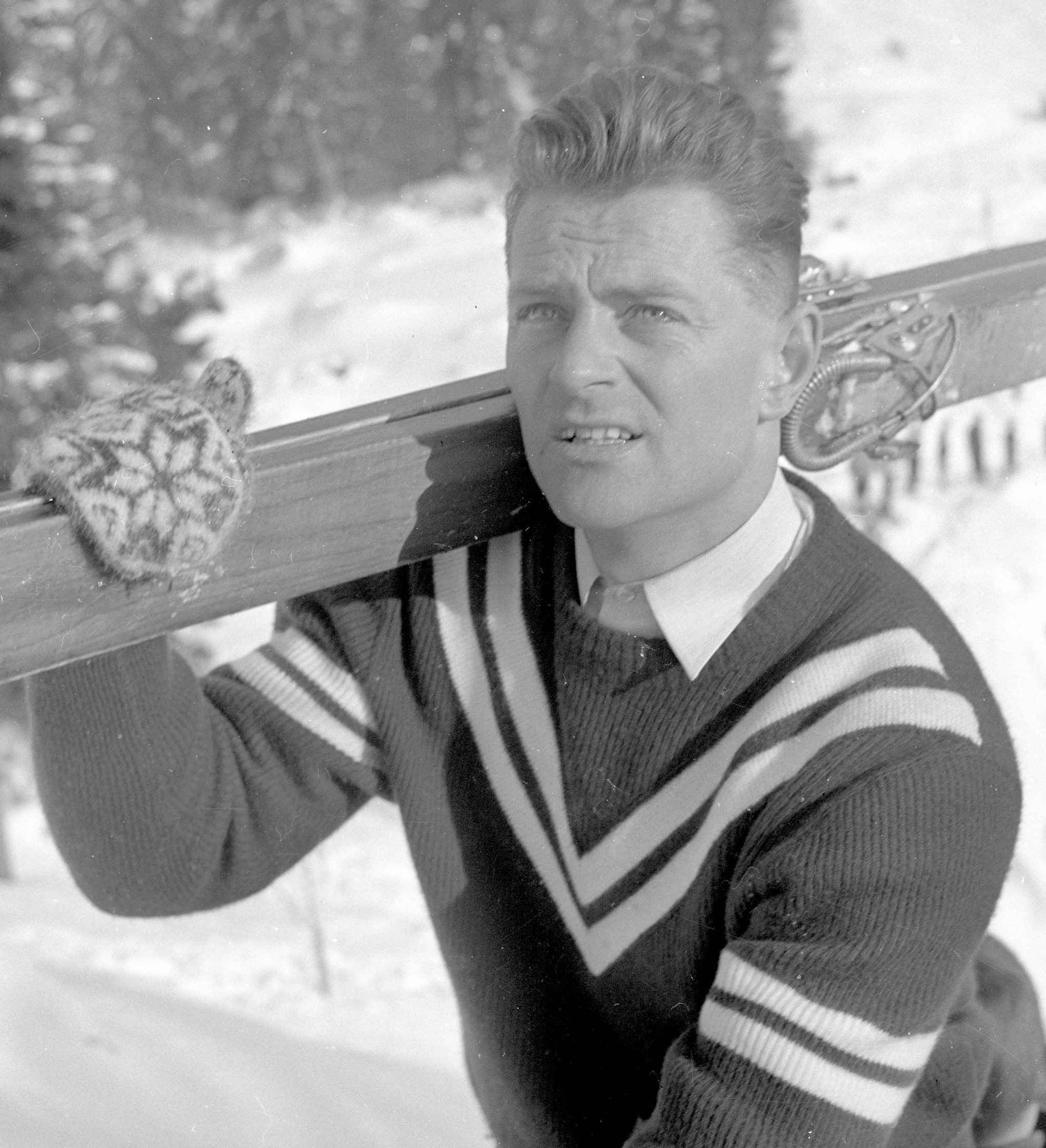
Arnfinn Bergmann

- 1 February – Knut Risan, actor (born 1930)
- 3 February – Eline Nygaard Riisnæs, pianist (born 1913)
- 6 February – Axel Seeberg, archeologist (born 1931)
- 10 February – Randi Thorvaldsen, speed skater (born 1925)
- 10 February – Astrid Carlson, teacher and orienteer (born 1954).
- 13 February – Arnfinn Bergmann, ski jumper (born 1928)
- 13 February – Harald Kolstad, film critic (born 1946) – body found on this date
- 13 February – Rolf Solem, police chief (born 1917)
- 14 February – Kjell Bertheussen, physician (born 1947)
- 22 February – Kjell Bjartveit, physician (born 1927)
- 23 February – Rolf Tofte, journalist (born 1923)
- 24 February – Irma Bruun Hodne, artist (born 1919)
- 26 February – Willy Simonsen, sports official (born 1927)
- 26 February – Harald Grimen, philosopher (born 1955)

=== March ===
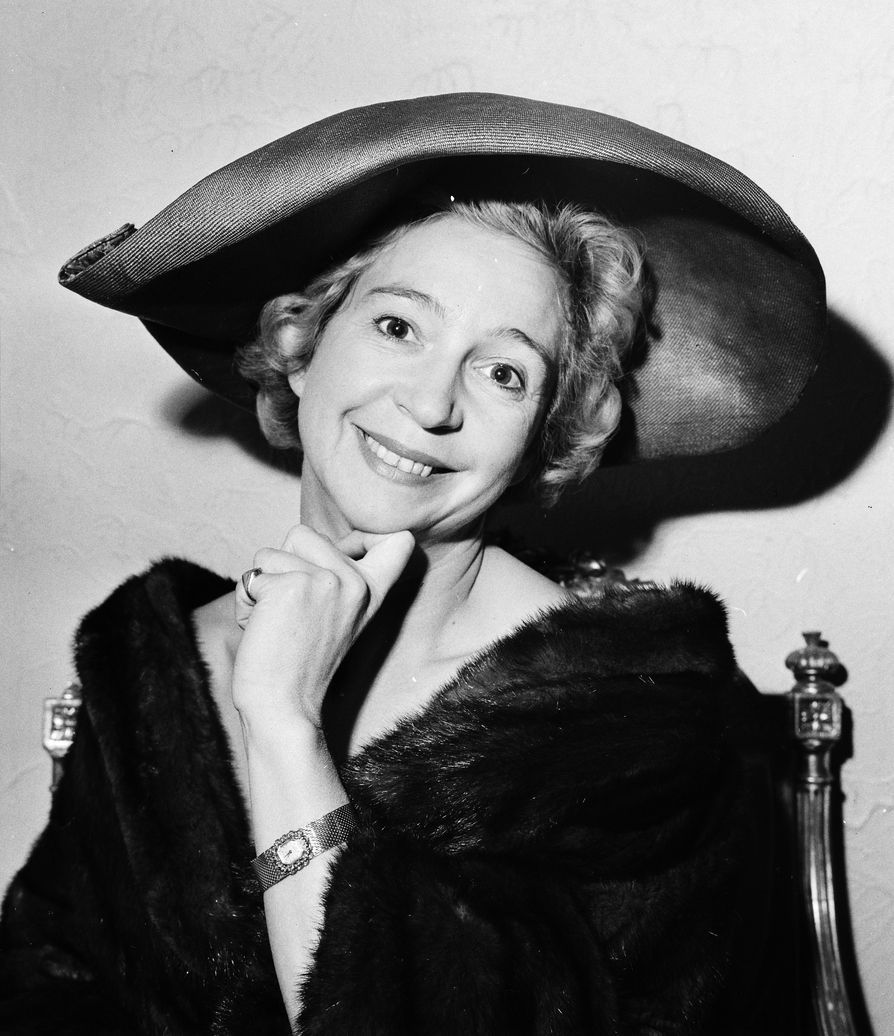
Wenche Foss

- 5 March – Anton Smith-Meyer, diplomat (born 1919)
- 6 March – Oddmund Jensen, cross-country skier (born 1928)
- 7 March – Einar Johannes Lundeby, linguist (born 1914)
- 12 March – Bjarne Røtterud, artist (born 1929)
- 17 March – Martin Kloster-Jensen, linguist (born 1917)
- 26 March – Louis Kloster, architect (born 1932)
- 28 March – Wenche Foss, actress (born 1917)
- 30 March – Oddvar Hansen, footballer (born 1921)

=== April ===
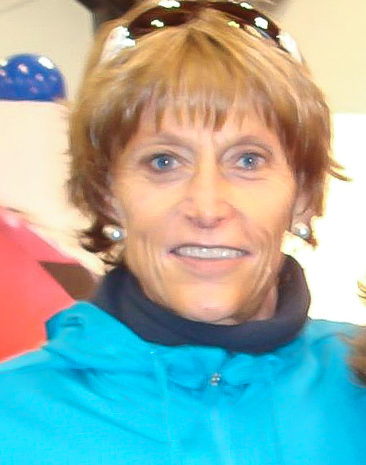
Grete Waitz

- 1 April – Siri Skare, air force officer (born 1958, died in Afghanistan)
- 4 April – Liv Undheim, trade unionist and politician (born 1949)
- 4 April – Ottar Dahl, historian (born 1924)
- 4 April – Paul Grøstad, businessperson (born 1933)
- 10 April – Børt Erik Thoresen, musician (born 1932)
- 11 April – Bjørn Oscar Gulbrandsen, oce hpcley player and yacht racer (born 1925)
- 16 April – Hermod Skånland, banker (born 1925)
- 16 April – Erik Tumyr, journalist (born 1962)
- 18 April – Kjell Håkonsen, harness racer (born 1935)
- 18 April – Trygve Simonsen, politician (born 1937)
- 19 April – Grete Waitz, runner (born 1953)
- 19 April – Aage Møst, sports official (born 1923)
- 20 April – Kari Nyquist, ceramicist (born 1918)
- 21 April – Cato Wadel, social anthropologist (born 1936)
- 22 April – Eyvind Solås, musician (born 1937)
- 24 April – Georg Johan Jacobsen, politician (born 1929)
- 27 April – Dag Stokke, keyboardist (born 1967)
- 28 April – Johan Henrik Andresen, businessperson (born 1930)

=== May ===
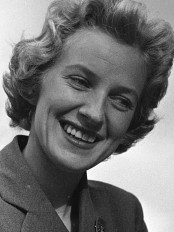
Sølvi Wang

- 2 May – Knut Hedemann, diplomat (born 1922)
- 2 May – Sverre Lyngstad, literary scholar (born 1922)
- 7 May – Einar Coldevin Hellem, printmaker (born 1923)
- 8 May – Finn Wischmann, botanist (born 1918)
- 11 May – Erik Stallemo, businessperson and football agent (born 1935)
- 12 May – Målfrid Kuvås, sports official (born 1942)
- 12 May – Harry Danielsen, politician (born 1936)
- 13 May – Merete Lie Hoel, journalist (born 1926)
- 15 May – Turid Holter, textile artist (born 1936)
- 18 May – Annalise Convad, painter (born 1917)
- 22 May – Rolf Aalerud, politician (born 1921)
- 25 May – Reidar Rudjord, printmaker (born 1930)
- 27 May – Jostein Løfsgaard, university director (born 1923)
- 27 May – Peter Hallaråker, onomastician (born 1933)
- 27 May – Arne Solheim, painter (born 1926)
- 28 May – Sigurd Müller, police chief (born 1924)
- 31 May – Sølvi Wang, singer (born 1929)

=== June ===
- 4 June – Kjellaug Steinslett, writer (born 1946)
- 17 June – Kjell Bohlin, politician (born 1928)
- 18 June – Trygve Stangeland, businessperson (born 1934)
- 18 June – Herman Hagen, director (born 1918)
- 19 June – Oskar Hordnes, chief of police (born 1924)
- 25 June – Tron Gerhardsen, journalist (born 1936)
- 25 June – Henry Olaf Hoff, politician (born 1921)
- 28 June – Olav Askvik, judge and politician (born 1915)

=== July ===
- 2 July – Jostein Erstad, jurist (born 1922)
- 2 July – Per Aasen, journalist and ambassador (born 1927)
- 2 July – Johan Henrik Dahl, ambassador (born 1928)
- 2 July – Paul W. Weeden, jazz guitarist (born 1923)
- 2 July – Magnar G. Huseby, politician (born 1928)
- 3 July – Birger Blom-Kalstø, politician (born 1940)
- 5 July – Odd Mæhlum, javelin thrower (born 1921).
- 7 July – Olav Versto, editor (born 1950)
- 10 July – Terje Grøstad, artist (born 1925)
- 13 July – Per Erik Burud, retailer (born 1962) – body found on 22 July
- 14 July – Sissel Solbjørg Bjugn, writer (born 1947)
- 14 July – Peter Sjøholt, physicist (b. 1925)
- 15 July – Arne Sigurd Haugen, editor and musician (born 1943)
- 18 July – Ludvik Zajc, ski jump coach (born 1943)
- 20 July – Gunnar Vatten, engineer (born 1927)
- 21 July – Lars Skjølaas, politician (born 1933)
- 22 July – Einar Tandberg-Hanssen, astrophysicist (born 1921, died in the US)
- 24 July – Imre Hercz, physician (born 1929)
- 24 July – Harald Johnsen, jazz bassist (born 1973)
- 26 July – Hans Prydz, biochemist (born 1933)
- 28 July – Einar Nistad, retailer (born 1932)
- 29 July – Arild Braastad, diplomat (born 1946)
- 31 July – Fredrik Jensen, Waffen-SS officer (born 1921, died in Sweden)

=== August ===
- 11 August – Tomas Hägg, philologist (born 1938)
- 19 August – Odd Jarl Pedersen, judge (born 1944)
- 21 August – Arne Vinje, chess player (born 1943)

=== September ===
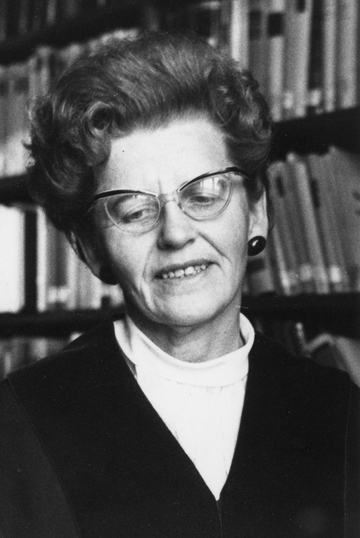
Lilly Bølviken

- 3 September – Finn Helgesen, speed skater (born 1919)
- 4 September – Hilde Heltberg, singer (born 1959)
- 5 September – Reidar Børjeson, figure skater (born 1931)
- 11 September – Lilly Bølviken, Supreme Court Justice (born 1914)
- 19 September – Reidar Hauge, organist (born 1947)
- 22 September – Asbjørn Osnes, ski jumper (born 1932)
- 22 September – Knut Steen, sculptor (born 1924)
- 25 September – Erling Lars Dale, educationalist (born 1946)
- 25 September – Oddmund Bye, fishers' leader (born 1935)
- 25 September – Gjermund Barstad, architect and designer (born 1919)
- 29 September – Andreas Hagen, newspaper editor (born 1924)
- 30 September – Kjell Torheim, fashion designer (born 1948)

=== October ===
- 1 October – Hans Christian Alsvik, television presenter (born 1936)
- 2 October – Kristian Kvakland, sculptor (born 1927.
- 7 October – Magne Solheim, resistance member (born 1918)
- 9 October – Vibeke Falk, actress (born 1918)
- 10 October – Arne Lindaas, artist (born 1924)
- 12 October – Leiv Mjeldheim, historian (born 1929)
- 15 October – Benny Dahl-Hansen, pianist and rector (born 1923)
- 16 October – Arne Eidsmo, politician (born 1941)
- 19 October – Leif Tomren, businessperson (born 1928)
- 22 October – Tove Strømme, pianist and rector (born 1940)
- 28 October – Sivert Farstad, Lord Chamberlain (born 1931)
- 29 October – Kjell Eide, civil servant (born 1925)
- 30 October – Vigleik Eide, Chief of Defence (born 1933)
- 30 October – Evy-Ann Midttun, politician (born 1943)
- 31 October – Nils Johan Lavik, psychiatrist (born 1931)
- 31 October – Helene Andrea Nilsen, supercentenarian (born 1901)

=== November ===
- 1 November – Olav Myklebust, diplomat and politician (born 1932)
- 1 November – Johan Christian Evandt, athlete (born 1934)
- 11 November – Fridtjof Frank Gundersen, legal scholar and politician (born 1934)
- 13 November – Anders Aune, politician (born 1923)
- 14 November – Brikt Jensen, publisher and writer (born 1928)
- 18 November – Erik Gjems-Onstad, resistance member, barrister and politician (born 1922)
- 19 November – Kåre Elgmork, zoologist (born 1924)
- 19 November – Bjarne Lingås, boxer (born 1933)
- 22 November – Oscar Bodøgaard, painter (born 1923)
- 23 November – Henry Øberg, football referee (born 1931)
- 24 November – Gunnar Stensland, footballer (born 1922)
- 25 November – Erling Lægreid, journalist (born 1939)
- 30 November – Ola Byrknes, politician (born 1933)

=== December ===
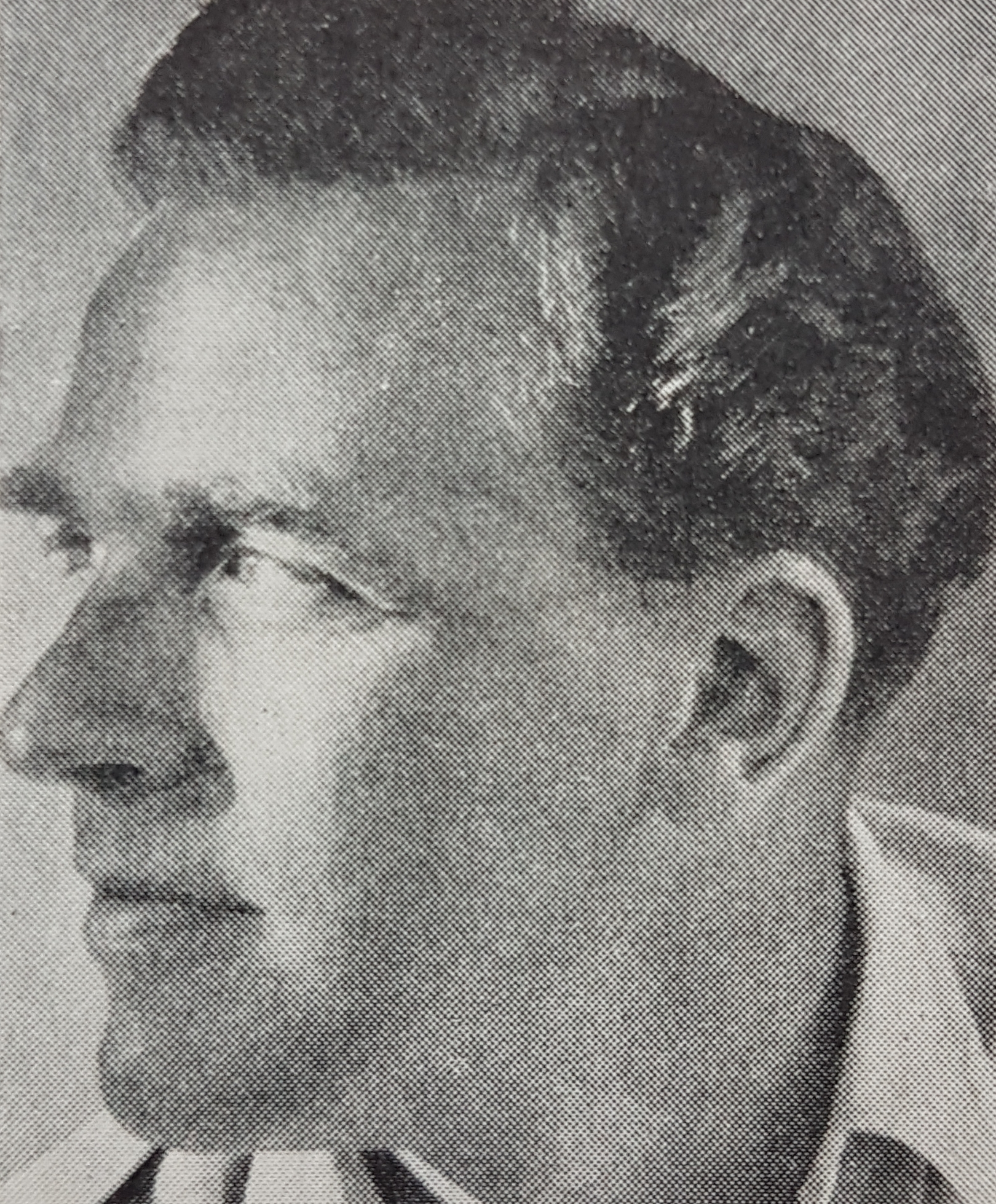
Ulf Aas

- 1 December – Siss Hartmann, singer (born 1934)
- 2 December – Karl E. Nilsen, sculptor (born 1945)
- 4 December – Arne Sund, military psychiatrist (born 1925)
- 9 December – Alf R. Bjercke, businessperson (born 1921)
- 9 December – Kjell Elgjo, professor of medicine (born 1945)
- 15 December – Birger Stuevold Lassen, legal scholar (born 1927)
- 16 December – Ulf Aas, illustrator (born 1919)
- 25 December – Truls Fyhn, police chief (born 1945)
- 29 December – Sveinung Ones, journalist (born 1938)
- 29 December – Arne Rudvin, bishop in the Church of Pakistan (born 1929)
- 29 December – Svein Krøvel, cinematographer (born 1946)

Full date missing

- Jon Viktor Aslaksen, politician (born 1935)
- Gerd Stub Andersen, resistance member (born 1918)
- Odd Kappfjell, politician (born 1942)
- Kjell Knarvik, ski jumper (born 1927)
- Inge Mannsåker, writer (born 1922)
- Karl Over-Rein, writer (born 1946)
- Rolf Eilhardt Pedersen, naval officer (born 1934)

== See also ==
- 2011 in Norwegian music
