= Per Sonerud =

Norwegian politician

Per Sonerud (15 August 1915 – 28 March 1993) was a Norwegian banker, sports official and politician for the Conservative Party.

He was born in Skjeberg. He took middle school in 1934, and spent his career in Sarpsborg Elektriske Bureau from 1933 to 1935 and Sarpsborg Sparebank from 1935 to 1982. He chaired his bankers' trade union from 1955 to 1963.

Sonerud was a member of Sarpsborg school board from 1959 to 1975 and of the city council from 1959 to 1963 and 1967 to 1975. He was elected to the Parliament of Norway from Østfold in 1965, but was not re-elected in 1969.

He chaired the sports club Sarpsborg IL from 1938 to 1964. He was elected as deputy chairman of the Norwegian Athletics Association at their congress in November 1962. He served as deputy in 1963 and 1964, then as chairman from 1965 through 1968. He was a member of the Norwegian Olympic Committee from 1963 to 1969 and the Norwegian Confederation of Sports from 1969 to 1971. He was also a board member of the newspaper Sarpen from 1963 to 1965.

Sporting positions
Preceded by Aage Møst	President of the Norwegian Athletics Association; 1965–1968	Succeeded by Alf R. Bjercke
