= Nistad =

Nistad is a surname. Notable people with the surname include:

- Aline Nistad (1954–2017), Norwegian trombonist and music educator
- Astrid Marie Nistad (born 1938), Norwegian politician
- Clara Nistad (born 1996), Swedish badminton player
- Einar Nistad (1932–2011), Norwegian retailer
- Thore A. Nistad (born 1949), Norwegian politician
- Wenche Nistad (born 1952), Norwegian businessperson and civil servant
