= Alsvik =

Alsvik is a Norwegian surname. Notable people with the surname include:

- Hans Christian Alsvik (1936–2011), Norwegian television presenter
- Peder Alsvik (1882–1964), Norwegian politician
