= Arne B. Mollén =

Norwegian sports official (1913–2000)

Arne B. Mollén (2 May 1913 – 4 July 2000) was a Norwegian sports official.

Representing the club IF Vestheim, Mollén was the president of the Norwegian Athletics Association from 1953 to 1955, vice chairman of the Norwegian Olympic Committee from 1965 to 1969 and chairman from 1969 to 1985. The Olympic Order was bestowed upon him in 1989.

Sporting positions
Preceded by Bjørn Benterud	President of the Norwegian Athletics Association; 1953–1955	Succeeded by Aage Møst
Preceded by Jørgen Jahre	Chairman of the Norwegian Olympic Committee; 1969–1985	Succeeded by Jan Gulbrandsen
