= Henry Hoff =

Henry Hoff may refer to:

- Henry K. Hoff (1809–1878), United States Navy officer
- Henry Olaf Hoff (1925–2011), Norwegian politician
