= Olav Tendeland =

Norwegian barrister and sports administrator

- Born: 29 June 1904; Drøbak, Norway
- Died: 25 December 1996 (aged 92)
- Occupation(s): Lawyer and sports administrator
- Organization: IL Bjart
- Awards: Order of Vasa; Order of the White Rose of Finland

Olav Tendeland (29 June 1904 – 25 December 1996) was a Norwegian barrister and sports administrator.

== Career ==
Tendeland was born in Drøbak to headmaster Thormod Tendeland and Kari Haadem. He passed examen artium in 1922 and graduated as cand.jur. in 1927. He started his own practice as barrister from 1938, and had access to work with Supreme Court cases from 1953, retiring in 1980.

He had a long-term career as sports administrator. He was a board member of the Norwegian Athletics Association from 1932 to 1939 and 1945 to 1946, chaired the Norwegian Athletics Association from 1946 to 1948, was a board member of the International Amateur Athletic Federation from 1950 to 1956, and board member of the Association for the Promotion of Skiing from 1951 to 1958. He was also an international ski jumping referee.

== Honors ==
Tendeland was decorated Knight, First Class of the Swedish Order of Vasa, and Knight, First Class of the Order of the White Rose of Finland.

Sporting positions
Preceded by Mogens Oppegaard	President of the Norwegian Athletics Association; 1946–1948	Succeeded by Bjørn Benterud
