= Bjørn Benterud =

Bjørn Cloumann Benterud (22 January 1901 – 21 March 1985) was a Norwegian businessperson and sports official.

Representing the sports club Bestum IF, he was a board member of the Norwegian Athletics Association from 1933 through 1936, then chairman from 1949 through 1952. He was a member of the law committee in 1938, 1940, 1946–1948 and 1953–1966, chairing it from 1946 to 1947 and 1955 to 1966. He was a member of the judging committee from 1953 to 1956, chaired the appeals committee from 1967 to 1973 and the stadium committee from 1972 to 1973.

He was educated at the Norwegian Institute of Technology, and ran the business Norsk Jungnerakkumulatorfabrikk.

Bjørn was a direct descendant of Peder Jørgen Cloumann, who was present when the Norwegian Constitution was signed at Eidsvoll in 1814.

Bjørn Benterud was married to Mildrid Randi Benterud (f. Grytnæs), and had two children: Birgit Benterud (21 March 1937 - 14 September 2012) and Trond Benterud (1938-). He had three grandchildren: Bjørn Petter Benterud, Lars Bendik Andersen and Torkil Benterud.

Sporting positions
Preceded by Olav Tendeland	President of the Norwegian Athletics Association; 1949–1952	Succeeded by Arne B. Mollén
