= Lægreid =

Lægreid is a surname. Notable people with the surname include:

- Erling Lægreid (1939–2011), Norwegian journalist and non-fiction writer
- Haldor Lægreid (born 1970), Norwegian musician
- Sturla Holm Lægreid (born 1997), Norwegian biathlete
