= Alf R. Bjercke =

Norwegian businessman and sports official (1921–2011)

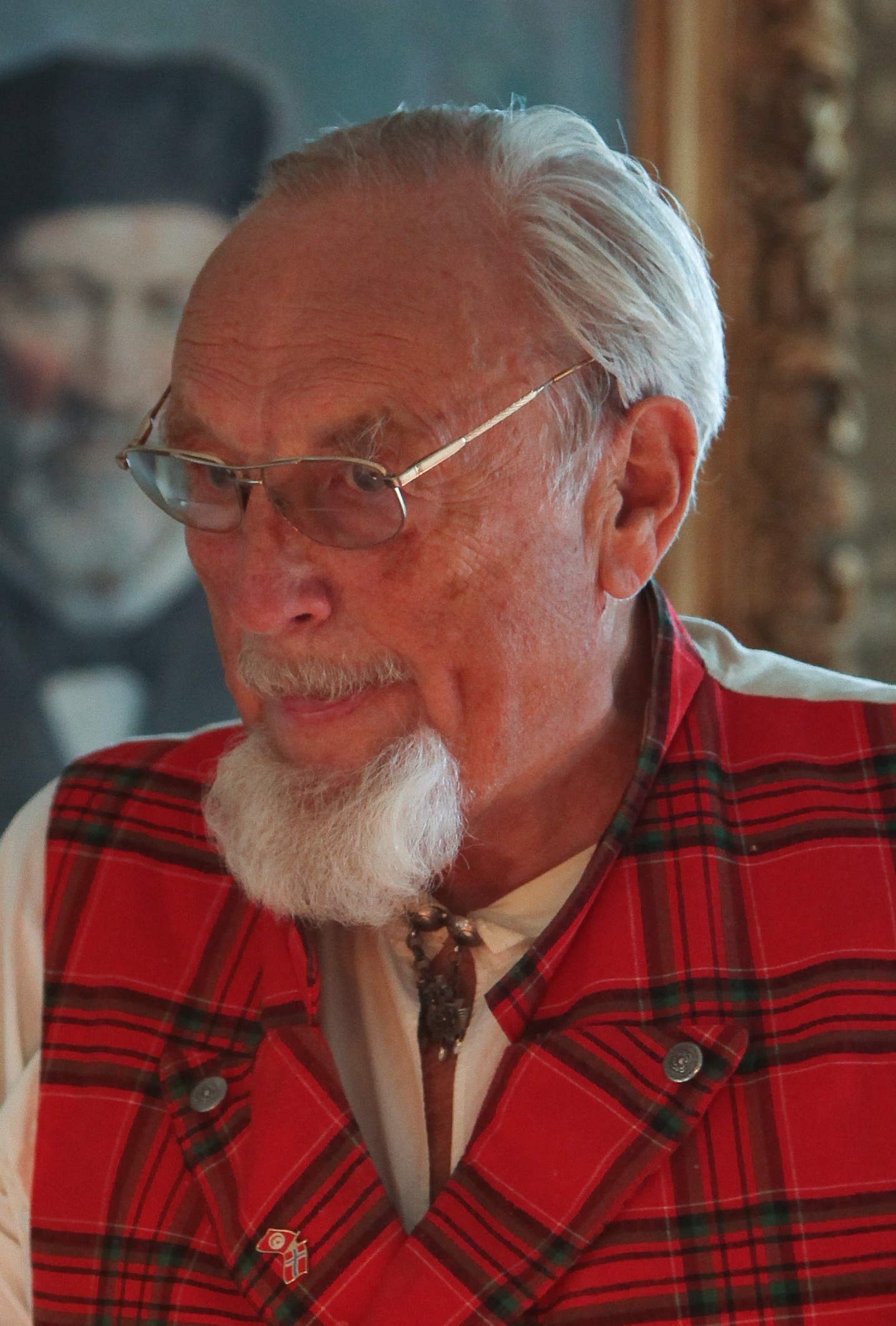
Bjercke in 2009

Alf Richard Bjercke (30 May 1921 – 9 December 2011) was a Norwegian business magnate, consul and sports official.

== Early life ==
He was born in Oslo as a grandson of Alf Bjercke. Alf Bjercke (1851–1933) was a notable businessman, especially within paint and lacquer, and politician. Both are descendants of politician Lars Thorstensen Tønsager.

Alf R. Bjercke attended primary school at Majorstuen, in a class together with Øistein Parmann, Birger Mathisen and Rolf Kirkvaag. He later took what he himself has described as a "lousy" examen artium. He studied chemical technology at the Massachusetts Institute of Technology from 1939 to 1941. He pledged the fraternity of Phi Gamma Delta. However, his studies were interrupted because of World War II. He served with the Royal Norwegian Air Force-in-exile, in Canada and the United Kingdom, from 1941 to 1945. He did not return to MIT after the war, but instead started a career in the family business. He also served in the Air Force from 1948 to 1949, and reached the rank of major as Senior Intelligence Officer in NATO's Northern HQ. He was initiated in 1989 at his chapter's centennial celebration.

== Business career ==
In 1950 he became co-owner of the family company, named Alf Bjercke. He served as CEO from 1966 to 1971. When Alf Bjercke (the company) was incorporated into Jotun in 1972, Bjercke served as chairman of the board until 1983 and then chaired the corporate council until 1988. He has also chaired the employers' association for paint and coating companies. He has also started other companies and brands, including Fjordplast, and the first Norwegian bottled water brand Norwater. From 1963 to 1993 he was the consul-general for Tunisia in Norway.

== Research ==
At the age of 69, Bjercke took up private research on Norwegian dragoons in Schleswig-Holstein from 1758 to 1762. These dragoons were border guards, but never saw military action. His interest in the topic spawned when he discovered that a distant ancestor from the Eidsvoll area had been such a dragoon. In 1999 the University of Kiel published a work by Bjercke, Norwegische Kätnersöhne als königliche Dragoner. He would try to submit this work to the University of Oslo as a thesis, possibly earning the dr.philos. degree. An obstacle was his lack of a formal degree of higher education. The candidacy for the doctorate met opposition in the university, and the case was delayed for several years before the university finally rejected to take it up for doctoral assessment.

Bjercke has also released an autobiography: Back-up av et rikt liv (2001), as well as many other books.

== Organizations ==
Bjercke was among the founders of the Anders Lange Party, later known as the Progress Party. He later resigned his membership because he disagreed on a number of issues. From 1974 to 1976 he was a board member of the Oslo Conservative Party. He also served one term in Oslo city council. Some time around Siv Jensen's takeover as party leader he rejoined the Progress Party.

Bjercke was also a founder of the Norwegian Organization for Asylum Seekers, and has been a board member. He has also held board/council memberships in the Norwegian Agency for Development Cooperation, the World Wildlife Fund, Norway and the Norway-America Association, and has been involved in Rotary International. He has been an initiator for restoration of the world's oldest steamship Skibladner for traffic, and has vice-chaired the board that is responsible for the ship Christian Radich. Representing the sports club IF Ready, he was deputy chairman of the Norwegian Athletics Association in 1968, before being elected to chairman at the 1968 congress, serving from 1969 to 1972. He was a member of the Norwegian Olympic Committee during the leadership period. He led the athletic team at the 1972 Olympics in Munich.

Bjercke has been decorated with the Order of St. Olav, and has also been decorated by the Tunisian state as a Commander, by the Emperor Haile Selassie I with an Off. of the Star of Ethiopia and by Rotary International with the Paul Harris Medal with 5 sapphires.

Sporting positions
Preceded by Per Sonerud	President of the Norwegian Athletics Association; 1969–1972	Succeeded by Egil Gulliksen
