= Grøstad =

Grøstad is a surname. Notable people with the surname include:

- Einar Grøstad (1902–1983), Norwegian jurist and civil servant
- Paul Grøstad (1933–2011), Norwegian businessman
- Terje Grøstad (1925–2011), Norwegian painter and illustrator
