= Jørgen Jahre =

Norwegian shipowner and sports official (1907–1998)

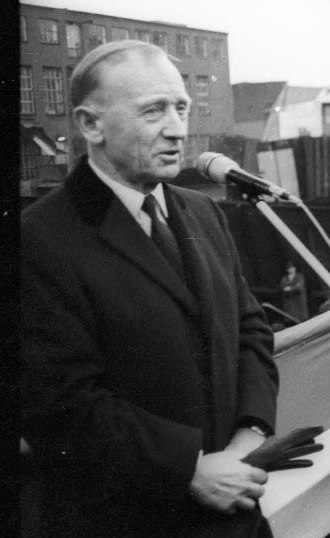
Jørgen Jahre in 1965

Jørgen Jahre (29 October 1907 – 24 April 1998) was a Norwegian shipowner and sports official.

Jørgen Jahre was born in Tjølling Municipality, in Vestfold county, Norway. He was a nephew of Norwegian shipping magnate Anders Jahre. He was secretary of the Norwegian shipping company A/S Kosmos in Sandefjord until in 1939. In 1948 he went from being a manager in Sandar Fabrikker A/S in Sandar Municipality to becoming a partner in Anders Jahre's company. He has been the president of the Norwegian Shipowners' Association.

He was the president of the Football Association of Norway from 1963 to 1965, and chairman of the Norwegian Olympic Committee from 1965 to 1969. Vice chairman during this period was Arne B. Mollén, who also became Jahre's successor.

== Honors ==
- Royal Norwegian Order of St. Olav - knighted in 1 Class
- Order of Dannebrog - knighted in 1 Class

Sporting positions
Preceded by	President of the Football Association of Norway; 1963–1965	Succeeded by
Preceded by position created	Chairman of the Norwegian Olympic Committee; 1965–1969	Succeeded by Arne B. Mollén
