= Aage Møst =

Norwegian journalist and sports official

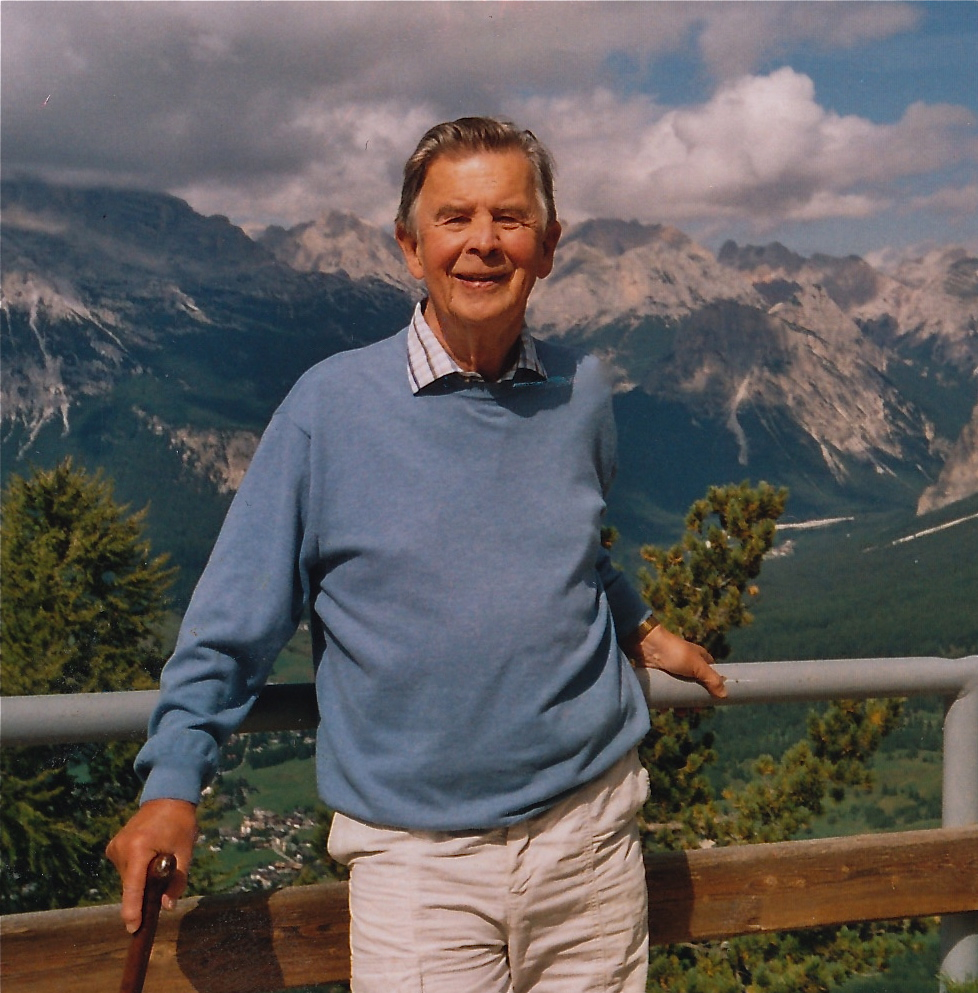
Aage Møst.

Aage Møst (29 August 1923 – 19 April 2011) was a Norwegian journalist and sports official.

He was born in Skotselv. He represented the clubs Bakke IF, Oslo-Studentenes IK, IL Tyrving and Høvik IF during his career. He was a journalist by education, and worked in Drammens Tidende, Sportsmanden and for many years in Aftenposten. In 1968, he left Aftenposten, and started writing for Byggeindustrien. He was active in the Norwegian Specialized Press Association and the editors' union Fagpressens redaktørforening.

When he was 27 years old, he was elected to the association board of directors of the Norwegian Athletics Association. He was the secretary in 1951, vice president from 1954 to 1955 and in 1956 he was elected president of the federation, a position he held until 1964. After he resigned as president, he continued to work in related areas until 1995. Among others, he was a member of the law committee from 1967 to 1974 and chaired the financial committee from 1969 to 1970. Møst also worked within the Norwegian Olympic Committee from 1965 until 1984.

Sporting positions
Preceded by Arne B. Mollén	President of the Norwegian Athletics Association; 1956–1964	Succeeded by Per Sonerud
