= Lars Thorstensen Tønsager =

Norwegian politician

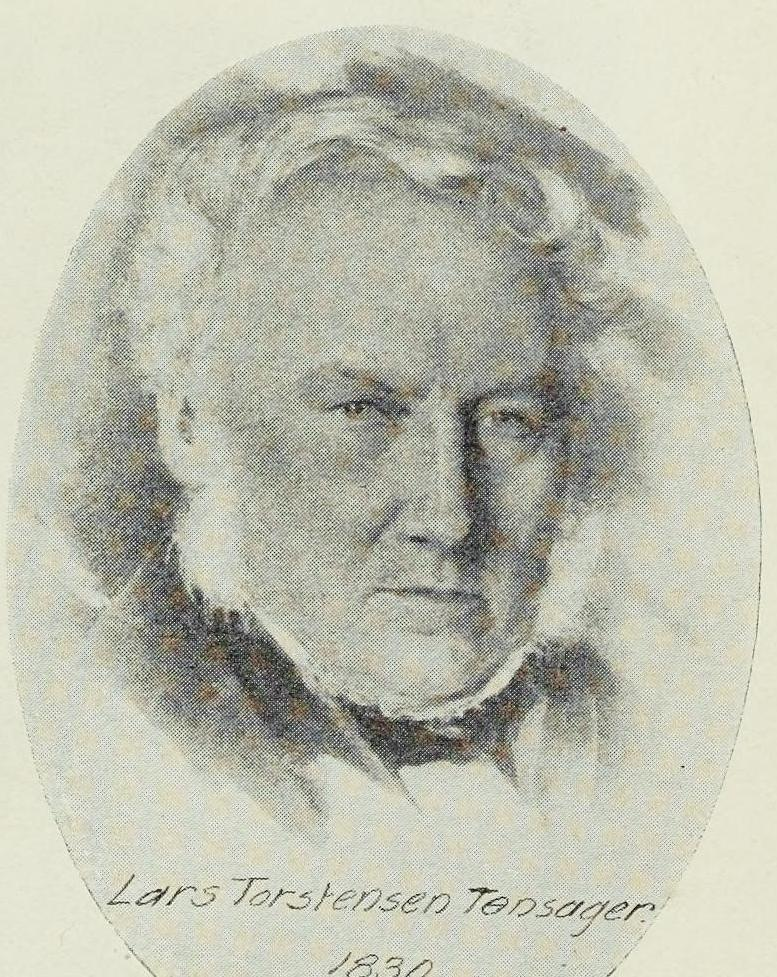
Lars Thorstensen Tønsager

Lars Thorstensen Tønsager (14 November 1788 – 27 May 1873) was a Norwegian politician.

He was elected to the Norwegian Parliament in 1830, 1836, 1842, 1845, 1848 and 1851, representing the rural constituency of Akershus Amt. He was also a deputy representative in 1833. He worked as a farmer. He was also mayor of Eidsvoll.

He is an ancestor of Alf R. Bjercke.
