= Women's football in Norway =

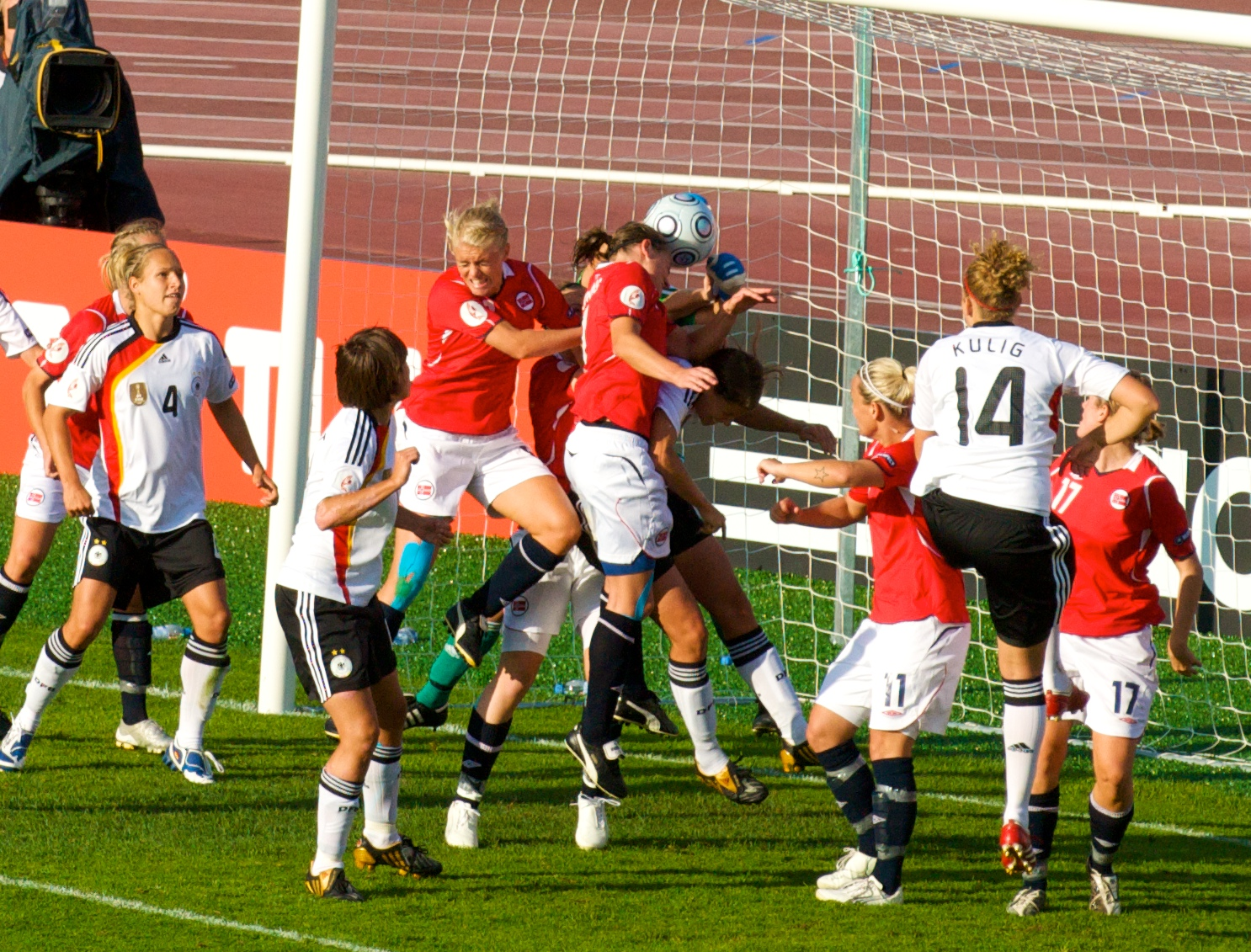
- Players fight for the ball during the match between Germany and Norway in UEFA Euro 2009 Women's European Championship in Tampere, Finland.
- Country: Norway
- Governing body: Football Association of Norway
- National team: Women's national team

National competitions
- FIFA Women's World Cup; UEFA Women's Championship

Club competitions
- League: Toppserien; 1. divisjon; Cups: Norwegian Women's Cup

International competitions
- UEFA Women's Champions League

Women's football in Norway is one of the traditional powers of women's football. The Norwegian Women's Football Championship is a tournament reserved for women's football teams divided into six levels, consisting of a national championship in the top three under the management of the Norwegian Football Association (NFF), while the lower ones are managed by various regional associations. Toppserien is the biggest football division in Norway by importance and is followed by the 1st division hierarchy. The Norwegian football system consists of a series of alloys linked to each other by hierarchy through promotions and relegations. In each division the teams face an Italian round with round-trip matches. Three points are assigned to the winning team, one point for each team in the event of a draw and zero points for the losing team.

== History ==
Women's football has been played in Norway as early as 1928. Målfrid Kuvås is widely considered the mother of women's Norwegian football and was instrumental in getting the ban of women's football in Norway reversed. The Norwegian Football Federation (NFF) first officially recognised women's football in 1976 and the first national team was established two years later with Per Pettersen becoming Norway's first manager. The first ever win for the female national side came against Northern Ireland and the first major achievement came in 1987 when they won the European Championship after beating Sweden in the final.

== National competition ==
The highest level is the Toppserien, a division consisting of 12 teams, which assigns the champion title of Norway. From the Toppserien they are relegated to 1. division the teams ranked at the last two places of the final standings. The second level is represented by the 1st division, created in 1996 and consisting of 12 teams. The first two classifieds of the 1st. division are promoted in Toppserien, while the last two are back in 2nd division. The third level is represented by the 2nd division, consisting of groups with a variable number of up to 12 teams each, geographically divided. The winning teams of the nine groups, the first two of only group 1, are facing to define the two teams promoted in 1. division, while the relegations are individually managed by the regional associations.

Level	League(s)/Division(s)
1	Toppserien; 10 clubs
2	First Division; 10 clubs
3–6	The Second Division through the Fifth Division are regional divisions administered by the various regional football associations.

== National team ==
The Norway women's national football team, organised by the Football Association of Norway, have a history of success on the international stage, winning both the 1995 FIFA Women's World Cup and the gold medal at the 2000 Olympics. In 2017 the Football Association decided that men and women will get equal pay.

== See also ==
- Football in Norway
