= Maria Amelie =

Russian-born writer and blogger (born 1985)

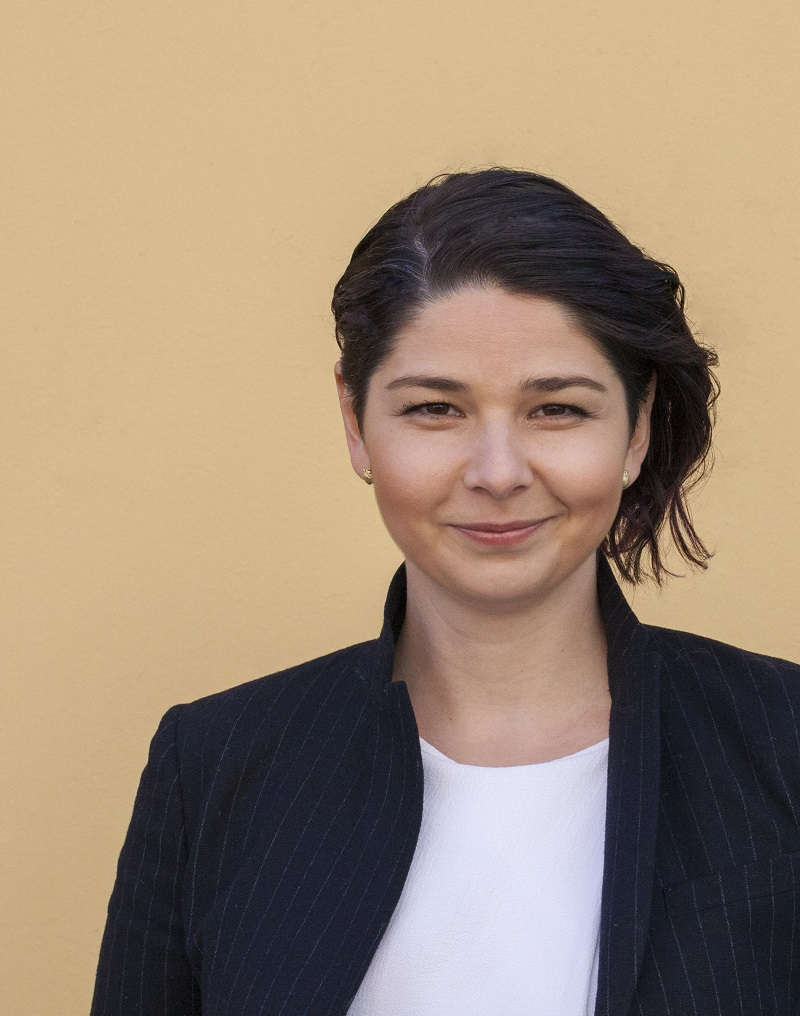
- Born: 30 May 1985 (age 41); Vladikavkaz, North Ossetian ASSR, Soviet Union
- Other names: Madina Salamova, Maria Bidzikoeva
- Education: Norwegian University of Science and Technology
- Occupation: Writer
- Notable work: Ulovlig norsk ("Illegally Norwegian")

Madina Salamova (born 30 May 1985), better known by the pseudonym Maria Amelie, is a Russian-born writer, blogger and entrepreneur who lived as an illegal immigrant in Norway between 2002 and 2011. She was deported from Norway to Russia on 24 January 2011.

She arrived in Finland together with her family in 2000 as asylum seekers. After being turned down for asylum there, they travelled to Norway and filed an application for asylum there in 2002. The application was turned down by Norwegian immigration authorities, and the appeal was turned down by the Norwegian Immigration Appeals Board in 2003. She and her family then filed a lawsuit, but the Oslo District Court found in favor of the decision of March 2004. After the verdict Maria Amelie and her family went into hiding.

After writing the controversial book Ulovlig norsk (Illegally Norwegian) she was in 2010 named "Norwegian of the year" by the Norwegian news magazine Ny Tid, because of her contributions to the public debate on the political and social rights of undocumented immigrants in Norway. In 2011, she became the center of a political controversy when she was arrested outside the Nansen Academy after a speaking engagement, and denied asylum or residency on humanitarian grounds in Norway. The Oslo District Court originally remanded her into custody until her deportation, but she was released after appealing to Borgarting Appeals Court. The police appealed further to Supreme Court, but the Court rejected the appeal.

The interest from the media after her arrest was extensive. In the first five days after she was arrested, more than 550 articles were written about her in print newspapers, and her name has been frequently mentioned in Norwegian television news broadcasts. Her Facebook support page has gained more than 88,000 supporters and the Norwegian Amnesty International has its own signature campaign for Maria Amelie that by 23 January 2011 had over 28,000 signatures.

On 24 January 2011, Maria Amelie was deported from Norway to Russia.

Two Icelandic politicians submitted a proposal to Alþingi to give her Icelandic citizenship because of Norway's 'inhumane treatment' of her, an offer she has expressed great thankfulness for and which she has describes as a "miracle" and an act which "warms her heart".

On 16 April 2011, Maria Amelie returned to Norway after having been granted a work permit.
