= Kåre Elgmork =

Norwegian zoologist

Kåre Elgmork (7 December 1924 – 19 November 2011) was a Norwegian zoologist.

He was born in Hønefoss. He took the dr.philos. degree in 1959, was appointed as a docent at the University of Oslo in 1964 and promoted to professor in 1985. His special fields were freshwater ecology, later the study of bears of Norway. He was a fellow of the Norwegian Academy of Science and Letters since 1986 and was decorated as a Knight of the Order of St. Olav. He died in November 2011 in Bærum, having resided at Ringstabekk.
