= Erik Stallemo =

Erik Stallemo (16 June 1935 – 11 May 2011) was a Norwegian shipbroker, sports official and football agent. He had two tenures as chairman of IK Start and one tenure as chairman of Start's football committee.

== Career ==
He hailed from Grim in Kristiansand. He left school after completing primary education, and in 1950 he started working for the shipbroker's company Johan G. Olsen. He rose in the ranks to become a department director. Some 27–28 years later he quit this job, tried his luck with his own company Stallemo Partners, but it went defunct. He worked as a shipbroker in Stavanger for some years. He was the founder, and from 1987 to 2007 chief executive, of Westshore Shipbrokers. In 2007 he changed position to chairman.

He joined the sports club IK Start right after the Second World War, and served as chairman of the multi-sports club from 1962 to 1965 and 1992 to 1995. He was best known as chairman of the football committee from 1976 to 1981, the period when Start won two league titles in 1978 and 1980. In 2005 he was named as an honorary member of the club.

He has also been a board member and chaired the election committee of Serieforeningen. It has been written that Stallemo was Norway's first football agent. He negotiated loans and transfers for such players as Svein Mathisen, Isak Arne Refvik, Rune Bratseth, Arve Seland, Olav Klepp, Einar Jan Aas, Arne Dokken, Arne Larsen Økland and Åge Hareide.
