= Sigurd Müller (police chief) =

Norwegian police chief

Sigurd Müller (5 May 1924 – 28 May 2011) was a Norwegian chief of police and judge.

== Biography ==
Müller was born in Fredrikstad on 5 May 1924. During the German occupation of Norway, he had to flee the country, enrolling in the Norwegian police troops in Sweden. Joining the regular police force after the war's end, he was stationed in Fredrikstad until 1953. During this time he also graduated from the Police Academy in 1948, and took the cand.jur. degree at the University of Oslo in 1951.

After a period as deputy judge in Sarpsborg, he rose through the police ranks in Haugesund from 1956, Vest-Finnmark from 1957 and Sarpsborg from 1962. Müller then served as police inspector in Oslo from 1963 to 1975, chief of police of Bergen from 1976 to 1982 and chief justice of Moss District Court from 1982 to 1994.

Police appointments
Preceded by Asbjørn Bryhn	Chief of Police of Bergen; 1976–1982	Succeeded by Oskar Hordnes
