= Arne Lindaas =

Norwegian painter, printmaker, sculptor and glassmaker

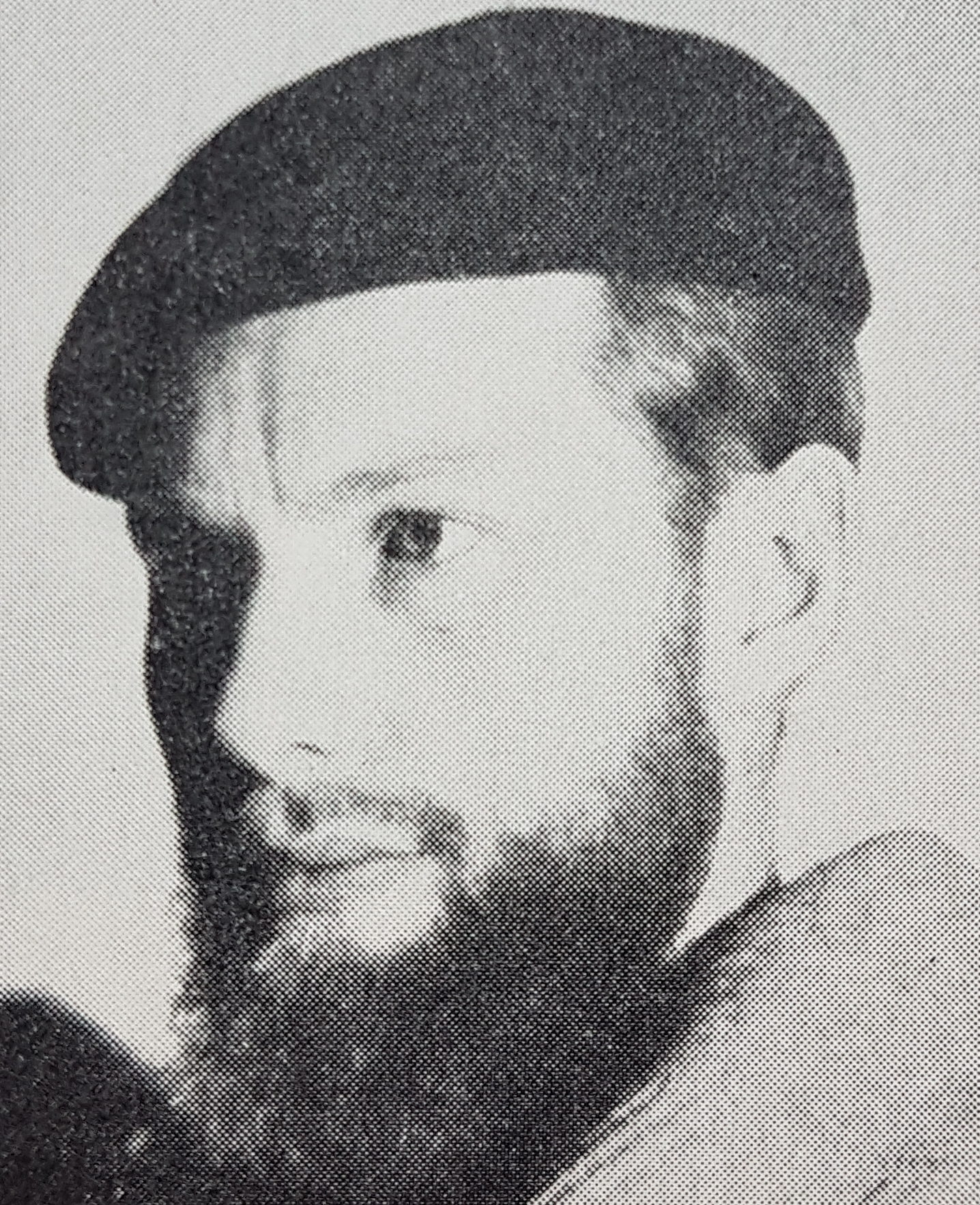

Arne Lindaas (8 April 1924 – 10 October 2011) was a Norwegian painter, printmaker, sculptor and glassmaker.

He was born in Botne Municipality as a son of pharmacists Waldemar Lindaas and Signe Anna Fredrikke Colbjørnsen Abildgaard; his father was also an amateur painter. He attended the Norwegian National Academy of Craft and Art Industry from 1943 to 1949.

In the late 1940s and early 1950s he was a designer for Norsk Glassverk and Porsgrunds Porselænsfabrik. He was later an artist working on various grants, interspersed with periods as an art teacher.

Whereas his first solo exhibition was in 1949 at Kunstnerforbundet, he took part in collective exhibitions such as the Autumn Exhibition 13 times between 1946 and 1978, and the Milan Triennale four times between 1954 and 1973, receiving a diplôme d'honneur at his first two Milan Triennales. His works are owned, among others, by the National Gallery of Norway, Riksgalleriet, the National Museum of Decorative Arts and Design, the Norwegian Museum of Decorative Arts and Design, the West Norway Museum of Decorative Art, the National Museum of Sweden and the Virginia Museum of Fine Arts.

Lindaas was also involved in several artist organisations. He was, among others, a board member of Foreningen Norske Grafikere from 1951 to 1960, chair of Foreningen Brukskunst from 1958 to 1959 and jury member for Norsk Designsentrum between 1968 and 1970.

He resided in Rømskog Municipality and died here at the age of 87.
