= Karl E. Nilsen =

Norwegian artist

Karl Erik Nilsen (22 July 1945 – 2 December 2011) was a Norwegian artist.

He was born in Oslo and took his education at the Norwegian National Academy of Craft and Art Industry. His main art form was sculpting, but he was also a painter, graphic artist and illustrator. Illustrating assignments include the book series Hellemyrsfolket. His work is owned by the National Gallery of Norway, the National Touring Exhibitions and Oslo Municipality. He died in 2011.
