= Johan Henrik Dahl =

Norwegian diplomat (1928–2011)

Johan Henrik Dahl (15 August 1928 – 2 July 2011) was a Norwegian diplomat.

He held an MBA degree and started working for the Norwegian Ministry of Foreign Affairs in 1953. He was posted in Bremen, Cape Town, Bern, London and Geneva. In 1975 he was appointed as an assistant secretary in the Ministry of Foreign Affairs. After a stint from 1978 as embassy counsellor in Washington, DC he became the Ministry's special adviser on petroleum and energy affairs in 1983. In that respect he was also Norway's ambassador to the International Energy Agency.

Dahl rounded off his career as the Norwegian ambassador to Thailand (also covering Vietnam, Laos and Cambodia) from 1989 to 1993 and ambassador to Zimbabwe (also covering Botswana, Mozambique and Angola) from 1993 to 1997. He was decorated as a Commander of the Order of St. Olav. He settled in Holmestrand and died shortly before his 83rd birthday.
