= Kjell Eide =

Norwegian civil servant

Kjell Eide (15 September 1925 – 29 October 2011) was a Norwegian civil servant.

He was born in Ås, a son of Erling Eide, and was an economist by profession. From 1960 to 1961 he was a secretary for Per Kleppe in the Kleppe Committee. He worked for OECD from 1961 to 1964 and was a deputy under-secretary of state in the Ministry of Education and Church Affairs from 1964 to 1995. He wrote several books. He died in October 2011.
