= Martin Alexander Kloster-Jensen =

Norwegian linguist

- Born: 23 February 1917; Ringerike, Norway
- Died: 17 March 2011 (aged 94); Bærum
- Occupation: Linguist

Martin Alexander Kloster-Jensen (23 February 1917 – 17 March 2011) was a Norwegian linguist.

Kloster-Jensen was born in Ringerike. He graduated as dr.philos. in 1961. From 1963 to 1966 he was appointed professor at the University of Bonn. From 1966 to 1975 he was professor in phonetics at the University of Bergen. He was appointed professor in Hamburg from 1975 to 1983, and was assigned with the University of Oslo from 1983 to 1995. His works include Tonemicity from 1961, and several textbooks in phonetics.
