= Anton Smith-Meyer =

Norwegian diplomat (1919–2011)

Anton Smith-Meyer (21 June 1919 – 2011) was a Norwegian diplomat.

Smith-Meyer participated in the Allied naval forces during the Second World War. He graduated from the Norwegian Naval Academy and started working for the Norwegian Ministry of Foreign Affairs in 1949. He served in Buenos Aires, San Francisco, London and Copenhagen before being posted as consul-general in Bombay in 1967. He was then consul-general in Liverpool from 1970, Hamburg from 1975 and the Norwegian ambassador to Venezuela from 1984 to 1987. Best remembered as a consul, he was decorated as a Commander of the Order of St. Olav in 1986 as well as the Venezuelan Order of the Liberator and the Order of the Dannebrog.

Smith-Meyer also wrote a memoir on his escape from invaded and occupied Norway, Skjebneflukten (1998), and a book on Norway-Germany relations, Forsoning i vår tid 1945–1980 (2000).
