= Lavangsdalen =

Valley in Troms, Norway

Coordinates: 69.47133°N 19.24644°E

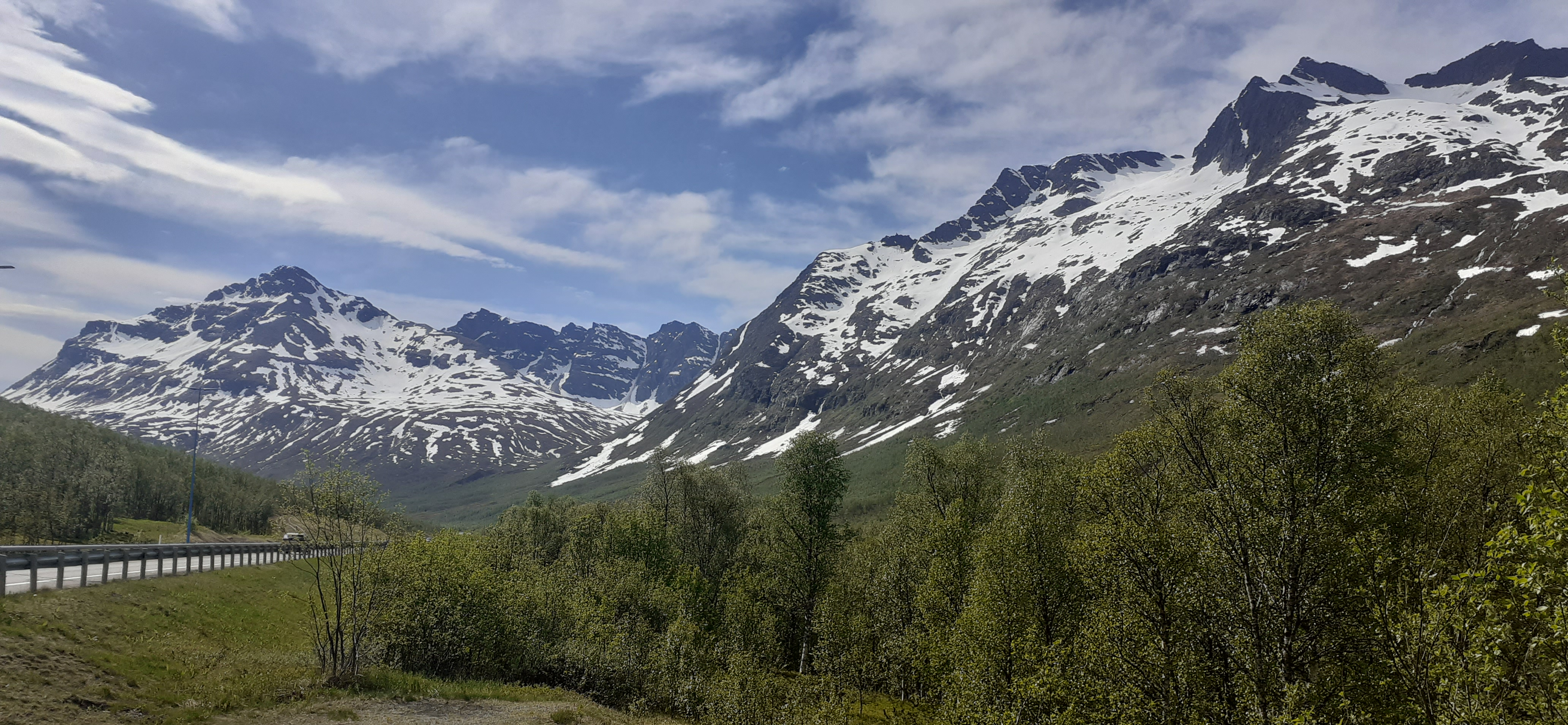
View of Andersdaltinden from Sarasteinen in Lavangsdalen

Lavangsdalen (Northern Sami: Lávákvuovdi) is a valley in Troms, Norway. It runs from Lavangen at Balsfjorden in Balsfjord Municipality northwards to Sørbotn in the end of Ramfjorden in Tromsø Municipality. The valley is mainly known for its stretch of the European route E8, a road branching off from the E6 at Nordkjosbotn to Tromsø. Being the most accident-prone road in Northern Norway alongside National Road 80, the valley is known for a 2011 bus accident that killed 5 people.

== Accidents and incidents ==
On 20 July 2004, a 25-year-old man and a 70-year-old woman were killed in a collision. Both were in Nissan Primeras, the woman as a passenger of the second vehicle. The emergency authorities explained that the man, driving southwards in the first vehicle, tried to overtake several cars, noticed an oncoming car, and tried to turn back into his lane. Hitting one of the cars he had tried to overtake, he spun into the oncoming car. The emergency responders also blamed the younger driver for excessive speed. Rain also played a role.

On 23 June 2005, a car collided head-on with a van with an attached caravan. The front half of the car was demolished by the van, and the car's driver and passenger died immediately. In the van, all five occupants were hospitalized. Less than a month later, a family of four drove a rental car that spun out of control and flipped multiple times, probably due to negligent driving. There were no fatalities.

On 17 November 2006, a non-lethal car crash happened near the southern end of the valley. A car with two brothers and two sisters halted to respond. A fourth car passed by and hit the two women, who were injured and collected by emergency helicopter. One of the young women had been in a snowmobile accident three years prior that killed her brother. Three men were indicted in Nord-Troms District Court; two who were accused of causing the initial crash, as well as the driver who later hit the responders. The last was acquitted, whereas the first two were given short prison sentences. Shortly after the 2008 trial, a landslide blocked the entire Lavangsdalen valley. The landslide was about 80 metres wide.

On 2 March 2007, a 19-year-old woman died in Tromsø Hospital from injuries sustained in a crash at the municipal border between Balsford and Tromsø. This time, the road was highly slippery. She was the driver of a small car that turned 180 degrees, swerved into the opposite lane and hit a trailer truck. With the backside of her car being crushed, she initially survived the accident before succumbing later the same day. Drivers in the area criticized the snow plowing in Lavangsdalen at the time for being inadequate.

On 10 August 2008, a car swerved off the road just ahead of a bridge, continued about 70 metres, cut down a number of large trees and ended on its roof in the small river that runs under the bridge. There were no guard rails at the location, where the road was relatively straight. Based on the car's mowing down of the trees, police suspected excessive speed. The driver was pronounced dead on arrival.

The Norwegian National Road Policing Service stated that they patrolled Lavangsdalen some time during the day, every single day. Despite being fairly short, European route E8 in Troms had become the most accident-prone in Northern Norway alongside National Road 80. From 2000 to 2010, 17 people died in 10 accidents; of these, 4 accidents with 6 fatalities took place in Lavangsdalen. The death toll would rise drastically in 2011.

=== 2011 accident and aftermath ===
The Lavangsdalen bus accident (Norwegian: Lavangsdalen-ulykken) was a bus crash in northern Norway on 7 January 2011. On the European route E8, a car headed north towards Tromsø was about to pass a bus headed south towards Nordkjosbotn, but entered the opposing lane and crashed into the bus. The bus rotated into a horizontal position, and other vehicles subsequently slammed into the bus. Five persons were killed.

"A physical division between the lanes is an absolute demand", stated physician and politician Mads Gilbert, who labelled the 22 deaths in the 2000s as a "massacre". Yet another person died in July 2011, when a driver crashed through the guard rail, stopping in the adjacent trees.

In February 2011, Minister of Transport Magnhild Meltveit Kleppa vowed to install a median barrier in Lavangsdalen. The first monetary allocation came in the fall of 2011, and the pre-project was fully financed by May 2012. The total cost was stipulated at 220 million kr. The work would start in August 2012, erecting a median barrier in a 9,6 km stretch between Sørbotn and Storskreda. The road would also be widened, special lanes for overtaking would be built, as well as more shoulder-like outdents. Road authorities believed that the accidents would be reduced by 70 to 80%. Some criticized the authorities for prioritizing the wrong stretch of road.

=== 2021 accident and aftermath ===
On 31 January 2021, a man and a woman died in a head-on collision at Kantornes in the far south of the valley. They were driver and passenger in a car that seemingly swerved into the opposite lane.

Following the 2021 accident, the local fire and rescue leader called for a larger stretch of road to be improved with medians. The Minister of Transport in Solberg's Cabinet, Knut Arild Hareide, was reluctant to include medians in the National Transport Plan, but he was pressured by the parliamentary opposition. With the Solberg's Cabinet being a minority government, they usually relied on support from the Progress Party, but the Progress Party representative, Per-Willy Amundsen, gave an ultimatum to vote down the National Transport Plan if the plan did not include more medians in Lavangsdalen. The rest of the parliamentary opposition from Troms supported the ultimatum, and in June 2021, Parliament voted to allocate 500 million kr to medians in the area.
