= Knut Olsen =

Norwegian journalist

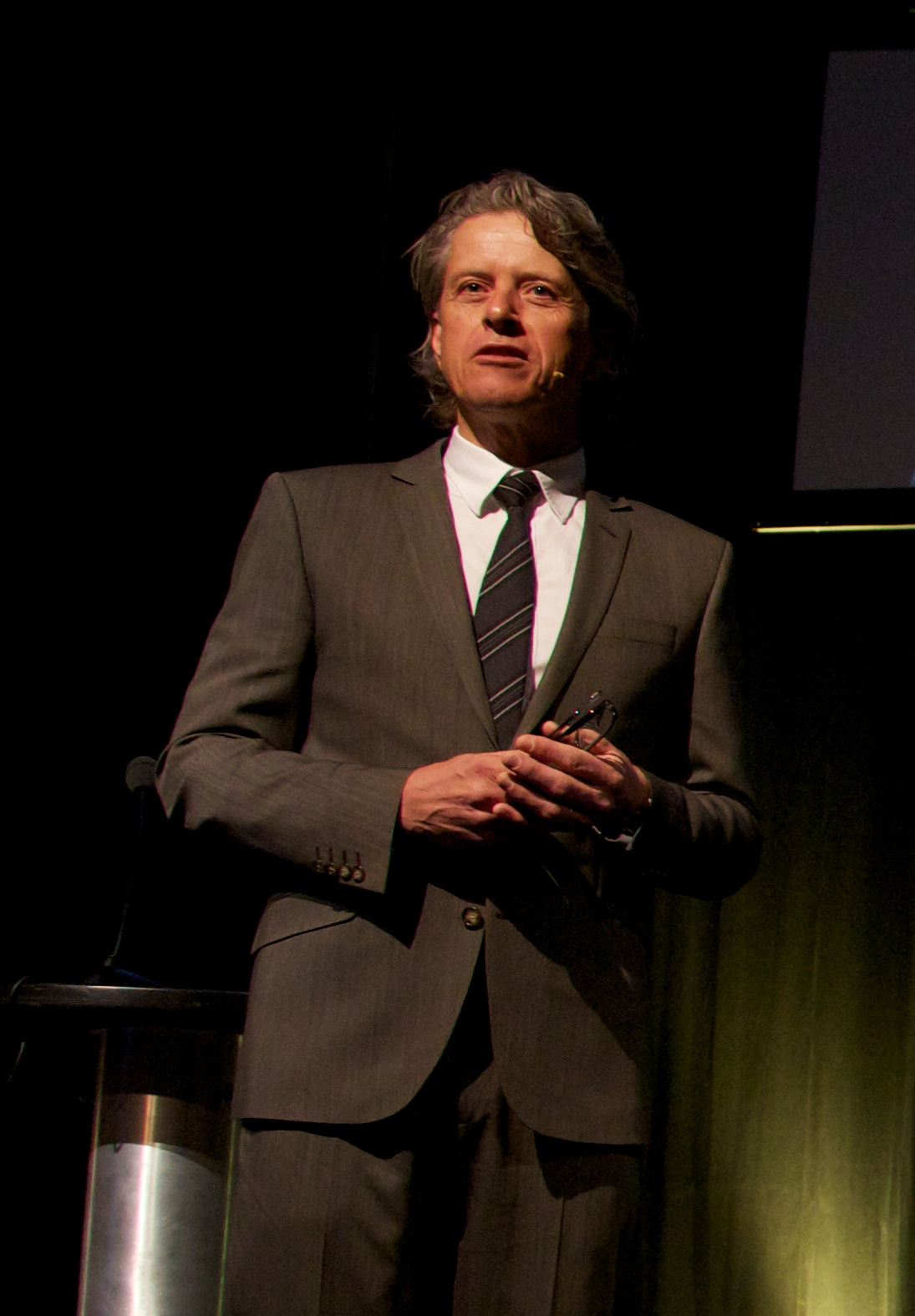
Knut Olsen, 2010

Knut Olsen (July 26, 1953 in Bærum – January 11, 2011) was a journalist for the Norwegian Broadcasting Corporation (NRK) since 1983. Starting in 2008 he was the news anchor together with Nina Owing. He also led various political debate programs. He died from cancer on January 11, 2011.

His daughter, Thea Olsen, has after his death worked as sports-anchor in TV 2.
