= Oskar Hordnes =

Norwegian police chief

Oskar Hordnes (26 October 1924 – 19 June 2011) was a Norwegian judge and chief of police.

He was born in Bergen. After graduating with the cand.jur. degree from the Royal Frederick University in 1949, he eventually became a police officer in his hometown. In 1970 he advanced to chief detective. From 1975 to 1982 he was a presiding judge in Gulating Court of Appeal, and from 1982 to 1992 he was the chief of police of Bergen.

Police appointments
| Preceded by Sigurd Müller | Chief of Police of Bergen; 1982–1992 | Succeeded by Rolf B. Wegner |
