= Rolf Aalerud =

Norwegian politician

Rolf Aalerud (6 December 1921 - 22 May 2011) was a Norwegian engineer and politician for the Christian Democratic Party.

He served as a deputy representative to the Parliament of Norway from Hedmark during the term 1981–1985. In total, he met during 1 day of parliamentary session. In 1953 he founded his own engineering company in the heating, ventilation, and air conditioning field. The company evolved into the limited company Aalerud. He resided in Brumunddal.
