= Birger Blom-Kalstø =

Norwegian politician (1940–2011)

Birger Blom-Kalstø (29 February 1940 – 3 July 2011) was a Norwegian politician for the Conservative Party.

He was born Avaldsnes. He finished his secondary education in 1960, and graduated in business administration in 1963. He worked as a manager for Hauske konfeksjon in Torvastad Municipality from 1967 to 1978, then with his own company from 1978 until retiring in 1996.

He chaired the local branch of the Conservative Party in Karmøy Municipality from 1968 to 1970. He was a deputy representative to the Parliament of Norway from Rogaland during the terms 1969–1973 and 1977–1981. In total he met during 149 days of parliamentary session.
