= Einar Tandberg-Hanssen =

Norwegian-American astrophysicist

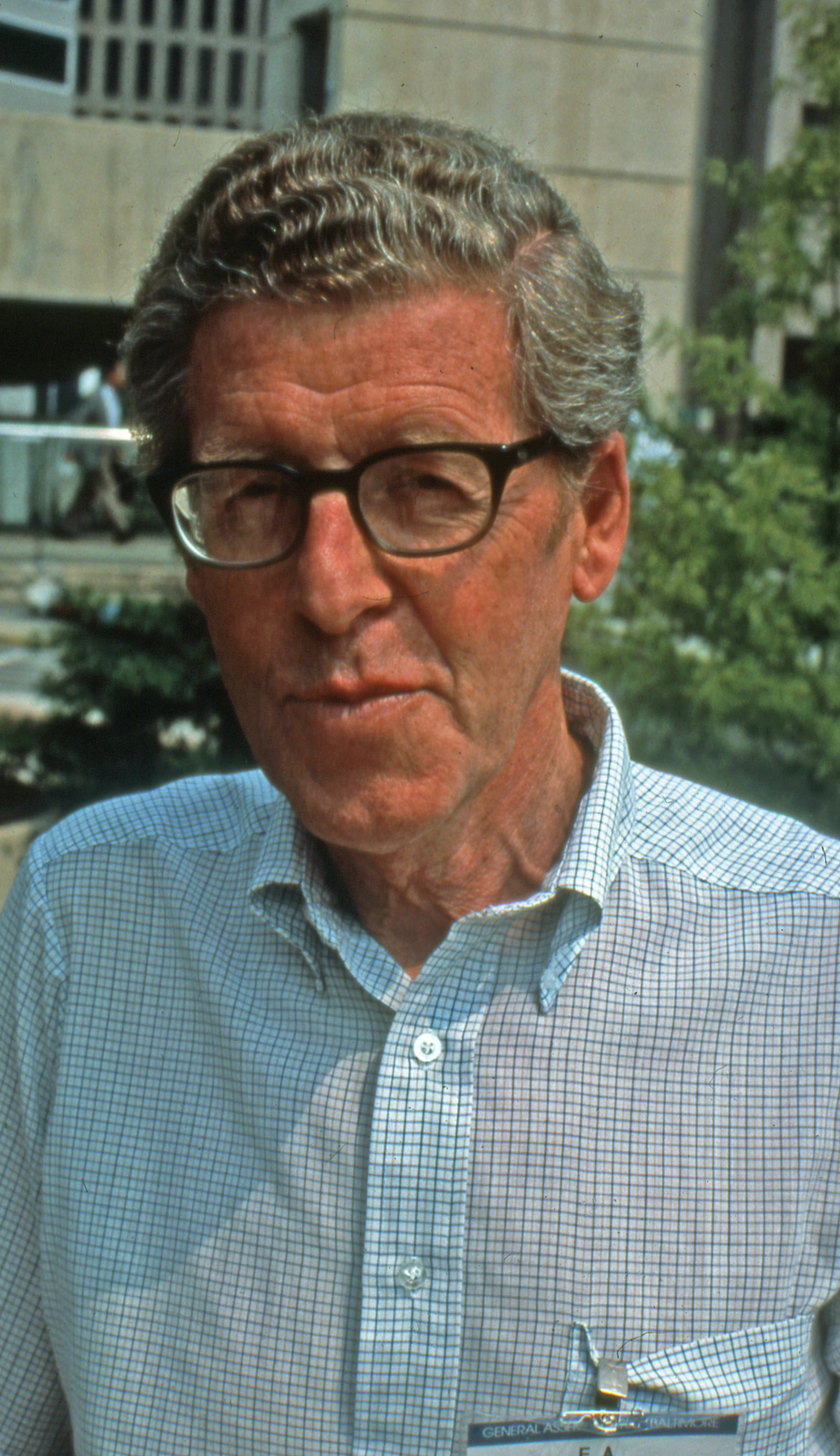
- Tanberg-Hanssen in 1988
- Born: Einar A. Tandberg-Hanssen; August 6, 1921; Bergen, Norway
- Died: July 22, 2011 (aged 89); Huntsville, Alabama, US
- Education: University of Oslo
- Scientific career
- Fields: solar physics
- Workplaces: High Altitude Observatory, NASA Marshall Space Flight Center, University of Alabama
- Thesis: An Investigation of the Temperature Conditions in Prominence with a Special Study of the Excitation of Helium (1960)

Einar A. Tandberg-Hanssen (6 August 1921 – 22 July 2011) was a Norwegian-American astrophysicist with a specialty in solar physics.

== Background ==
Tandberg-Hanssen was born in Bergen, Norway. He was the son of Birger Tandberg-Hanssen (1883-1951) and Mona Meier (1895-1967). He grew up in Langesund and Skien where he finished his secondary education in 1941. He took his undergraduate degree in astronomy at the University of Oslo in 1950, and after fellowships at Institut d'astrophysique de Paris, Caltech, High Altitude Observatory and the Cavendish Laboratory, he took his doctorate at the University of Oslo in 1960. His thesis was titled An Investigation of the Temperature Conditions in Prominence with a Special Study of the Excitation of Helium.

== Career ==
Tandberg-Hanssen was briefly a professor at the University in Oslo, before working at the High Altitude Observatory in Boulder, Colorado from 1961 to 1974. He was then a senior research scientist, later deputy director at the Space Science Laboratory at NASA's Marshall Space Flight Center in Huntsville, Alabama. From 1987 to 1993 he was the director of the Space Science Lab. After retiring, he also served part-time as professor of physics at the University of Alabama.

Tandberg-Hanssen was vice president of Commission 10 of the International Astronomical Union from 1979 to 1982 and president from 1982 to 1985. He was president of the Federation of Astronomical and Geophysical Data Analysis Services from 1990 to 1994. He was a fellow of the Norwegian Academy of Science and Letters from 1982 and received the NASA Exceptional Service Medal. He died in July 2011 in Huntsville.

== Selected works ==
- Solar Activity (1967)
- Solar Prominences (1974)
- The Physics of Solar Flares (1988)
- The Nature of Solar Prominences (1995)
- The Physics of Solar Flares (2009)
- Solar and Interplanetary Dynamics (2013)
