= Peter Sjøholt =

Norwegian geographer (1925–2011)

Peter Sjøholt (8 July 1925 – 14 July 2011) was a Norwegian geographer.

He hailed from Sjøholt in Ørskog Municipality. He finished his secondary education in 1944, and graduated from the University of Oslo with the cand. philol. degree in geography in 1955. He took the dr. philos. degree at the University of Bergen in 1982.

Sjøholt worked as a high school teacher from 1956 to 1963, and a research fellow from 1963 to 1966. From 1967 to 1974 he was a consultant in urban planning. He became a docent in economic geography at the Norwegian School of Economics and Business Administration (NHH) in 1974, and was promoted to professor in 1986. He stepped down as a professor in 1995, but worked until 2002 as a coordinator for NNH's research collaboration with Central American universities. He had previously been a visiting scholar at universities in both Latin America and North America. He was also involved in administrating research in NAVF and the Research Council of Norway.

Sjøholt penned about 180 academic publications, and also contributed in the form of popular science. He is a member of the New York Academy of Sciences and the Norwegian Academy of Science and Letters from 1990. He still lived in Bergen after his retirement, but died in July 2011.
