= Ulf Aas =

Norwegian illustrator (1919–2011)

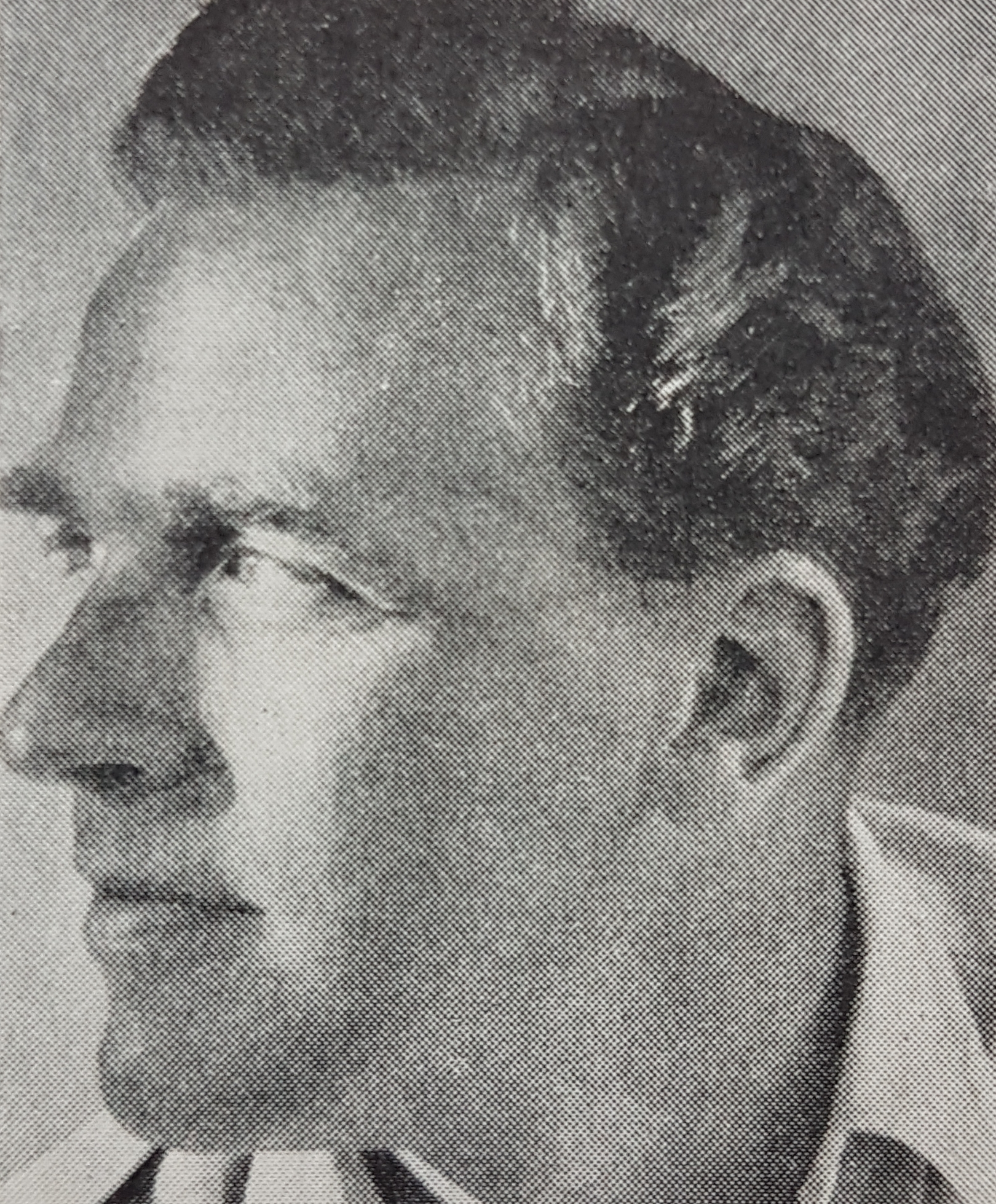
Norwegian illustrator Ulf Aas

Ulf Aas (14 September 1919 – 16 December 2011) was a Norwegian illustrator. He worked for the newspaper Aftenposten from 1948 (full-time from 1977). He has contributed with illustrations to more than 200 books. He was decorated Knight, First Class of the Royal Norwegian Order of St. Olav in 1999.

He also made advertising illustrations.
