= Målfrid Kuvås =

Norwegian footballer (1942–2011)

Personal information
- Date of birth: 2 February 1942
- Place of birth: Børsa, Norway
- Date of death: 12 May 2011 (aged 69)

Målfrid Kuvås (2 February 1942 – 12 May 2011) is a Norwegian advocate for women's football in Norway who helped to reverse the ban on the sport and to Norway getting their first games. Kuvås is widely viewed as the mother of Norwegian women's football.
