= Axel Seeberg =

Norwegian archaeologist

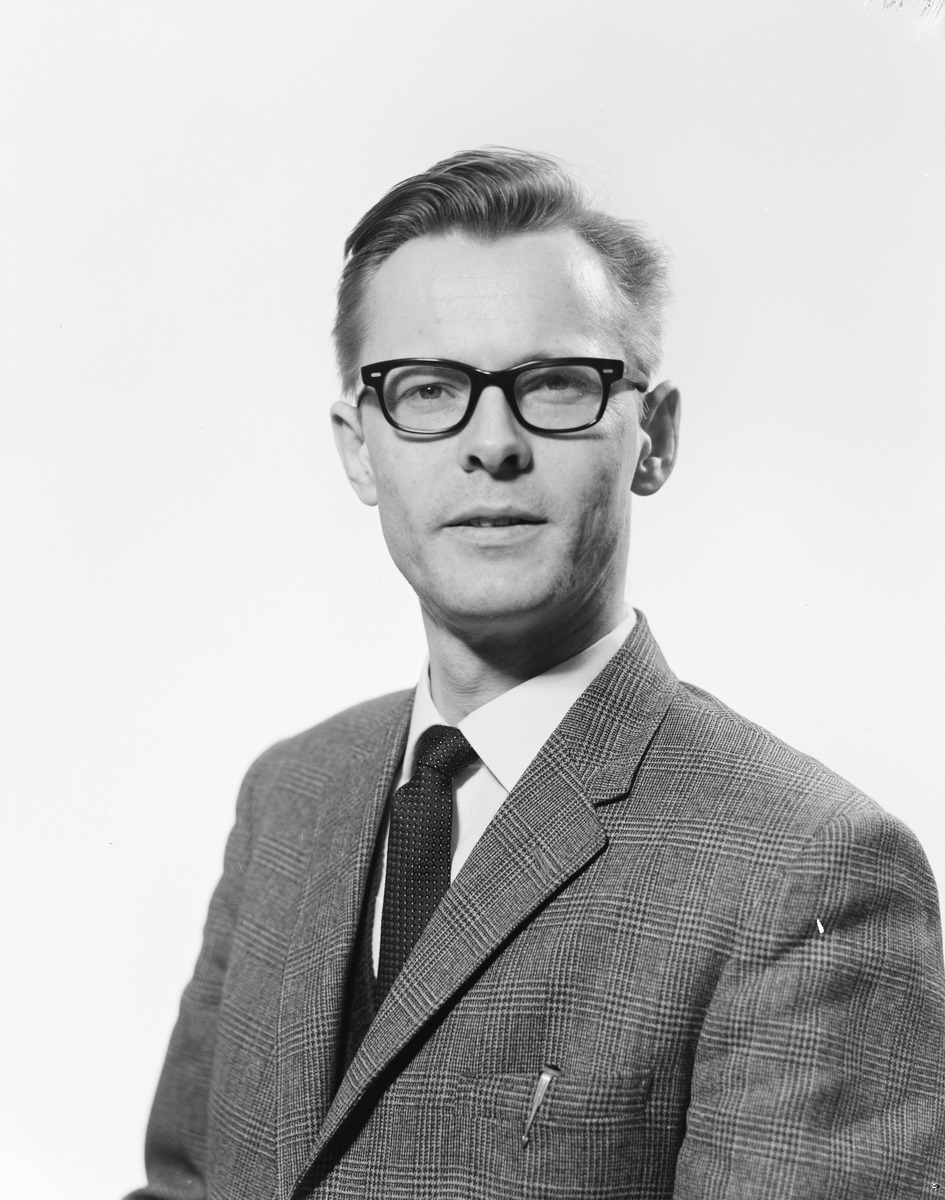
Axel Seeberg. 1966

Axel Seeberg (11 February 1931 – 6 February 2011) was a Norwegian archaeologist. He was a professor of classical archaeology at the University of Oslo.

== Biography ==
Seeberg was born in Oslo, Norway. He attended upper secondary school at Ullern and graduated with a degree in art. After finishing his secondary education in 1949, he studied classical archaeology in Oslo, as well as the 1952-53 semester at University College London under T.B.L. Webster (1905–74). After graduating, Seeberg worked at the University of Oslo from 1956. From 1974 to 2001 he served as a professor of classical archaeology.

Seeberg was also a translator who translated works by P.G. Wodehouse. He was a fellow of the Norwegian Academy of Science and Letters from 1982. He resided at Bestum where he died in 2011 at nearly 80 years old.
