= Herman Hagen =

Norwegian jurist (1918–2011)

Herman Anton Hagen (1918 – 18 June 2011) was a Norwegian jurist.

He hailed from Molde and was a lawyer by occupation before entering the public sector. He was the chief administrative officer of Harstad Municipality and then Sandnes Municipality before being hired as the first chief executive officer of the Industrial Development Corporation of Norway in 1968. He remained here until his retirement in 1988. He moved back to Sandnes and lived here in his later life.

He was also a deputy board member of Strukturfinans.

Business positions
New office	Chief executive of the Industrial Development Corporation of Norway; 1968–1988	Succeeded by Harald Kjelstad
