= Kjell Elgjo =

Norwegian pathologist

Kjell Elgjo (1930 – 9 December 2011) was a Norwegian pathologist.

He took the Candidate of Medicine degree at the University of Oslo in 1956 and the Doctor Medicinae degree in 1966. He was a prosector at the University of Oslo from 1965, docent from 1969 and professor from 1978 to his retirement in 1996. Since 1985 he was a fellow of the Norwegian Academy of Science and Letters.
