= Bjørn Oscar Gulbrandsen =

Norwegian sportsman

Bjørn Oscar Gulbrandsen (17 September 1925 – 14 April 2011) was a Norwegian ice hockey player and yacht racer.

He was born in Bærum. He grew up at Stabekk and later lived at Hosle. He represented the club Stabæk IF in ice hockey, football and bandy. After Stabæk's ice hockey team was discontinued in 1955, he played some years for Gamlebyen IF. He won the national titles in bandy in 1952, 1953 and 1955 and in ice hockey in 1947. He was capped three times in bandy and 28 times in ice hockey. For the Norwegian national ice hockey team he also participated at the 1952 Winter Olympics, where the Norwegian team placed ninth and last.

He also took up yacht racing, where he represented the Royal Norwegian Yacht Club. He competed in sailing at the 1956 Summer Olympics in Melbourne, together with Thor Thorvaldsen, and finished seventh.
