= Leiv Mjeldheim =

Norwegian historian (1929–2011)

Leiv Mjeldheim (26 January 1929 – 12 October 2011) was a Norwegian historian.

He was born in Arna. He took the master's degree in political science in 1953. After a tenure as foreign affairs journalist in Bergens Tidende from 1955 to 1966 before being appointed as lecturer in history at the University of Bergen in 1966. He later served as professor from 1975 to his retirement in 1996, and was a specialist on Norwegian history around 1900. He was a fellow of the Norwegian Academy of Science and Letters.

Titles include Ministeriet Konow 1910–12 about Konow's Cabinet (1955), Politiske prosessar og institusjonar (1969), Det politiske system (1971), Parti og rørsle (1978) and Folkerørsla som vart parti. Venstre frå 1880-åra til 1905 about the Liberal Party (1984).
