= Museum for Northern Peoples =

Museum in Manndalen, Gáivuotna–Kåfjord, Norway

- Samtidsmuseet for nordlige folk (Norwegian); Davvi álbmogiid dálážiid musea (Northern Sami)
- Established: 21 July 2011
- Location: Manndalen, Gáivuotna Municipality, Norway
- Coordinates: 69°31′32″N 20°31′46″E
- Curator: Irina Haugane

The Museum for Northern Peoples (Norwegian: Samtidsmuseet for nordlige folk; Northern Sami: Davvi álbmogiid dálážiid musea) is a museum located at the Center for Northern Peoples in Manndalen in Gáivuotna Municipality (Kåfjord) in Troms county, Norway. It covers the art and culture of northern peoples, and regional Sami culture and history.

The museum was opened on 21 July 2011, by the Norwegian Minister of Cultural Affairs, Anniken Huitfeldt. The permanent collection is concerned with regional Sami culture and history; temporary thematic and art exhibits cover the broader field of the culture of the northern peoples as a whole, with an emphasis on women's traditions and handicrafts. Exhibition subjects have included traditional ways of carrying children, traditional art of the indigenous people of the Amur River in Russia using fish skins, the artist Nils-Aslak Valkeapää, and a house built by an eccentric in Nordreisa Municipality.

The museum uses Norwegian, Sami, and English names to reflect its international focus. It is a member of the Sami Museum Network and the Sami Museum Society.
