= Kjellaug Steinslett =

Norwegian writer (1946–2011)

Kjellaug Steinslett (9 July 1946 – 4 June 2011) was a Norwegian novelist best known for writing the novel series Kystfolket ("Coastal People").

She hailed from Helgeland and published her debut novel in 1996, and wrote 55 books in this series, in addition to another series, Kystens datter. Steinslett eventually moved to Spain; she died in June 2011 from cancer.
