= Norway-America Association =

The Norway-America Association (Norwegian: Norge-Amerika Foreningen, abbreviated to NORAM) is a Norwegian non-profit organization established in 1919. It works for increased cooperation between the United States and Norway within higher education. It gives about 0.5 million US dollars per year divided into seventy scholarships. The scholarships are awarded to Norwegian students studying in the U.S. or in Canada. They also offer scholarships to U.S. students who go to Norway for studies. A scholarship also exists for Norwegian politicians to study in Washington, DC, and for Norwegian lecturers to visit the United States.

The non-profit awards up to fifteen annual grants to support Americans admitted to postgraduate or research in Norway in areas of mutual importance to the U.S. and Norway. The goal of this program is to increase the knowledge and strengthen the ties between the two countries. All scholarship applicants must be members of the Norway-America Association, which charges a fee of 200 NOK per year.

It was established as the Norway-America Fund in 1919 and was founded by the American Scandinavian Foundation and Nordmanns-Forbundet. Its purpose was to expand and make the opportunity to pursue studies in the U.S. more available for resourceful, young Norwegians. King Haakon VII was the organization’s patron. It was inactive after the recession in 1929-35 but was operated by C. J. Hambro prior to World War II. With the German invasion of 1940, board chairman C. J. Hambro created a “Board in Exile” in Princeton, New Jersey. The Norway-America Fund merged with Amerikaforeningen in 1946 and received its current name. A grant known as Thanks to Scandinavia was established in New York in 1963. This grant was established as a way for American Jews to express their thanks to Scandinavian countries for their effort to help Jewish citizens evade German forces during the occupation. Another grant, the Norwegian Marshall Fund, was established in 1977 and awards scholarships to Americans pursuing studies or research in Norway. Erling Christophersen became an honorary member in 1978. H.M. King Harald V renewed his patronage for NORAM for another five years in 2010, continuing the tradition of patronage from H.M. King Olav and H.S. King Haakon VII.

NORAM’s partnership schools are:

- California Lutheran University (CLU) in Thousand Oaks, California
- Hawaii Pacific University (HPU) in Honolulu, Hawaii
- North Park University in Chicago, Illinois
- Pacific Lutheran University (PLU) in Parkland, Washington
- Clark University in Worcester, Massachusetts
- Concordia College in Moorhead, Minnesota
- St. Olaf College in Northfield, Minnesota
- University of St. Thomas in St. Paul, Minnesota
- State University of New York at Plattsburgh (SUNY Plattsburgh) in Plattsburgh, New York
- Central Washington University (CWU) in Ellensburg, Washington
