= Arne Eidsmo =

Norwegian politician

Arne Eidsmo (4 April 1941 – 16 October 2011) was a Norwegian politician for the Conservative Party.

He hailed from Tromsø, and for 42 years he was the regional director of the Confederation of Norwegian Enterprise in Northern Norway. He retired in April 2011. He also served as State Secretary in the Ministry of Fisheries from 1989 to 1990, in Syse's Cabinet. Eidsmo was also a freemason, since 1967, and the last two years of his life he was a "Provincial Master" in the organization. He died in October 2011 at the University Hospital of North Norway following short-term illness.
