= Willy Simonsen =

Norwegian sports official

Willy Raymond Simonsen (1927 – 26 February 2011) was a Norwegian sports executive.

He played football for Homansbyens BK during his youth, and after his active career he joined Årvoll IL. Simonsen spent his entire working career in the Football Association of Norway. He started as a delivery boy in 1946. He later held tasks such as judicial adviser and press contact. In the 1980s he was acting secretary-general twice; first after Trygve Bornø quit in 1985 and then after Svein Erik Haagenrud quit in 1988. He served as assistant secretary-general until his retirement in 1997.

In 1996 he was awarded the King's Medal of Merit. He died in February 2011.

Sporting positions
Preceded by Trygve Bornø	Secretary-general of the Football Association of Norway; 1985–1986 (acting)	Succeeded by Svein Erik Haagenrud
Preceded by Svein Erik Haagenrud	Secretary-general of the Football Association of Norway; February 1988 – September 1988 (acting)	Succeeded by Ivar Egeberg
