= Trygve Simonsen =

Norwegian politician

- Born: 3 September 1937
- Died: 18 April 2011 (aged 73)
- Occupation: Politician

Trygve Simonsen (3 September 1937 – 18 April 2011) was a Norwegian politician for the Progress Party and an engineer.

== Career ==
He served as a deputy representative to the Parliament of Norway from Troms during the term 1989–1993. In total he met during 55 days of parliamentary session. He was a member of Harstad city council following the 1987 Norwegian local elections, and was a member of Troms county council at the time of his death in 2011. In his working career, he was an engineer, and among others helped build the Tjeldsund Bridge.
