= Lilly Bølviken =

Norwegian judge and women's rights advocate

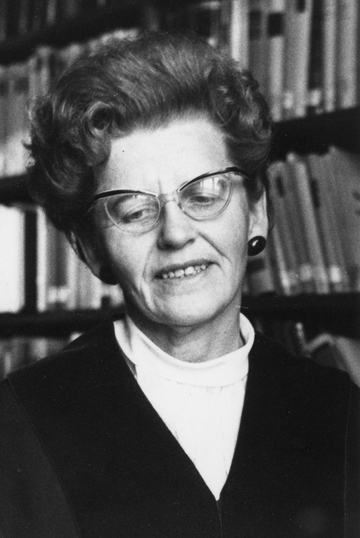
- Lilly Bølviken, 1971

Supreme Court Justice
- In office 1968–1984

Personal details
- Born: March 20, 1914
- Died: September 11, 2011 (aged 97)

Lilly Helena Bølviken (20 March 1914 – 11 September 2011) was a Norwegian judge and women's rights advocate. She became the first woman to be appointed as supreme court justice in Norway in 1968 and previously served as the only female judge on Oslo City Court from 1952. She was a long-time board member and first vice president of the Norwegian Association for Women's Rights.

== Career ==
She was born in Arendal. She worked as a judge in Oslo City Court from 1952, and was a Supreme Court Justice from 1968 to 1984. She was the first woman to serve in this position. Because of her work, she became a Commander of the Order of St. Olav. She died in 2011.

Bølviken was First Vice President of the Norwegian Association for Women's Rights 1960–1966 and a member of the executive board 1954–1966. She was also chairwoman of the supervisory council of Bredtveit Prison.
