= Odd Jarl Pedersen =

Norwegian judge

Odd Jarl Pedersen (7 December 1944 – 19 August 2011) was a Norwegian judge.

He hailed from Kristiansand. In his younger days he was a track and field athlete. He represented Kristiansands IF. After graduating with the cand.jur. degree he was a deputy judge in Nedre Romerike. He then worked at the University of Oslo, for the municipal attorney in Oslo and in Strømmen District Court. He then spent the rest of his career as a presiding judge in Eidsivating Court of Appeal. In 1998 he was an acting Supreme Court Justice. He published several books.

He died in August 2011.
