= Hans Christian Alsvik =

Norwegian television presenter

Hans Christian Alsvik (21 April 1936 – 1 October 2011) was a Norwegian television presenter.

He was born in Svolvær. He worked in Vestfold Arbeiderblad before being hired in the Norwegian Broadcasting Corporation (NRK) in 1966. He presented the program Ut i naturen (Out in nature), and was instrumental in building nature programs in the channel, often in cooperation with the BBC. He made over 3000 programs for NRK. He was also one of the creators of Norge rundt (Around Norway).

He received the King's Medal of Merit, and one Gullruten honorary award. He died in October 2011.
