= Einar Nistad =

Norwegian businessman (1932–2011)

Einar Sverre Nistad (1932–2011) was a Norwegian retailer.

In 1967 he created the shopping chain Mekka. The first store was located in Skostredet in Bergen. He expanded to four stores in 1975, and by 1992 Mekka had a market share of 25% in Bergen, Norway's second largest city. Mekka was sold to Hakon-Gruppen in 1993 for about 300 million kr (about US$53.5 million). For the revenue Nistad invested in several companies, and these investments were in 2006 grouped in the company Nistad Gruppen which was taken over by Einar Nistad's daughter Birgit. Einar Nistad died in 2011.
