= Henry Olaf Hoff =

Norwegian politician (1912–2011)

Henry Olaf Hoff (14 July 1912 – 25 June 2011) was a Norwegian welder, trade unionist and politician for the Communist and Labour parties.

== Early life and career ==
He was born in Aker. After attending vocational school in mechanics, which he finished in 1936, he was an apprentice at Norsk Gjærde- og Metalldukfabrikk from 1937 to 1941. While working here he also took extra education in the evenings. When finishing his training as a plate worker and welder in 1941, he was hired at Rodeløkken Maskinverksted. During the Second World War he was also active in the resistance, earning the Defence Medal 1940–1945, and in 1947 he attended a communist evening school.

== Political career and unionism ==
In politics, he started as leader of the local Young Communist League branch in Høybråten in 1947. In 1948 he advanced to regional leader in Oslo and Akershus; he was also a central board member of the organization until 1953, outliving the 1949 catharsis of Peder Furubotn and his supporters. From 1949 to 1951 he also served as the Young Communist League's national secretary.

He was elected to Oslo city council in 1951, and re-elected in 1955. He served as a deputy representative to the Parliament of Norway from Oslo during the term 1954–1957, and as it happened he had to meet in Parliament almost half of the time. In total he met during 2 years and 193 days of parliamentary session. From 1954 to 1965 he also served as the secretary of the Communist Party, also being elected for a new term as a deputy in Oslo city council from 1963 to 1967.

Hoff was hired as a welder at Nylands Verksted in 1951, and worked here until 1971 except for his tenure as party secretary in the Communist Party. From 1952 to 1954 he was the local trade union chairman at Nyland, and a supervisory council member of Oslo faglige samorg from 1953 to 1965. From 1968 to 1970 he headed the union again, and was also given a spot in the company's corporate council.

He ultimately left his job as a labourer to become a full-time trade unionist. He was elected as such in the Norwegian Union of Iron and Metalworkers in 1971, and from 1980 to 1981 he served as deputy leader of the union. He also announced a change in politics, as he in 1986 was selected for the supervisory council in Oslo Labour Party. He was one of their main contacts in the metal industry, and was a member of their party platform committee ahead of the 1991 Norwegian local elections. He resided near Valle-Hovin where he also involved himself when a party platform was to be laid out for the 1995 borough council elections.

Hoff was also a research consultant, as a member of trade subcommittees in NTNF and Norsk Produktivitetsinstitutt from 1978 to 1983 and the Fafo Foundation from 1982 to 1985. He was a prolific writer on workers' rights and trade issues. He died in June 2011.

Party political offices
Preceded by	Secretary of the Communist Party of Norway; 1954–1965	Succeeded by
