= Paul Grøstad =

Norwegian businessman

Paul M. Grøstad (21 September 1933 – 4 April 2011) was a Norwegian businessperson.

He took the cand.jur. degree, and worked in Norske Shell (Royal Dutch Shell in Norway) from 1960 to 1993. He is best known as the chairman of the company, from 1997 to 2003.

During his time in Norske Shell, he was involved in both building up and closing down the oil refinery in Sola Municipality. The company also became involved in the Ormen Lange gas field, eventually becoming the field operator. Grøstad also handled a boycott of Shell, which started because of alleged corporation with apartheid-era South Africa.

Business positions
Preceded by Egil Ellingsen	Chief executive officer of Norske Shell; 1997–2003	Succeeded by John Steinar Kvitvang
