= Erling Lægreid =

Norwegian journalist (1939–2011)

Erling Lægreid (5 September 1939 – 25 November 2011) was a Norwegian journalist and non-fiction writer. He was born in Årdalstangen. He was assigned to the Norwegian Broadcasting Corporation from 1970. He hosted several program series, including Flimra, Ungdommens Radioavis and Søndagsavisa. Among his books are Då Noreg gjekk av skaftet from 1993 and Nærgåande skisser from 2011.
