= Norwegian Athletics Association =

National track and field athletics governing body of Norway

- Sport: Athletics
- Abbreviation: NFIF
- Founded: 1 May 1896
- Affiliation: World Athletics
- Regional affiliation: EAA
- Headquarters: Oslo
- President: Runar Bålsrud

Official website
- www.friidrett.no
- (Norway)

The Norwegian Athletics Association (Norwegian: Norges Friidrettsforbund, NFIF) is the national governing body for the sport of athletics in Norway, including track and field, road running, cross country running and racewalking. The association is a member of the Norwegian Olympic and Paralympic Committee and Confederation of Sports, and a member of the International Association of Athletics Federations and European Athletics.

The association was founded on 1 May 1896 as Norsk Idrætsforbund. Until the formation of Norges Orienteringsforbund in 1945, NFIF also organized orienteering.
