= Confédération Interalliée des Sous-Officiers de Réserve =

Coordinates: 50°52′34.16″N 4°25′19.24″E

- Confédération Interalliée des Sous-Officiers de Réserve
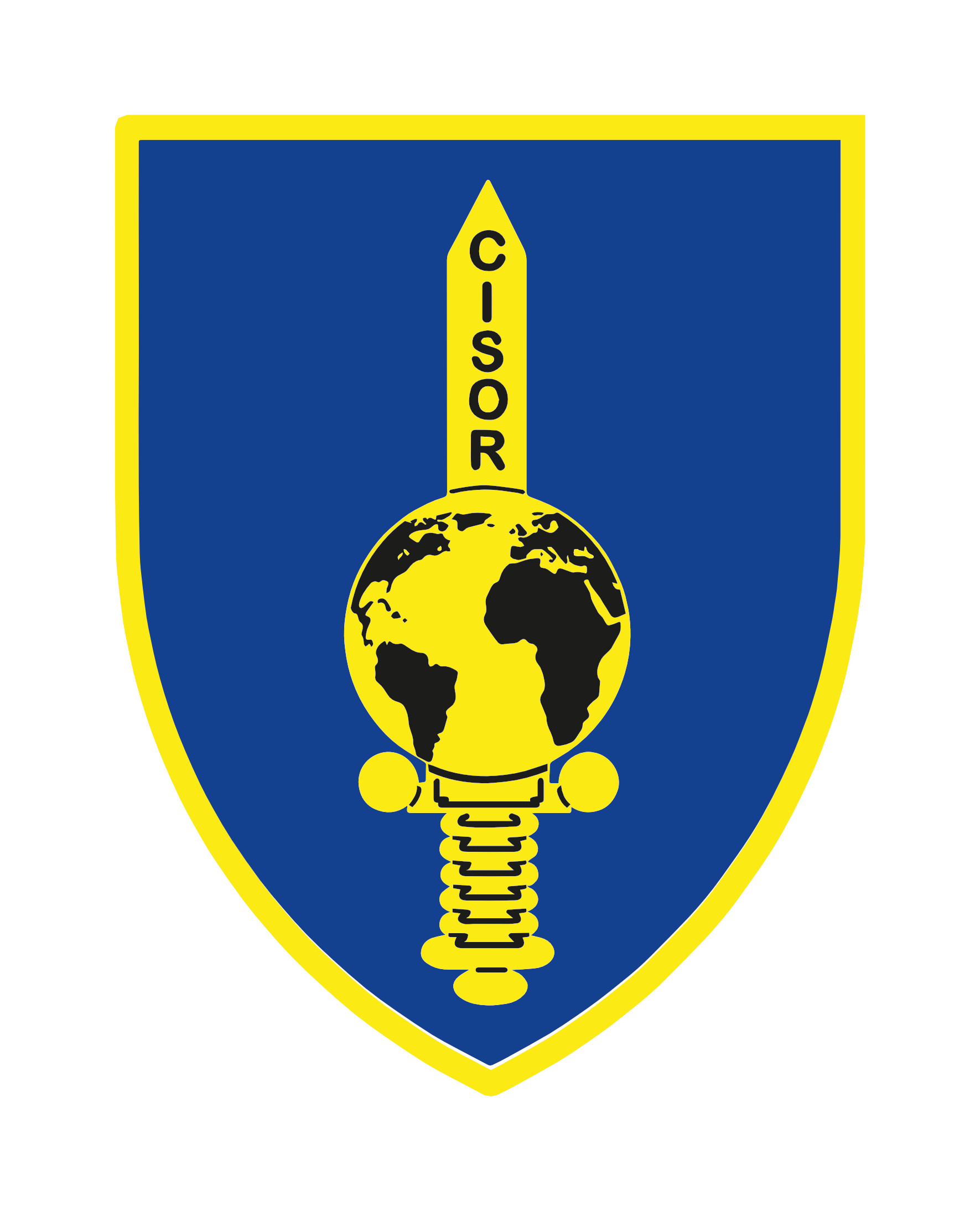
- Logo, created by Italy in 2013
- Abbreviation: CISOR
- Formation: 1 June 1963
- Type: Military Alliance
- Headquarters: Helsinki, Finland
- Members: 19 states: Austria; Belgium; Canada; Denmark; France; Germany; Italy; Luxembourg; Switzerland; Netherlands; Poland; Slovenia; Spain; Finland; (United Kingdom) Great Britain; Hungary; Romania; Ukraine; Observer Nations: Portugal (2006)
- Official language: English
- President CISOR: Minna Nenonen (Finland)
- Website: www.cisor.org

The Confédération Interalliée des Sous-Officiers de Réserve (CISOR), until 2013 also known as Association Européenne des Sous-Officiers de Réserve (AESOR), is the parent organisation of the national European NCO Reserve Corps within the NATO and also international. Currently CISOR consists of 19 countries under the presidential lead of Finland. This non-profit organisation was founded on 1 June 1963.

== History ==
Before World War II, there were already various connections between the reserve officer corps of Belgium, France and the Netherlands, which started working together again in 1946, after the war. Those connections led to the first Congress event and the formal establishment of the „Interallied Confederation of Reserve Officers" (CIOR), on November 20, 1948 in Brussels. Step-by-step the countries of Luxembourg (1952), Denmark (1956), Greece (1956), United States (1958), Italy (1960), Germany (1961), Great Britain (1963), Canada (1964), Norway (1966) and Spain (1992) also joined CIOR.

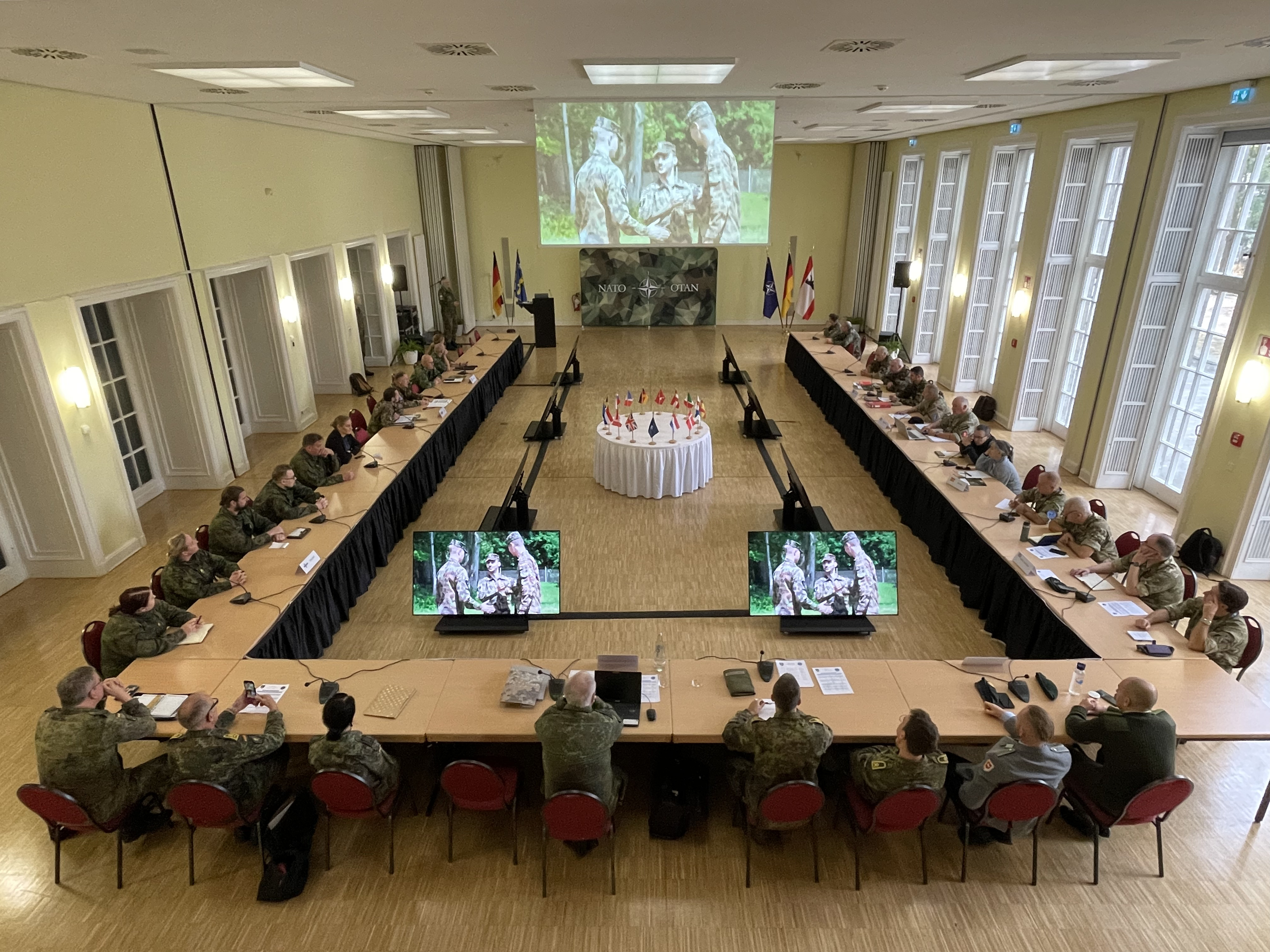
CISOR Central Committee Meeting, on October 31, 2024 in Berlin

CISOR was founded as Association Européenne des Sous-Officiers de Réserve (AESOR). That happened at the French Navy base of Toulon on 1 June 1963 and was following an initiative of the Fédération Nationale des Associations des Sous-Officiers de Réserve (FNASOR). The ratification of the different charters was made by the representatives of the NCO Corps of Belgium, Luxembourg, Germany, Switzerland and France.

The presidents of AESOR and CISOR from 1963 until present
Nr.	Name	Land	Begin of the period	End of the period
1	Sergeant Abbé Henri Pistre (1900–1981)	France	1963	1965
2	Adjudant Henri Leclercq	Belgium	1966	1968
3	Oberbootsmann d.R. Siegfried Hermann	Germany	1968	1969
4	AD Uof Emile Fillettez	Switzerland	1970	1971
5	Général Marcel Buffin	France	1972	1973
6	Vizeleutnant Johann Hechenberger	Austria	1974	1975
7	Adjudant Pierre van Hove	Belgium	1976	1977
8	Oberfeldwebel Werner Frank	Germany	1978	1979
9	Adj Uof Viktor Bulgheroni	Switzerland	1980	1981
10	Vizeleutnant Hermann Loidold	Austria	1982	1982
11	Vizeleutnant Herbert Simmer	Austria	1983	1983
12	Sergeant-chef Charles de Giafferi	France	1984	1985
13	Adjudant Edward Majois	Belgium	1986	1987
14	Hauptfeldwebel Klaus Günnewig	Germany	1988	1989
15	Adj Uof Robert Nussbaumer	Switzerland	1990	1991
16	Maresc Gerardo Di Lorenzo	Italy	1992	1993
17	Vizeleutnant Josef Grünstäudl	Austria	1994	1995
18	Adjudant Dimitri Pezirianoglou	France	1996	1997
19	Adjudant Nico C. Frerichs	Netherlands	1998	1999
20	Adjudant André Vallée	Belgium	2000	2001
21	Hauptbootsmann Michael Warfolomeow	Germany	2002	2003
22	Adj Uof Alfons Cadario (1940–2016)	Switzerland	2004	2005
23	Vizeleutnant Franz Hitzl	Austria	2006	2007
24	Arturo Malagutti	Italy	2008	2010
25	Luis Messeguer	Spain	2010	2011
26	Sgt. Miguel Núñez	Spain	2012	2012
27	Maître Principal Philippe Cogan	France	2012	2014
28	Tomaž Lavtižar	Slovenia	2014	2016
29	Ilpo Pohjola	Finland	2016	2018
30	Michel d'Alessandro	Belgium	2018	2020
31	Germain Beucler	Switzerland	2020	2022
32	CSM Reinhard Knott	Germany	2022	2024
33	SGM Minna Nenonen	Finland	2024	

== Directives ==
The current statute establishes that, together with civil and military authorities, European and national, CISOR contributes to the creation of a European defense system to safeguard freedom in Europe. These are the purposes:

a) To participate to the creation of an international common Reservists Statute, for all EU and non EU countries.
b) To boost the military improvement, theoretical and practical, of all members, in order to develop a constant defense and security spirit.

== See also ==
- Military pentathlon
- Interallied Confederation of Reserve Officers (CIOR)

== Bibliography ==
- Reserveunteroffiziere stellen sich international neu auf. loyal 05/13, p. 48
- AESOR Wettkämpfe in Toledo und Warschau. Informationsdienst für Reservisten & Reservistinnen, edited by Führungsstab der Streitkräfte, I/2012, p. 9
