= CIOR =

CIOR may refer to:

- Interallied Confederation of Reserve Officers,
- CIOR (AM), a radio transmitter in Princeton, British Columbia.
