= Finance Credit =

Norwegian financial company

Finance Credit Norge AS
- Type: Private
- Industry: Debt collection, Financial services
- Founded: 1995
- Founder: Torgeir Stensrud; Trond Kristoffersen
- Defunct: 2002
- Fate: Bankruptcy following the discovery of a NOK 1.4 billion fraud scandal
- Headquarters: Lysaker, Bærum, Norway
- Area served: Nordic Region
- Services: Debt collection; Factoring; Purchase of overdue claims
- Net income: NOK 71 million (2001, reported figure, later proven to be falsified)
- Number of employees: Approximately 400 (2002)
- Parent: Finance Credit Group

Finance Credit was a Norwegian company that went bankrupt in 2002, after facing criminal investigation for siphoning funds (in total 1.4 billion NOK) it borrowed from seven Norwegian banks to offshore tax havens. What became known as the Finance Credit scandal in Norwegian media is the biggest economic fraud in the history of Norway.

The company was founded as Finance Credit Ltd in London in 1995 by Torgeir Stensrud and Trond Kristoffersen. The case involved a complex array of legal entities, including Finance Credit Group AS, Finance Credit AS and Finance Credit Norge ASA.

In October 2004 Kristoffersen was convicted of fraud and sentenced to nine years in prison and to pay NOK 1,178 million in compensation to the defrauded banks. In October 2005 Stensrud received the same conviction and was sentenced to seven years in prison and to pay NOK 1,128 million in compensation.

== Background ==
Before Finance Credit, Stensrud had built up the debt collection company Forretningsforum, which became Norway's largest collection agency before it was taken over by Intrum Justitia in the late 1980s. He was also active in reserve-officer organisations, serving as president of the Interallied Confederation of Reserve Officers from 1990 to 1992. A later clothing venture, Display Textiles AS, went bankrupt amid reports of incomplete bookkeeping, and Stensrud had earlier received a suspended sentence for an attempted fraud involving a false bank guarantee.

Kristoffersen, from Hammerfest, owned the Oslo factoring and collection company Inter Factor AS. In 1992 Dagens Næringsliv reported that it was under police investigation over its handling of client funds, and clients repeatedly complained of late or missing settlements. In 1995 Kristoffersen received a two-year bankruptcy disqualification in connection with the bankruptcy of another of his companies, Norsk Jernvare Import. Around 1996/97 the sister company Inter Kreditt lost its collection licence, and the business continued under the Finance Credit name.

The two men went into partnership in 1995 and set up Finance Credit Ltd in London that April. The Norwegian operation, Finance Credit Norge, also administered a series of founder-owned special-purpose companies named Faktura Finans. The business model was to buy clients' invoices shortly after they fell due at around 97 per cent of face value, collect the full amount, and cover the risk through credit insurance.

== Growth and financing ==
From 1997 the company borrowed from Nordlandsbanken, whose Oslo board included Finance Credit's chairman, and from Sparebanken Nor. The investor Erling Borg became a 25 per cent shareholder, and a NOK 30 million injection from him earned the company a top credit rating from Dun & Bradstreet. After KPMG became auditor in 1999, the founders expanded into the other Nordic countries and lending grew sharply. Nordlandsbanken, Sparebanken Nor and Vår Bank (later Bank 1 Oslo) lent hundreds of millions of kroner, partly to thinly capitalised founder-owned companies, on the understanding that the purchased receivables were fully covered by credit insurance.

Borg fell out with the founders in 2000 over large transfers to their privately owned companies, and his stake was bought out for NOK 125 million, financed by further bank loans. In November 2000 Bank 1 Oslo arranged a NOK 450 million syndicated loan with three other Sparebank 1 banks, later raised to NOK 575 million. Further loans followed from Privatbanken, Sparebanken Øst and others. By 2002 the group claimed about 400 employees and 1,400 clients in five countries, and banks had lent it about NOK 1.4 billion over five years.

In 2000–2001 the founders' holding company Finance Credit Group bought five companies, mainly owned by the founders themselves, for NOK 640 million, a price backed by a consultancy valuation. Some of these companies had in fact been financed by Finance Credit Norge, and that the deal left the group owing each founder more than NOK 200 million. By the end, the group was a web of Norwegian, Nordic and British operating companies held through family trusts, a Netherlands Antilles company and the Dutch company Windroos BV.

== International operations ==
Finance Credit Ltd in the United Kingdom lost about £4.5 million on the contractor Stodgell Ltd, and its other main client, North West Heating & Plumbing, went into administration in 2002 owing about £9.2 million. Nordlandsbanken lent about NOK 220 million for the British operation without obtaining a debenture over the British companies. Subsidiaries were founded in Denmark and Finland in 1999; the Finnish company's first large purchase, Libyan state receivables, never yielded any money. In Sweden the founders set up eCredit AB and planned a Stockholm stock exchange listing for late 2002.

== Accounting irregularities ==
Finance Credit's reported profits relied largely on income from companies controlled by the founders, and on gains booked when receivables were bought rather than when they were collected.

- 1997–1998: Revenue booked from Faktura Finans companies with no income of their own turned a loss into a reported profit. The 1998 accounts included income from an agreement to buy the customer ledger of Storm Elektro, which Storm Elektro's finance director said he had never signed.
- 1999–2000: Large purchases of receivables were taken to income immediately, and nearly NOK 150 million was transferred to foreign subsidiaries in the last quarter of 1999. Of the NOK 50.2 million group pre-tax result for 2000, much came from related-party sales, fees and interest, and the parent's NOK 411 million in "customer receivables" were in reality claims on the founders' own companies.
- Royal Consulting: A balance of about NOK 38 million owed by this telemarketing client was reported to the banks as largely repaid in 2001. Jahr states the repayments were funded by a same-day bank loan to Stensrud's investment company, and that the real loss of about NOK 63 million was moved into a Faktura Finans company.

Further warnings came from auditors in Denmark over a shortfall in client funds, and from the Finnish subsidiary, which reported fraud losses not covered by its credit insurance.

== Media scrutiny ==
Early coverage was positive; in 1999 Finansavisen called the company a "money machine". From 2000 The Mail on Sunday and TV 2 Hjelper deg criticised the sales methods of Royal Consulting, whose receivables Finance Credit had bought.

From 2001 the journalist Bjørn Olav Jahr of the business magazine Kapital published a series of critical articles, including "Når sprekker Finance Credit-boblen?" ("When will the Finance Credit bubble burst?") in October 2001, questioning the company's reported profits, its receivables and the absence of loan-loss provisions. The company rejected the articles, hired media advisers and considered legal action. Jahr's reporting won the SKUP prize for investigative journalism for 2002; the jury noted that for about a year he had been alone in asking critical questions. In November 2002 Dagbladet wrote that Kapital had warned about the company more than a year earlier. Jahr's first book on the case was published in 2005.

== Collapse ==
As liquidity tightened in 2002, the founders sought new lenders and investors, using a list of receivables that Jahr describes as misleading. A planned bid for the payment card company Europay ended when SEB won the auction. In the autumn an intra-group claim of NOK 613 million was reinstated to strengthen the balance sheet, using back-dated minutes. In October Landesbank Kiel declared Faktura Finans III in default, client remittances fell badly behind, and Kredittilsynet questioned unlicensed collection activity.

The syndicate banks engaged Ernst & Young, which contacted clients directly and found that only 18 per cent of a sample of invoices could be confirmed as stated. On 13 November 2002 KPMG UK resigned as auditor of Finance Credit Ltd, and two days later KPMG's Norwegian auditors withdrew. On 16 November 2002 Stensrud and Kristoffersen were arrested by Økokrim during a meeting with the banks' lawyers in Oslo.

The company was declared bankrupt. Jahr estimates the combined losses of the bankruptcy estates at about NOK 1.2 billion, none of which Økokrim had traced. Clients lost several tens of millions of kroner more, and Nordlandsbanken lost its independence.

Approximate exposures by lender at the time of the collapse
Lender	NOK million	Ref
Sparebank 1 Gruppen banks (Bank 1 Oslo, Sparebanken Midt-Norge, Sparebanken Vest, SR-Bank)	700	
Nordlandsbanken	about 500	
Sparebanken Øst	100	
Privatbanken	100	
Landesbank Kiel	about 84	
Anthon B. Nielsen	50	

=== Trials and criticism ===
Kristoffersen was sentenced to nine years' imprisonment on 19 October 2004, and Stensrud to seven years in 2005. Jahr argues that the convictions did not explain how the founders could borrow so much, often without written agreements, and criticises Økokrim for not examining the role of the lending banks or the clients' losses.

== Founders ==
=== Trond Kristoffersen ===
Trond Kristoffersen (13 August 1956 – August 2013) was born in Hammerfest. In addition to his prison and compensation sentences, he was barred from engaging in independent trade and from holding senior or board positions in companies. He was imprisoned in Ullersmo prison from 2007, after the Supreme Court rejected his appeal. After six years he was released after lodging an appeal, and he died in August 2013.

=== Torgeir Stensrud ===
Torgeir Stensrud (1 July 1949 – 27 September 2015) was chairman of Finance Credit, a former leader of the Interallied Confederation of Reserve Officers, and a military officer. In 2014 he managed "the Way Back", a project in which former inmates used road cycling to help rebuild their lives. He died in 2015.

== Bibliography ==
- Jahr, Bjørn Olav (2005). Smarte skurker – grådige gubber: historien om Finance Credit (in Norwegian). Oslo: Bojahr Media. ISBN 82-997155-0-4.
