= Nordlandsbanken =

Norwegian bank

Nordlandsbanken ASA
- Type: Subsidiary
- Industry: Banking
- Founded: 1893
- Defunct: October 1, 2012
- Headquarters: Bodø, Norway
- Area served: Nordland, Norway
- Key people: Morten Støver (CEO)
- Number of employees: 280 (2006)
- Parent: DnB NOR
- Website: www.nordlandsbanken.no

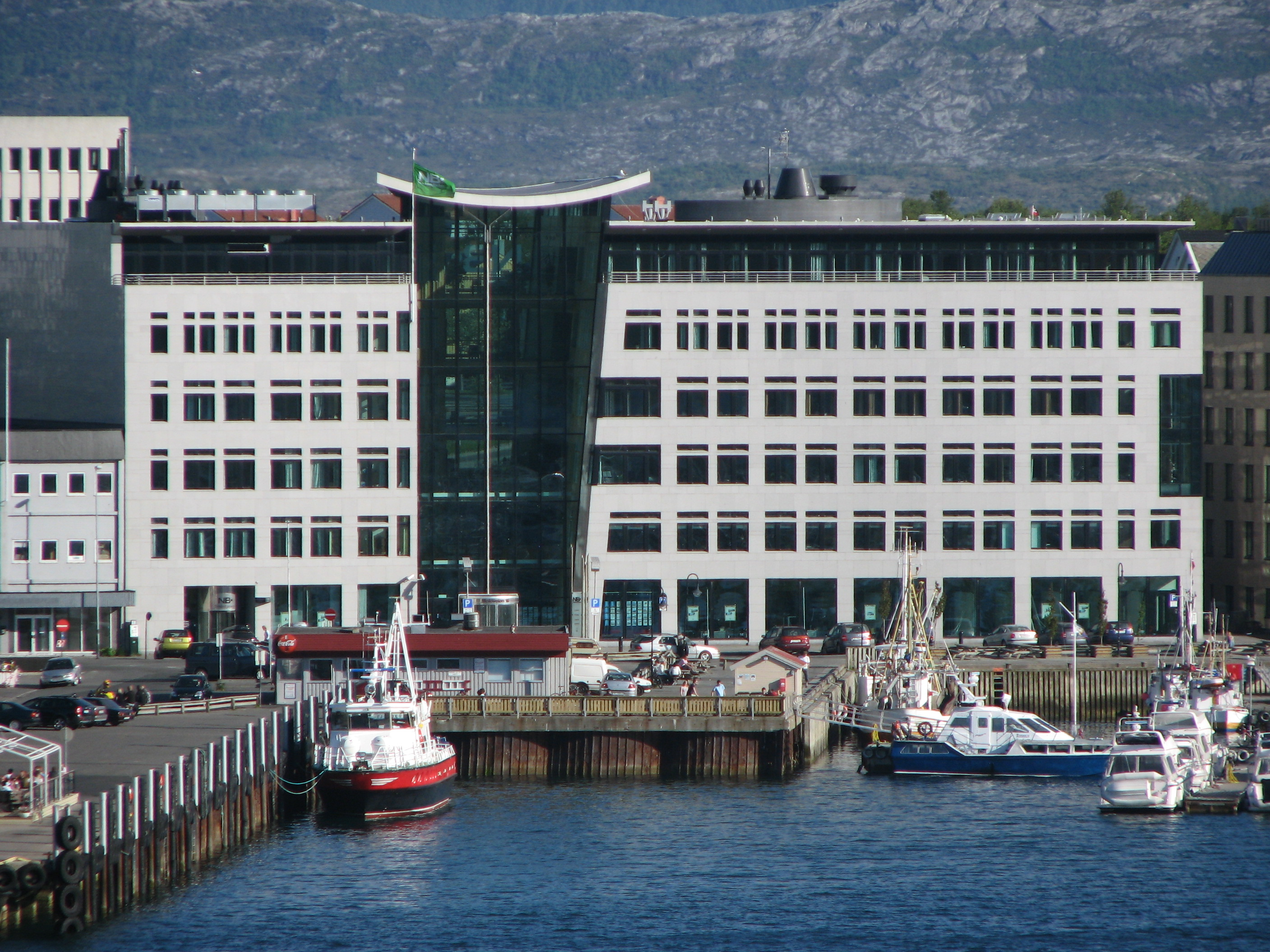
Head office of Nordlandsbanken in Bodø

Nordlandsbanken was a Norwegian bank serving the County of Nordland. Nordlandsbanken was at the end a wholly owned subsidiary of DnB NOR who bought the bank in 2003. It had total assets of NOK 22 billion and headquarters in Bodø. The bank had 17 branches.

== History ==
Nordlands Privatbank was established on 1 July 1893, as the first commercial bank in Northern Norway. The bank expanded with a cooperations with other banks established Ofotens Bank in Narvik in 1899. Later branches were established in Svolvær (1910) and Sortland (1918). The boom and bust during World War I and the following economic crisis struck the bank hard, and in 1923 the bank was put under public administration, and reemerged as a new bank in 1928. After 1945, the Government lay pressure on small banks to merge.

Nordlandsbanken was created as a merger between Fauske Bank, Søndre Helgelands Kreditbank, Helgelands Fiskeri- og Handelsbank and Nordlands Privatbank. Until DnB NOR bought the bank in 2003, it was listed on the Oslo Stock Exchange. After the takeover, all of Nordlandsbanken's operations outside Nordland, in Oslo and Tromsø, were taken over by DnB NOR, though DnB NOR retained its branch in Bodø. Part of the reason DnB NOR bought Nordlandsbanken was the economic crisis Nordlandsbanken found itself in, having lost NOK 450 million to the Finance Credit-system.
