= Interallied Confederation of Reserve Officers =

- Formation: 1948; 78 years ago
- Headquarters: Brussels, Belgium
- Members: ~1.3 million
- President: LtCol Lars Bak
- Website: cior.net

The Interallied Confederation of Reserve Officers, commonly known by its French acronym CIOR (Confédération Interalliée des Officiers de Réserve), is an organization comprising reserve officers' associations from NATO member states and partner nations.

Founded in 1948, CIOR currently comprises 34 participating countries and represents over one million reservists. It is the world's largest organization of military reserve officers.

CIOR is officially sanctioned and recognized by NATO through MC 0248/2 to assist and advise on reserve affairs. However, it remains politically independent. The confederation facilitates advanced training programs, international seminars, and working meetings for reserve officers.

Before the Second World War, reserve officers' associations from Belgium, France, and the Netherlands maintained contact. These connections were reestablished in 1946 following the war. On 20 November 1948, these efforts culminated in the first congress and the formal founding of the Confédération Interalliée des Officiers de Réserve (CIOR).

Over time, additional countries joined CIOR, including Luxembourg (1952), Denmark (1956), Greece (1956), the United States (1958), Italy (1960), Germany (1961), the United Kingdom (1963), Canada (1964), Norway (1966), Spain (1992), and Estonia (1999).

== Mission of CIOR ==
The Interallied Confederation of Reserve Officers (CIOR) aims to strengthen ties between reservists and NATO military authorities, promote cooperation among reserve officers from member nations, and advocate for equitable duties, rights, training, and mobilization obligations for reservists while respecting national traditions and differences.

CIOR convenes at least twice a year, in summer and winter, to address key issues through specialized committees that analyze matters related to reserve forces. Topics of interest typically include the role of reserve forces in international operations, the reintegration of reservists into their communities after deployment, the law of armed conflict, the impact of NATO expansion on reserve forces, and employer support for reservists.

Delegation members contribute to CIOR committees both before and during congresses, providing content and technical expertise from their respective national delegations. CIOR committees include Defense Attitudes and Security Issues (DEFSEC), Civil-Military Cooperation (CIMIC), Strategic Communication (STRATCOM), Military Competitions (MILCOMP), Legal, Outreach, Seminar, and the Young Reserve Officers Committee (YROC).

Additionally, the CIOR Language Academy (CLA) promotes language training in NATO's official languages, English and French, while the Winter Seminar organizes and conducts discussions on contemporary defense and security policy issues.

== Roles of CIOR ==
The Interallied Confederation of Reserve Officers (CIOR) serves as the advocate and voice for reserve forces within the NATO Alliance, regularly providing strategic advice to the Chairman of the NATO Military Committee on reserve-related issues. It also supports the professional development of reserve officers.

As a key advisor to NATO, CIOR offers guidance on the optimal use of reserve forces across various operational settings and works to harmonize the roles, duties, and rights of reservists among Allied nations. Additionally, CIOR contributes to NATO's objectives by fostering cooperation and interoperability among reserve forces within the Alliance and its partner nations.

The relationship between CIOR and NATO is formally defined in NATO Military Committee Document MC 248/2.

== CIOR contribution to NATO ==
The Interallied Confederation of Reserve Officers (CIOR) supports NATO's outreach initiatives, promoting peace through dialogue and facilitating the expansion of NATO membership. Active participation in CIOR strengthens a nation's commitment to the NATO Alliance, enhancing its reputation among Allied nations.

== Structure of CIOR ==
=== Defense Attitudes and Security Issues Committee (DEFSEC) ===
The DEFSEC Committee functions as a think tank, addressing current global security issues. Its focus includes topics such as the role of reserves in international operations, homeland defense, employer support, mobilization, peacekeeping, and reserve recruitment. The committee's research efforts involve collecting, analyzing, and disseminating information for NATO, ministries of defense, and other political decision-makers. Committee membership adds value to NATO, member nations, and individual members by facilitating knowledge transfer, exchanging ideas and policy initiatives, and benchmarking methodologies.

The DEFSEC Committee aims to study defense and security issues in a relevant and results-oriented manner, contributing to policy development at the level of NATO's Military Committee. Future initiatives will focus on exploring innovative ways for the reserve community to form strategic partnerships with evolving stakeholders in the corporate and academic sectors, while continuing to strengthen relationships with NATO and its respective Ministries of Defense.

=== Civil Military Cooperation Committee (CIMIC) ===
The CIMIC Committee leverages the military and civilian expertise of reserve officers. It focuses on humanitarian aid missions, support for civil authorities and communities, and serves as CIOR's liaison to the Confederation of Interallied Medical Reserve Officers (CIOMR). The committee provides advice and analysis to the CIOR President on CIMIC issues that impact the Alliance.

Additionally, the committee assists in planning and executing a tabletop exercise (CIMEX) during the Summer Congress.

=== Strategic Communication Committee (STRATCOM) ===
The CIOR STRATCOM Committee is responsible for:

- Effectively promoting awareness, understanding, and the relevance of CIOR to internal and external stakeholders and audiences
- Supporting and assisting in the achievement of CIOR's strategic objectives
- Promoting public awareness and understanding of reserve forces
- Promoting public awareness and understanding of NATO
- Exchanging STRATCOM lessons learned and best practices

The STRATCOM Committee works to promote CIOR to its stakeholders and strategic target audiences. It provides direct public affairs support for the Military Skills Competition, Winter Seminar, Summer Symposium, CIOR Language Academy, and Summer Congresses. Additionally, the committee collects information from various CIOR working bodies to maintain an overview of CIOR activities.

The STRATCOM Committee directly coordinates its work and output with the Presidency’s Public Affairs staff and the host nation’s Public Affairs staff for CIOR events. The committee conducts outreach to NATO and the NFRC. It markets and provides professional public affairs products to NATO, NFRC, and the ministries of defense and reserve associations of member nations through their websites and publications. Additionally, the committee maintains media databases for the Reserve Officers Association.

The STRATCOM Committee is composed of officers with expertise in areas such as journalism, broadcast media, public affairs, public relations, communications, and marketing.

Benefits of serving on the STRATCOM Committee include:

- The opportunity to work in an international setting alongside NATO allies, allowing members to learn about different cultures and gain experience in communicating with a diverse group of people focused on a common goal.
- The chance to sharpen skills in writing, editing, and media relations. The majority of the work involves writing articles, taking photos, and publishing CIOR materials. In some cases, committee members may also be tasked with media relations duties.
- The opportunity to develop skills in strategic planning, time management, and public speaking, while continuing to refine their journalistic writing abilities.

=== Military Competition (MILCOMP) - Program and Committee ===
The MILCOMP is an integral part of the annual Summer Congress, designed to test the military skills of reservists in areas such as marksmanship, military navigation, land and water obstacle courses, hand grenade throwing, map reading, first aid, and the application of the Law of Armed Conflict. More than 180 reserve officers from CIOR and guest nations compete in this major event, typically held at a military installation. The competition is open to all ranks, male or female.

The MILCOMP Committee works with the host nation of the Summer Congress to ensure the event is conducted in accordance with internationally recognized competition regulations.

=== Legal Committee ===
The Legal Committee serves as the legal "think tank" of CIOR, composed of reserve officers with legal qualifications or experience. The committee includes lawyers from various branches of the legal field, such as judges, attorneys, prosecutors, and university professors. All members share a common military background as reservists from their respective nations. As a result, the Legal Committee represents a unique international body of legal expertise, covering a wide range of legal aspects.

The Legal Committee is the legal advisory body of CIOR, providing support to the Presidency, Council, committees, and working groups of both CIOR and CIOMR. Its focus areas include:

- Issues related to the Law of Armed Conflict
- Employee and employer protection
- Support for employers, families, and reservists
- Mobilization and demobilization
- Legal education and development of international and military law
- The Constitution and Bylaws of CIOR
- Support for prospective new member associations

The Legal Committee supports the MILCOMP Law of Armed Conflict (LOAC) competition, which aims to train and educate military personnel in the application and observation of the legal rules of war (e.g., protection of prisoners, Geneva Convention, etc.) within a realistic scenario. The competition is synchronized with the First Aid Contest (FAC) organized by CIOMR and is held annually during the CIOR Summer Congress. Additionally, the committee administers a LOAC test to the Young Reserve Officers (YROs) to assess and validate their knowledge of LOAC.

=== Outreach Committee ===
The Outreach Committee (formerly the Partnership for Peace Committee) establishes links with Partnership for Peace (PfP) member countries, including nations seeking entry into NATO. Since the inception of the PfP program, the committee has supported the creation of new Reserve Officers' Associations (ROAs) and reserve officer organizations in PfP countries. Since 1994, the committee has successfully facilitated the integration of ROAs from former Warsaw Pact countries into CIOR and helped selected nations become full members of both NATO and CIOR. The PfP program continues to integrate former neutral countries in Europe, the Balkans, Eastern Europe, and other regions.

NATO's role has expanded beyond the borders of Europe, becoming increasingly crucial in the current global geopolitical climate. National Reserve Forces play a consistent, dependable, and vital role in executing many of NATO's new missions.

The Outreach Committee serves as CIOR's outreach arm, acting on behalf of the organization to establish initial contact with Reserve Associations in non-participating nations. It provides a forum for prospective new affiliates to engage and participate. Membership in the Outreach Committee helps develop diplomatic and leadership skills and offers the opportunity to work in multicultural, multilingual environments.

=== CIOR Language Academy (CLA) ===
The primary mission of the Language Academy is to teach English and French as foreign languages (EFL/FFL), with reservists instructing reservists from NATO member nations, new member and partner nations from Eastern and Central Europe, and Mediterranean Dialogue countries. The academy offers intensive courses in EFL and FFL at three proficiency levels, focusing on the development of listening comprehension and pronunciation skills.

The courses incorporate conversation practice through topical discussions in a military context. Learning objectives include:

- Expanding the student's ability to interact intelligibly in a military context
- Enhancing the student's ability to interact in social situations
- Ensuring the student is understood by native speakers with minimal disruption in speech delivery
- Improving the student's ability to understand spoken language in a military context
- Participating in group discussions with increased fluency and minimal hesitation
- Comprehending short class lectures
- Understanding the gist of conversational English and French
- Expanding vocabulary in both written and spoken forms
- Improving skills and confidence in speaking and listening in English and French.

As a secondary mission, the Language Academy teaches cultural and military history to supplement its language program. The culture and history of the host nation are typically presented by a guest lecturer from the host nation. Portions of the curriculum also address the background of CIOR, the philosophy of NATO and PfP, as well as United Nations peacekeeping.

The academy convenes once annually for a two-week period.

=== Seminar Committee ===
The Winter Seminar Committee plans and organizes CIOR's Winter Seminar, which was initiated in 1990 to address current and vital defense and security issues. Participation in the seminar significantly contributes to officers' professional development by providing unique and challenging exposure to topical issues. Selected delegates from all CIOR nations attend the seminar, which is scheduled immediately before or after the Mid-Winter Meeting (MWM). It is conducted with the support of local institutions, typically at a conference center in Bonn, Germany. Each CIOR participating nation is allocated several vacancies for the event, with the total number of seats typically around sixty-five (65).

Seminar themes vary each year, depending on the international affairs issues that are vital to NATO, its member nations, and PfP nations. Under the provisions of the CIOR Constitution and Bylaws, the intent is to analyze current defense, political, and security issues through presentations by experts from diverse backgrounds, including military officers, diplomats, and academics from various countries. These presentations and panels take place over a period of three days and cover political, social, economic, cultural, and military issues.

=== Workshop/Seminar Program ===
The Young Reserve Officers’ program aims to provide junior officers with an international forum to both inform and engage in debate. A workshop is held each summer during the CIOR Summer Congress, featuring professional and social events where junior officers interact with each other and with senior officers from CIOR participating nations, including Reserve Senior Leadership participating in NATO's National Reserve Forces Committee. Once or twice a year, Seminars—a smaller, more intimate version of the workshop—are organized regionally to offer nations a lower-cost, introductory venue for their young officers.

The program curriculum includes selected briefings from SHAPE, NATO, the NATO School, Non-Governmental Organizations (NGOs), the European Union (EU), and internationally recognized subject matter experts. Additionally, the workshop includes a practical exercise and the presentation of a formal paper on a relevant theme, based on issues of importance to NATO.

YRO delegates are placed into multinational syndicates, allowing for free-flowing discussions that enable participants to develop close working relationships and gain an understanding of different national perspectives.

=== Delegates-at-Large (DAL) Program ===
Delegates-at-Large (DALs) attend CIOR/CIOMR functions to support the activities of CIOR and CIOMR, as well as the Atlantic Alliance. DALs stay engaged and informed on current affairs while maintaining their friendships and sharing camaraderie with other international officers.

Serving and retired Reserve officers and their family members, as well as the family members of official delegates, may be authorized by their respective national associations to attend the Summer Congress as Delegates-at-Large (DALs). There is no cost to the Reserve Associations for their attendance, as DALs cover their own travel expenses and registration fees. At their discretion, they may attend certain professional development sessions and participate in the CIOR/CIOMR-organized cultural trips.

Special briefings are held for Delegates-at-Large (DALs) on key defense issues, as well as on CIOR and NATO topics. DAL participation helps create an informed constituency that can more effectively influence opinions on reserve matters in their respective countries.

== Activities ==
=== Professional development ===
CIOR is an organization committed to professional development, offering a variety of high-caliber and cost-effective programs that benefit individual reservists, their member nations, and NATO as a whole. By raising awareness of contemporary reserve issues and promoting interoperability and cooperation while respecting national traditions, CIOR develops individual reservists to serve both national and international interests.

Some key professional development opportunities uniquely available through CIOR include the following:

=== Military competition ===
Over 250 athletes participate in CIOR's military competition each year. Established in 1957, it is an internationally recognized competition focused on military skills that challenge the leadership and physical robustness of reservists from across NATO and its partners. The competition is highly relevant to deployed operations, as it trains and tests essential warrior skills that officers must master for success on the current battlefield, including physical fitness, teamwork, land navigation, marksmanship, combat first aid, and the Law of Armed Conflict.

=== Young Reserve Officers Workshop ===
The Young Reserve Officers Workshop is an annual week-long workshop for about 60 reserve officers, focusing on current defense and security issues related to reserve force matters within NATO and its partners. The workshop is designed to provide young officers with their first international exposure to colleagues from the alliance and its partners.

=== CIOR Language Academy ===
The CIOR Language Academy teaches English and French as second languages, with an emphasis on a NATO military lexicon. The students are reserve officers from NATO member nations, as well as new member and partner nations from Eastern and Central Europe and the Mediterranean Dialogue countries. Established in 2000, the Language Academy continues to grow each year, training up to 100 students annually from nearly every nation in Eastern and Central Europe.

=== Winter Seminar ===
A Seminar is held for three days immediately preceding the MWM. Each CIOR member country is allocated several seats for this event, with the total number of seats approximating 65. Seminar themes vary each year, depending on the state of international affairs. The intent is to provide up-to-date information on the chosen theme through a series of briefings and presentations by military officers, diplomats, and academics from various countries. These presentations and panels cover political, social, economic, cultural, and military issues. The Seminar Committee is the subject of a separate fact sheet.

=== CIMIC Exercise ===
The CIMIC Committee hosts an annual table-top Civil-Military Exercise (CIMEX) prior to the CIOR Summer Congress each year. In 2018, CIMEX was incorporated into the NATO Military & Training Education Program (MTEP). During CIMEX 2020, there was another first for CIOR, as the exercise was conducted both online and physically. The overriding principles of CIMEX are: demonstrating civil-military liaison skills, fostering collaboration and information-sharing on emerging NATO challenges, and promoting best practices and professional development within the CIMIC community. The exercise is tailored for approximately 50 participants each year.

=== CIOR/CIOMR Mid-Winter Meeting (MWM) ===
The Mid-Winter Meeting (MWM) is usually held in February at NATO Headquarters. The meeting begins with presentations by the CIOR/CIOMR International Presidencies, outlining their organizations’ updated priorities, tasks, and plans, as well as any additional information related to the meeting agenda. Presentations are typically delivered by officials from NATO and SHAPE (Supreme Headquarters Allied Powers Europe), as well as from the Chair of NATO's NRFC (National Reserve Forces Committee). These presentations provide guidance to delegates and information on the current state of affairs of these organizations and their implications for the Alliance.

During the meeting, the CIOR Committees and CIOMR convene to work on tasks assigned by the Presidency and the Council. At the end of the week, a closing formal dinner is held on the final evening. These activities offer networking opportunities for all delegates. The MWM concludes with a final general session to review the work accomplished and to plan for the future.

=== The CIOR/CIOMR Summer Congress ===
A CIOR affiliate hosts this event in their nation on a rotating basis, usually in July or August. A one-and-a-half-day symposium on reserve issues is held during the Congress, focusing on topical issues relevant to reservists from all nations. The Symposium attracts speakers at the highest political, military, and academic levels. These speakers address issues such as mobilization and reserve readiness, demobilization, repatriation of reservists to their home countries and civilian jobs, and the appropriate utilization of civilian specialists for peace support operations. The professional development value of these sessions is significant. Participants in the Young Reserve Officers Workshop (YROW) also attend the Symposium as part of their program to enhance their career development.

In parallel with the official meetings, events for Delegates-at-Large are held during the day, although they are also encouraged to attend the professional development sessions.

=== In Between Meetings ===
Additionally, 2–3 days of executive planning meetings are held in the Fall and Spring of each year. Attendance is at the discretion of the International President and typically involves Vice Presidents, Assistant Secretaries General, International Committee Chairs, Presidency staff, and other selected individuals by invitation.

== Notable members ==
- Lt Col HRH Prince Peter of Greece – CIOR president from 1962 to 1964

== List of successive presidents since 1948 ==
Year	Nation	President	Secretary General
1948 – 1952	Belgium	Maj Michel Deveze	Lt Col (Baron) Jean S. Bloch
1952 – 1954	France	Maj Marcel Rebourset	Lt Col Lucien Bochet
1954 – 1956	The Netherlands	Maj Aarnold Theodooir Kastein	Maj W. Erdmann
1956 – 1958	Luxembourg	Capt Gaston Kieffer	Capt Lucien Meyer
1958 – 1960	Denmark	Maj Arne Hoff	Maj F. Castenskiold-Benson
1960 – 1962	United States	Lt Col Leon G. Turrou	Col Edward F. Grecki
1962 – 1964	Greece	Lt Col HRH Prince Peter of Greece and Denmark	Capt Nicholaos Papantoniou
1964 – 1966	Italy	Lt GT Giuseppe Pizzorno	Brig Gianfranco Conati Barbaro
1966 – 1968	Germany	Como Hans Rudolf Rosing	Capt Hans Cohaus
1968 – 1970	Belgium	Lt Col (Baron) Jean S. Bloch	Capt George-Henri Deby
1970 – 1972	Norway	Cdr Per Birkevold	Maj Niels Ebbesen
1972 – 1974	France	Lt Col Louis Rouzee	Capt de Fregate Francis Renauldon
1974 –1976	United States	Maj Gen James E Frank	Col Robert S. Shea
1976 – 1978	United Kingdom	R Adm Philip Graham Sharp	Maj Oliver C. Champion
1978 – 1980	Canada	Maj Gen J. P. Charbonneau	Maj Gen Bruce J. Legge
1980 – 1982	Denmark	TC Peter J. Jorgensen	Lt Col Ole Arnold Busck
1982 – 1984	The Netherlands	Lt Col Baron Pierre Louis D’Aulnis	Lt Col Willem Venker
1984 – 1986	Italy	Col Dr Luigi Sartori	1Lt Franco Andreetta
1986 – 1988	Germany	Col Roland Ziegler	Sr Cdr Meinrad Prinz von Hohenzollern-Emden
1988 – 1990	Canada	Maj Gen R. W. Lewis	Brig Gen J.R. Genin
1990 – 1992	Norway	Lt Col (R) Torgeir Stensrud	Lt Col (R) Petter Th. Bagstevold
1992 – 1994	United States	Maj Gen Evan L. Hultman	Brig Gen Walter Vartan
1994 – 1996	France	Medecin General Etienne Tissot	Lt Col Patrice Fichet
1996 – 1998	United Kingdom	Brig Michael Browne	Capt Peter James
1998 – 2000	Belgium	Lt Col Eric Thiry	Lt Col Jean Pierre Vincke
2000 – 2002	Denmark	Lt Col Karsten Thuen	Lt Col Jesper Hjulmand
2002 – 2004	Italy	Lt Cdr Giuseppe Filippo Imbalzano	Capt Giuseppe Collot
2004 – 2006	Germany	Lt Col Hans-Jürgen Schraut	Major Christian J. Faul
2006 – 2008	Canada	Capt (Navy) Carman McNary	Major Derek Cheff/ Major James Cross
2008 – 2010	The Netherlands	LtCol Willem J. Verheijen	LtCol Arthur Bolder
2010 – 2012	Norway	Capt (Navy) Jon Erling Tenvik	Colonel Knut Jahr
2012 – 2014	France	Cdr Richard Roll	Col Herve Boca
2014 – 2016	Bulgaria	Lt Col Dimitar Popov	Lt Plamen Lazarov
2016 – 2018	Czech Republic	LtCol Arnost Libezny	1Lt Jaroslav Hajecek
2018 – 2020	United Kingdom	Col Christopher Lee Argent	Col Adrian Walton
2020 – 2022	Germany	Capt (Navy) Jan Hörmann	Maj André Roosen
2022 - 2024	Estonia	Lt Col Toomas Luman	Maj Andre Lilleleht
2024 - 2026	Nordic	Col Jørn Buø NO	LtCol Peter Winroth SWE, Cap. Pekka Sillanpää FIN, LtCol Lars Bak DK
2026 - 2028	Denmark	LtCol Lars Bak	Maj Ronny Vossen
