= 2016 in Norway =

- Centuries: 19th; 20th; 21st
- Decades: 1990s; 2000s; 2010s; 2020s
- See also: List of years in Norway

Events in the year 2016 in Norway.

== Incumbents ==
- Monarch – Harald V.
- Prime Minister – Erna Solberg (Conservative).

== Events ==
- 26 April – The CHC Helikopter Service Flight 241, carrying oil workers from the Gullfaks B platform in the North Sea, crashes near Turøy, and all thirteen crew and passengers die.

== Cultural events ==
=== January ===
- 21–24 January – Ice Music Festival in Geilo
- 27–30 January – Bodø Jazz Open in Bodø Municipality
- 29 January-7 February – Nordlysfestivalen in Tromsø Municipality

=== February ===
- 7 February – Oslo Operaball in Oslo
- 12–21 February – 2016 Winter Youth Olympics in Lillehammer

=== March ===
- 2–5 March – By:Larm 2016 in Oslo
- 5 March – 150th anniversary of the Storting building
- 4–13 March – Oslo International Church Music Festival 2016 in Oslo
- 23–26 March – Inferno Metal Festival 2016 in Oslo

=== May ===
- 28 May – 200th anniversary of the Norwegian Bible Society

=== Date missing ===
- Kaja Nordengen releases Your Superstar Brain (Hjernen er stjernen), which sells 100,000 copies and also accentuates a trend of rhyming book titles.

== Notable deaths ==
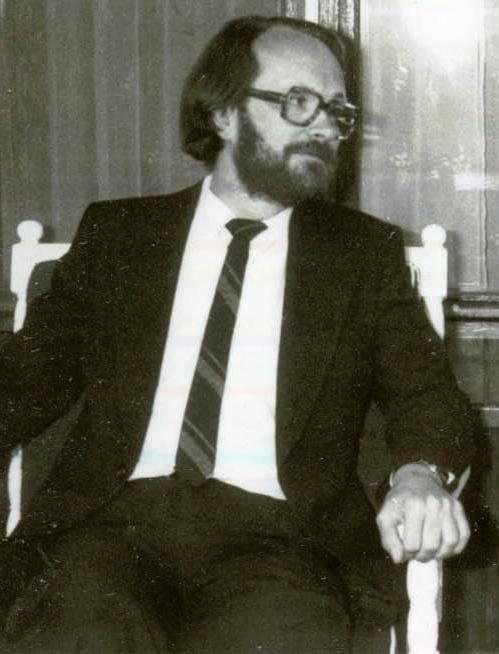
Berge Furre

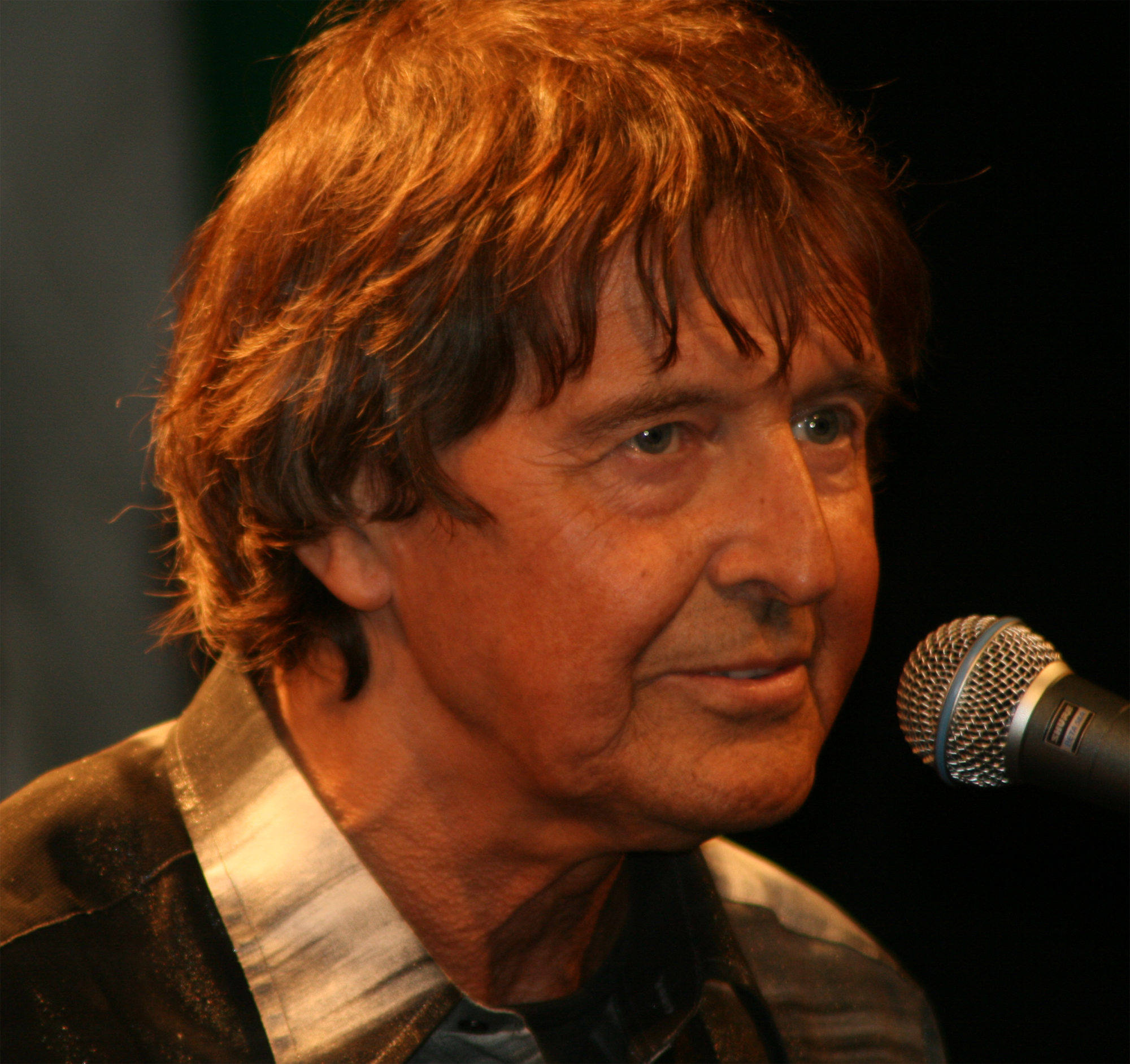
Sverre Kjelsberg

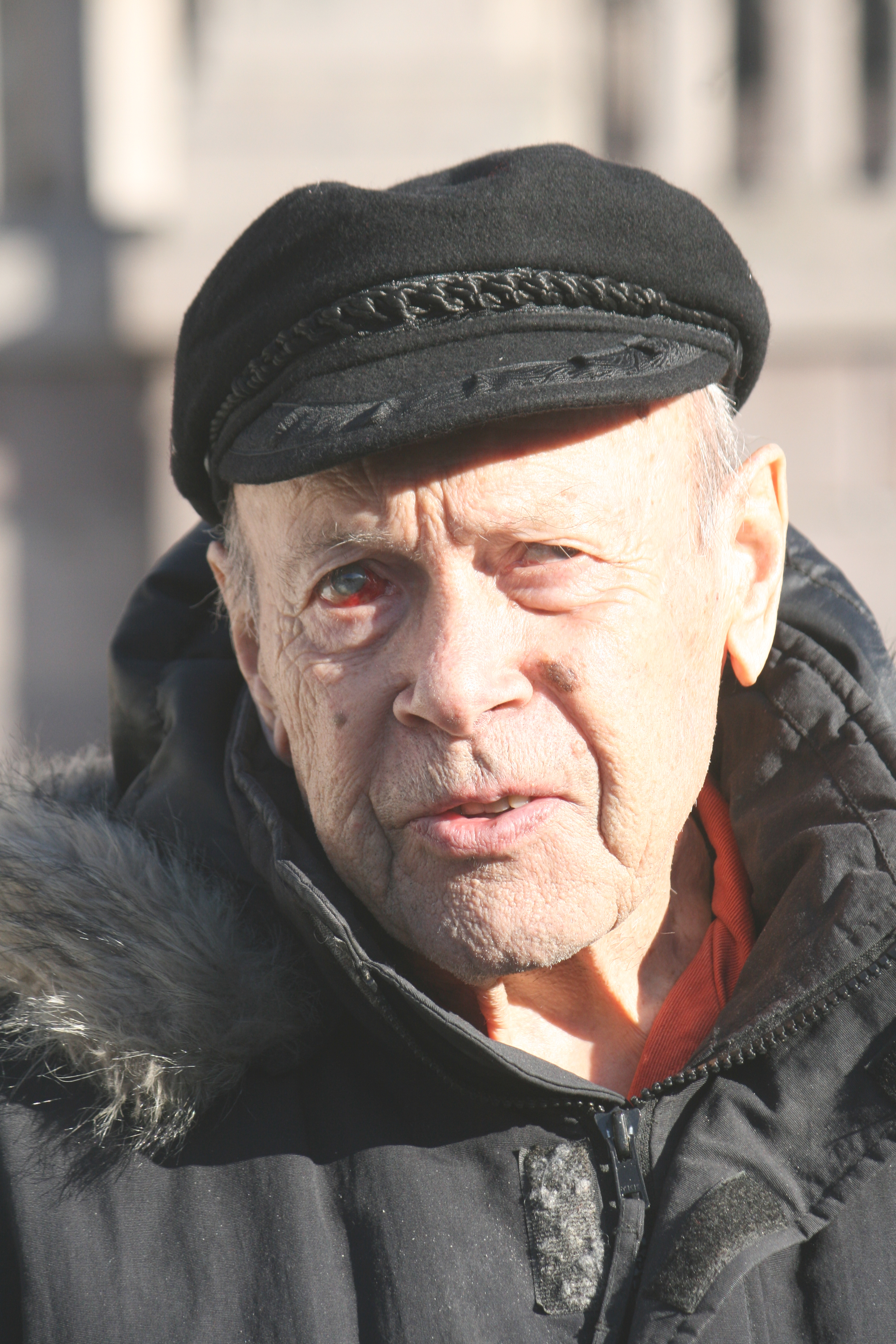
Gunnar Garbo

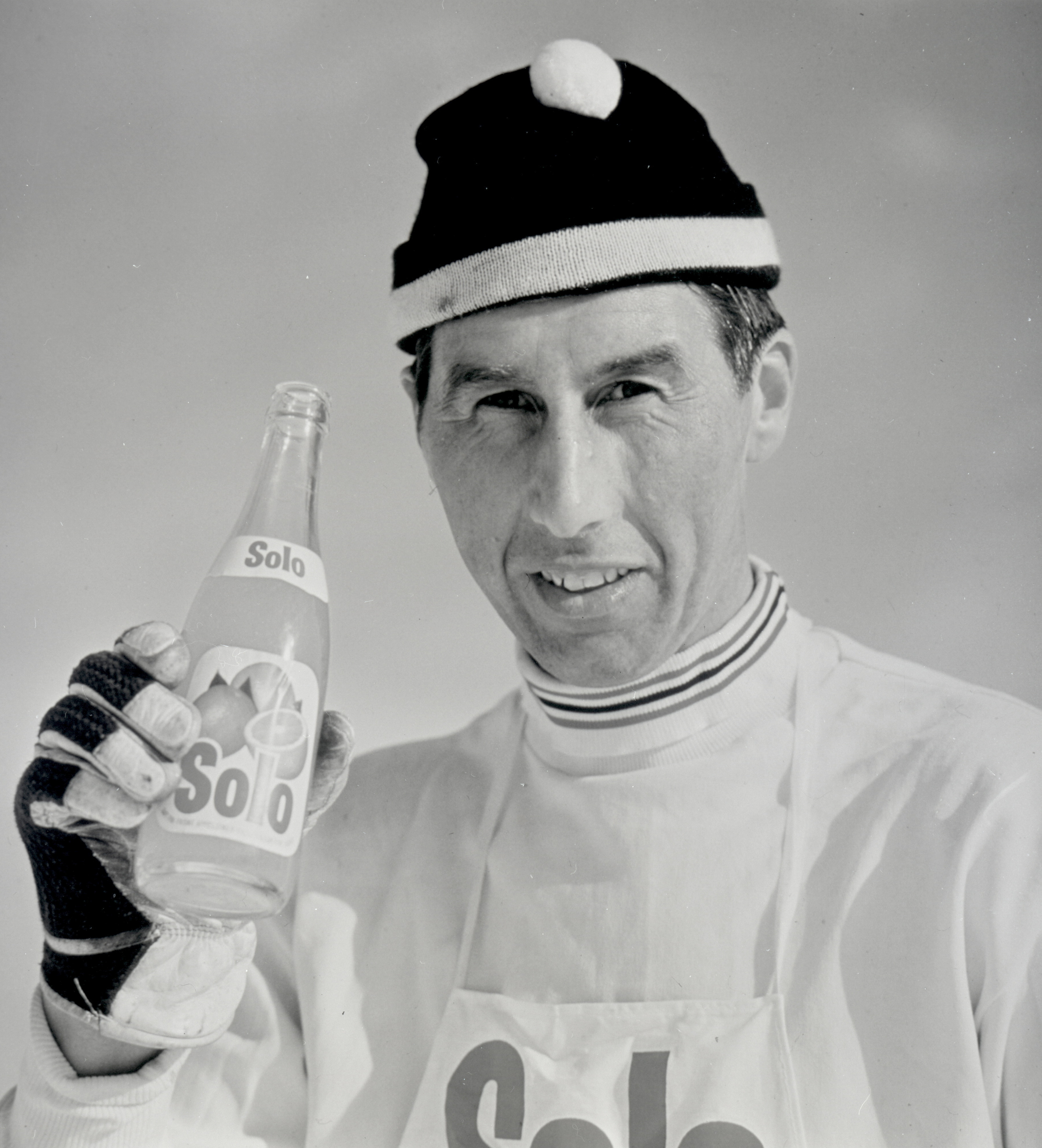
Harald Grønningen

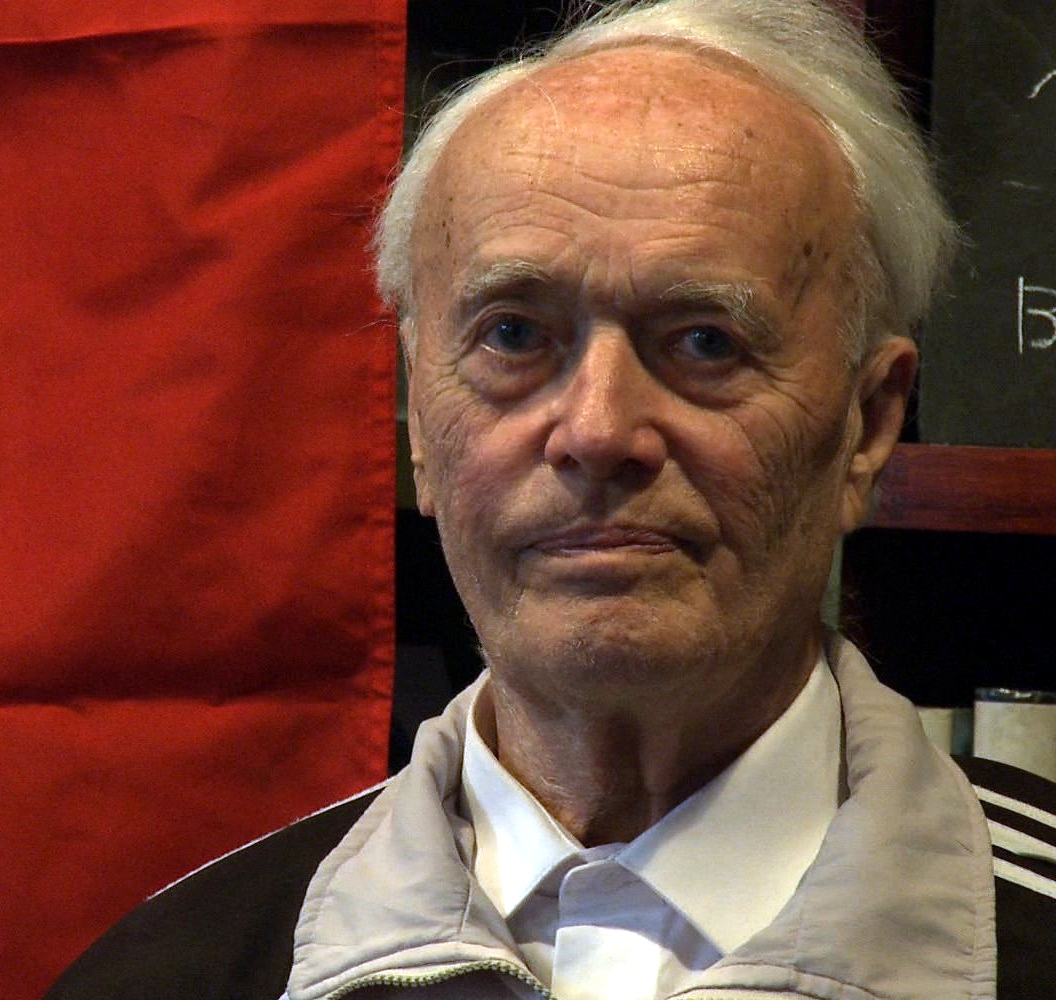
Haakon Sørbye

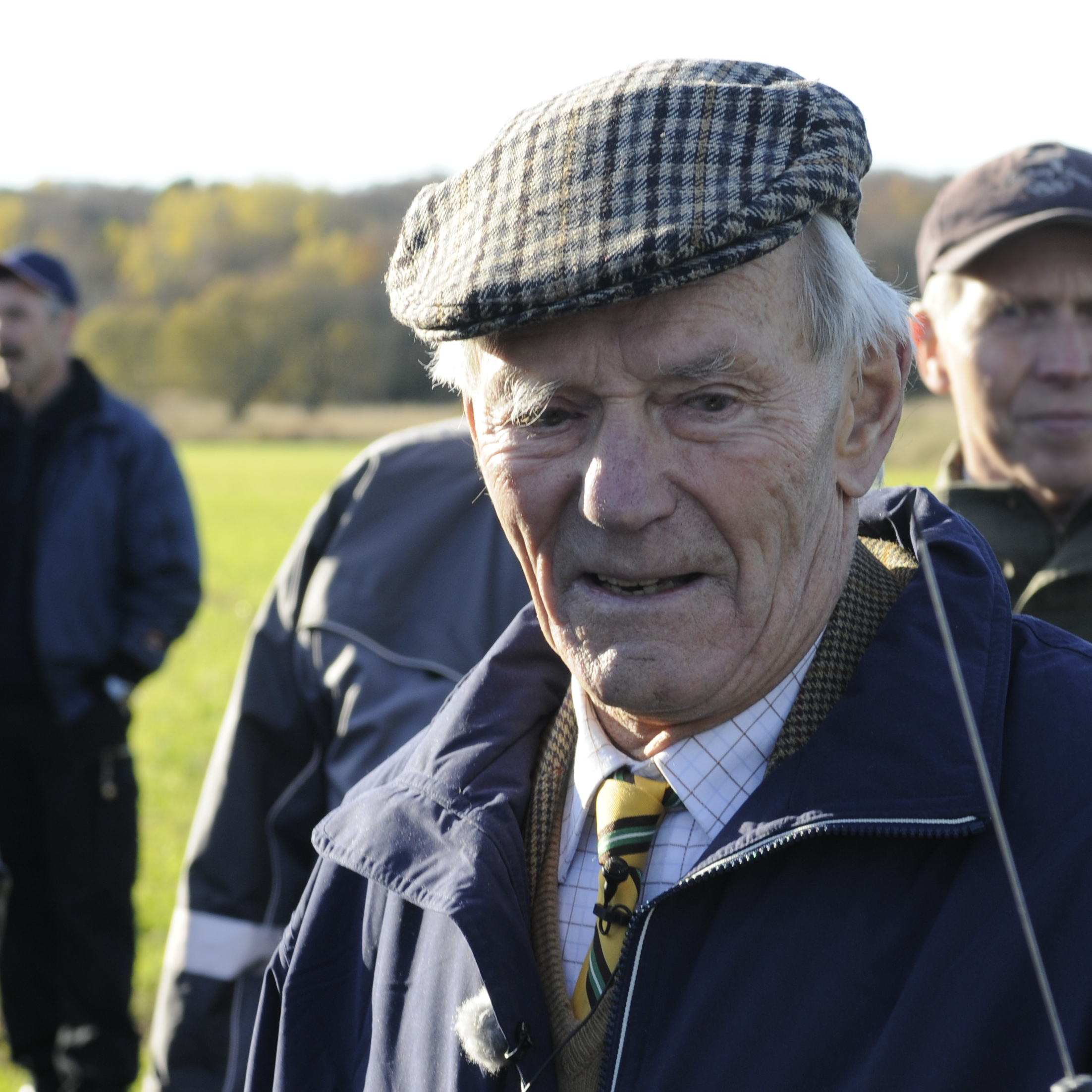
Wilhelm Mohr

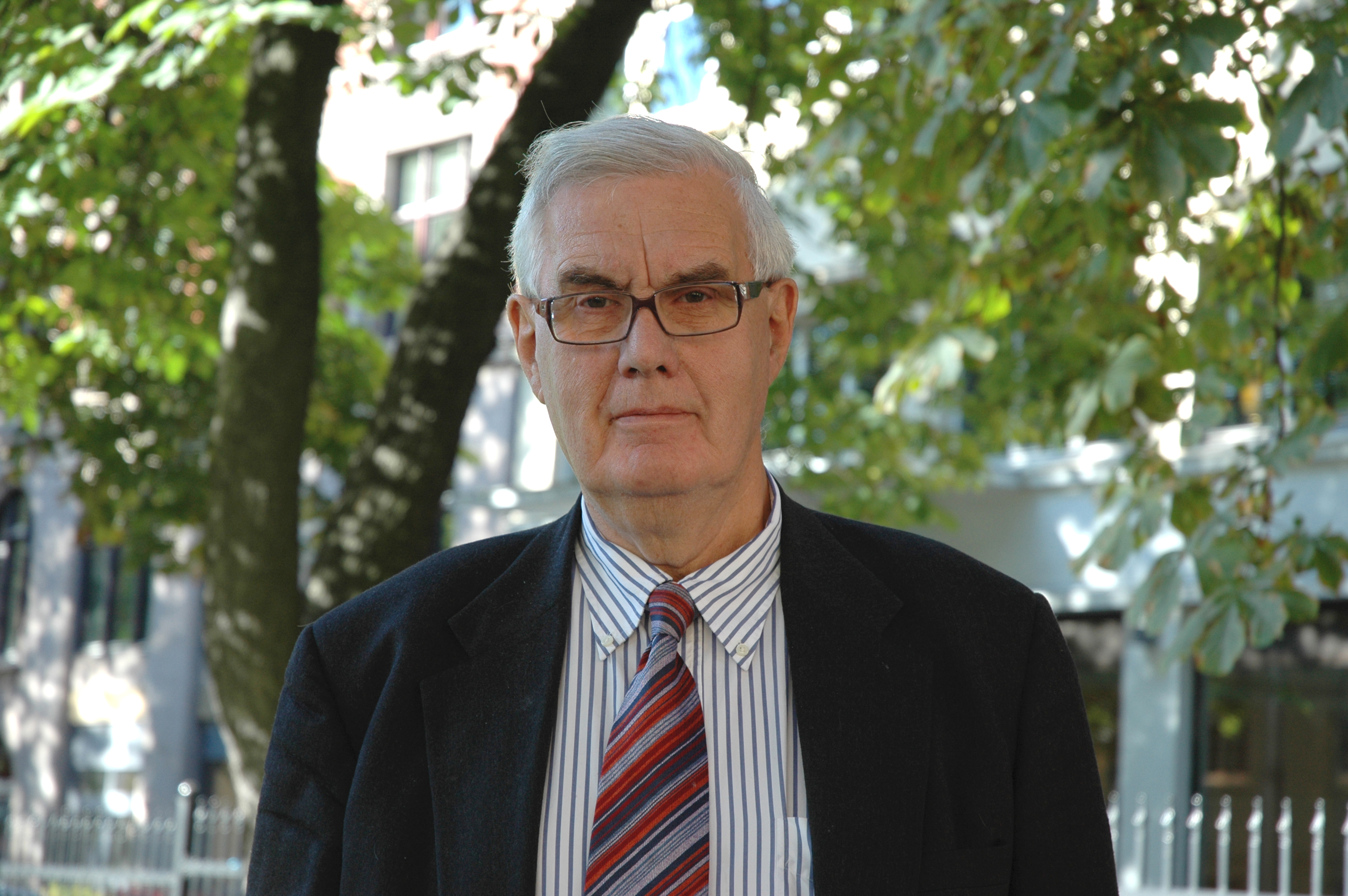
Georg Apenes

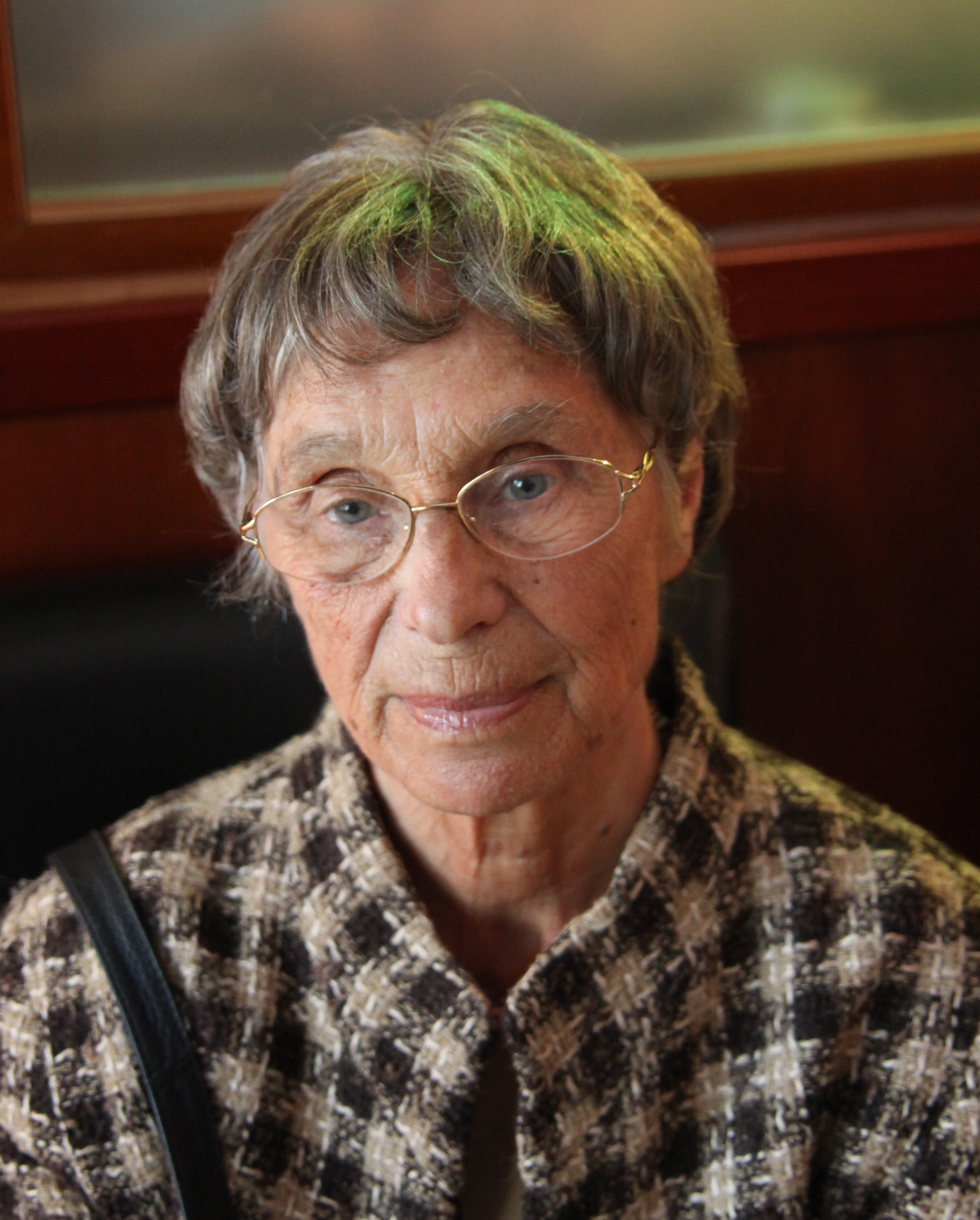
Ida Blom

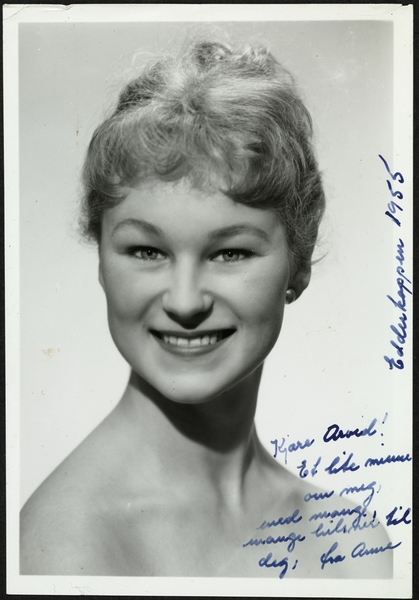
Anne Borg

- 5 January – Hanna-Marie Weydahl, pianist (b. 1922)
- 9 January – Elnar Seljevold, correspondent (b. 1934)
- 10 January – Bård Breivik, sculptor (b. 1948)
- 11 January – Berge Furre, politician (b. 1937)
- 12 January – Thor Furulund, painter (b. 1943)
- 18 January – Lars Roar Langslet, politician (b. 1936)
- 18 January – Leif Dubard, radio personality (b. 1931)
- 18 January – Karsten Isachsen, priest and speaker (b. 1944)
- 18 January – Nicolaus Zwetnow, sport shooter and physician (b. 1929)
- 20 January – Helga Salvesen, physician (b. 1963)
- 24 January – Fredrik Barth, social anthropologist (b. 1928)
- 25 January – Leif Solberg, composer (b. 1914)
- 30 January – Tias Eckhoff, designer (b. 1926)
- 1 February – Paul Cappelen, architect (b. 1928)
- 2 February – Dag Gundersen, lexicographer (b. 1928)
- 3 February – Arnold Weiberg-Aurdal, politician (b. 1925)
- 5 February – Carl E. Wang, politician (b. 1930)
- 8 February – Erlend Østgaard, physicist (b. 1938)
- 10 February – Jakob Aano, politician (b. 1920)
- 12 February – Martin Jensen, athlete (b. 1942)
- 12 February – Sossen Krohg, actress (b. 1923)
- 12 February – Bergljot Hobæk Haff, novelist (b. 1925)
- 17 February – Arthur J. Aasland, businessperson (b. 1934)
- 19 February – Harald Devold, jazz saxophonist (b. 1964)
- 19 February – Jon Anders Helseth, radio and TV presenter (b. 1933)
- 22 February – Christian Berg-Nielsen, diplomat (b. 1929)
- 26 February – Ivan Kristoffersen, editor (b. 1931)
- 28 February – Hallstein Rasmussen, civil servant (b. 1925)
- 1 March – Magnhild Bråthen, concentration camp survivor (b. 1924)
- 4 March – Thea Knutzen, politician (b. 1930)
- 5 March – Even Hansen, footballer (b. 1923)
- 7 March – Magnus Ulleland, philologist (b. 1929)
- 11 March – Kari Diesen, Jr., entertainer (b. 1939)
- 20 March – Sveinung Valle, politician (b. 1959)
- 24 March – Johannes Elviken, speed skater (b. 1912)
- 30 March – Anne Aasheim, editor (b. 1962)
- 4 April – Jarle Bondevik, philologist (b. 1934)
- 5 April – Kari Børresen, theologian (b. 1932)
- 4 April – Andris Snortheim, children's musician (b. 1950)
- 9 April – Finn Hodt, speed skater (b. 1919)
- 24 April – Jan Henrik Kayser, pianist (b. 1933)
- 28 April – Fredrik Grønningsæter, bishop (b. 1923)
- 5 May – Martha Seim Valeur, politician (b. 1923)
- 16 May – Bjarne Saltnes, politician (b. 1934)
- 18 May – Astrid Gunnestad, editor and radio presenter (b. 1938)
- 18 May – Skjalg Jensen, politician (b. 1967)
- 23 May – Arne Sandnes, politician (b. 1924)
- 23 May – Vera Henriksen, author (b. 1927)
- 25 May – Per Øien, musician (b. 1937)
- 27 May – Kai G. Henriksen, businessman (b. 1956)
- 30 May – Jan Aas, footballer (b. 1944)
- 31 May – Olav Djupvik, politician (b. 1931)
- 3 June – Arve Solstad, editor (b. 1935)
- 4 June – Geirmund Ihle, politician (b. 1934)
- 8 June – Terje Fjærn, band leader (b. 1942)
- 10 June – Alfred Oftedal Telhaug, educationalist (b. 1934)
- 10 June – Per Bakken, industrialist (b. 1937)
- 11 June – Lars Skytøen, politician (b. 1929)
- 12 June – Gunnar Gran, editor (b. 1931)
- 12 June – Dagfinn Gedde-Dahl, physician (b. 1937)
- 14 June – Per Hovdenakk, museum director (b. 1935)
- 15 June – Erik Enger, physician (b. 1927)
- 17 June – Willy Andresen, musician (b. 1921)
- 17 June – Reidar Kvaal, resistance member (b. 1916)
- 18 June – Sverre Kjelsberg, musician (b. 1946)
- 27 June – Anfin Skaaheim, missionary leader (b. 1939)
- 27 June – Stein Madsen, footballer (b. 1954)
- 28 June – Ragnar Pedersen, ethnologist (b. 1941)
- 29 June – Gunnar Garbo, politician (b. 1924)
- 29 June – Frode Nilsen, diplomat (b. 1923)
- 4 July – Kjell Olaf Jensen, literary critic (b. 1946)
- 14 July – Tor Lian, handball official (b. 1945)
- 22 July – Geir Myhre, ice hockey player (b. 1954)
- 23 July – Carl Falck, wholesaler (b. 1907)
- 24 July – Håkon Fimland, hurdler (b. 1942)
- 28 July – Marianne Ihlen, person (b. 1935)
- 31 July – Jon Klette, jazz saxophonist (b. 1962)
- 31 July – Kjell Underlid, psychologist (b. 1950)
- 4 August – Eivald Røren, scientist (b. 1932)
- 5 August – Erling Ree-Pedersen, tax director (b. 1922)
- 6 August – Jan Wilsgaard, Volvo designer (b. 1930)
- 9 August – Per Müller, singer (b. 1932)
- 10 August – Helen Brinchmann, actress (b. 1918)
- 11 August – Sigbjørn Ravnåsen, politician (b. 1941)
- 13 August – Holger Ursin, professor of medicine (b. 1934)
- 15 August – Knut Kjøk, fiddler (b. 1948)
- 16 August – Knut Aunbu, television producer (b. 1943)
- 18 August – Fred Nøddelund, musician (b. 1947)
- 22 August – Per Lønning, bishop and politician (b. 1928)
- 23 August – Berit Mørdre, skier (b. 1940)
- 26 August – Harald Grønningen, skier (b. 1934)
- 30 August – Peter Wollnick, radio presenter (b. 1927)
- 1 September – Leif Mæhle, philologist (b. 1927)
- 2 September – Thorstein Sandholt, speed skater (b. 1935)
- 3 September – Jan Otto Hauge, editor (b. 1945)
- 3 September – Jan Nilsen, footballer (b. 1937)
- 10 September – Knut Wiggen, composer (b. 1927)
- 10 September – Sonja Barth, environmentalist (b. 1923)
- 11 September – Per Brandtzæg, professor of medicine (b. 1936)
- 12 September – Tor Brustad, biophysicist (b. 1926)
- 15 September – Haakon Sørbye, resistance member (b. 1920)
- 21 September – Ragnar Hvidsten, footballer (b. 1926)
- 22 September – Svein Gunnar Morgenlien, politician (b. 1922)
- 24 September – Wenche Lowzow, politician (b. 1926)
- 26 September – Wilhelm Mohr, aviation officer (b. 1917)
- 26 September – Jens Lothe, physicist (b. 1931)
- 28 September – Gunnar Block Watne, industrialist (b. 1929)
- 30 September – Lilleba Lund Kvandal, opera singer (b. 1940)
- 2 October – Georg Apenes, politician (b. 1940)
- 8 October – Jan "Jonas" Gulbrandsen, footballer (b. 1933)
- 10 October – Hans Petter Langtangen, computer scientist (b. 1962)
- 10 October – Christian Erlandsen, physician and politician (b. 1926)
- 10 October – Benn Mikalsen, politician (b. 1956)
- 15 October – Per Rune Wølner, footballer (b. 1949)
- 21 October – Kjell Aas, physician (b. 1924)
- 24 October – Johan Stølan, politician (b. 1939)
- 25 October – Bjørn Lidin Hansen, footballer (b. 1989)
- 30 October – Leif Einar Plahter, art historian (b. 1929)
- 1 November – Sverre Andersen, footballer (b. 1936)
- 3 November – Turid Karlsen Seim, theologian (b. 1945)
- 7 November – Birger Jansen, ice hockey player (b. 1948)
- 11 November – Lauritz Bernhard Sirevaag, politician (b. 1926)
- 13 November – Aslaug Fadum, politician (b. 1925)
- 22 November – Per Sundby, physician (b. 1926)
- 25 November – Marit Kalstad, children's writer (b. 1931)
- 26 November – Alv Gjestvang, speed skater (b. 1937)
- 26 November – Ida Blom, historian (b. 1931)
- 27 November – Eystein Paasche, botanist (b. 1932)
- 2 December – Tove Kari Viken, politician (b. 1942)
- 6 December – Jan Frøystein Halvorsen, Supreme Court Justice (b. 1928)
- 11 December – Oddvar S. Kvam, composer (b. 1927)
- 14 December – Arnie Norse, entertainer (b. 1925)
- 18 December – Rolf Trygve Busch, diplomat (b. 1920)
- 18 December – Vibeke Knudsen, diplomat (b. 1948)
- 19 December – Anne Borg, dancer (b. 1936)
- 26 December – Joachim Calmeyer, actor (b. 1931)

== See also ==
- 2016 in Norwegian music
- 2016 in Norwegian television
