= 1937 in Norway =

- Centuries: 18th; 19th; 20th; 21st
- Decades: 1910s; 1920s; 1930s; 1940s; 1950s
- See also: List of years in Norway

Events in the year 1937 in Norway.

== Incumbents ==
- Monarch – Haakon VII.
- Prime Minister – Johan Nygaardsvold (Labour Party)

== Events ==
- 29 May – Stavanger Airport, Sola is opened by King Haakon VII
- Municipal and county elections are held throughout the country.
- A flash flood destroys 20 houses in the Sima Valley, Hordaland. No lives are lost.

== Notable births ==
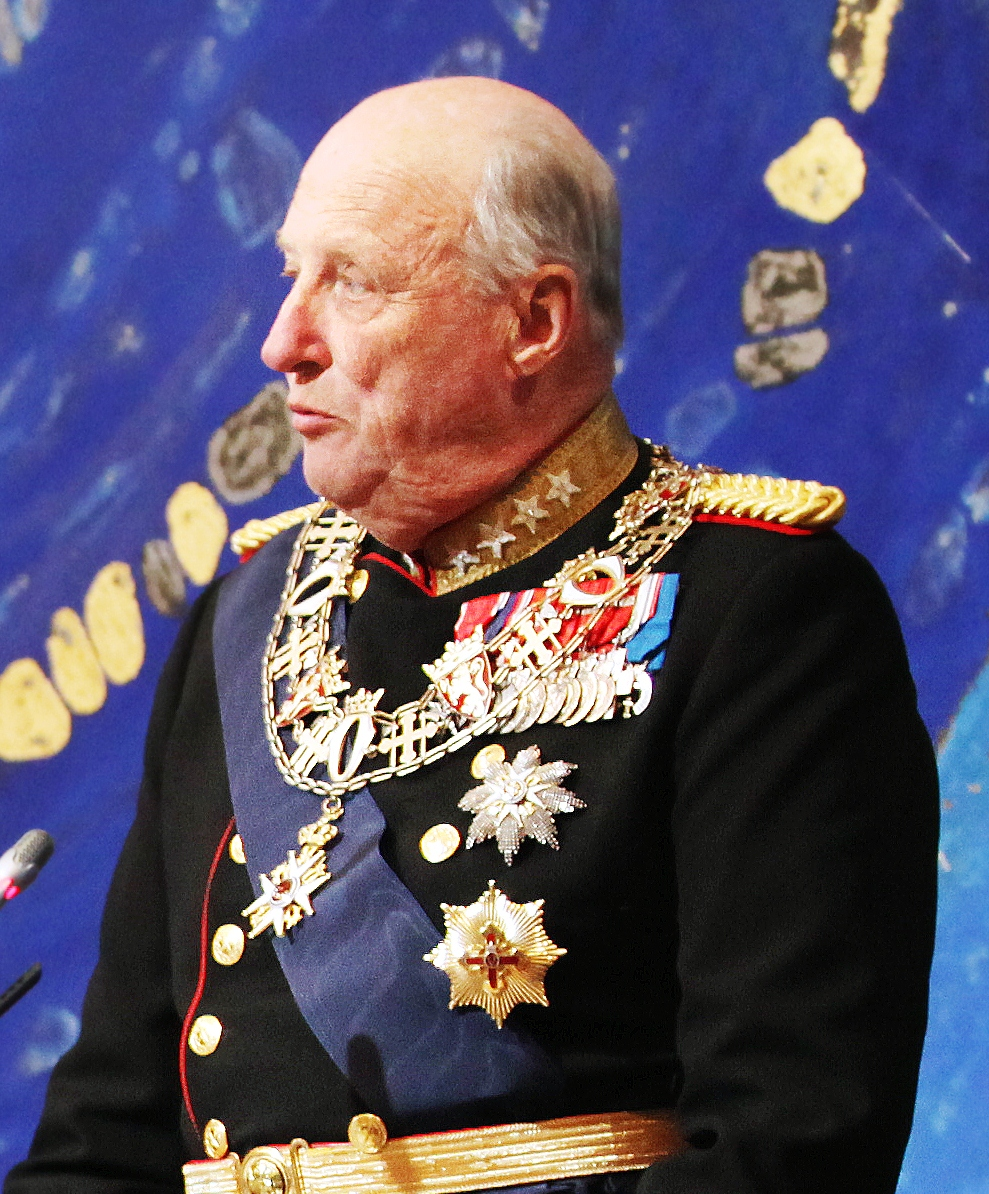
Harald V of Norway

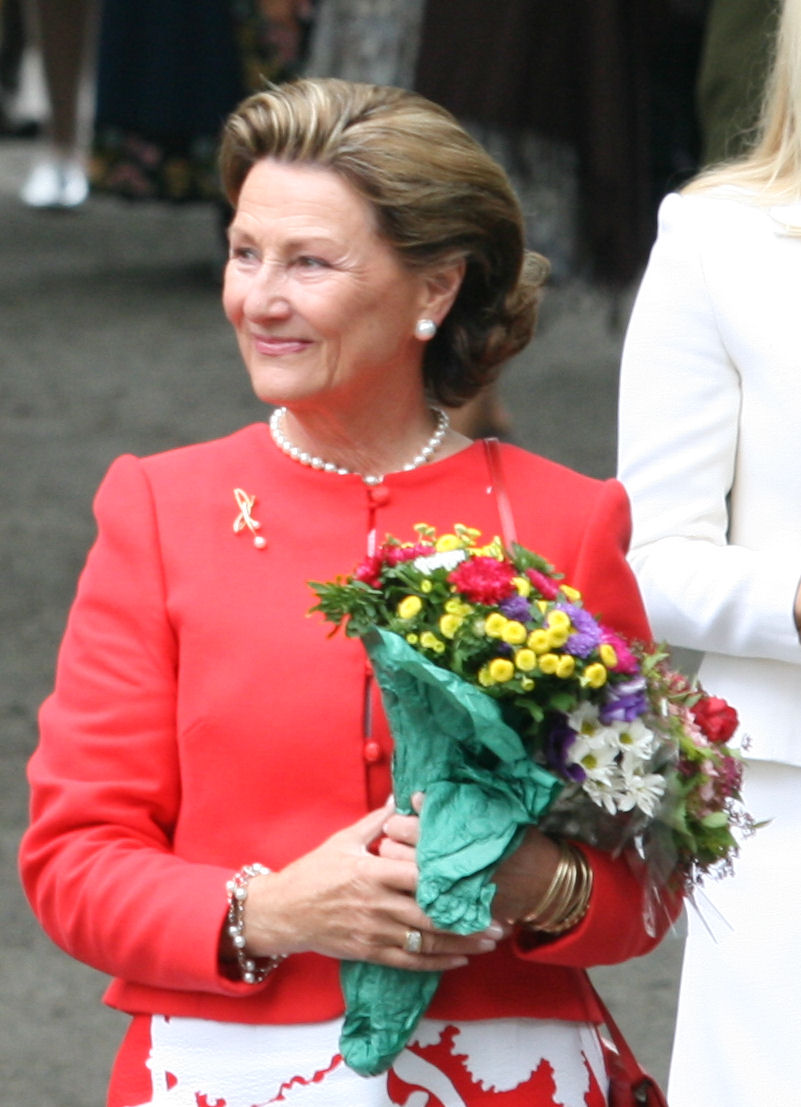
Queen Sonja of Norway

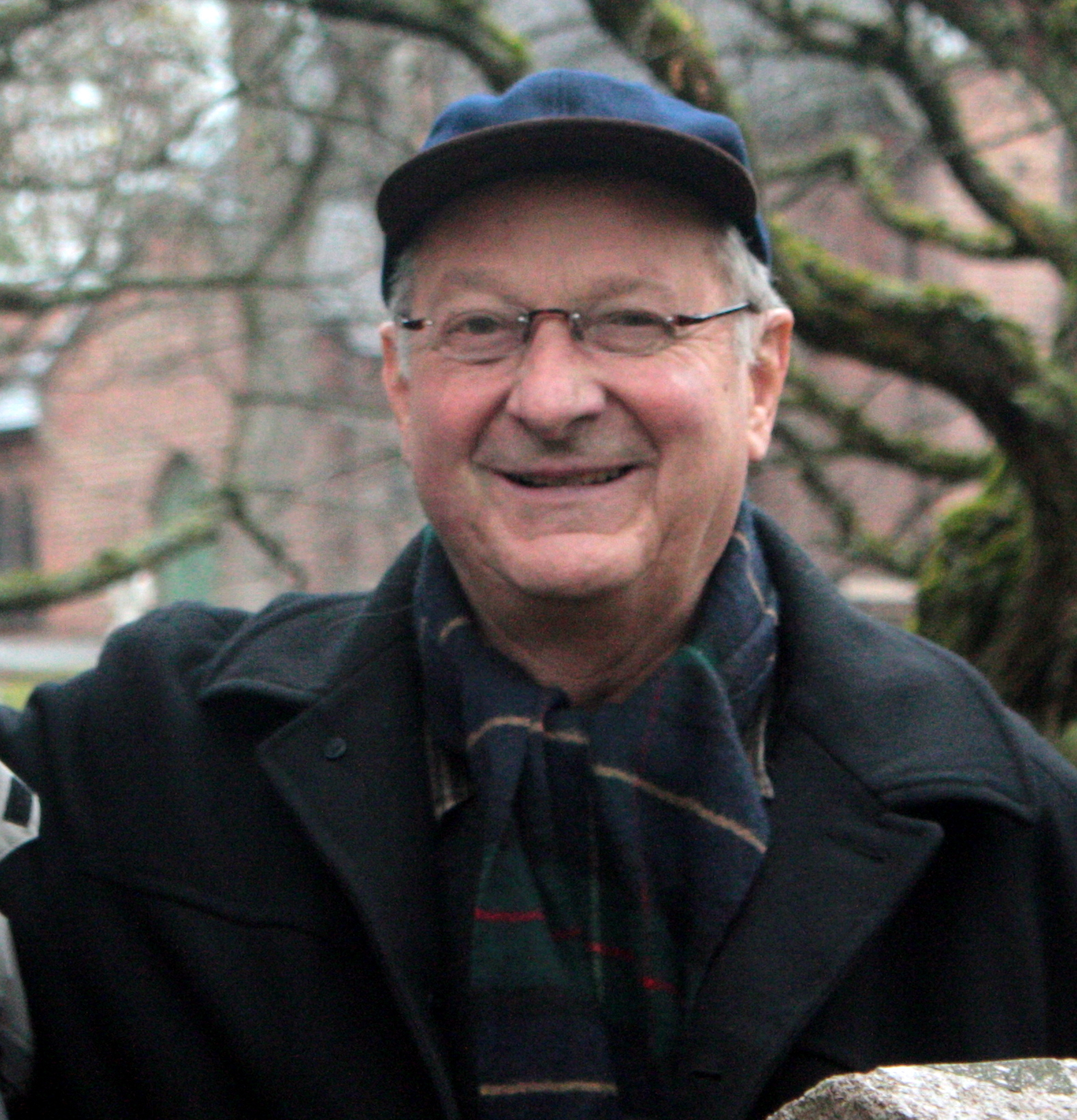
Johan Fredrik Heyerdahl

- 4 January – Harald Barlie, Greco-Roman wrestler (died 1995)
- 4 January – Ole Kristian Grimnes, historian
- 4 January – Per Tresselt, diplomat (died 2025).
- 9 January – Arne Malmedal, painter, illustrator and printmaker (died 2018).
- 11 February – Ola Teigen, politician (died 1970)
- 17 February – Bjørn Wiik, physicist (died 1999)
- 18 February – Halle Jørn Hanssen, television correspondent, development aid administrator and politician
- 21 February – Harald V, King of Norway
- 22 February – Bjarte Eikeset, jurist and politician
- 6 March – Arild Nyquist, novelist, poet, children's writer and musician (died 2004).
- 10 March – Alfred Janson, pianist and composer (died 2019).
- 23 March – Per Olav Wiken, sailor and Olympic silver medallist (died 2011).
- 13 April – Berge Furre, historian, theologian and politician
- 15 April – Johan J. Jakobsen, politician and Minister (died 2016)
- 18 April – Arne Alsåker Spilde, politician (died 2018)
- 21 April – Henrik Jahre, politician
- 7 May – Gullow Gjeseth, Army officer (died 2017.
- 10 May – Arthur Arntzen, journalist, humorist, actor and writer (died 2025).
- 11 May – Per Brunvand, newspaper editor (died 2015)
- 21 May – Grete Randsborg Jenseg, writer (died 2025).
- 24 May – Fredrik Torp, architect
- 2 June – Geir Kjetsaa, professor of Russian literary history, translator and author (died 2008).
- 28 June – Odd Bergh, triple jumper and long jumper (died 2023)
- 4 July – Queen Sonja of Norway
- 29 July – Pål Bang-Hansen, actor, film producer, film critic and television personality (died 2010).
- 3 August – Gudrun Waadeland, actress and theatre director (died 2020)
- 20 August – Kjell Hovik, pole vaulter
- 4 September – Per Risvik, politician
- 6 September – Tom Veierød, civil servant
- 13 September – Alv Gjestvang, speed skater and Olympic silver medallist (died 2016).
- 14 September – Dag C. Weberg, politician
- 18 September – Per Flatberg, environmentalist and pharmacist (died 2022)
- 24 September – Børre Knudsen, Lutheran minister and anti-abortion activist (died 2022)
- 26 September – Aud Blattmann, politician (died 2023)
- 7 October – Hans Normann Dahl, illustrator and painter (died 2019).
- 16 October – Reidar Hjermstad, cross country skier
- 17 October – Svein Johannessen, chess player, became Norway's second International Master (died 2007)
- 21 October – Johan Fredrik Heyerdahl, publisher and secretary general (died 2021).
- 31 October – Per Øien, flutist (died 2016).
- 14 November – Bjørn Bang Andersen, shot putter
- 23 November – Turi Widerøe, Norway's first female air transport pilot
- 29 November – Johan Jørgen Holst, politician and Minister (died 1994)
- 1 December – Bodolf Hareide, politician
- 3 December – Willy Rasmussen, javelin thrower (died 2018)
- 8 December – Arne Næss, Jr., businessman and mountaineer (died 2004)
- 23 December – Arne Larsen, Nordic combined skier and World Champion
- 24 December – Ola Wærhaug, biathlete, Olympic silver medallist and World Champion (died 2025) .
- 29 December – Hjalmar Inge Sunde, military officer
- 30 December – Einar Johan Rasmussen, ships engineer and ship owner.
- 31 December – Bjørn Rønningen, children's writer

=== Full date unknown ===
- Jan Balstad, politician and Minister
- Knut Boye, civil economist (died 2008)
- Ronald Bye, politician and Minister (died 2018)
- Nils Petter Faarlund, mountaineer.
- Øyvind Gustavsen, civil servant
- Einfrid Halvorsen, politician
- Knut Hartvig Johannson, businessperson
- Oddrunn Pettersen, politician and Minister (died 2002)
- Gudmund Restad, politician and Minister (died 2021)
- Wenche Frogn Sellæg, politician and Minister

== Notable deaths ==
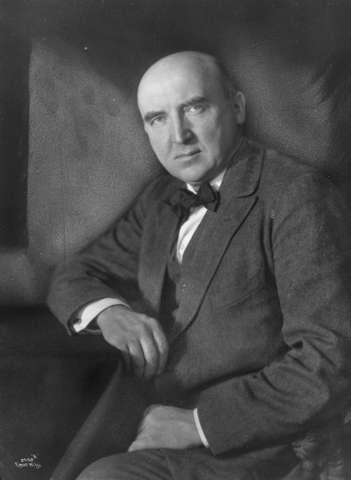
Harald Stormoen

- 7 January – Hjalmar Nygaard, boxer (born 1900)
- 4 May – Gina Oselio, opera singer (born 1858).
- 19 July – Sigurd Asserson, civil servant (born 1882)
- 27 July – Hans Dahl, painter (born 1849)
- 27 October – Harald Pettersen, businessperson and politician (born 1869)
- 14 November – Harald Stormoen, actor (born 1872)
- 23 December – Nils Collett Vogt, poet (born 1864)
