= 1936 in Norway =

- Centuries: 18th; 19th; 20th; 21st
- Decades: 1910s; 1920s; 1930s; 1940s; 1950s
- See also: List of years in Norway

Events in the year 1936 in Norway.

== Incumbents ==
- Monarch – Haakon VII.
- Prime Minister - Johan Nygaardsvold (Labour Party)

== Events ==
- 13 September – A major rockfall hit the lake Loenvatnet in Sogn og Fjordane, creating a 70 m (230 ft) flood wave that destroyed several farms, killing 74 people. The second such incident in 31 years, the disaster caused the permanent depopulation of the area.
- Norsk Hydro opens its Herøya plant for the production of artificial fertilizer.
- The 1936 Parliamentary election takes place. This was the last Norwegian parliamentary election held before World War II and the German invasion of Norway.
- 19 December - Leon Trotsky depart Norway for Mexico.

== Popular culture ==
=== Sports ===
- Ivar Ballangrud was olympic and world champion of speed skating.

=== Literature ===
- The Knut Hamsund novel Ringen sluttet (The Ring is Closed), was published.

== Notable births ==
=== January – March ===
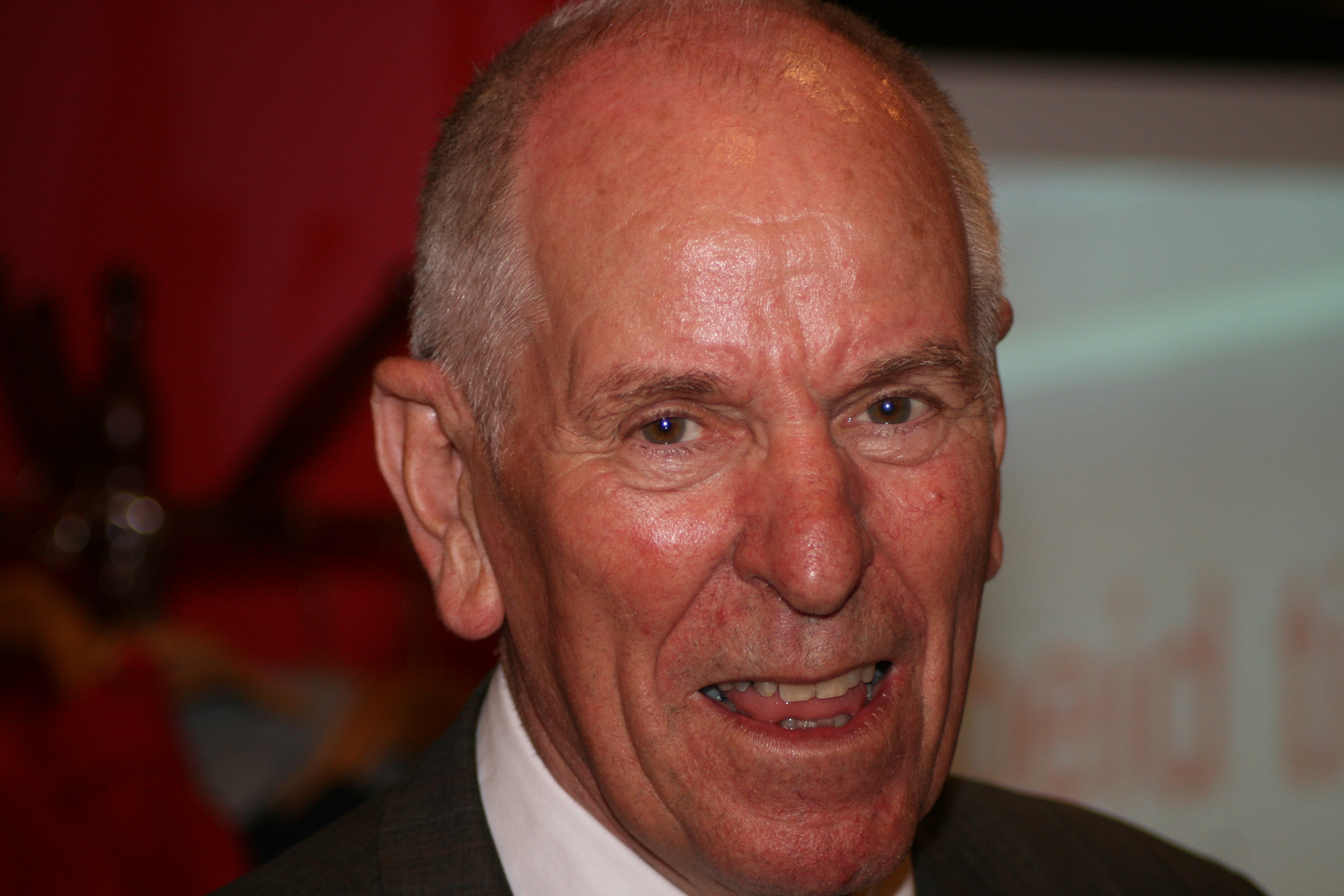
Kjell Opseth

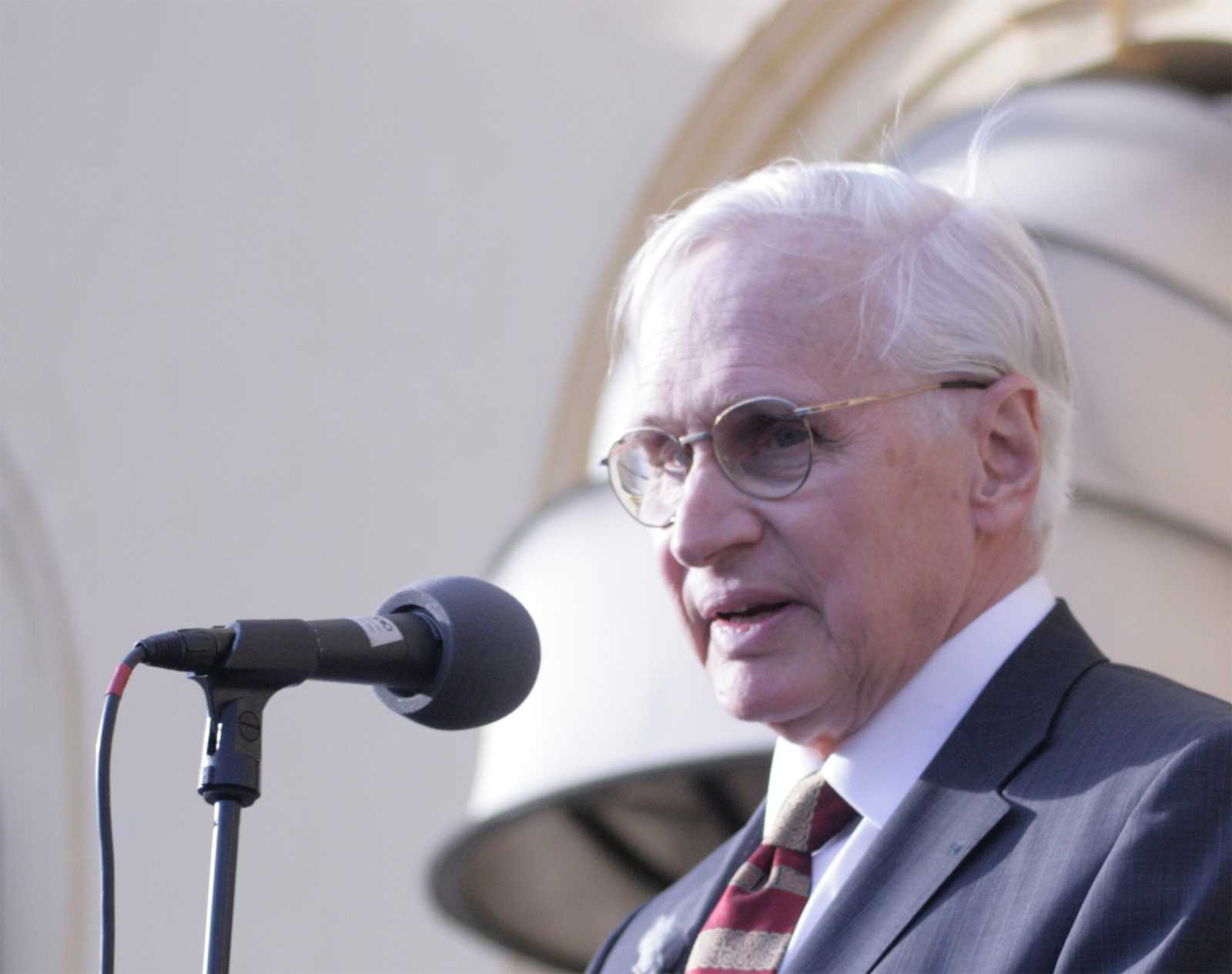
Francis Sejersted

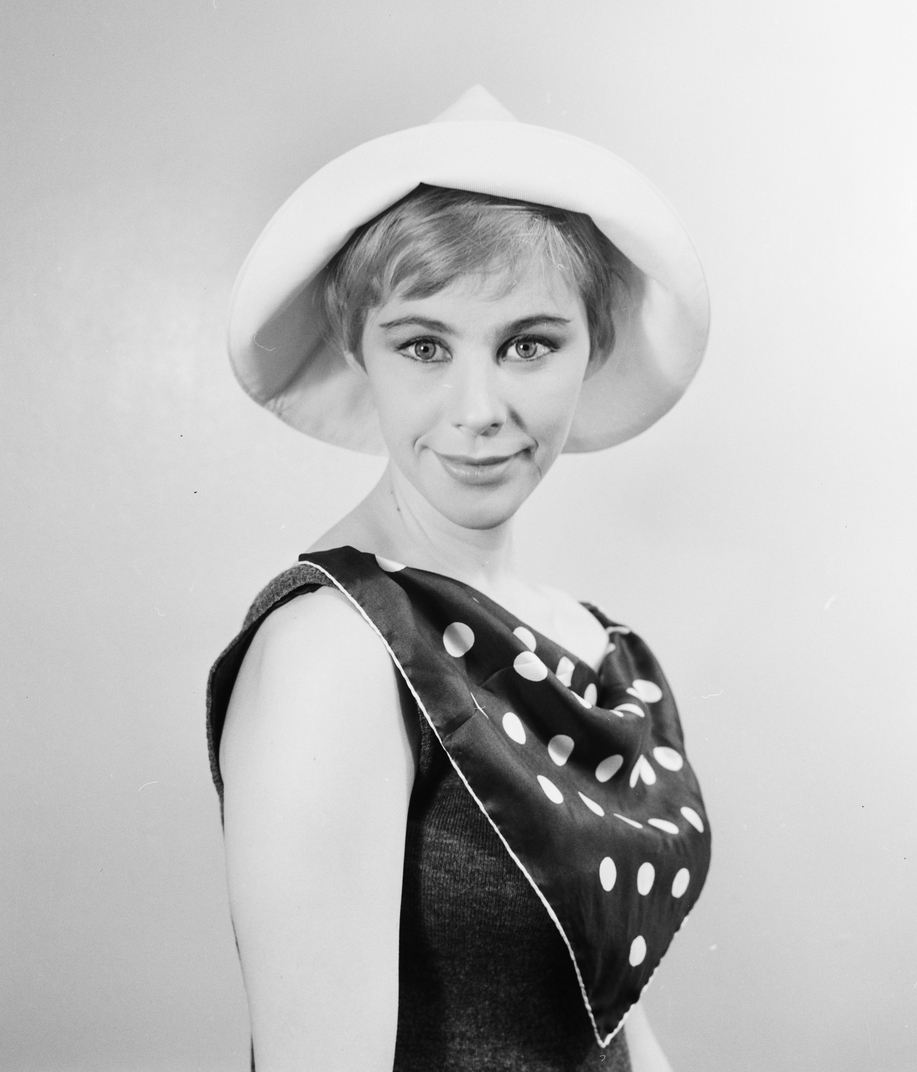
Henny Moan

- 2 January – Kjell Opseth, politician (died 2017).
- 6 January – Carl Julius Norstrøm, economist (died 2012)
- 13 January – Jan Brøgger, professor of social anthropology and clinical psychologist (died 2006).
- 23 January – Jon Østeng Hov, photographer and writer (died 2019)
- 26 January – Tom Vraalsen, politician and ambassador (died 2021).
- 31 January – Nils Aaness, speed skater (died 2024).
- 4 February – Ole Johs. Brunæs, politician (died 2019)
- 8 February – Francis Sejersted, history professor (died 2015)
- 15 February – Arne Haaland, chemist (died 2023).
- 22 February – Henny Moan, actress (died 2024).
- 28 February – Ole-Jørgen Nilsen, actor and theatre director (died 2008)
- 5 March – Lars Roar Langslet, politician (died 2016)
- 6 March – Finn-Erik Vinje, philologist (died 2026).

=== April – June ===
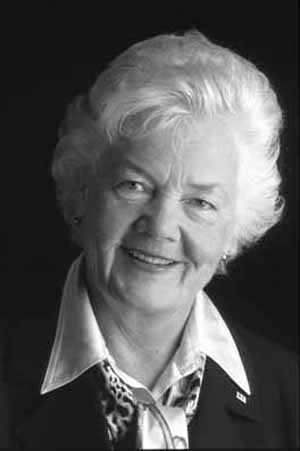
Astrid Nøklebye Heiberg

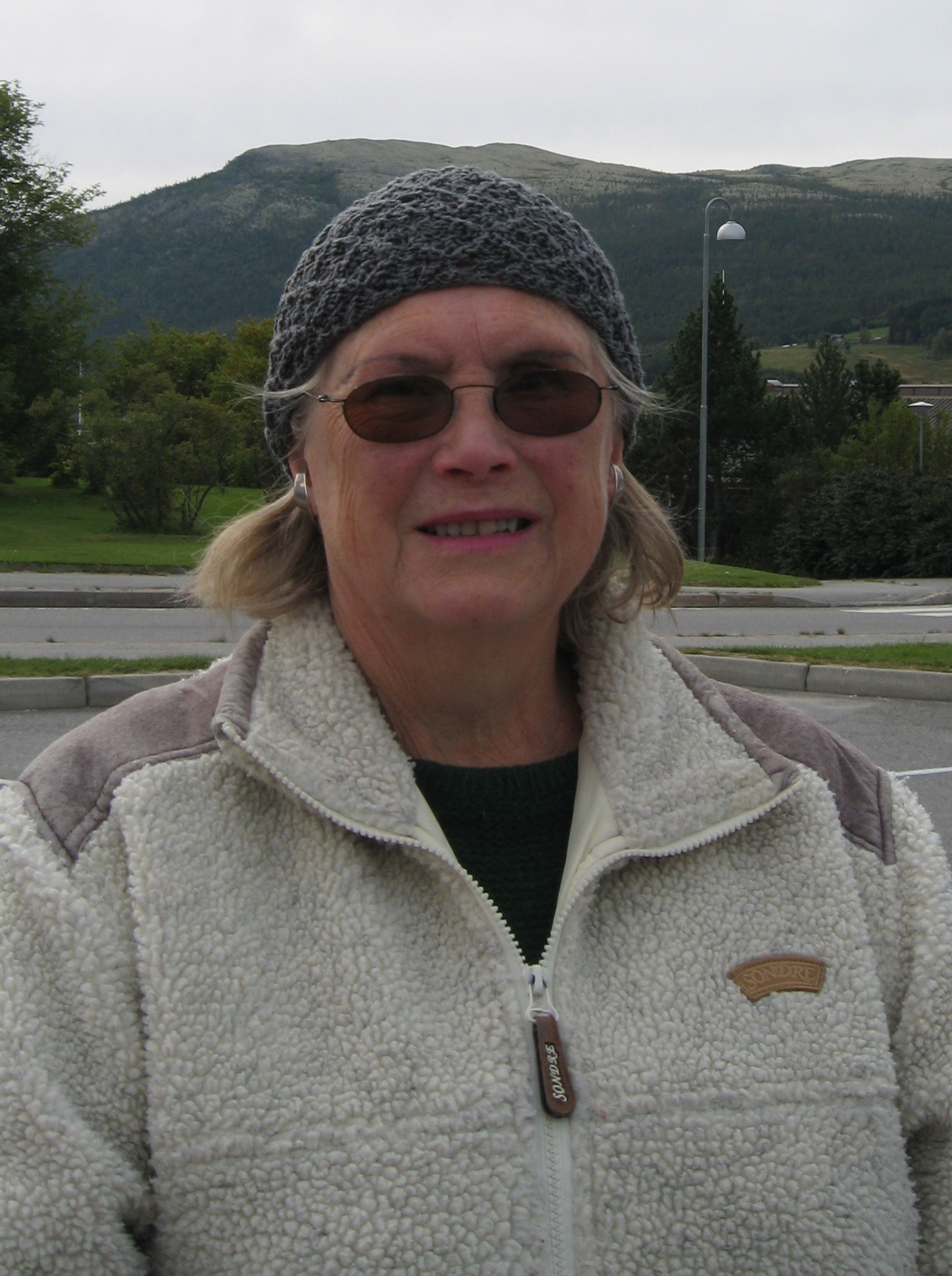
Unni-Lise Jonsmoen

- 12 April – Øystein Lønn, writer (died 2022).
- 14 April – Astrid Nøklebye Heiberg, politician and professor of medicine (died 2020)
- 15 April – Gunnar Aasland, judge
- 17 April – Dagny Hald, ceramist (died 2001).
- 21 April – Unni-Lise Jonsmoen, illustrator and children's writer (died 2026).
- 25 April – Einar Olsen, newspaper editor
- 1 May – Thor-Øistein Endsjø, sport shooter (died 2024).
- 3 May – Narve Bjørgo, historian and professor
- 3 May – Inger Pedersen, politician (died 2023).
- 11 May – Nils O. Golten, politician (died 1999)
- 22 May – Hans Olav Tungesvik, politician (died 2017)
- 27 May – Eli Skolmen Ryg, television producer
- 28 May – Ole Klemet Sara, politician (died 2013)
- 8 June – Karin Hafstad, politician (died 2019)
- 9 June – Per Brandtzæg, physician (died 2016)
- 15 June – Reidun Andreassen, politician (died 2026).
- 18 June – Reidar Thomassen, writer (died 2024).

=== July – September ===
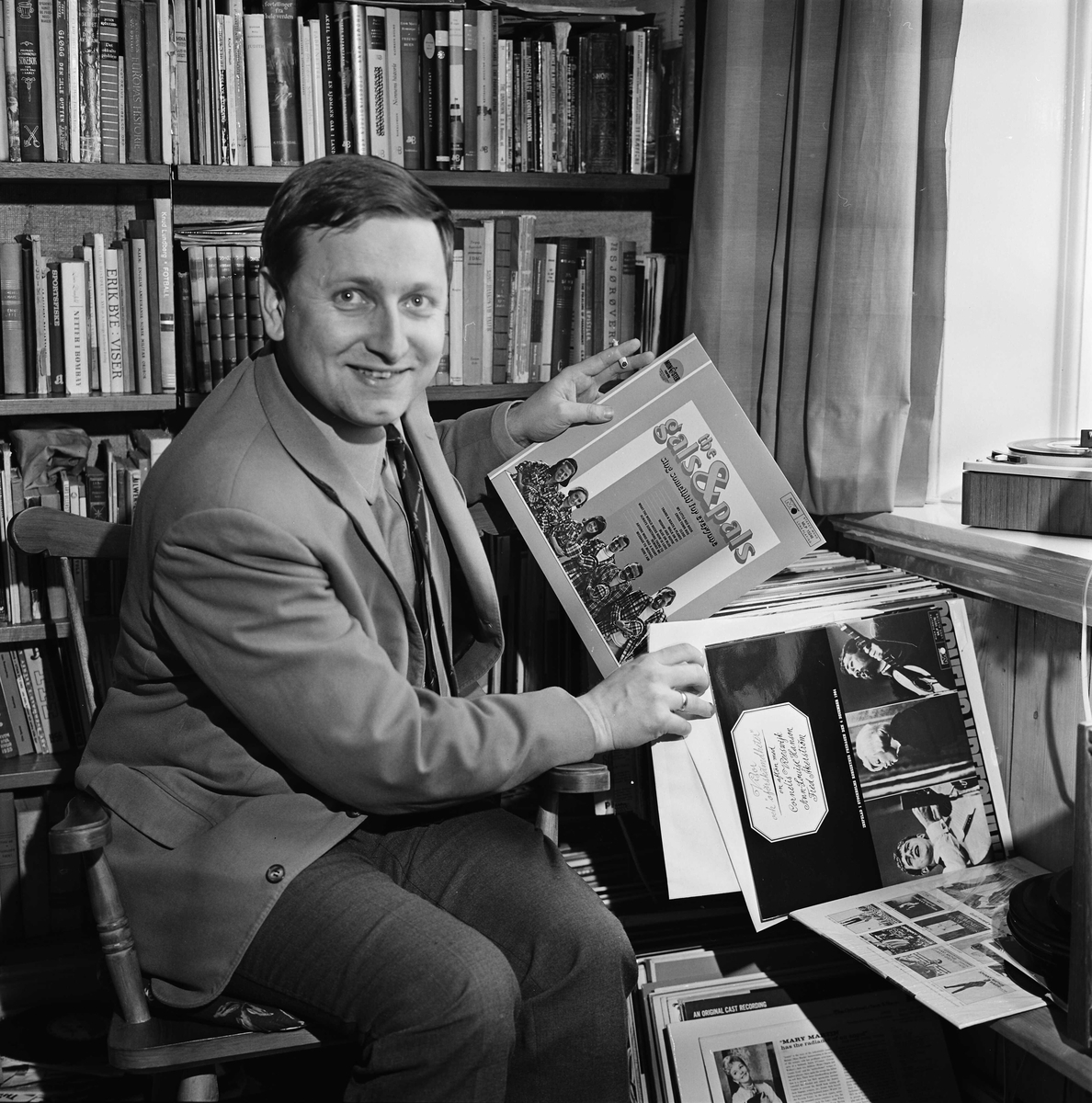
Rolv Wesenlund

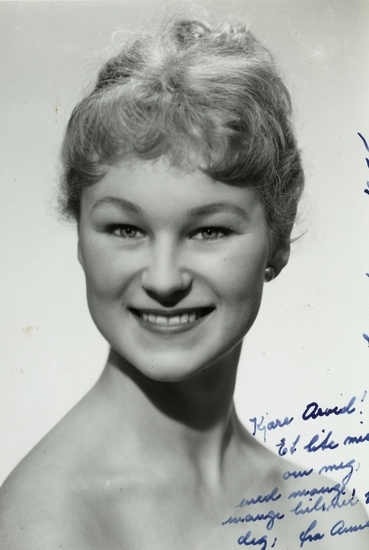
Anne Borg

- 3 July – Baard Owe, actor (d. 2017)
- 10 July – John Herstad, historian.
- 14 July – Egil Børre Johnsen, writer
- 18 July – Sigbjørn Larsen, politician
- 24 July – Finn Kristensen, politician
- 29 July – Rolf Presthus, politician (died 1988)
- 1 August – Asbjørn Larsen, industrial leader (died 2025).
- 28 August – Asbjørn Liland, politician (died 2019)
- 14 September – Harry Danielsen, politician (d. 2011)
- 17 September – Rolv Wesenlund, comedian, singer, musician, writer and actor (died 2013)
- 24 September – Ingvard Sverdrup, politician (died 1997)
- 28 September – Anne Borg, ballet dancer and choreographer (died 2016).

=== October – December ===
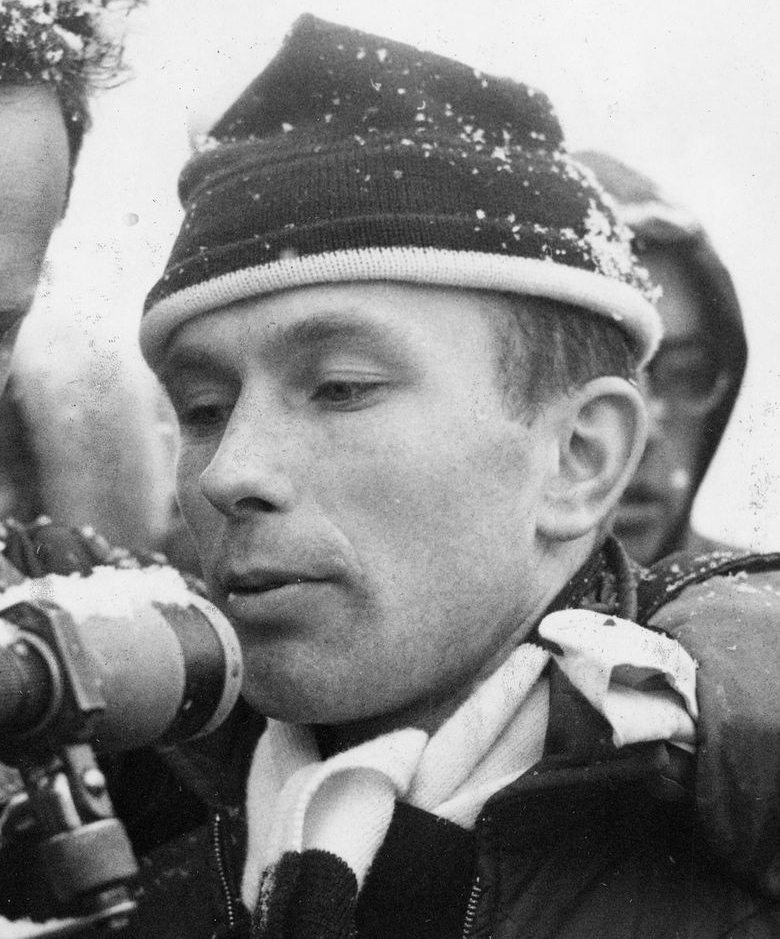
Toralf Engan

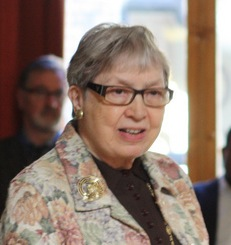
Torild Skard

- 1 October – Toralf Engan, ski jumper
- 4 October – Bjarne Mørk Eidem, politician (died 2022).
- 6 October – Gunnar Mathisen, politician (died 2022).
- 25 October – Arnfinn Nesset, nurse and serial killer
- 14 November – Sven O. Høiby, journalist (died 2007)
- 17 November – Richard Edvardsen, politician
- 23 November – Bjørn Hernæs, politician (died 2024).
- 29 November – Målfrid Grude Flekkøy, psychologist (died 2013)
- 29 November – Torild Skard, psychologist, feminist and politician
- 29 November – Reidun Brusletten, politician
- 10 December – Thor Helland, long-distance runner (died 2021)
- 11 December – Esther Kostøl, trade unionist (died 2023).
- 14 December – Arve Tellefsen, violinist
- 30 December – Fredrik Skagen, writer (died 2017)

== Notable deaths ==
- 17 February – Ole Nikolai Ingebrigtsen Strømme, politician and Minister (born 1876)
- 25 February – Arthur Amundsen, gymnast and Olympic silver medallist (born 1886)
- 27 March – Christian Hansen Wollnick, newspaper editor, jurist and politician (born 1867)
- 19 June – Ole Georg Gjøsteen, educator and politician (born 1854)
- 10 July – Abraham Berge, politician and Minister (born 1851)
- 12 July – Kittel Halvorson, a U.S. Representative from Minnesota (born 1846)
- 30 November – Johan Turi, first Sami author to publish work (born 1854)
- 6 December Anthon B. Nilsen, businessman, politician and author (born 1855)
- 25 December – Ole Østervold, sailor and Olympic gold medallist (born 1872)
- 27 December – Karl Bull, military officer, politician and Minister (born 1860)

=== Full date unknown ===
- Olav Bjørkum, politician (born 1859)
