= 1934 in Norway =

- Centuries: 18th; 19th; 20th; 21st
- Decades: 1910s; 1920s; 1930s; 1940s; 1950s
- See also: List of years in Norway

Events in the year 1934 in Norway.

== Incumbents ==
- Monarch – Haakon VII.
- Prime Minister – Johan Ludwig Mowinckel (Liberal Party)

== Events ==
- 7 April – A major rockfall hit Tafjorden in Møre og Romsdal, creating a 64 m (210 ft) flood wave that destroyed the villages of Tafjord and Fjørå, killing 40 people.
- Municipal and county elections are held throughout the country.
- 12 April and 13 April - Adolf Hitler, Erich Raeder and Werner von Blomberg sailed through western Norway aboard the German Panzerschiff Deutschland sailing through the Sognefjord and Hardangerfjord. The voyage was Adolf Hitler's first journey abroad since becoming Chancellor in January 1933. During the visit Hitler and Blomberg were observed having a lengthy private conversation. Alan Bullock speculated that discussions regarding concerns about Ernst Röhm and the SA may have taken place during the visit. The visit was documented in contemporary Norwegian newspapers including Bergens Tidende.

== Notable births ==
- 7 January – Per Ø. Grimstad, businessperson, diplomat and politician
- 11 January – Egil Johansen, jazz drummer, teacher, composer and arranger (died 1998)
- 10 February – Åse Frogner, textile artist (died 2025).
- 15 February – Tinius Nagell-Erichsen, publisher (died 2007)
- 18 February – Arve Johnsen, industrial executive and politician (died 2023).
- 31 March – Knut Haug, politician
- 8 April – Gerd Søraa, writer and politician (died 2018)
- 8 April – Frans Widerberg, painter and graphic artist (d. 2017).
- 1 May – Mette Janson, journalist (died 2004).
- 18 June – Torbjørn Yggeseth, ski jumper (died 2010)
- 21 June – Bente Børsum, actress
- 29 June – Jarle Bondevik, philologist (died 2016)
- 12 July – Jan Grøndahl, police chief and civil servant (died 2022)
- 13 July – Trond Dolva, judge (died 2022)
- 8 August – Johan Baumann, sports executive (died 2026).
- 14 August – Torhild Johnsen, politician
- 20 August – Hans E. Strand, politician (died 2000)
- 23 August – Leif Frode Onarheim, businessperson and politician (died 2021)
- 25 September – Alfred Oftedal Telhaug, educationalist. (died 2016)
- 29 September – Ragnhild Barland, politician (died 2015)
- 6 October – Odd S. Lovoll, Norwegian-American author, historian and educator
- 9 October – Harald Grønningen, cross country skier, double Olympic gold medallist and World Champion (died 2016)
- 14 October – Magnus Aarbakke, judge
- 20 October – Olav T. Laake, judge and politician
- 26 October – Ingvald Godal, politician (died 2019)
- 27 October – Johan Fredrik Grøgaard, writer (died 2025).
- 3 November – Roar Berthelsen, long jumper (died 1990)
- 5 November – Kjell Hallbing, author of Western books under the pseudonym Louis Masterson (died 2004)
- 6 December – Jacob Birger Natvig, physician, hospital director and medical researcher. (died 2021)
- 27 December – Bjørn Nilsen, poet and journalist (died 2026).
- 29 December – Geirmund Ihle, politician (died 2016)
- 29 December – Turid Iversen, politician

=== Full date unknown ===
- Finn Haldorsen, businessperson

== Notable deaths ==
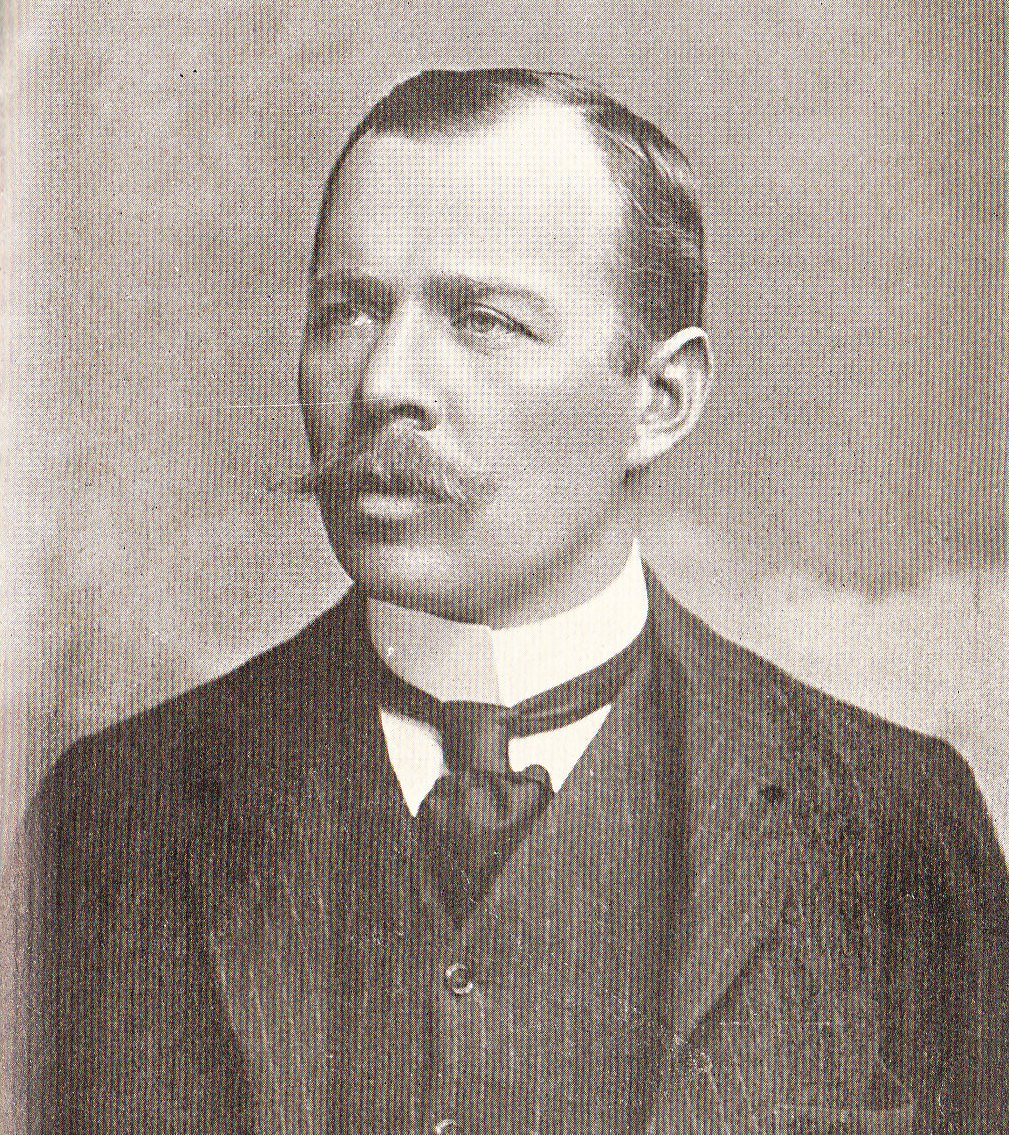
Carsten Borchgrevink

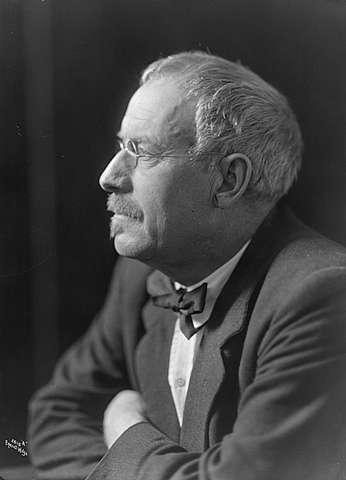
Gudmund Stenersen

- 21 January – Christian Lange Rolfsen, politician and Minister (born 1864)
- 19 February – Ivar Kleiven, local historian and poet (born 1854)
- 21 April – Carsten Borchgrevink, polar explorer (born 1864)
- 29 May – Nicolai Kiær, gymnast and Olympic silver medallist (born 1888)
- 29 May – Christian Bendz Kielland, civil servant (born 1858)
- 12 July – Ole Evinrude, inventor, known for the invention of the first outboard motor with practical commercial application, in America (born 1877)
- 30 July – Rasmus Olai Mortensen, politician and Minister (born 1869)
- 14 October – Fredrikke Mørck, liberal feminist, magazine editor (born 1861).
- 5 November – Hulda Garborg, writer, novelist, playwright, poet, folk dancer and theatre instructor (born 1862)
- 12 November – Jacob Marius Schøning, politician and Minister (born 1856)
- 16 November – Haakon Martin Evjenth, politician (born 1865)
- 12 December – Thorleif Haug, skier and Olympic gold medallist (born 1894)
- 19 December – Sven Elvestad, journalist and author (born 1884)

=== Full date unknown ===
- Peter Collett Solberg, businessperson and politician (born 1866)
