= Aasland =

Aasland is a Norwegian-language surname. Notable people with the surname include:

- Aaslaug Aasland (1890–1962), Norwegian politician
- Ann-Mari Aasland (1915–2008), Norwegian politician
- Arthur J. Aasland (1934–2016), Norwegian businessperson
- Gunnar Aasland (born 1936), Norwegian judge
- Karl Aasland (1918–1982), Norwegian politician
- Lasse Aasland (1926–2001), Norwegian politician
- Øyvind Aasland (born 1967), Norwegian darts player
- Terje Aasland (born 1965), Norwegian politician
- Tora Aasland (born 1942), Norwegian politician
