= Faarlund =

Faarlund is a Norwegian surname. Notable people with the surname include:

- Jan Terje Faarlund (born 1943), Norwegian linguist
- Nils Petter Faarlund (born 1937), Norwegian mountaineer
