= Enger (surname) =

Enger is a Norwegian surname. Notable people with the surname include:

- Anne Enger (born 1949), Norwegian politician
- Asle Enger (1906–2000), Norwegian priest
- Asmund Enger (1881–1966), Norwegian sports shooter
- Bob Enger (born c. 1935), American football player and coach
- Cecilie Enger (born 1963), Norwegian journalist, novelist and children's writer
- Charles Van Enger (1890–1980), American cinematographer
- Einar Enger (born 1950), Norwegian businessman
- Elisabeth Enger (born 1958), Norwegian civil servant
- Elling Enger (1905-1979), Norwegian musician
- Erik Enger (1927–2016), Norwegian physician
- Erling Enger (1899–1990), Norwegian painter
- Gyda Enger (born 1993), Norwegian ski jumper
- Inger S. Enger (born 1948), Norwegian politician
- Ivar Enger (born 1973), Norwegian guitarist
- Leif Enger (born 1961), American author
- Leif Enger (actor) (1900–1977), Norwegian actor
- Mark Enger (1963–2011), American artists
- Ole Enger (actor) (1948–2014), Norwegian actor and businessperson
- Ole Enger (chief executive) (born 1948), Norwegian businessman
- Pål Enger (1967–2024), Norwegian footballer and art thief
- Per S. Enger (1929–2018), Norwegian zoophysiologist
- Richard L. Van Enger (1914–1984), American film editor
- Rolf Enger (born 1960), Norwegian writer
- Sondre Holst Enger (born 1993), Norwegian cyclist
- Thomas Enger (born 1973), Norwegian writer and journalist
- Thorleif Enger (born 1943), Norwegian businessman
