= Bjørn Hansen =

Bjørn Hansen is the name of:

- Bjørn Hansen (journalist) (born 1938), Norwegian journalist
- Bjørn Hansen (footballer) (1939–2018), Norwegian football player and coach
- Bjørn Lidin Hansen (1989–2016), Norwegian footballer
- Bjørn Hansen (soccer)
- Björn Hansen, Swedish sailor
