= Enget (surname) =

Enget is a surname. Notable people with the surname include:

- Ida Elise Enget (born 1989), Norwegian footballer
- Mark Enget, American politician

== See also ==
- Engel (surname)
- Engen (surname)
- Enger (surname)
- Enge (surname)
