= Knut Hauge =

Knut Hauge may refer to:

- Knut Hauge (writer) (1911–1999), Norwegian writer
- Knut Hauge (diplomat) (born 1953), Norwegian diplomat

== See also ==
- Knut Haug (born 1934), Norwegian politician for the Conservative Party
