= Jahre =

Jahre is a surname. Notable people with the surname include:

- Anders Jahre (1891–1982), Norwegian shipping magnate
- Henrik Jahre (born 1937), Norwegian politician
- Jørgen Jahre (1907–1998), Norwegian shipowner and sports official
- Tuulikki Jahre (born 1951), Swedish cyclist

== See also ==
- Mahre
