= Ole Enger =

Ole Enger may refer to:

- Ole Enger (chief executive), Norwegian president and CEO of Renewable Energy Corporation
- Ole Enger (actor) (1948–2014), Norwegian actor and businessman
