= Mahre =

Mahre is a surname. Notable people with the surname include:

- Phil Mahre (born 1957), American alpine skier
- Steve Mahre (born 1957), American alpine skier

== See also ==
- Jahre
- Maher (surname)
- Mahrez
