= Laake =

Laake is a surname. Notable people with the surname include:

- Deborah Laake (1952–2000), American columnist, editor, and newspaper executive
- Kristian Laake (1875–1950), Norwegian military officer
- Olav T. Laake (1934–2024), Norwegian judge and politician
