= Gunnestad =

Gunnestad is a surname. Notable people with the surname include:

- Astrid Gunnestad (1938–2016), Norwegian journalist and radio presenter
- Lars Gunnestad (born 1971), Norwegian motorcycle speedway rider
- Stig-Arne Gunnestad (born 1962), Norwegian curler
