= Kalstad =

Kalstad is a Norwegian surname. Notable people with the surname include:

- Marit Kalstad (1931–2016), Norwegian author
- Ragnhild Vassvik Kalstad (born 1966), Norwegian politician
- Stig Kalstad (born 1973), Norwegian biathlete
