= Kaurin =

Kaurin is a surname. Notable people with the surname include:

- Edvard Kaurin Barth, Norwegian zoologist and photographer
- Jens Matthias Pram Kaurin (1804–1863), Norwegian professor of theology, biblical translator, and Lutheran priest
- Leni Larsen Kaurin (born 1981), Norwegian footballer
