= Hans Stenseth =

- Born: 30 December 1896; Gran Municipality, Oppland
- Origin: Norway
- Died: 18 May 1994 (aged 97) Bergen, Hordaland
- Occupations: Musician, flute teacher
- Instrument: Flute

Hans Stenseth (30 December 1896 – 18 May 1994) was a Norwegian flautist, known as one of the leading in flautists in Norway in his time. He toured extensively and played with the country's leading ensembles.

== Biography ==
Stenseth was born in Gran Municipality and lived from 1936, and died in Bergen. He was organist apprenticed to his father, the organist Johan Stenseth, and attended further studies at Bangs Musikkskole and Musikkonservatoriet i Oslo under V. Aas, M. Lindeman and Arild Sandvold, with flute as the main instrument he joined solo flautist Aksel Andersen at Nationaltheatret and Oslo Filharmoniske Orkester, as teacher. He was flautist at Stavanger city orchestra (1916–18), at Oslo's Opera Comique (1918–21), Casino Opera and Operetteorkester (1921–28). Stenseth was a teacher at the conservatory (until 1936). In 1936 he moved to Bergen where he was solo flutist with Bergen Filharmoniske Orkester until his retirement retiring in 1963. He was also appointed as flute teacher at Bergen Musikkonservatorium (1945–63).

Among his students we find prominent musicians Per Øien, Jan Ingolf Schjøtt, Ørnulf Gulbransen, Ronald Ones, Hallvard Johnsen, Vidar Austvik, and Toralf Tollefsen.
