= Sonja Barth =

Norwegian environmentalist (1923–2016)

Sonja Louise Barth
- Born: Sonja Louise Skoklefald; 21 May 1923; Nesodden, Norway
- Died: 10 September 2016 (aged 93); Oslo, Norway
- Known for: Environmentalism; Norwegian resistance movement
- Spouse: Edvard Kaurin Barth (m. 1945; died 1996)
- Awards: Order of St. Olav (2008)

Sonja Louise Barth (21 May 1923 – 10 September 2016, née Skoklefald) was a Norwegian environmentalist.

During World War II she was active in XU, the secret Norwegian resistance operation whose activities were kept secret until 1988. In 2008 she described her experiences to Lars Otto Wollum, on condition that he publish nothing of them until after her death.

In 2008 she was appointed to the Royal Norwegian Order of Saint Olav. The citation referred to her work in public education and the dissemination of natural and cultural history, and to her work in the Rondane region.

On 14 November 1945 she married Edvard Kaurin Barth (1913–1996), a photographer and zoologist.

== Bibliography ==
- Sonja Barth, Edvard K. Barth and Roald Smestad: "Capture facility in Remdalen", Hemgrenda, Ringebu historielag, volume 15, 1991, pp. 19–30
- Sonja Barth and Edvard K. Barth: "Fangstgravrecken Skjæringfjell-Imsdalsvola and conversation with Mats and Hallvar Huset", Yearbook for the Norwegian Forestry Museum. Forestry, hunting and fishing, No. 13, 1990–1992, pp. 220–232
- Sonja Barth and Edvard K. Barth: "Catch historical reports", Elverum: Norwegian Forestry Museum, 1989
- Sonja Barth and Edvard K. Barth: "Fangstgraver i et trollsk skoglandskap", Statsskog: company newspaper for statens skoger, vol. 25, no. 4, 1989, pp. 9–12
- Sonja Barth and Edvard K. Barth: "Fangstgraves in Engerdal's western mountains", in the Norwegian Forestry Museum. Yearbook, No. 11, 1986, pp. 189–208
- Sonja Barth and Edvard K. Barth: "Falconer tufts and falconry in Southern Norway", in the Norwegian Forestry Museum. Yearbook, No. 10, 1984, pp. 219–251
- Sonja Barth and Edvard K. Barth: "Reindeer trapping facility on Storøa in Engerdal", in the Norwegian Forestry Museum. Yearbook, No. 9, 1981, pp. 260–271
- Sonja Barth: Andereiret, with Edvard K. Barth, Oslo: Cappelen, 1948
