= Bjarne Hurlen =

Norwegian military personnel (1915–1998)

- Born: 13 October 1915; Ålesund, Norway
- Died: 19 November 1998 (aged 83); Kongsberg
- Occupations: Military officer Engineer; Industrialist
- Known for: CEO of Kongsberg Våpenfabrikk; CEO of Raufoss Ammunisjonsfabrikker

Bjarne Hurlen (13 October 1915 – 19 November 1998) was a Norwegian military officer, engineer and industrialist.

He was born in Ålesund to Johan B. Hurlen and Emma Hildre. In 1943 he married Oline Oseasen Midthassel.

Hurlen was chief executive of Kongsberg Våpenfabrikk from 1956 to 1975, and from 1962 to 1972 also chief executive of Raufoss Ammunisjonsfabrikker. He was decorated Knight, First Class of the Order of St. Olav in 1964, and was a Knight of the Swedish Order of Vasa.

Business positions
Preceded by Leif Lyche	Chief executive of Kongsberg Våpenfabrikk; 1956–1975	Succeeded by Arthur J. Aasland
