= Arne Malmedal =

Norwegian painter, illustrator and printmaker (1937–2017)

- Born: 9 January 1937; Molde, Norway
- Died: 4 October 2018 (aged 81); Asker Municipality
- Education: Norwegian National Academy of Craft and Art Industry
- Occupations: Painter, illustrator and printmaker

Arne Malmedal (9 January 1937 – 4 October 2018) was a Norwegian painter, illustrator and printmaker.

== Personal life ==
Malmedal was born in Molde on 9 January 1937, a son of Ole Malmedal and Hilde Haavardsholm.

== Career ==
Malmedal studied at the Norwegian National Academy of Craft and Art Industry from 1956 to 1960. His works are typically abstract art, with simple motives and pure colours. He also lectured at the Norwegian National Academy of Fine Arts. His works at the National Museum of Norway include Speiling, fjordsiden (1967), Skyer (1969), Vestland (1969), Skrivemaskin på bord (1977), and Reflekser (1969). A "perfectly white canvas" by Malmedal is included in the Tangen collection at Kunstsilo in Kristiansand.

Malmedal died in Asker Municipality on 4 October 2018, at the age of 81.
