= Rhyming book titles =

Norwegian literary trend

Rhyming book titles was a fad in Norwegian literature in the late 2010s.

The fad began after the German author Giulia Enders' book Gut was translated into Norwegian as Sjarmen med tarmen ("The Charm of the Bowels") in 2015 and became a bestseller. Its original German title featured a similar rhyme, Darm mit Charme.

Kaja Nordengen became the first Norwegian to capitalize on the trend when she issued her own book about a body part, Hjernen er stjernen (lit. "The Brain is the Star", translated as "Your Superstar Brain") on Cappelen Damm in 2016. The book sold very well, being printed in a circulation of 100,000. "Rhyming book titles seem to be the key to medical popular enlightenment", journalist Øystein Aldridge wrote upon the release of another Norwegian book with a rhyming title, this time about the female genitalia, Gleden med skjeden ("The Joy of the Vagina"). Appearing in 2017, written by Nina Brochmann and Ellen Støkken Dahl and published by Aschehoug, it too became a major bestseller.

In early 2018, two male physicians Kaveh Rashidi and Jonas Kinge Bergland published Manus om anus ("Manuscript About the Anus"), this time on Gyldendal, the last of Norway's three major publishing houses. The psychology pundit Peder Kjøs commented the continuation of the naming trend in VG: "When the book has a disarming title, you can leave it lying on the living-room table. [...] The humor today makes the book into something you can buy". In late 2018, physician Wasim Zahid followed with the book Hjerte for hjertet ("A Heart for the Heart") on Gyldendal. When yet another rhyming title appeared, this time a book published by Kagge and detailing the human skin, Huden er guden ("The Skin is God") by Jon Anders Halvorsen, the book reviewer in Sykepleien commented: "Kagge Publishing House has trawled the rhyme dictionary and found a word that rhymes with a hitherto undescribed body part in the line of popular science books". She called the rationale for a rhyming title "razor-thin". Helene Uri made similar comments; the rhymes had become contrived.

The rhyming trend also extended beyond popularized anatomy. In 2020, the book Knytta til hytta ("Connected to the Cabin") by Magnus Helgerud was also connected explicitly to the rhyming trend, despite it being about Norway's holiday cottage culture. Coming up with new rhyming titles for plausible, but non-existing books also became a running joke in Norwegian newspapers and social media at the time. The phenomenon was also discussed in the segment Kropp er pop during the Norwegian Prose Festival of 2018.

When Marte Roa Syvertsen published a new book about the human brain in 2021, the book title did not contain a rhyme, with Syvertsen commenting: "I think it's probably time to stop making titles that rhyme".
