= Dag Gundersen =

Dag Gundersen (15 January 1928 – 2 February 2016) was a Norwegian linguist and lexicographer, dictionary editor and professor. Born in Ringsaker Municipality, he was a professor at the University of Oslo from 1985 to 1997 and was the editor of several dictionaries of the Norwegian language. He was a member of the Norwegian Language Council from 1990 to 2000, and since 1993 a member of Norwegian Academy of Science and Letters.
