= Leif Mæhle =

Norwegian literary researcher (1927–2016)

- Born: 17 May 1927; Sunndal Municipality, Norway
- Died: 1 September 2016 (aged 89)
- Occupation: Literary scholar

Leif Magnar Mæhle (17 May 1927 – 1 September 2016) was a Norwegian literary researcher. He was born in Sunndal Municipality. He edited the annual publication Norsk litterær årbok from its first edition in 1966 to 1988. His thesis from 1969 was a treatment of Olav Aukrust. Following his doctorate degree, he was appointed professor of Scandinavian literature at the University of Oslo from 1969 to 1997. He was a member of the Language Council of Norway from 1972 to 1988, and chaired the board of the publishing house Det Norske Samlaget from 1972 to 1981. In 1975 he was elected member of the Norwegian Academy of Science and Letters, and served as secretary general from 1986 to 1997.
