= Nicolaus Zwetnow =

Norwegian physician and sports shooter (1929–2016)

Nic Zwetnow
Personal information
- Born: 28 May 1929 Berlin, Germany
- Died: 18 January 2016 (aged 86)

Sport
- Sport: Sports shooting

Nicolaus Zwetnow (28 May 1929 – 18 January 2016) was a Norwegian sports shooter. He competed at the 1960 Summer Olympics and the 1964 Summer Olympics.

After taking the cand.med. degree at the University of Oslo in 1953, he proceeded with the dr.med. degree in Gothenburg in 1970, and was declared a specialist in neurosurgery in the same year. He worked at the Sahlgrenska and Karolinska hospitals in Sweden, and from 1979 to his retirement in 1999 he was a professor of medicine at the University of Oslo. He was also a skilled balalaika player, attending the Norwegian Academy of Music, and a polyglot capable in ten languages.
