= Mahrez =

Mahrez is both a surname and a given name. Notable people with the name include:

- Brahim Mahrez (born 1972), French-Algerian singer
- Riyad Mahrez (born 1991), Algerian footballer
- Sidi Mahrez (951–1022), Tunisian jurist
- Mahrez Mebarek (born 1985), Algerian swimmer
