= Knut Boye =

Norwegian academic

Knut Boye (12 January 1937 – 21 July 2008) was a Norwegian academic, within the field of business administration.

He was born in Arendal. He graduated with the siv.øk. degree from the Norwegian School of Economics in 1963, and after becoming a certified mercantile teacher there in 1966, he spent the better part of his career there, lastly as an associate professor. Boye was first and foremost known as a lecturer and writer of textbooks in several fields of economics: finance, investment, acquisitions, business administration and personal economy. He penned 25 books, many of which were reissued, and edited the periodical Praktisk økonomi og finans from 1986. He died from cancer.
