= Martha Seim Valeur =

Norwegian politician

Martha Seim Valeur (20 March 1923 – 5 May 2016) was a Norwegian politician for the Conservative Party.

She served as a deputy representative in the Parliament of Norway from Oslo during the term 1993–1997.

Among other posts, she chaired the board of the Norwegian State Housing Bank from 1982 to 1985, and continued as a board member until 1990. She was deputy leader of the Norway's Contact Committee for Immigrants and the Authorities between 1984 and 1986.
