= Holger Ursin =

Norwegian physician and psychologist (1934–2016)

Holger Thorvald Ursin
- Born: 11 February 1934; Oslo, Norway
- Died: 13 August 2016 (aged 82)
- Occupations: Physician; Psychologist

Holger Thorvald Ursin (11 February 1934 – 13 August 2016) was a Norwegian physician and psychologist.

He was born in Oslo. He lectured at the University of Bergen from 1967, and was appointed professor from 1974. His research interests focused on neurophysiological mechanisms related to behavior and coping with stress.

He was decorated Knight, First Class of the Order of St. Olav in 2008.
