= Gunnar Mathisen =

Norwegian politician (1936–2022)

Member of the Norwegian Parliament
- Constituency: Finnmark

Personal details
- Born: 6 October 1936
- Died: 14 July 2022 (aged 85)
- Party: Labour Party
- Occupation: Politician

Gunnar Mathisen (6 October 1936 – 14 July 2022) was a Norwegian politician for the Labour Party. He was elected deputy representative to the Storting for the period 1992–1997 from the constituency of Finnmark. From 1996 to 1997 he met regularly in the Storting replacing Karl Eirik Schjøtt-Pedersen who was Minister of Fisheries. In the Storting, he was a member of the Standing Committee on Family, Cultural Affairs and Administration from 1996 to 1997.

Mathisen died on 14 July 2022.
