= Bjørn Rønningen =

Norwegian children's writer (born 1937)

Bjørn Rønningen (born 31 December 1937) is a Norwegian children's writer.

He was born in Bærum, and made his literary debut in 1971. He is best known for his series about Fru Pigalopp, as well as Jul i Skomakergata.
