= Christian Berg-Nielsen =

Norwegian diplomat

Christian Berg-Nielsen (14 December 1920 – 22 February 2016) was a Norwegian diplomat.

He was born in Bergen, and has the siv.øk. degree in economics. He was hired in the Ministry of Foreign Affairs in 1946, and served as the Norwegian ambassador to Nigeria from 1964 to 1967, Poland from 1967 to 1972, Japan from 1972 to 1976, Finland from 1976 to 1982 and the European Community (stationed in Brussels) from 1982 to 1988.
