= Asbjørn Larsen =

Norwegian economist and industrial leader

- Born: 1 August 1936; Porsgrunn, Norway
- Died: 26 January 2025 (aged 88)
- Education: Norwegian School of Economics
- Occupation: Industrial leader
- Awards: Order of St. Olav

Asbjørn Larsen (1 August 1936 – 26 January 2025) was a Norwegian economist and industrial leader. He was chief executive of the petroleum company Saga Petroleum from 1979 to 1998.

== Life and career ==
Larsen was born in Porsgrunn on 1 August 1936, a son of Johan Fredrik Larsen and Mette Kirstine Jensen. He was married twice, first to Marie-Louise Engebretsen, from 1960 to 1979, and from 1999 to Elin Barstad.

He graduated from the Norwegian School of Economics in 1960. He was assigned with the Ministry of Foreign Affairs from 1961 to 1965, and the Norwegian Shipowners' Association from 1966 to 1973. He was CEO of the petroleum company Saga Petroleum from 1979 to 1998. He became a member of the Norwegian Academy of Technological Sciences from 1993.

He was decorated Knight, First Class of the Order of St. Olav in 1993.

Larsen died on 26 January 2025, at the age of 88.
