= Grete Randsborg Jenseg =

Norwegian writer (1937–2025)

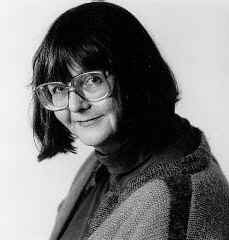
- Born: 21 May 1937
- Died: 19 June 2025 (aged 88)
- Occupations: Actress, children's writer, playwright and dramatist

Grete Randsborg Jenseg (21 May 1937 – 19 June 2025) was a Norwegian actress, children's writer and playwright.

== Life and career ==
Jenseg was born on 21 May 1937. Educated as actress, she made her stage debut at Trøndelag Teater in 1962, and worked at various theatres the next ten years. From 1976 to 1993 she was appointed at the Ministry of Children and Families, and from 1993 she was a full-time writer and dramatist.

She made her literary debut in 1987, with the children's book Bakkestart, Valentino!. She followed up with Frossen fugl, a book for young adults, in 1988, and the children's book Veien til sommeren, Valentino! in 1999.

Further books for children or young adults are Nesten nær deg (1990), Kjære Ingen! (1991), Engelen Roy (1993), and Faren til Lukas (1994). As screenwriter she wrote the scripts for the television series Sommerbåten and the series Markjordbærbarna.

In 1996 she wrote the novel Det aller fineste. In 1998 she wrote two books for the television series Lillys butikk, and in 2009 script for the television series Johannas jul. She wrote the children's book series on Fabel Jakob starting from 2004. The children's book Pippi, snart tretten came in 2011.

Jenseg died on 19 June 2025, at the age of 88.
