= Turid Iversen =

Norwegian politician (1934–2026)

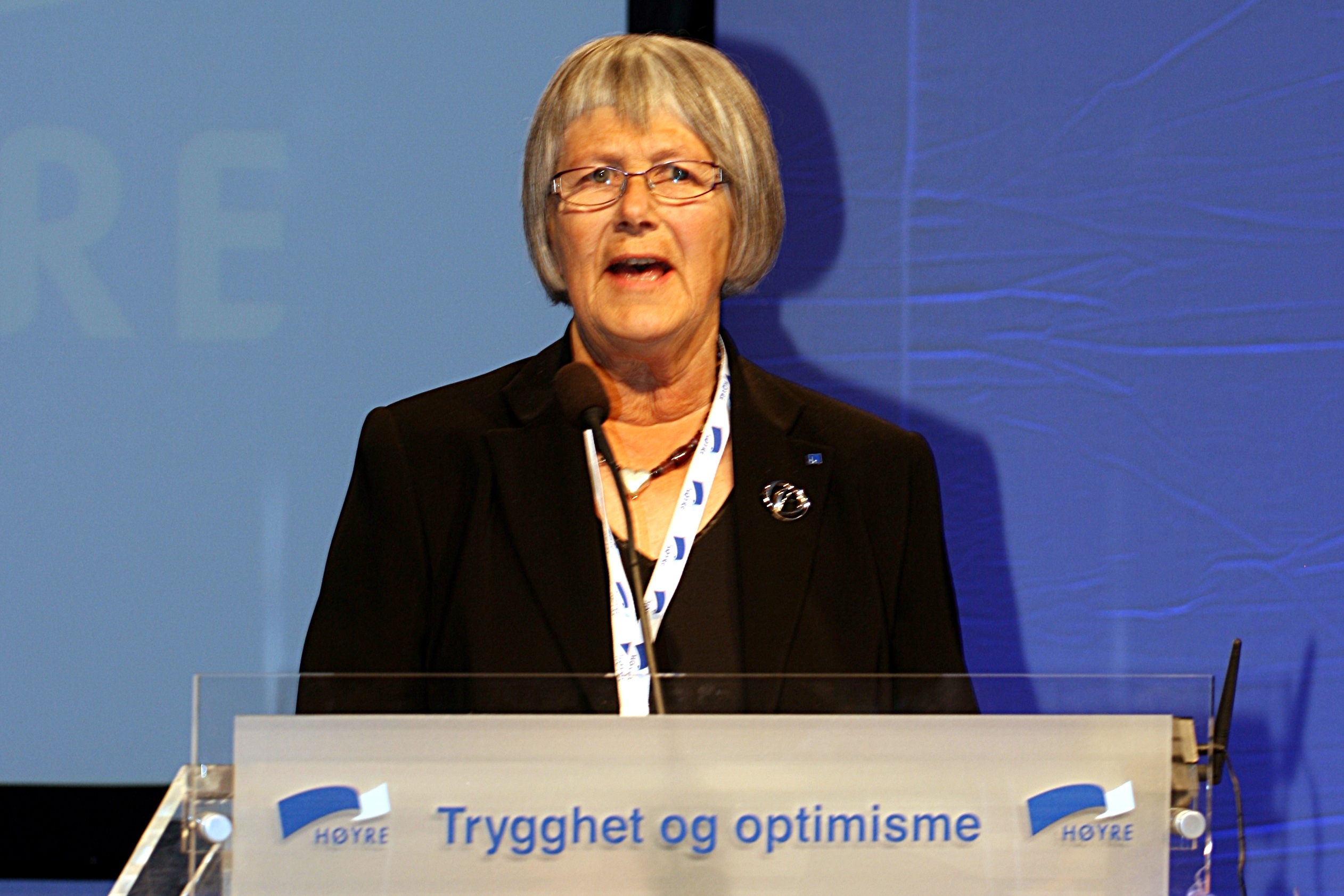
Turid Wickstrand Iversen

Turid Wickstrand Iversen (29 December 1934 – 27 July 2026) was a Norwegian politician for the Conservative Party. She served as a deputy representative to the Norwegian Parliament from Buskerud during the term 1993–1997. On the local level, Iversen was a mayor of Drammen and was succeeded by Labour politician Lise Christoffersen. Iversen died on 27 July 2026, at the age of 91.
