= Even Hansen (footballer) =

Norwegian footballer (1923-2016)

Even Hansen (9 June 1923 – 5 March 2016) was a Norwegian footballer.

He played for Storm BK before playing for Odds BK from 1952 to 1958. He was also capped once for Norway.
