= Jan Nilsen =

Norwegian footballer (1937-2016)

Personal information
- Date of birth: 6 August 1937
- Date of death: 3 September 2016 (aged 79)
- Position: Wing half

Senior career*
Years	Team	Apps	(Gls)
1959–1962	Lisleby		
1964	Fredrikstad		
1966	Lisleby		

International career
1960	Norway	1	(0)
- * Club domestic league appearances and goals

Jan Nilsen (6 August 1937 – 3 September 2016) was a Norwegian footballer who played as a wing half for Lisleby, Fredrikstad, and the national team.

Nilsen played one match for Norway's national team, coming on as a substitute for Arne Legernes in a friendly against Iceland on 9 June 1960.
