= Trond Dolva =

Norwegian judge (1934–2022)

Trond Dolva (13 July 1934 – 11 December 2022) was a Norwegian judge.

He was born in Kongsberg. He worked as a sub-director in the Ministry of Justice and the Police from 1976, as a presiding judge in Eidsivating Court of Appeal from 1980 and a Supreme Court Justice from 1984 to 2004.

Taking up residence in Asker, he was a local scouting leader there. Married with three children, he died at age 88.
