= Bodolf Hareide =

Norwegian politician (born 1937)

Bodolf Hareide (born 1 December 1937 in Hareid Municipality) is a Norwegian politician for the Conservative Party.

He served as a deputy representative to the Norwegian Parliament from Møre og Romsdal during the term 1973–1977. In total he met during 19 days of parliamentary session.
