= Arne Haaland =

Norwegian chemist (1936–2023)

Arne Haaland (15 February 1936 – 13 October 2023) was a Norwegian chemist.

Haaland received his PhD in philosophy from the University of Oslo in 1969 and was an associate professor in chemistry at the University of Oslo from 1964 to 1984, and then a professor until his retirement. He was a fellow of the Norwegian Academy of Science and Letters.

Haaland ran a laboratory for gas electron diffraction. He, his co-workers and colleagues determined the structures of umpteen important chemical compounds in the gas phase. His main field of research was the organometallic compounds.

The list of such structure determinations includes the controversially debated beryllocene, dibenzene chromium, ferrocene, the structure of the phosphorus oxides P_{4}O_{10} and P_{4}O_{9}, trimethylamuminium and its adducts with NMe_{3}, and the first stable silylene.

Haaland was the author of many contributions on chemical bonding, in particular the dative bond and metallocenes.
