= Anfin Skaaheim =

Norwegian missionary leader

- Born: 7 July 1939; Torvikbukt, Norway
- Died: 27 June 2016 (aged 76)
- Occupation: Missionary leader

Anfin Skaaheim (7 July 1939 – 27 June 2016) was a Norwegian missionary leader.

Skaaheim was born in Torvikbukt in Gjemnes Municipality. He graduated as cand.theol. from the MF Norwegian School of Theology. He was appointed Secretary General for the Norwegian Christian Student and School Association from 1975 to 1987, for Det norske lutherske Indremisjonsselskap from 1987 to 2000, and for Normisjon from 2001 to 2003.
