= Magnus Ulleland =

Norwegian philologist (1929–2016)

- Born: 10 September 1929; Svanøya, Norway
- Died: 7 March 2016 (aged 86); Oslo
- Occupation: Philologist
- Awards: Order of Merit of the Italian Republic

Magnus Ulleland (10 September 1929 – 7 March 2016) was a Norwegian philologist.

== Biography ==
Ulleland was born on the island of Svanøya in Bru Municipality (now part of Kinn Municipality). He was appointed professor at the University of Oslo from 1974 to 1976. He was a member of the Norwegian Academy of Science and Letters. Among his works are several translations from Italian language into Nynorsk, and he was decorated with the Order of Merit of the Italian Republic in 1999.
