= Reidar Thomassen =

Norwegian writer (1936–2024)

Reidar Thomassen (18 June 1936 – 13 February 2024), known by the pseudonym Richard Macker, was a Norwegian writer.

== Biography ==
Reidar Thomassen was born in Harstad as a son of Lieutenant Colonel Haakon Ivar Thomassen (1895–1982) and nurse Edith Mack (1905–94). The family also lived in Tromsø and Narvik in Thomassen's youth. From 1964 to 1979 he was married to teacher Inger Sofie Lund. He resided in Bærum Municipality.

Thomassen finished his secondary education in Narvik in 1956, took military training in Harstad and studied at the University of Oslo. He graduated with the cand.real. degree in geography in 1964. He worked as az teacher from 1965 to 1972 and editor from 1972 to 1985, among others for the magazine Teknisk Presse. In 1985 he took up writing full-time.

His debut novel was Konfrontasjonen (1969). Other memorable novels include Den tredje utvei (1970), Seminaret (1976) and Nina Ewert (2000). As a crime writer he used the pseudonym Richard Macker; his crime debut was Mange om liket (1974). He has also written hundreds of crime short stories, and in 2003 he became the first Norwegian contributor to Ellery Queen's Mystery Magazine. He was the screenwriter for the three television series Farlig yrke (1976), Solospill (1977) and Saken Ruth Vang (1981). He wrote one children's book and two textbooks on leadership.

Thomassen was also an active javelin thrower. His club was IL Tyrving, and his personal best throw as a young athlete was 63.31 metres in 1959.

Thomassen died on 13 February 2024, at the age of 87.
