= Gullow Gjeseth =

Norwegian military officer (1937–2017)

- Born: 7 May 1937; Nærøy Municipality, Norway
- Died: 18 January 2017 (aged 79); Bærum Municipality, Norway
- Education: Norwegian Military Academy
- Occupations: Army officer Non-fiction writer Journal editor

Gullow Gjeseth (7 May 1937 – 18 January 2017) was a Norwegian military officer.

Gjeseth was born in Nærøy Municipality, and graduated from the Norwegian Military Academy in 1959.

He served as officer in the Hans Majestet Kongens Garde, and was chief of staff at the 6th Division from 1982 to 1985. From 1986 to 1990 he headed the information department of the Norwegian High Command. From 1990 he was commander of the land-based military forces in Norway, and from 1994 he served as director of the Norwegian Defence University College. At the time of his retirement he held the rank of major general.

From 1996 to 2006 he edited the journal Norsk Militært Tidsskrift. He was also a researcher at the Norwegian Institute for Defence Studies, and he chaired the investigation committee of the Lillehammer affair (1998–2000). His books include Allianseforsvar i endring: 1970–2000 (2004; jointly with Jacob Børresen and Rolf Tamnes, as volume V in the five-volume series Norges forsvarshistorie), further Hæren i omveltning 1990–2005 from 2008, and Landforsvarets krigsplaner under den kalde krigen from 2011.

He resided at Eiksmarka.
