= Asbjørn Liland =

Norwegian politician (1936–2019)

Asbjørn Liland (28 August 1936 – 20 October 2019) was a Norwegian politician for the Liberal Party.

Hailing from Gjerpen Municipality, he was a teacher, led the Open University in Trøndelag, and was the secretary-general of the Liberal Party from 1970 to 1980. He served as a deputy representative to the Parliament of Norway from Sør-Trøndelag during the term 1965–1969. He met during 1 day of parliamentary session.
