= Aslaug Fadum =

Norwegian politician

Aslaug Fadum (17 August 1925 – 13 November 2016) was a Norwegian politician for the Centre Party.

She was born in Sem as a daughter of Olgar Olsen (1897–1939) and housewife Lilly Larsen (1900–1985). After middle school she spent most of her career as a farmer's housewife.

She was a member of Sem school board from 1967 to 1971 and the municipal council from 1971 to 1975. She was elected to the Parliament of Norway from Vestfold in 1973, and served one term. She was the secretary of the Standing Committee on Social Affairs and member of the Election Committee.

She was a central board member of the Centre Party from 1979 to 1983. She was a board member of Vestfold Fylkesmuseum from 1971 to 1973 and Den norske stats oljeselskap from 1982 to 1988, of the council in Vinmonopolet from 1974 to 1977, the corporate council of Norsk Olje from 1982 to 1985, the supervisory council of Gjensidige Liv from 1977 to 1997, Den norske Creditbank from 1978 to 1990 and Gjensidige Skade from 1987 to 1990, the control committee of Den norske Creditbank from 1978 to 1990 and Gjensidige from 1990 to 2000, and the electoral committee of Gjensidige from 1990 to 1997. She was also a board member of the Norwegian National Women's Council from 1979 to 1981 and the county branch of the Norwegian Agrarian Association from 1971 to 1973.
