= Ole Kristian Grimnes =

Norwegian historian

Ole Kristian Grimnes (born 4 January 1937, in Tromsø) is a Norwegian historian.

He was a professor in modern history at the University of Oslo, and is currently professor emeritus at the same university.

In particular he has worked with the periods 1890–1905 and 1940–1945 in Norwegian history.

He is a member of the Norwegian Academy of Science and Letters.
