= Johan Stølan =

Norwegian politician

Johan Stølan (30 March 1939 – 24 October 2016) was a Norwegian politician for the Labour Party.

He served as a deputy representative in the Norwegian Parliament from Sør-Trøndelag during the terms 1977–1981, 1981–1985 and 1985–1989.

On the local level Stølan was mayor of Hemne Municipality from 1987 to 2003. He died at the age of 77.
