= Sigbjørn Ravnåsen =

Norwegian politician (1941–2016)

Sigbjørn Ravnåsen (26 August 1941 – 11 August 2016) was a Norwegian researcher, principal and politician for the Christian Democratic Party.

He was born in Herefoss as a son of a mine labourer. After Kristiansand Teacher's College between 1959 and 1963 he worked as a teacher in Flå and Indre Arna between 1964 and 1970. He also studied one year at the Norwegian Central School of Gymnastics and two years at NLA University College. From 1970 to 1998 he was a school principal in Sauherad.

Ravnåsen chaired Sauherad Christian Democratic Party from 1978 to 1983 and Telemark Christian Democratic Party from 1986 to 1994 after three years as deputy leader. He was never an elected local politician, but chaired Sauherad's cultural council from 1981 to 1982. He served as a deputy representative to the Parliament of Norway from Telemark during the terms 1989–1993 and 1993–1997. From 1989 to 1990 he met as a regular representative, covering for Solveig Sollie who served in Syse's Cabinet. He was a member of the Standing Committee on Agriculture, and also party whip. In total he met during 1 year and 183 days of parliamentary session.

In 1998 Ravnåsen was hired by Telemarksforsking to head a research project on the ethics of lay preacher and businessman Hans Nielsen Hauge. He released the book Ånd og hånd: Hans Nielsen Hauges etikk for ledelse og næringsliv in 2002. The book was translated into English, French and Estonian, and came in a revised edition in 2015. After concluding the project, Ravnåsen continued at Telemarksforskning until 2005, and became managing director of the Hauge Institute in Kristiansand in 2006. He remained so until he was struck by aggressive cancer and died in 2016.

Ravnåsen was married and had four children, several grandchildren and great-grandchildren. He was also active in Normisjon.
