= Frans Widerberg =

Norwegian painter and graphic artist (1934–2017)

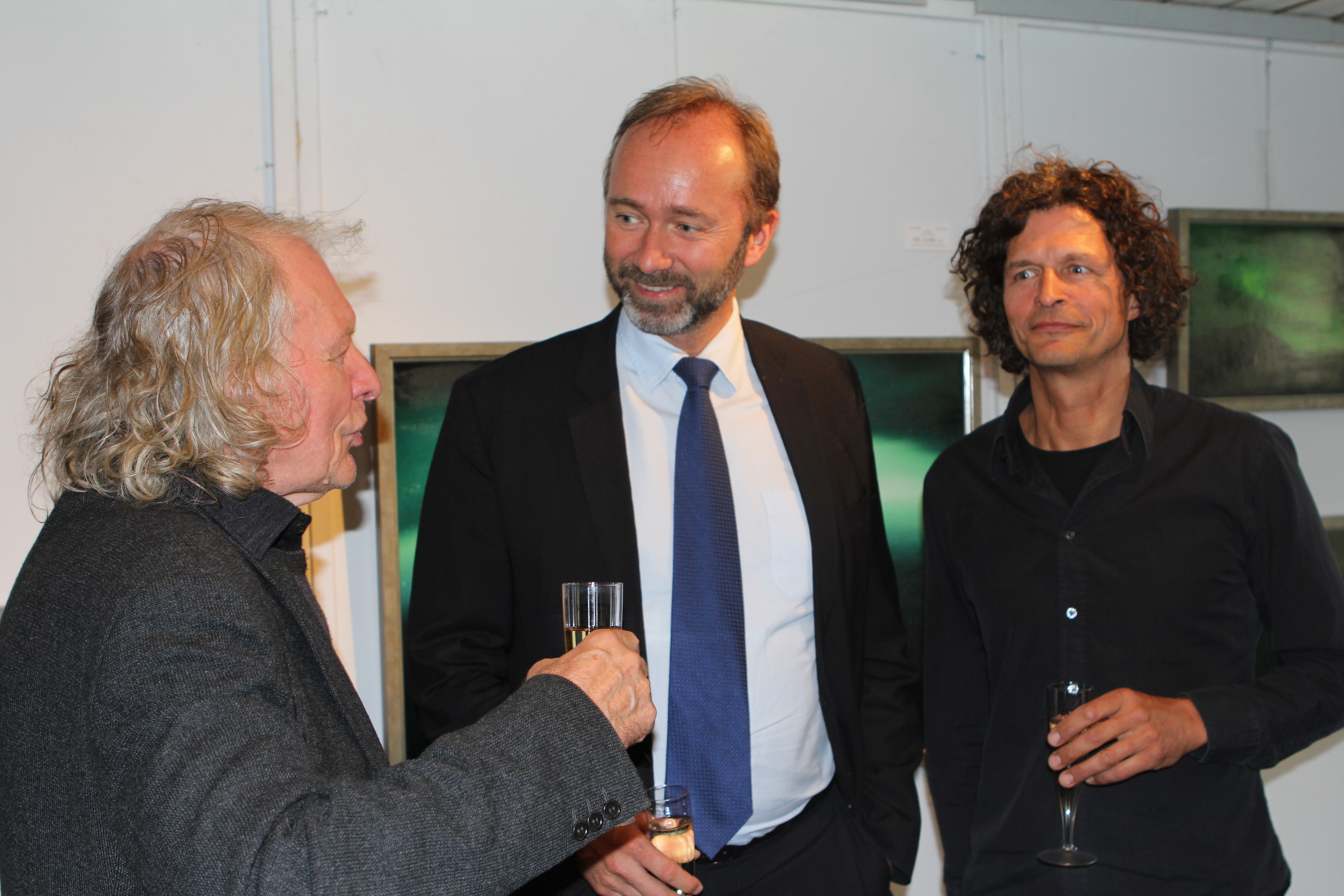
- Widerberg (left) in 2012
- Born: 8 April 1934; Oslo, Norway
- Died: 7 April 2017 (aged 82)
- Occupations: Painter and graphic artist

Frans Widerberg (8 April 1934 – 7 April 2017) was a Norwegian painter and graphic artist.

Widerberg was born in Oslo to Nicolai Magnus Widerberg and Ingrid Christine Blom. He made his exhibition debut in Oslo in 1963. Among his works is the woodcut Hieronymus from 1962 and De usynlige from 1979, both at the National Gallery of Norway. He was an exhibitor at the Bergen International Festival, and represented Norway at the Venice Biennale.

Widerberg died at his home on 7 April 2017 after a short illness, one day before his 83rd birthday.
