= Finn-Erik Vinje =

Norwegian philologist (1936–2026)

- Born: 6 March 1936; Oslo, Norway
- Died: 18 March 2026 (aged 90)
- Occupation: Philologist
- Employer(s): University of Trondheim; University of Oslo

Finn-Erik Vinje (6 March 1936 – 18 March 2026) was a Norwegian philologist.

== Life and career ==
Born in Oslo on 6 March 1936, Vinje was a professor at the University of Trondheim from 1971 to 1975, and at the University of Oslo from 1975 to 2006. He was a language consultant for the Norwegian Broadcasting Corporation from 1971 to 1992. He wrote several books on language-related questions.

Vinje died in Bærum on 18 March 2026, at the age of 90.

== Selected works ==
- Moderne norsk (1968).
- Ord om ord (1973).
- Et språk i utvikling (1973, 1978).
- Norsk i embets medfør (1977, 1986).
- Norsk språk. Tilstand og vekst (1979).
- På talefot med språket (1982).
- Rent ut sagt (1988).
- Ord om annet (1993).
- Frihetens palladium – i språklig belysning : om språket i Grunnloven (2002).
- Norsk grammatikk (2005).
- Ut med språket (2005).
- Riktig norsk (2014).
