= Jarle Bondevik =

Norwegian philologist

- Born: 29 June 1934; Sogndal Municipality, Norway
- Died: 4 April 2016 (aged 81)
- Education: University of Bergen
- Occupation: Philologist

Jarle Bondevik (29 June 1934 – 4 April 2016) was a Norwegian philologist.

He was born in Sogndal Municipality, and took the a cand.philol. degree at the University of Bergen in 1961. He worked as a lecturer at Aarhus University from 1961 to 1963, and at Bergen Teacher's College from 1963 to 1972. In 1972 he was appointed as a lecturer at the University of Bergen. The dr.philos. degree from the University of Bergen institution followed in 1988, and in 1993 he became a professor. From 1991 to 1999 he was also an assisting professor at Volda University College.

He is a former member of the Norwegian Language Council, and together with Oddvar Nes and Terje Aarset he has published nine volumes of unreleased material from Ivar Aasen.

He resided in Søreidgrend. He died in April 2016.
