= Arthur J. Aasland =

Norwegian businessperson (1934-2016)

- Born: 1934
- Died: 2016 (aged 81–82)
- Occupation: Businessman

Arthur Johannes Aasland (22 April 1934 – 17 February 2016) was a Norwegian businessperson.

He grew up in Luksefjell, and took his education at the Norwegian Military Academy. After serving in the armed forces, and reaching the rank of major, he was hired in the company Ing. F. Selmer in 1963. He became director of personnel here in 1967, before working as chief executive of Kongsberg Våpenfabrikk from 1975 to 1978 and Løvenskiold Vækerø from 1979 to 1985. He then ran his own consulting firm Aasland Management, and through that served on the board of 40 companies.

Business positions
Preceded by Bjarne Hurlen	Chief executive of Kongsberg Våpenfabrikk; 1975–1978	Succeeded by Rolf Qvenild
