= Marit Kalstad =

Norwegian writer (1931–2016)

Marit Kalstad, née Hovengen (30 September 1931 – 25 November 2016) was a Norwegian children's and young adult fiction writer. Week-end blues earned her the Damm Award of 1973.

== Career ==
She was a journalist in Gudbrandsdølen/Lillehammer Tilskuer in her early career. Her literary debut came in 1961 at the age of 30. After her first book, which was published by Gyldendal, she forwarded a manuscript to the publishing house Damm, which became her subsequent publisher. Kalstad was active during the 1960s and 1970s, releasing the following books:

- Vikar søkes (1961)
- Mona og Helge (1962)
- Drømmeringen (1964)
- Det tomme huset (1965)
- Åmund (1967)
- Vannskrekk (1969)
- Sommeren med Electric (1971)
- Week-end blues (1973)

Books she wrote were translated to Swedish, Danish, and German.

== Personal life ==
She resided in Vestre Gausdal Municipality for sixteen years, then in Snertingdal Municipality.

She died in November 2016 in Lillehammer, being survived by three sons and one daughter.
