= Olav T. Laake =

Norwegian politician (1934–2024)

Olav Trygveson Laake (20 October 1934 – 23 June 2024) was a Norwegian judge and politician for the Labour Party.

== Life and career ==
Laake was born in Ullensaker. He had his own lawyer's office from 1963 to 1976, and from 2007 to 2023, since 1964 as a barrister with access to working with Supreme Court cases. He served as a judge in Stavanger District Court from 1976, and from 1990 to 2004 as district stipendiary magistrate (chief justice). He also chaired the Norwegian Association of Judges from 1989 to 1995.

In politics, he served as a member of Stavanger city council from 1963 to 1987, and also Rogaland county council between 1971 and 1975. He chaired his local party chapter in Stavanger from 1969 to 1975.

Laake died on 23 June 2024, at the age of 89.
