= Edvard Kaurin Barth =

Norwegian zoologist and photographer (1913–1996)

- Born: 19 April 1913; Trondheim, Norway
- Died: 23 April 1996 (aged 83)
- Occupations: Zoologist; Photographer; Journal editor

Edvard Kaurin Barth (19 April 1913 – 23 April 1996) was a Norwegian zoologist and photographer.

== Biography ==
Barth was born in Trondheim He worked as curator at the Zoological Museum in Oslo from 1956 to 1981. He was a board member and later chairman of the Norwegian Ornithological Society, and edited the periodical Fauna norvegica from 1979 to 1994. Among his works are Måkeskrik from 1947, Fokstumyra from 1971, and Rondane nasjonalpark from 1971. During the occupation of Norway by Nazi Germany Barth was a central member of the clandestine intelligence network XU.
