= Alfred Oftedal Telhaug =

Norwegian educationalist

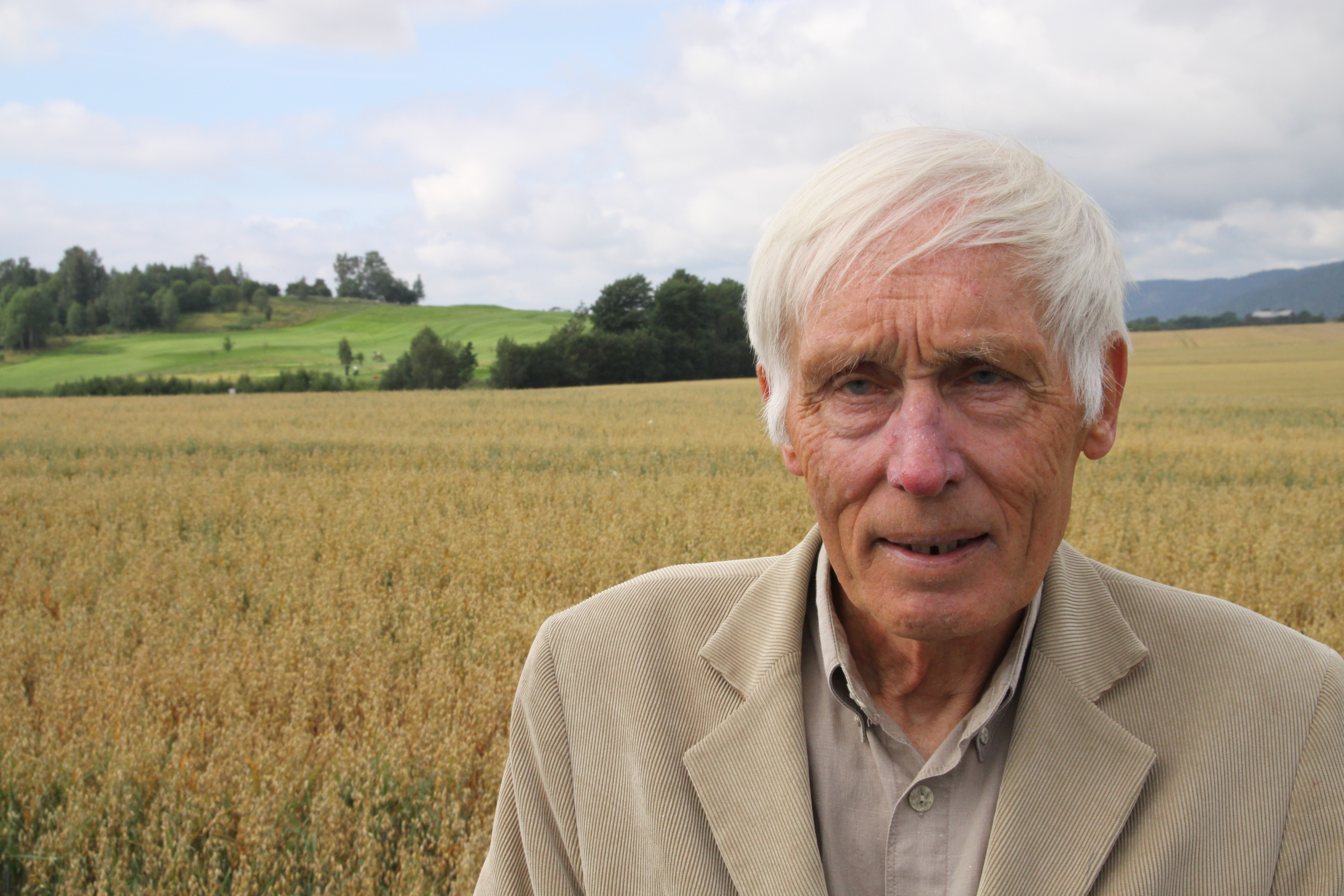
- Born: 25 September 1934; Skudeneshavn, Norway
- Died: 10 June 2016 (aged 81)
- Occupation: Educationalist

Alfred Oftedal Telhaug (25 September 1934 – 10 June 2016) was a Norwegian educationalist.

== Early life ==
Telhaug was born in Skudeneshavn to Vicar Andreas Telhaug and Randi Oftedal. He graduated from Stavanger Cathedral School in 1953, the teacher's school in Oslo in 1959, the University of Oslo in 1962, and study the Ph.D. degree at the University of Trondheim in 1990.

== Work ==
He was assigned with Norges Lærerhøgskole in Trondheim (later the Norwegian University of Science and Technology) from 1967 to 2001, and chaired the University's Institute of Pedagogy for three periods.

From 1973 to 1981, he edited the journal Norsk pedagogisk tidsskrift. His publications include Fra parallelle skoler til enhetsskole from 1974, Vår nye videregående skole from 1975, Norsk skoleutvikling etter 1945 from 1982, and Norsk utdanningspolitisk retorikk 1945–2000 from 1999. He was a member of the Norwegian Academy of Science and Letters.
