= Gunnar Aasland =

Norwegian judge

- Born: 15 April 1936; Oslo, Norway
- Education: University of Oslo (cand.jur., 1961)
- Occupation: Judge
- Notable work: Supreme Court Justice of Norway (1979–2006)
- Awards: Order of St. Olav (Commander, 2006)

Gunnar Aasland (born 15 April 1936) is a Norwegian judge.

He was born in Oslo, and graduated from the University of Oslo as cand.jur. in 1961. He worked in the Office of the Attorney General of Norway from 1967 to 1968 and 1972 to 1979 and as a lawyer from 1969 to 1972. He was a Supreme Court Justice from 1979 to 2006. In 2006 he was decorated as a Commander of the Order of St. Olav.

He resides at Nadderud.
