= Ole Enger (chief executive) =

Norwegian businessman

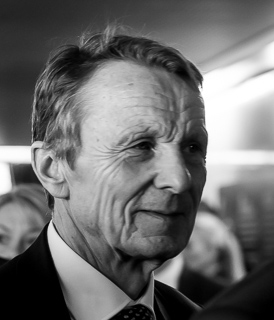
Enger in 2016

Ole Enger (born 14 March 1948) is a Norwegian businessperson.

He holds a Cand.agric. degree from the Norwegian College of Agriculture. He was employed by Nordsildmel from 1971, then Norsk Hydro from 1986 where he among others was the chief executive of Hydro Seafood. He was then the chief executive officer of Elkem from 1992 to 2006, Sapa Group from 2006 to 2009 and Renewable Energy Corporation from 2009 to 2013.

Enger has also been chairman of Norsk Gjenvinning Norge and Nel.
