= Erik Enger =

Norwegian physician

- Born: 10 April 1927; Oslo, Norway
- Died: 15 June 2016 (aged 89)
- Occupation: Physician

Erik Enger (10 April 1927 – 15 June 2016) was a Norwegian physician.

Enger was born in Oslo. He was professor of internal medicine at the University of Oslo, and worked as a physician at Ullevål Hospital from 1973 to 1995. He chaired the ethical council of the Norwegian Medical Association from 1974 to 1985, and contributed to the public debate on medical ethics and jurisprudence.
