= Nils Petter Faarlund =

Norwegian mountaineer

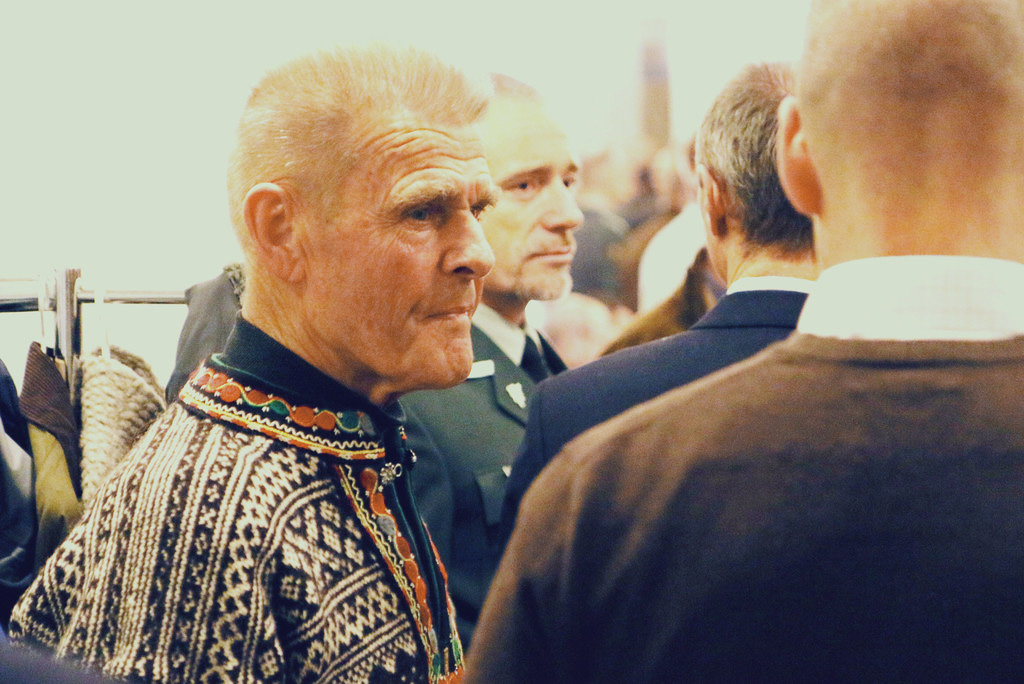
- Faarlund in 2015
- Born: 1937 (age 87–88); Østre Toten Municipality, Norway
- Occupation: Mountaineer
- Awards: Order of St. Olav (2008)

Nils Petter Faarlund (born 1937) is a Norwegian mountaineer. He has been proponent for outdoor recreation by simple means, with use of natural materials, expressing criticism to commercialisation and synthetic materials.

== Career ==
Born in 1937 in Østre Toten Municipality, Faarlund graduated as biochemical engineer from the Norwegian Institute of Technology in 1961. He established Norges Høgfjellsskole in Hemsedal Municipality in 1967. In 1972 he established outdoor recreation as an academic field at the Norwegian School of Sport Sciences. He was also responsible for mountaineering courses at the Norwegian Military Academy.

His first ascents include climbing the west wall of Store Venjetinden in winter 1963, the west wall of Stetinden in 1966, and the north wall of Tjørnholstinden in 1972.

Faarlund edited the magazine Mestre fjellet from 1968 to 2000. in 2015 he published the book Frilutsliv. He has been a proponent for practicing outdoor recreation by simple means, with use of natural materials, and has expressed criticism to commercialization and use of syntetic materials.

== Awards ==
Faarlund was awarded honorary membership of the International Federation of Mountain Guide Associations in 1999.

He was decorated Knight, First Class of the Order of St. Olav in 2008, and was awarded Den norske friluftslivprisen in 2009.
