= Knut Haug =

Norwegian politician (born 1934)

Knut Haug (born 31 March 1934) is a Norwegian politician for the Conservative Party.

He was elected to Ål municipal council in 1971, and was re-elected on five successive occasions. During this period he was mayor for fourteen years. He was also a member of Buskerud county council for one term, and after a hiatus he returned to Ål municipal council in 2003.

Haug has also chaired the regional council (regionrådet) in Hallingdal, and he has been a member of the board of Landssamanslutninga av Vasskraftkommunar as well as the toll road company Vegfinans. Outside politics he worked as a farmer from 1960 to 2000.
