= Astrid Gunnestad =

Norwegian journalist and radio presenter

Astrid Synnøve Gunnestad (19 August 1938 – 18 May 2016) was a Norwegian journalist and radio presenter.

She was born in Asker. She started her journalistic career in Morgenbladet in 1971, and was hired by Norsk Ukeblad in 1972. From 1987 to 2007 she was their editorial manager, then, from 2007 to her death in 2016 she presented her own radio show for P4. The Association of Norwegian Editors' Honorary Award was bestowed upon her in 2015.
