= Bjørn Lidin Hansen =

Norwegian footballer (1989-2016)

Personal information
- Full name: Bjørn Lidin Hansen
- Date of birth: 11 June 1989
- Place of birth: Kiruna, Sweden
- Date of death: 25 October 2016 (aged 27)
- Place of death: Tromsø, Norway
- Position: Midfielder

Youth career
- Stakkevollan
- Fløya
- 2005–2006: Lyn
- 2007: Tromsø

Senior career*
Years	Team	Apps	(Gls)
2006	Lyn	0	(0)
2008–2009	Tromsø	1	(0)
2010–2012	Tromsdalen	33	(0)
2013–2016	Lyn	44	(0)

International career
2004	Norway U15	4	(0)
2005	Norway U16	3	(0)
- * Club domestic league appearances and goals as of 3 November 2016

Bjørn Lidin Hansen (11 June 1989 – 25 October 2016) was a Norwegian footballer who played one match in the Norwegian Premier League for Tromsø, and also played senior football for Tromsdalen and Lyn. He also played seven youth internationals for Norway.

== Football career ==
Hansen was born in Kiruna, Sweden, to a Norwegian father and Swedish mother. The family soon relocated to Norway; first to Storslett and around 1992–93 to Tromsø. He played youth football in Stakkevollan IL and IF Fløya. In 2005, he moved south to attend the Norwegian Academy of Elite Sport, and while staying there, he played one game for Lyn in the Norwegian Cup in 2006. He then moved home to play for the youth team of Tromsø IL.

Drafted into the first team, Hansen made his debut in the Norwegian Premier League on 12 July 2008, in the game between Aalesund and Tromsø, as a 90th-minute substitute for Morten Moldskred. This turned out to be his only first-team match for Tromsø; he left the club in July 2009, choosing to take a sabbatical from football. In April 2010, he was close to signing with First Division side Sarpsborg 08, before ending up signing a contract with Tromsdalen. He left Tromsdalen after the 2012 season and rejoined Lyn, then a 2. divisjon team, the following spring.

== Illness and death ==
In the spring of 2015, Hansen was diagnosed with Ewing's sarcoma, a rare form of cancer. He was declared cancer-free about a year later, and successfully returned to Lyn, playing his first match after the cancer battle on 10 September 2016.

Hansen died on 25 October 2016. His family revealed that he had suffered from constant pain, fatigue and depression after his cancer recovery, and according to his obituary, he "could not bear to live with the pain, and chose death over life."
