= Henrik Jahre =

Norwegian politician (born 1937)

Henrik Jahre (born 21 April 1937) is a Norwegian politician for the Conservative Party.

He served as a deputy representative to the Norwegian Parliament from Vestfold during the terms 1973–1977 and 1977–1981. In total he met during 5 days of parliamentary session.
