= Per Øien =

Norwegian flutist

- Birth name: Per Olav Øien
- Born: 31 October 1937; Bergen, Norway
- Origin: Norway
- Died: 25 May 2016 (aged 78)
- Occupation: Musician
- Instruments: Flute

Per Olav Øien (31 October 1937 – 25 May 2016) was a Norwegian flautist.

== Biography ==
Øien was born in Bergen to Peder Øien and Eva Kitty Bøe. He graduated from Bergens Handelsgymnas in 1956, and studied flute at Bergen Musikkonservatorium under the flautist Hans Stenseth and music theory teacher Trygve Fischer. In his hometown, he played with the Bergen Philharmonic Orchestra (1956–61), but moved to Oslo to study with Ørnulf Gulbransen. He debuted at Universitetets Aula in 1962 and he started Oslo Blåsekvintett in 1962 with peers. Øien was assigned as solo flutist for the Norwegian Radio Orchestra from 1962 to 1967, and with the Oslo Philharmonic from 1967 to 1985. From 1985 he was appointed professor at the Norwegian Academy of Music. His albums include Contemporary Music From Norway (1972, with Eva Knardahl), Concerto for Flute and Strings from 1978, and Flute and Harp from 1985. He recorded and toured internationally with the ensemble Den Norske Blåsekvintett where he replaced Ørnulf Gulbransens in 1972, which received the Norwegian Music Critics Award for 1976/1977.
