= 2003 Norwegian county council election =

The 2003 county council election was held on Monday 15 September 2003 for all eighteen county councils in Norway. The election was held parallel to the municipal council election.

== Votes ==
Aggregates votes
Party	Votes	%	+/-	Seats	+/-	Mayors
Total	1,928,300	100.0		787		19
Labour Party (Ap, Arbeiderpartiet)	520,558	27,0		223		7
Progress Party (Frp, Fremskrittspartiet)	346,020	17.9		137		
Conservative Party (H, Høyre)	344,171	17.8		128		3
Socialist Left Party (SV, Sosialistisk Venstreparti)	251,551	13.0		102		1
Centre Party (Sp, Senterpartiet)	155,137	8.0		80		4
Christian Democrats (KrF, Kristelig Folkeparti)	132,540	6.9		59		4
Liberal Party (V, Venstre)	71,026	3.7		30		
Pensioners Party (Pp, Pensjonistpartiet)		1.7		8		
Red Electoral Alliance (RV, Rød Valgallianse)		1.5		8		
Coastal Party (Kp, Kystpartiet)		0.6		4		
Democrats (D, Demokratene)		0.3		1		
Sunnmøre List (Sl, Sunnmørslista)		0.3		3		
Green Party (MDG, Miljøpartiet De Grønne)		0.2				
Vestfold List (Vl, Vestfoldlista)		0.1		2		
Communist Party (NKP, Norges Kommunistiske Parti)		0.1		0		
Sami People's Party (Samefolkets parti)		0.1		2		
Other		0.6				

Votes, percent by county
County	Ap	Frp	H	SV	Sp	KrF	V	Pp	RV	Kp	D	Sl	MDG	Vl	NKP	Sa	Other
Akershus	25.7	18.6	25.6	13.6	4.4	4.2	2.3		0.2	0.1							1.3
Aust-Agder	22.0	19.6	16.5	11.8	7.7	14.2	2.5	0.8	0.2	0.3							
Buskerud	30.6	19.0	22.3	11.0	7.3	4.5	3.0		1.1	0.2	0.3		0.5		0.2		
Finnmark	30.2	11.0	12.8	14.9	4.7	3.7		1.8	3.1						0.8	4.7	
Hedmark	39.8	11.7	9.4	13.1	14.1	3.1	3.0	4.6	0.7	0.2	0.2						
Hordaland	23.1	21.5	19.1	11.1	6.5	8.6	3.4	2.1	2.7	0.6	0.3		0.5		0.1		0.3
Møre og Romsdal	19.4	20.7	16.0	7.8	11.0	10.8	5.6	1.3	0.6	0.6	0.1	5.8	0.2				
Nordland	31.1	15.7	11.3	16.1	11.0	4.6	3.0	1.2	2.1	3.4	0.2		0.4				
Nord-Trøndelag	34.9	10.3	7.7	13.5	22.4	4.8	4.8		0.6	0.4	0.1			0.3			
Oppland	40.5	12.2	9.2	11.0	16.7	4.3	2.9	1.4	1.0	0.2	0.1		0.4				
Oslo	25.2	16.5	25.0	20.3		3.0	4.2	0.9	3.1						0.1		1.9
Rogaland	18.6	23.2	20.7	9.0	7.4	12.1	2.9	0.9	0.4	0.1			0.3				0.6
Sogn og Fjordane	25.4	8.5	9.7	10.2	28.8	7.1	10.2	1.5	0.6	0.1							
Sør-Trøndelag	30.8	11.9	16.2	14.9	10.5	5.0	3.0	3.4	1.9	0.4	0.6		0.9		0.2		0.1
Telemark	34.5	21.2	9.7	13.2	8.4	7.8	3.0		1.5	0.2	0.2						0.3
Troms	27.0	16.2	11.5	14.5	12.3	7.8	2.8		2.2	3.1	0.4		0.6		0.3		1.3
Vest-Agder	17.7	17.6	17.5	10.6	5.9	21.0	3.8	1.0		0.3	2.4				0.2		2.0
Vestfold	22.6	25.3	18.3	11.5	4.8	5.7	2.5	1.7	2.2	0.2	0.1		0.5	4.5			
Østfold	31.7	20.8	14.4	11.3	7.3	7.7	1.9	2.5	1.5	0.3	0.3						0.4

== Seats ==
Seats by county
County	Total	Ap	Frp	H	SV	Sp	KrF	V	Pp	RV	Kp	D	Sl	MDG	Vl	NKP	Sa
Akershus	43	11	8	11	6	2	2	2		1							
Aust-Agder	35	8	7	6	4	3	5	1	1								
Buskerud	43	14	8	10	5	3	2	1									
Finnmark	35	14	4	5	5	2	1			1							2
Hedmark	33	13	4	3	4	5	1	1	2								
Hordaland	57	13	13	11	6	4	5	2	1	2							
Møre og Romsdal	47	9	10	8	5	5	4	3					3				
Nordland	53	17	8	6	9	6	2	2	1	2							
Nord-Trøndelag	35	12	3	3	5	8	2	2									
Oppland	37	15	5	4	4	6	2	1									
Oslo	59	15	10	15	12		2	2		2							
Rogaland	47	9	11	10	4	4	6	2	1								
Sogn og Fjordane	39	10	3	4	3	12	3	4									
Sør-Trøndelag	37	12	4	6	6	4	2	1	1	1							
Telemark	41	14	9	4	6	4	3	1									
Troms	37	10	6	4	6	5	3	1		1	1						
Vest-Agder	35	7	6	6	4	2	8	1									
Vestfold	39	9	10	7	5	2	2	1		1					2		
Østfold	35	11	8	5	4	3	3		1								

== County mayors ==
County mayors
County	Chairman	Party	Deputy	Party
Akershus	Hildur Horn Øien	Christian Democrat	Siri Hov Eggen	Labour
Aust-Agder	Oddvar Skaiaa	Christian Democrat	Laila Øygarden	Labour
Buskerud	Tor Ottar Karlsen	Labour	Nils Peter Undebakke	Centre
Finnmark	Kirsti Saxi	Socialist Left	Runar Sjåstad	Labour
Hedmark	Siri Austeng	Labour	Marit Nyhuus	Socialist Left
Hordaland	Torill Selsvold Nyborg	Christian Democrat	Tom-Christer Nilsen	Conservative
Møre og Romsdal	Jon Aasen	Labour	Svein A. Roseth	Christian Democrat
Nordland	Jon Tørset	Centre	Marien Henriette Korsrud	Labour
Nord-Trøndelag	Erik Bartnes	Centre	Åse Marie Hagen	Labour
Oppland	Audun Tron	Labour	Aksel Hagen	Socialist Left
Oslo	Per Ditlev-Simonsen	Conservative	Svenn Kristiansen	Progress Party
Rogaland	Roald Bergsaker	Conservative	Reidun Korsvoll	Labour
Sogn og Fjordane	Nils R. Sandal	Centre	Tor Bremer	Labour
Sør-Trøndelag	Tore O. Sandvik	Labour	Beate Marie Dahl Eide	Centre
Telemark	Gunn Marit Helgesen	Conservative	Lars Bjaadal	Centre
Troms	Ronald Rindestu	Centre	Ane Marthe Aasen	Christian Democrats
Vest-Agder	Thore Westermoen	Christian Democrat	Toril Runden	Labour
Vestfold	Tove Lisbeth Vasvik	Labour	Svein Kristian Waale	Christian Democrat
Østfold	Arne Øren	Labour	Svein Christoffersen	Christian Democrat

== Cabinets ==
County cabinets
County	Chairman	Parties
Hedmark	Reidar Åsgård	Labour, Socialist Left
Nordland	Odd Eriksen	Labour, Socialist Left
Nord-Trøndelag	Alf Daniel Moen	Labour, Centre
Oslo	Erling Lae	Conservative, Progress
Troms	Paul Dahlø	Labour, Centre, Christian Democrat, Coastal

== See also ==
- County council
- Elections in Norway
