= Bartnes =

Bartnes may refer to the following:

== Places ==
- Bartnes, Trøndelag, a village in the municipality of Steinkjer in Trøndelag county, Norway
- Bartnes Church, a church in the village of Bartnes in the municipality of Steinkjer in Trøndelag county, Norway

== People ==
- Erik Bartnes (born 1939), Norwegian politician
- Inge Bartnes (born 1970), Norwegian politician
- Inge Einarsen Bartnes (1911–1988), Norwegian politician
- Lars Erik Bartnes (born 1978), Norwegian politician
- Martin Bartnes (born 1978), Norwegian ski mountaineer and cross-country skier
