= Kjersti Bjørnstad =

Norwegian politician (born 1984)

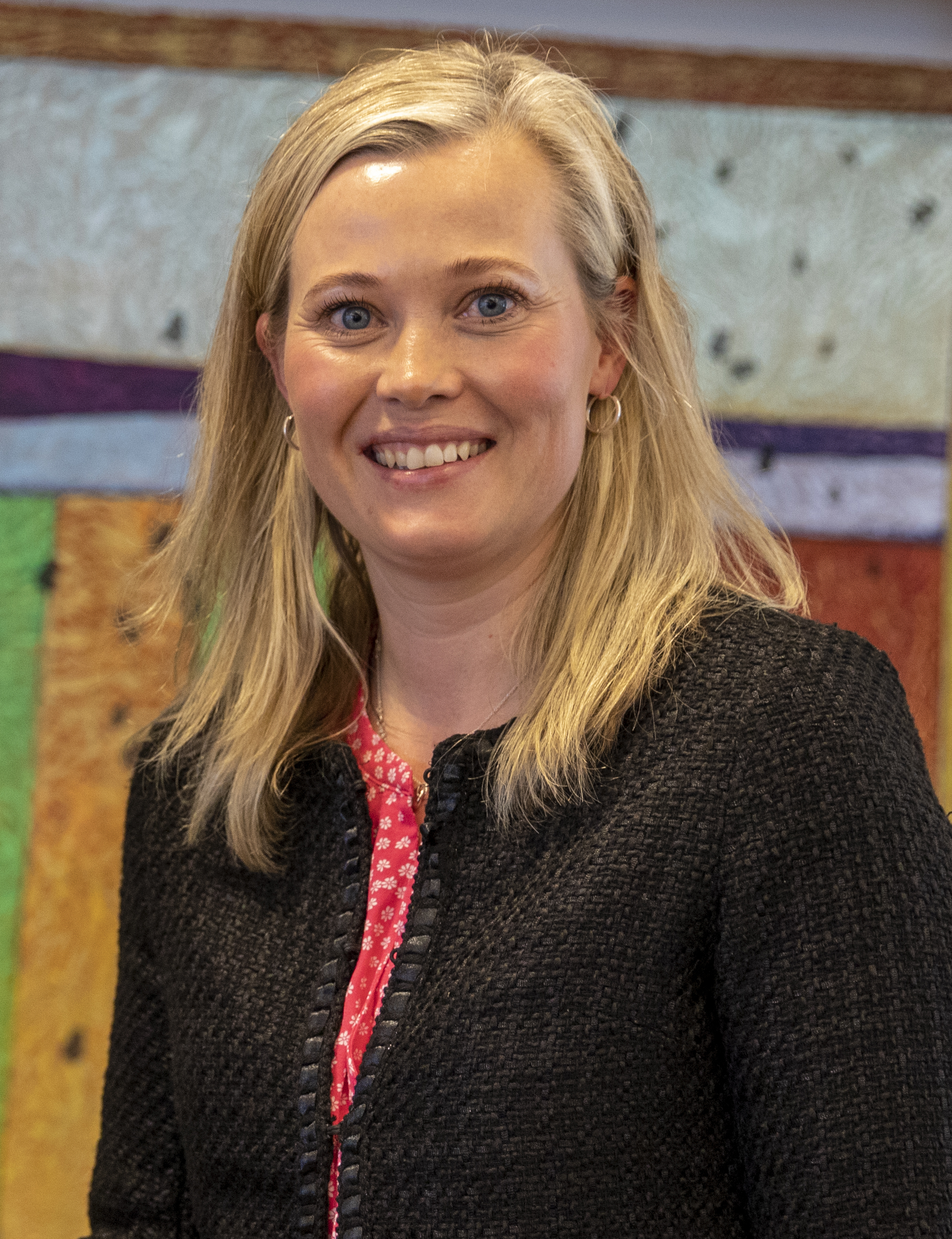

Deputy Member of the Storting
- Incumbent
- Assumed office 1 October 2021
- Constituency: Hedmark

Personal details
- Born: 10 April 1984 (age 42)
- Party: Centre
- Occupation: Politician

Kjersti Bjørnstad (born 10 April 1984) is a Norwegian politician for the Centre Party. She has served as a deputy member of the Norwegian parliament, the Storting, for Hedmark since 2021.

== Biography ==
She grew up at the farm Øvre Fauchald near Kapp. Moving to Gjøvik, she became a member of the municipal council as well as Oppland county council.

She served as a deputy representative to the Parliament of Norway from Oppland during the term 2021–2025. She started the term being appointed to Støre's Cabinet, as a State Secretary in the Ministry of Local Government and Regional Development from October 2021. In March 2023 she changed to the Ministry of the Environment. She remained here until the Centre Party exited Støre's Cabinet in February 2025. She soon started deputizing for Marit Knutsdatter Strand during the latter's maternity leave.

Bjørnstad was deputy leader of Oppland Centre Party for three years and then leader for two years until 2022.

In June 2026, she was selected as the Centre Party's candidate for county mayor of Innlandet for the 2027 local elections.
