= Skjølaas =

Skirbekk is a surname. Notable people with the surname include:

- Lars Skjølaas (1933–2011), Norwegian politician
- Ola Skjølaas (1941–2006), Norwegian veterinarian, civil servant and politician
