= Merethe Storødegård =

Norwegian politician (born 1961)

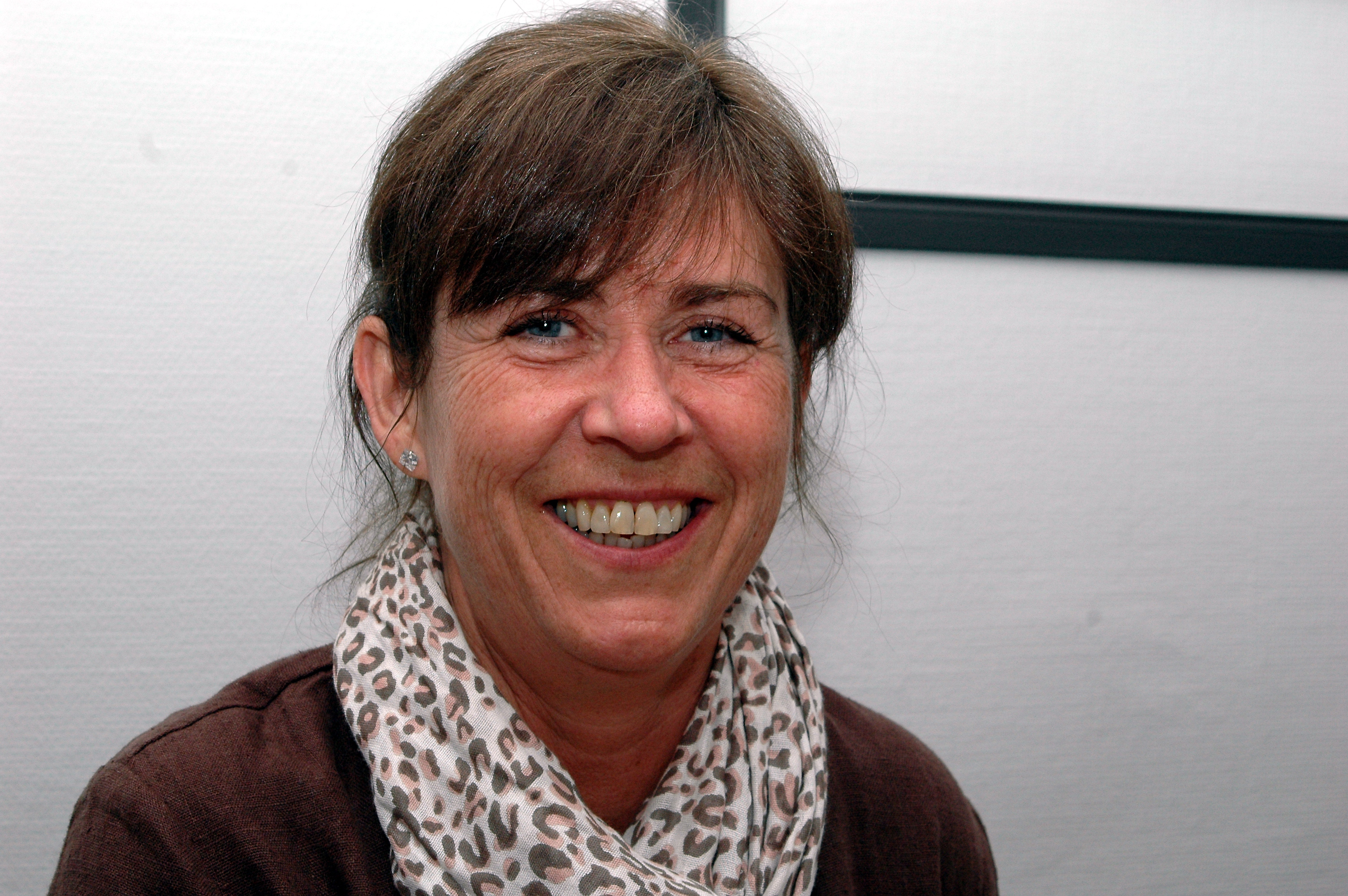
Merethe Storødegård

Merethe Gudmundseth Storødegård (born 11 August 1961) is a Norwegian politician for the Labour Party.

From 1 January 2004 she was the director of the Trøndelag chapter of the Confederation of Norwegian Enterprise, succeeding Otto Gregussen. Between 1997 and 2003 she was the county mayor of Nord-Trøndelag County Municipality. She was first elected to the municipal council of Stjørdal Municipality at the age of eighteen, and in 2003 she ran for mayor, but was not elected.

She is a daughter of Roger Gudmundseth. She lives in Stjørdal Municipality.

Political offices
Preceded by Bjarne Håkon Hanssen	County mayor of Nord-Trøndelag; 1997–2003	Succeeded by Erik Bartnes
