= Erik Bartnes =

Norwegian politician (1939–2020)

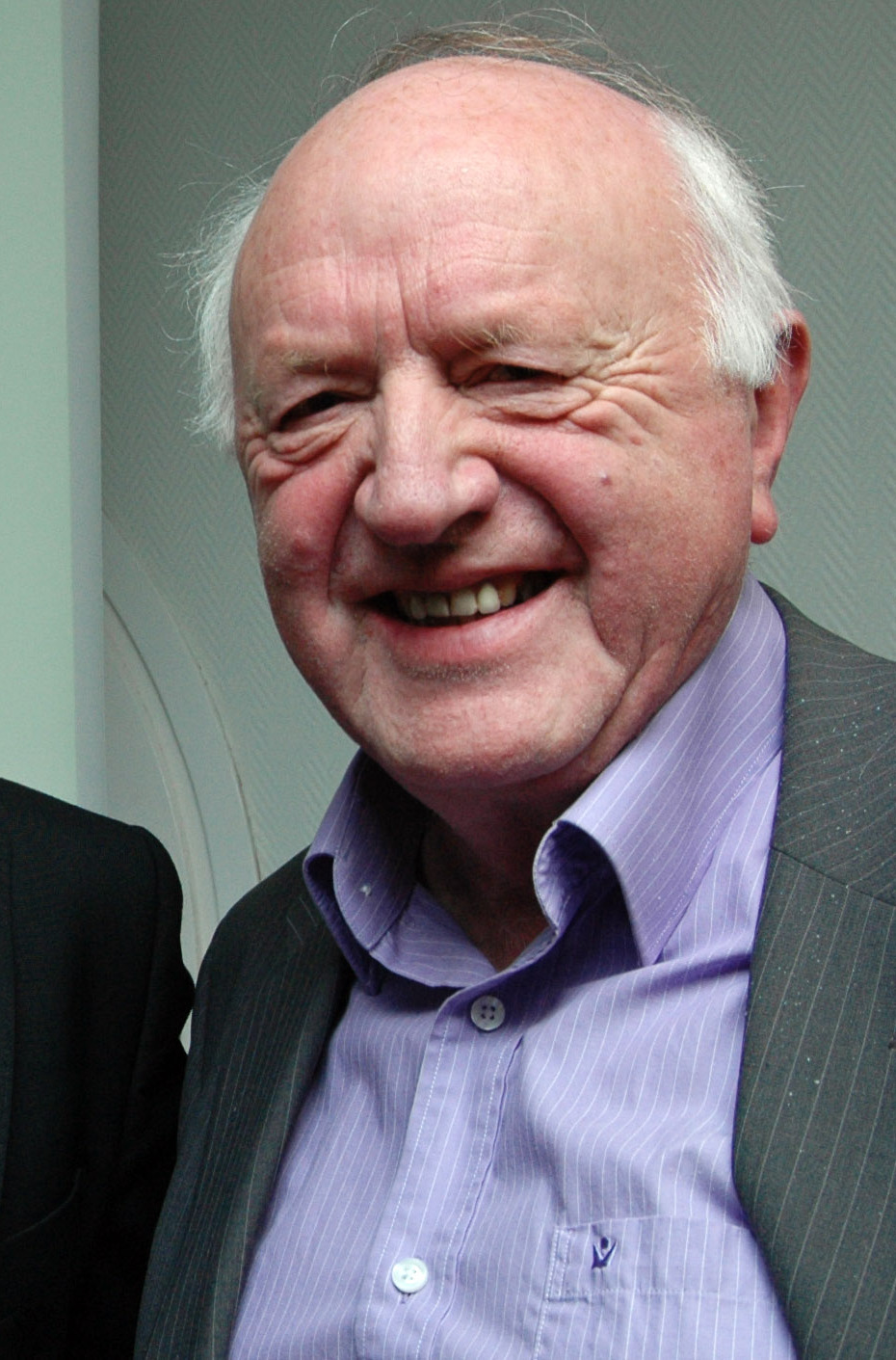

County mayor of Nord-Trøndelag
- In office 2003–2007
- Deputy: Åse Marie Hagen

Personal details
- Born: 27 November 1939
- Died: 26 September 2020 (aged 80)
- Party: Centre Party
- Spouse: Liv Astrid Bartnes
- Children: Inge Bartnes, Anne Margrethe Bartnes, Tore Bartnes, Lars Erik Bartnes
- Profession: Farmer

Erik Bartnes (27 November 1939 – 26 September 2020) was a Norwegian farmer and politician for the Centre Party.

He is a son of Inge Einarsen Bartnes and father of Inge Bartnes, Anne Margrethe Bartnes, Tore Bartnes and Lars Erik Bartnes. He was from Beitstad in Steinkjer Municipality.

He has worked in the Norwegian Agrarian Association and been mayor of Steinkjer. Following the 2003 county council election he was appointed county mayor of Nord-Trøndelag. He did not run for re-election in 2007.

He has also been a board member of the Regional Development Fund.

Political offices
Preceded by Merethe Storødegård	County mayor of Nord-Trøndelag; 2003–2007	Succeeded by Gunnar Viken
