= Audun Tron =

Norwegian politician

Audun Tron (born 7 March 1945) is a Norwegian politician for the Labour Party.

From 1987 to 1999, Tron was the mayor of Lillehammer. As such he played a role in the 1994 Winter Olympics.

During the first cabinet Stoltenberg, from 2000 to 2001, Tron was appointed State Secretary in the Ministry of Local Government.

Following the 2003 election, Tron became the new county mayor (fylkesordfører) of Oppland.

After the 2011 Norwegian local elections he was succeeded by partyfellow Gro Lundeby.

Political offices
Preceded by Hans Seierstad	County mayor of Oppland; 2003–2011	Succeeded by Gro Lundeby
