= Hans Seierstad =

Norwegian politician

Hans Seierstad (born 5 June 1951) is a Norwegian politician for the Centre Party.

He served as a deputy representative to the Parliament of Norway from Oppland during 2001–2005 and 2009–2013. In total he met during 50 days of parliamentary session.

From 1999 to 2003, he was the county mayor of Oppland. In 2003 he became mayor of Østre Toten Municipality.

Political offices
Preceded by Lars Skjølaas	County mayor of Oppland; 1999–2003	Succeeded by Audun Tron
