= Møre og Romsdal County Municipality =

Møre og Romsdal County Municipality Møre og Romsdal fylkeskommune
- County
- Flag Coat of arms

- Location in Norway
- Coordinates: 62.73455°N 7.15076°E
- Country: Norway
- Administrative center: Molde

Government
  - County mayor: Tove-Lise Torve
- ISO 3166 code: NO-15
- Revenue: 3,000 million kr
- Employees: 2,400
- Schools: 24
- Transit authority: None
- Roads: 1,771 km (1,100 mi)
- Website: www.mrfylke.no

Møre og Romsdal County Municipality (Norwegian: Møre og Romsdal fylkeskommune) is the democratically elected regional governing administration of Møre og Romsdal county in western Norway. The main responsibilities of the county municipality includes the running of 23 upper secondary schools with 2,000 teachers. It also owns and finances the county's road network, although operation is done through the Norwegian Public Roads Administration. Further responsibilities are public transport, 37 dental clinics with 200 dentists, culture and cultural heritage.

== County government ==
The county municipality's most important tasks include secondary education, recreation (sports and outdoor life), and cultural heritage. The county municipality is also responsible for all county roads (including ferry operations) and public transport (including school busses). The county municipality has further responsibility for regional land-use planning, business development, power production, and environmental management. The county also has responsibility for providing dental health services (in 2002, responsibility for hospitals and public medicine was transferred from the counties to the new regional health authorities).

=== County mayor ===
Since 1963, the county mayor (Norwegian: fylkesordfører) of Nordland has been the political leader of the county and the chairperson of the county council. Prior to 1963, the County governor led the council which was made up of all of the mayors of the rural municipalities within the county. Here is a list of people who have held this position:

- 1964–1967: Trygve Sildnes (Sp)
- 1968–1971: Jon Strømsheim (Ap)
- 1972–1974: Trygve Sildnes (Sp)
- 1975–1975: Johan Skipnes (KrF)
- 1976–1983: Kjell Furnes (KrF)
- 1984–1991: Lars Ramstad (H)
- 1992–1995: Grethe Bjørlo (Ap)
- 1995–2003: Ole Øverland (Sp)
- 2003–2007: Jon Aasen (Ap)
- 2007–2011: Olav Bratland (H)
- 2011–2019: Jon Aasen (Ap)
- 2019–2022: Tove-Lise Torve (Ap)
- 2023–present: Line Hatmosø Hoem (Ap)

=== County council ===
The county council (Norwegian: Fylkestinget) is made up of 45 representatives that are elected by direct election by all legal residents of the county every fourth year. The council is the legislative body for the county. The county council typically meets about six times a year. Council members are divided into standing committees and an executive committee (fylkesutvalg), which meet considerably more often. Both the council and executive committee (with at least 5 members) are led by the county mayor (Norwegian: fylkesordfører). The executive committee carries out the executive functions of the county under the direction of the whole council. The tables below show the current and historical composition of the council by political party.

Møre og Romsdal fylkesting 2023–2027
Party name (in Nynorsk)	Number of representatives
Labour Party (Arbeidarpartiet)	8
Progress Party (Framstegspartiet)	10
Green Party (Miljøpartiet Dei Grøne)	1
Conservative Party (Høgre)	9
Industry and Business Party (Industri‑ og Næringspartiet)	2
Christian Democratic Party (Kristeleg Folkeparti)	3
Red Party (Raudt)	1
Centre Party (Senterpartiet)	5
Socialist Left Party (Sosialistisk Venstreparti)	3
Liberal Party (Venstre)	2
Nordmøre List (Nordmørslista)	1
Sunnmøre List (Sunnmørslista)	1
Kyst- og distriktslista for Møre og Romsdal (Coastal and District List for Møre og Romsdal)	1
Total number of members:	47

Møre og Romsdal fylkesting 2019–2023
Party name (in Nynorsk)	Number of representatives
Labour Party (Arbeidarpartiet)	9
Progress Party (Framstegspartiet)	8
Green Party (Miljøpartiet Dei Grøne)	2
Conservative Party (Høgre)	7
Christian Democratic Party (Kristeleg Folkeparti)	3
Red Party (Raudt)	1
Centre Party (Senterpartiet)	9
Socialist Left Party (Sosialistisk Venstreparti)	3
Liberal Party (Venstre)	1
Nordmøre List (Nordmørslista)	2
Sunnmøre List (Sunnmørslista)	1
Independent election list for Sunnmøre (Uavhengig Valliste for Sunnmøre)	1
Total number of members:	47

Møre og Romsdal fylkesting 2015–2019
Party name (in Nynorsk)	Number of representatives
Labour Party (Arbeidarpartiet)	12
Progress Party (Framstegspartiet)	6
Green Party (Miljøpartiet Dei Grøne)	1
Conservative Party (Høgre)	9
Christian Democratic Party (Kristeleg Folkeparti)	4
Centre Party (Senterpartiet)	5
Socialist Left Party (Sosialistisk Venstreparti)	1
Liberal Party (Venstre)	3
Nordmøre List (Nordmørslista)	4
Sunnmøre List (Sunnmørslista)	1
Independent election list for Sunnmøre (Uavhengig Valliste for Sunnmøre)	1
Total number of members:	47

Møre og Romsdal fylkesting 2011–2015
Party name (in Norwegian)	Number of representatives
Labour Party (Arbeiderpartiet)	12
Progress Party (Fremskrittspartiet)	8
Conservative Party (Høyre)	11
Christian Democratic Party (Kristelig Folkeparti)	4
Centre Party (Senterpartiet)	4
Socialist Left Party (Sosialistisk Venstreparti)	1
Liberal Party (Venstre)	4
Sunnmøre List (Sunnmørslista)	3
Total number of members:	47

Møre og Romsdal fylkesting 2007–2011
Party name (in Norwegian)	Number of representatives
Labour Party (Arbeiderpartiet)	12
Progress Party (Fremskrittspartiet)	10
Conservative Party (Høyre)	7
Christian Democratic Party (Kristelig Folkeparti)	5
Centre Party (Senterpartiet)	5
Socialist Left Party (Sosialistisk Venstreparti)	2
Liberal Party (Venstre)	3
Sunnmøre List (Sunnmørslista)	3
Total number of members:	47

Møre og Romsdal fylkesting 2003–2007
Party name (in Norwegian)	Number of representatives
Labour Party (Arbeiderpartiet)	9
Progress Party (Fremskrittspartiet)	10
Conservative Party (Høyre)	8
Christian Democratic Party (Kristelig Folkeparti)	5
Centre Party (Senterpartiet)	5
Socialist Left Party (Sosialistisk Venstreparti)	4
Liberal Party (Venstre)	3
Sunnmøre List (Sunnmørslista)	3
Total number of members:	47

Møre og Romsdal fylkesting 1999–2003
Party name (in Norwegian)	Number of representatives
Labour Party (Arbeiderpartiet)	12
Progress Party (Fremskrittspartiet)	7
Conservative Party (Høyre)	10
Christian Democratic Party (Kristelig Folkeparti)	9
Pensioners' Party (Pensjonistpartiet)	1
Centre Party (Senterpartiet)	7
Socialist Left Party (Sosialistisk Venstreparti)	3
Liberal Party (Venstre)	3
Sunnmøre List (Sunnmørslista)	5
Total number of members:	57

Møre og Romsdal fylkesting 1995–1999
Party name (in Norwegian)	Number of representatives
Labour Party (Arbeiderpartiet)	14
Progress Party (Fremskrittspartiet)	5
Conservative Party (Høyre)	7
Christian Democratic Party (Kristelig Folkeparti)	8
Pensioners' Party (Pensjonistpartiet)	1
Centre Party (Senterpartiet)	9
Socialist Left Party (Sosialistisk Venstreparti)	2
Liberal Party (Venstre)	3
Joint list of Sunnmøre List and Cross-Party List (Fellesliste: Sunnmørslista og Tverrpolitisk liste)	8
Total number of members:	57

Møre og Romsdal fylkesting 1991–1995
Party name (in Norwegian)	Number of representatives
Labour Party (Arbeiderpartiet)	12
Progress Party (Fremskrittspartiet)	3
Conservative Party (Høyre)	8
Christian Democratic Party (Kristelig Folkeparti)	8
Centre Party (Senterpartiet)	8
Socialist Left Party (Sosialistisk Venstreparti)	5
Liberal Party (Venstre)	3
Sunnmøre List (Sunnmørslista)	3
Cross-party list (Tverrpolitisk liste)	7
Total number of members:	57

Møre og Romsdal fylkesting 1987–1991
Party name (in Norwegian)	Number of representatives
Labour Party (Arbeiderpartiet)	21
Progress Party (Fremskrittspartiet)	7
Conservative Party (Høyre)	13
Christian Democratic Party (Kristelig Folkeparti)	10
Centre Party (Senterpartiet)	7
Socialist Left Party (Sosialistisk Venstreparti)	3
Liberal Party (Venstre)	5
Sunnmøre List (Sunnmørslista)	3
Cross-party list (Tverrpolitisk liste)	2
Total number of members:	71

Møre og Romsdal fylkesting 1983–1987
Party name (in Norwegian)	Number of representatives
Labour Party (Arbeiderpartiet)	21
Progress Party (Fremskrittspartiet)	4
Conservative Party (Høyre)	14
Christian Democratic Party (Kristelig Folkeparti)	12
Centre Party (Senterpartiet)	8
Socialist Left Party (Sosialistisk Venstreparti)	3
Liberal Party (Venstre)	6
Haram List (Haramslista)	1
Cross-party list (Tverrpolitisk liste)	2
Total number of members:	71

Møre og Romsdal fylkesting 1979–1983
Party name (in Norwegian)	Number of representatives
Labour Party (Arbeiderpartiet)	19
Progress Party (Fremskrittspartiet)	1
Conservative Party (Høyre)	16
Christian Democratic Party (Kristelig Folkeparti)	14
New People's Party (Nye Folkepartiet)	1
Centre Party (Senterpartiet)	9
Socialist Left Party (Sosialistisk Venstreparti)	2
Liberal Party (Venstre)	7
Cross-party list (Tverrpolitisk liste)	2
Total number of members:	71

Møre og Romsdal fylkesting 1975–1979
Party name (in Norwegian)	Number of representatives
Labour Party (Arbeiderpartiet)	19
Conservative Party (Høyre)	9
Christian Democratic Party (Kristelig Folkeparti)	15
New People's Party (Nye Folkepartiet)	2
Centre Party (Senterpartiet)	13
Socialist Left Party (Sosialistisk Venstreparti)	2
Liberal Party (Venstre)	7
Cross-party list (Tverrpolitisk liste)	4
Total number of members:	71
