= Lars Skjølaas =

Norwegian politician

Lars Skjølaas (14 August 1933 – 21 July 2011) was a Norwegian politician for the Labour Party.

He was born in Fluberg and grew up in Hov, and spent his professional career as a managing director. His father Bernt Skjølaas was a longtime mayor.

Skjølaas was a member of the municipal council of Søndre Land Municipality, chaired Søndre Land Labour Party, and from 1976 to 1999 he was a member of Oppland county council. He was deputy county mayor from 1986 to 1992 and county mayor from 1992 to 1999. He served as a deputy representative to the Parliament of Norway from Oppland during the term 1977–1981. In total he met during 5 days of parliamentary session.

Political offices
Preceded by Ola Dahl	County mayor of Oppland; 1992–1999	Succeeded by Hans Seierstad
