= Eva Birkeland =

Norwegian civil servant

Eva Birkeland (born 10 September 1938) is a Norwegian civil servant.

He was born in Oslo and took the cand.oecon. She worked in the secretariat in NAVF from 1965. She was an assistant secretary in Statistics Norway from 1971 to 1972 and 1975 to 1978, then researcher in the Norwegian Employers' Confederation from 1979 to 1983. From 1983 to 1990 she was a deputy under-secretary of state in the Norwegian Ministry of Local Government and Regional Development. She was the director of the National Insurance Administration from 1991 to 1997, then an adviser in Statistics Norway.

Preceded by Kjell Knudsen	Director of the National Insurance Administration; 1991–1997	Succeeded by Dagfinn Høybråten
