= Beitstad =

Village in Steinkjer Municipality, Norway

- Village
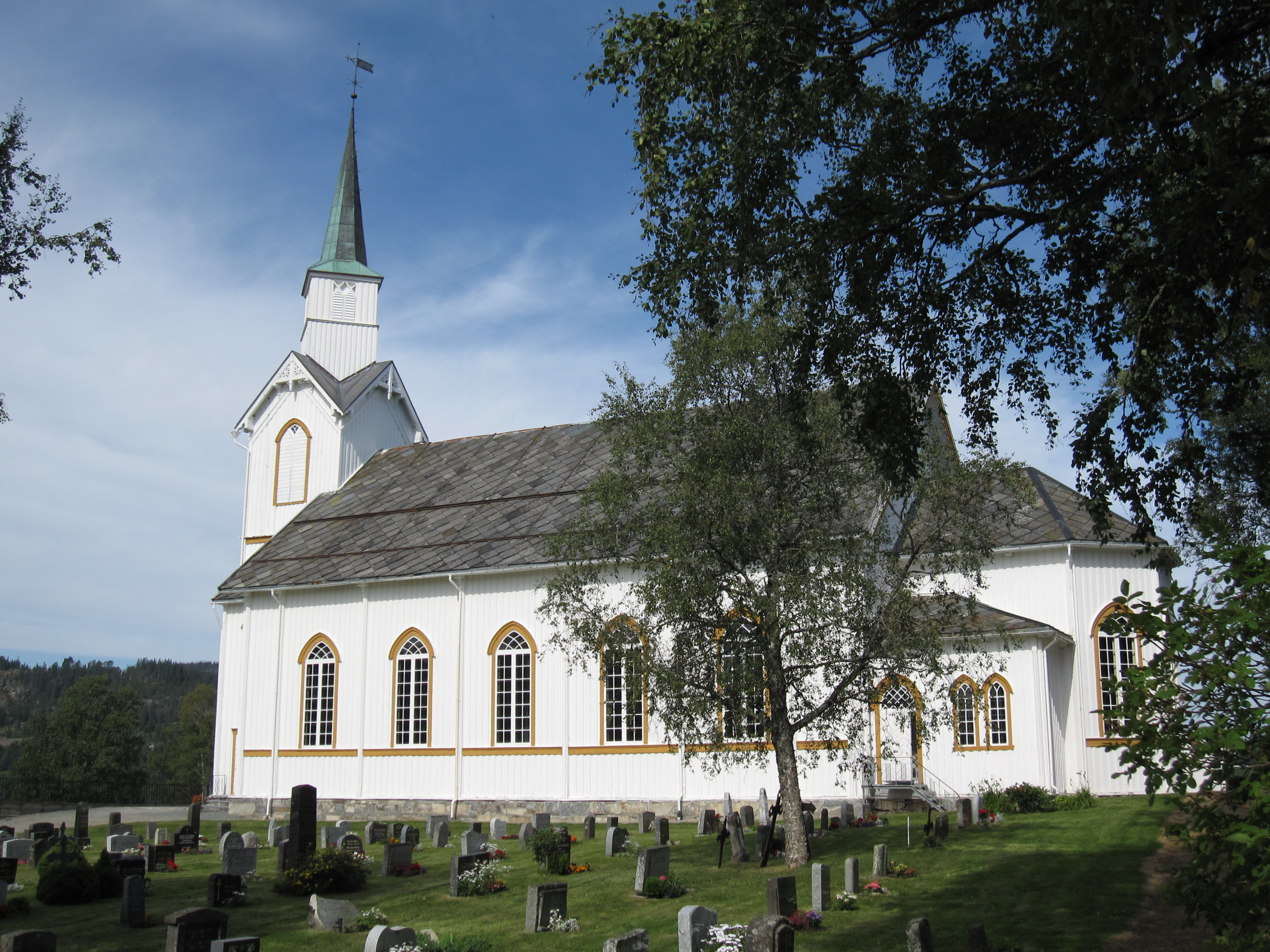
- View of the village church
- Interactive map of Beitstad
- Location within Trøndelag Location within Norway
- Coordinates: 64.0855°N 11.3615°E
- Country: Norway
- Region: Central Norway
- County: Trøndelag
- District: Innherred
- Municipality: Steinkjer Municipality
- Elevation: 54 m (177 ft)
- Time zone: UTC+01:00 (CET)
  - Summer (DST): UTC+02:00 (CEST)
- Post Code: 7730 Beitstad

Beitstad (Urban East Norwegian: [ˈbæ̂ɪtstɑ]) is a village in Steinkjer Municipality in Trøndelag county, Norway. The village is located along the Beitstadsundet strait at the end of the Beitstadfjorden at the inner end of the Trondheimsfjord, about 5 kilometres (3.1 mi) southwest of the village of Vellamelen and about 20 kilometres (12 mi) north of the town of Steinkjer.

Beitstad is situated along Norwegian County Road 17 (Fylkesvei 17) which has twisted through the village since 1867. It is a typical farming village that stretches from the bay and into the hinterland to the east. Animal husbandry, crop production, and forestry have traditionally been the prime industries. Beitstad Church is located in this village.

The village was the administrative centre of the old Beitstad Municipality which existed from 1838 until 1964 when it was merged into Steinkjer Municipality.

== Notable people ==
=== Founding fathers ===
Three citizens from Beitstad were among the founding fathers of the Norwegian Constitution:

- Sivert Bratberg (1780 at Bratberg øvre – 1816), a Norwegian farmer and teacher
- Hans Midelfart (1772–1823), Lutheran minister in Beitstad
- Daniel Larsen Schevig (1786 at Gladsjø farm –1833), farmer and military officer

=== Other people ===
- Theodora Cormontan (1840 in Beitstad – 1922), a Norwegian-American pianist, music publisher and composer
- Oluf A. Saugestad (1840 in Beitstad - 1926), a member of the Wisconsin State Assembly
- Hans Konrad Foosnæs (1846–1917), a politician, Mayor of Beitstad, and government Minister
- Halvor Bachke Guldahl (1859 in Beitstad – 1931), a jurist, businessman, and County Governor of Nord-Trøndelag
- Kristofer Uppdal (1878 in Beitstad – 1961), a poet and author
- Olav Benum (1897 in Beitstad – 1990), a politician and agronomist
- Erling Østerberg (1901 in Beitstad – 1981), a distinguished Norwegian police officer
- Inge Einarsen Bartnes (1911 in Beitstad – 1988), a politician, twice deputy Mayor
- Stål Aanderaa (born 1931 in Beitstad), a Norwegian mathematician
- Jorunn Aanderaa (born 1934 in Beitstad - 2025), a Norwegian avant-garde poet
- Erik Bartnes (born 1939 in Beitstad), a Norwegian farmer and politician
