= Kjell Knudsen =

Norwegian politician (1931–2022)

Kjell Knudsen (23 March 1931 – 2022) was a Norwegian civil servant and politician for the Labour Party.

He was born in Jevnaker. He spent his working career from 1948 to 1973 in the Norwegian State Railways, before embarking on a political career at the national level. From 1973 to 1977, during Bratteli's Second Cabinet and Nordli's Cabinet, Knudsen was appointed State Secretary in the Ministry of Social Affairs. He subsequently worked in the secretariat of the Nordic Council of Ministers from 1977 to 1979. He was the director of the National Insurance Administration from 1979 to 1991 before returning to the Ministry of Social Affairs as head of reporting.

Knudsen had moved to Asker where he became deputy mayor. He was elected as a deputy representative to the Parliament of Norway from Akershus during the term 1965–1969, albeit without being present in parliamentary session. He served as county mayor of Akershus from 1969 to 1975. Among others, he oversaw the creation of Stor-Oslo Lokaltrafikk. Knudsen, who received honorary membership in the Labour Party, died in late 2022 at the age of 91.

Political offices
Preceded by Thor Gystad	County mayor of Akershus; 1969–1975	Succeeded by Thorleif Løken
Civic offices
Preceded by Finn Alexander	Director of the National Insurance Administration; 1979–1991	Succeeded by Eva Birkeland
