= Opplandstrafikk =

Public transport administration for bus transport in Oppland, Norway

Opplandstrafikk is the public transport administration for bus transport in Oppland, Norway and is part of the central administration of the Oppland County Municipality. The unit plans, markets and organises the public transport in Oppland, but does not operate any buses itself. Instead it issues contracts to operating companies based on negotiated contracts or public service obligation. Opplandstrafikk has mostly bus traffic, but also one ferry line, Tangen–Horn in Gran Municipality. The rail traffic inside Oppland is organised and ticketed by NSB without involvement of Opplandstrafikk.

All buses operated on contract for Opplandstrafikk are uniformly painted white and OpplandsTrafikk takes care of marketing and customer relations for the bus companies. The companies that operate for Opplandstrafikk are Etnedal Bilruter, Jotunheimen og Valdresruten Bilselskap, Lesja Bilruter, Nettbuss, Ringebu Bilruter, Snertingdal Auto, Torpa Bilruter, TrønderBilene and Unibuss.
