= Bjarne Håkon Hanssen =

Norwegian politician (born 1962)

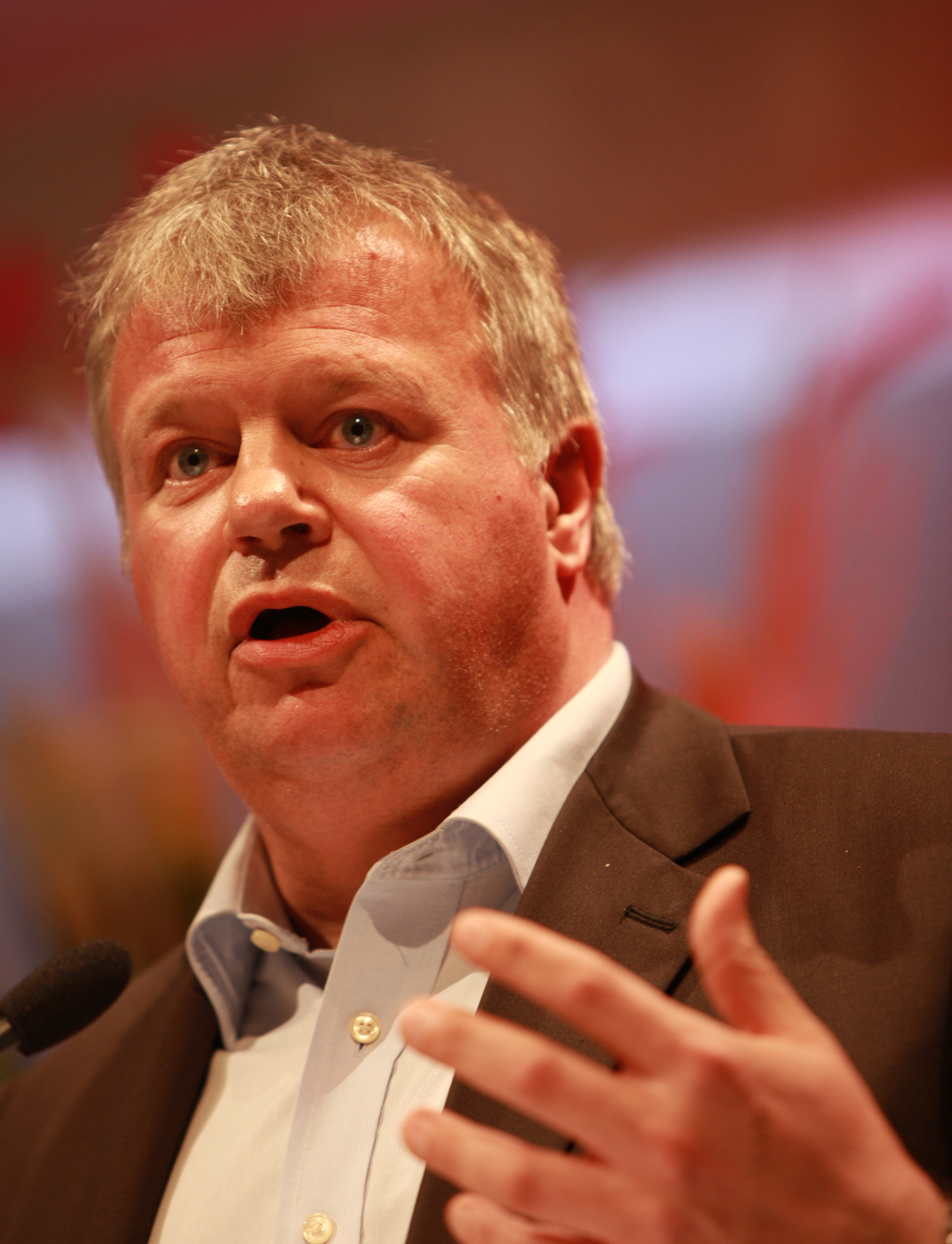

Minister of Health and Care Services
- In office 20 June 2008 – 20 October 2009
- Prime Minister: Jens Stoltenberg
- Preceded by: Sylvia Brustad
- Succeeded by: Anne-Grete Strøm-Erichsen

Minister of Labour and Social Inclusion
- In office 17 October 2005 – 20 June 2008
- Prime Minister: Jens Stoltenberg
- Preceded by: Dagfinn Høybråten
- Succeeded by: Dag Terje Andersen

Minister of Agriculture
- In office 17 March 2000 – 19 October 2001
- Prime Minister: Jens Stoltenberg
- Preceded by: Kåre Gjønnes
- Succeeded by: Lars Sponheim

County Mayor of North-Trøndelag
- In office October 1995 – 1 October 1997
- Preceded by: Kolbjørn Almlid
- Succeeded by: Merethe Storødegård

Member of the Norwegian Parliament
- In office 1 October 1997 – 30 September 2009
- Constituency: Nord-Trøndelag

Personal details
- Born: 1 November 1962 (age 63) Bangsund, Nord-Trøndelag, Norway
- Party: Labour

Bjarne Håkon Hanssen (born 1 November 1962) is a Norwegian politician of the Labour Party who served Minister of Health and Social Care Services from 2008 to 2009, Minister of Labour and Social Inclusion from 2005 to 2008 and Minister of Agriculture from 2000 to 2001. On 8 October 2009 Hansen announced that he would step down as a minister when Stoltenberg's reshuffled cabinet would be put together. As a minister he was both liked for his down to earth attitude, but also received much criticism for statements like “People on benefit must get up in the morning”. He was also member of Parliament from 1997 to 2009 and county mayor of Nord-Trøndelag from 1995 to 1997.

== Biography ==
Hanssen graduated from Namsos Upper Secondary School in 1981 and from Levanger Teacher College in 1985. He worked within the psychiatric services before becoming administrative chief for Fosen municipality in 1989. He was first elected to the Nord-Trøndelag county council in 1983. In 1995 he was elected County Mayor, but was then elected to Storting two years later. In 2000 he was appointed Minister of Agriculture, serving until 2001. He became Minister of Labour and Social Inclusion in 2005; in June 2008 he was moved to the post of Minister of Health. He held said post until he announced that he would not stand for re-election in the 2009 and election and subsequently step down as minister.

Political offices
| Preceded by Kåre Gjønnes | Norwegian Minister of Agriculture; 2000–2001 | Succeeded by Lars Sponheim |
| Preceded by Dagfinn Høybråten | Norwegian Minister of Labour and Social Inclusion; 2005–2008 | Succeeded by Dag Terje Andersen |
| Preceded by Sylvia Brustad | Norwegian Minister of Health and Care Services; 2008–2009 | Succeeded by Anne-Grete Strøm-Erichsen |
| Preceded by Kolbjørn Almlid | County mayor of Nord-Trøndelag; 1995–1997 | Succeeded by Merethe Storødegård |
