= Kolbjørn Almlid =

Norwegian businessperson and politician (born 1945)

- Born: 1945 (age 80–81)
- Occupation: Businessman

Kolbjørn Almlid (born 2 June 1945) is a Norwegian businessperson and politician for the Centre Party.

He hails from Verran Municipality. From 1989 to 1990, during Syse's Cabinet, he was appointed State Secretary in the Ministry of Petroleum and Energy. He served as a deputy representative to the Parliament of Norway from Nord-Trøndelag during the term 1989–1993. From 1991 to 1995 he was county mayor of Nord-Trøndelag. Outside politics, he was a director in the Norwegian Industrial and Regional Development Fund, later named Innovation Norway following a merger.

Almlid has chaired the Central Norway Regional Health Authority from 2006 to 2012, and Nord-Trøndelag Elektrisitetsverk, and was a board member of Vinmonopolet from 1998 to 2000. In 2011 he became chair of Statnett.

He is the father of business executive and former newspaper editor Ole Erik Almlid.

Political offices
| Preceded by Arne Sandnes | County mayor of Nord-Trøndelag; 1991–1995 | Succeeded by Bjarne Håkon Hanssen |
Civic offices
| Preceded by Per Sævik | Chair of the Central Norway Regional Health Authority; 2006–2012 | Succeeded by Marthe Styve Holte |
| Preceded by Bjarne Aamodt | Chair of Statnett; 2011–present | Incumbent |
