= Gunnar Viken =

Norwegian politician

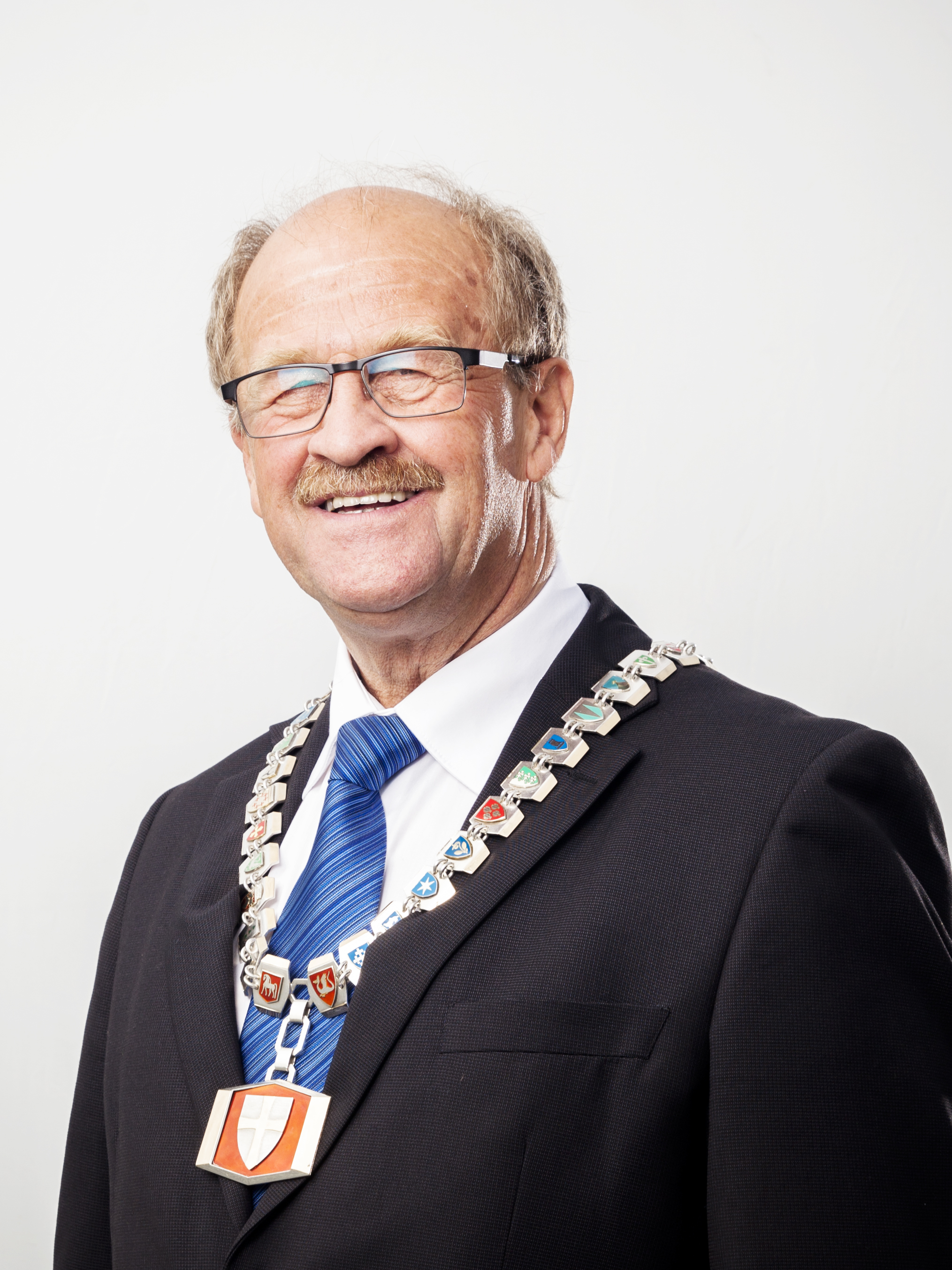

County mayor of Nord-Trøndelag
- In office 17 October 2007 – 2015
- Preceded by: Erik Bartnes

Personal details
- Born: 9 July 1948 (age 77) Mosvik Municipality, Norway
- Party: Conservative Party
- Profession: Dairy farmer

Gunnar Johannes Viken (born 9 July 1948 in Levanger) is a Norwegian dairy farmer and politician for the Conservative Party. Since 2007 he has been county mayor of Nord-Trøndelag County Municipality.

Viken has been a member of the Nord-Trøndelag County Council since 1999 and a deputy member of the Storting since 2013. Prior to his election as county mayor in 2007, he chaired the Conservative Party group in the county council for 4 years and the county agricultural board for 12 years. He entered politics as a member of the municipal council of Mosvik Municipality in the early 1980s. Viken did not seek his party's renomination to the county council in 2015.

Raised on a family farm in Mosvik Municipality, he passed the National Driving Teacher School and managed a driving school in Levanger Municipality from 1976 to 1982. Since 1982 he has been a dairy farmer and forester in Mosvik Municipality.

Political offices
Preceded by Erik Bartnes	County mayor of Nord-Trøndelag; 2007–2015	Succeeded by Pål Sæther Eiden
