= Ole Erik Almlid =

Norwegian newspaper editor and business executive

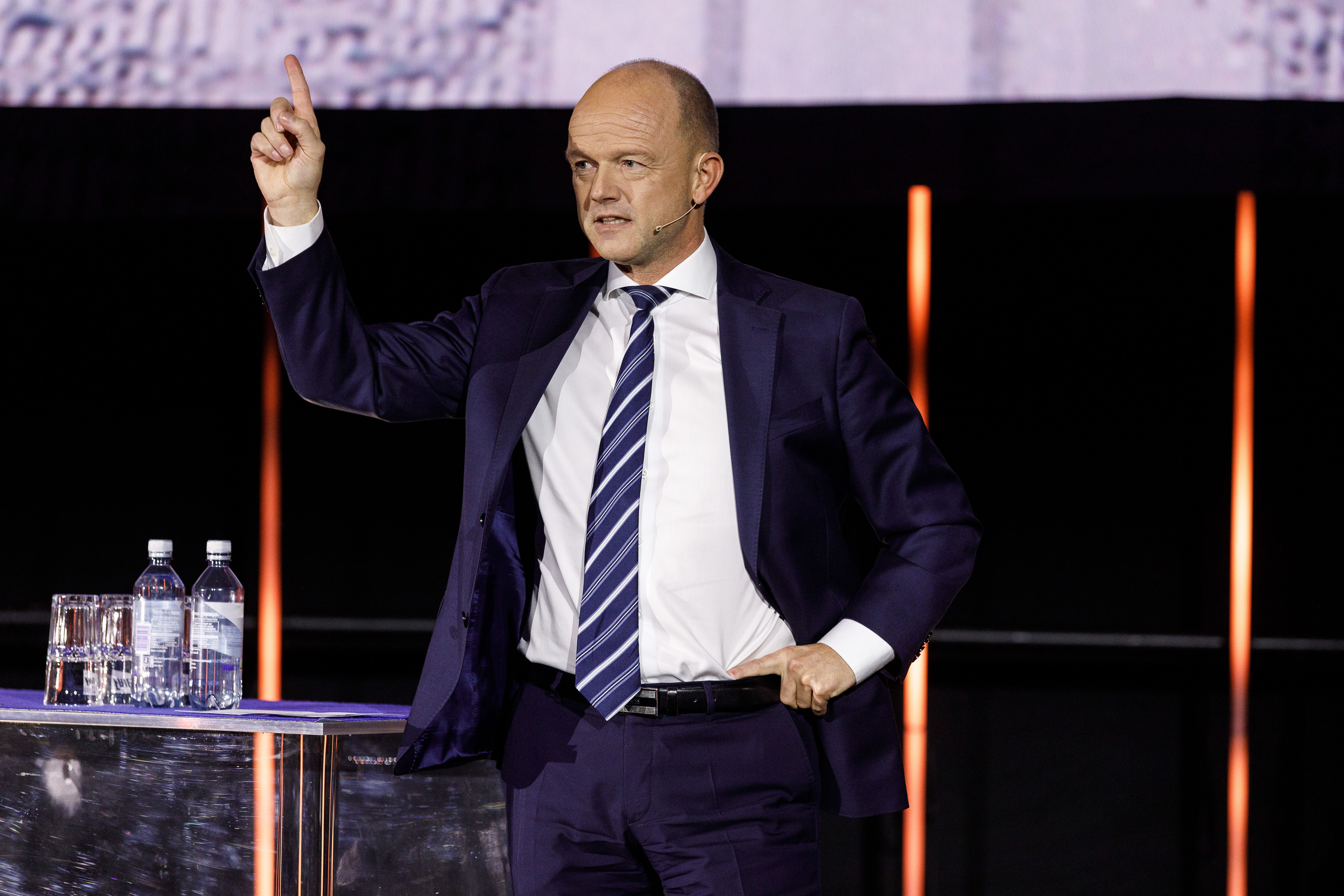
- Born: 1 December 1969 (age 56); Malm, Norway
- Education: Oslo University College
- Occupations: Newspaper editor and business executive
- Father: Kolbjørn Almlid

Ole Erik Almlid (born 1 December 1969) is a Norwegian business executive and former newspaper editor. He has been Director General of the Confederation of Norwegian Enterprise (NHO) since 2018.

== Life and career ==
Almlid was born in Malm (now Verran) on 1 December 1969. He is a son of politician Kolbjørn Almlid.

He graduated as journalist from the Oslo University College in 1996, and also studied political science and psychology. He worked as journalist for the Norwegian News Agency, and has been editor for the newspapers Trønder-Avisa and Hamar Dagblad, the news agency Avisenes Pressebyrå, and Østlendingen, and news editor for Aftenposten.

He was appointed by the Confederation of Norwegian Enterprise (NHO) in 2013, where he took over as chief executive in 2018, succeeding Kristin Skogen Lund.

Business positions
Preceded by Kristin Skogen Lund	Chief executive of the Confederation of Norwegian Enterprise; 2018–present	Incumbent
