= Arne Sandnes (Nord-Trøndelag) =

Norwegian politician

- Born: 2 March 1924; Snåsa Municipality, Norway
- Died: 23 May 2016 (aged 92); Nord-Trøndelag, Norway
- Occupation: Politician
- Relatives: Jørn Sandnes (brother)

Arne Sandnes (2 March 1924 – 23 May 2016) was a Norwegian politician for the Centre Party.

Sandnes was elected to the municipal council of Snåsa Municipality in 1952, and later became mayor. Sandnes served as county mayor of Nord-Trøndelag (1975–1991).

He was the brother of history professor Jørn Sandnes.

Political offices
| Preceded by Knut Aas | County mayor of Nord-Trøndelag; 1975–1991 | Succeeded by Kolbjørn Almlid |
