= Oluf A. Saugestad =

American politician

Oluf A. Saugestad (January 19, 1840 - December 17, 1926) was a member of the Wisconsin State Assembly.

== Biography ==
Saugestad was born in Beitstad in Nord-Trøndelag, Norway. In 1864, he graduated from the Veterinary College in Copenhagen, Denmark. On June 29, 1870, he married Karen E. Gravorok. They later had a daughter. Saugestad settled in the village of Baldwin in St. Croix County, Wisconsin during 1872. He initially followed the profession of veterinary surgeon. He also served as vice president of the Bank of Baldwin. He died at the age of 88 in Melrude, St. Louis County, Minnesota.

== Political career ==
Saugestad was elected a member of the Wisconsin State Assembly in 1882. He was an Independent Republican. Other public positions he held include Town Treasurer of Baldwin from 1876 to 1882 and Sheriff of St. Croix County, Wisconsin from 1893 to 1894.
