= Federation of Norwegian Construction Industries =

The Federation of Norwegian Construction Industries (BNL; from Norwegian: Byggenæringens Landsforening) is a business and employer policy organization for companies in the construction industry. BNL is an umbrella organization for 15 industries and has more than 4,100 member companies with 74,000 employees. BNL was established in 1997 and is currently the third largest association in the Confederation of Norwegian Enterprise (NHO).

BNL organizes both manufacturing companies, plumbers, carpenters, landscape gardeners, masons, painters, and entrepreneurs.
