= Øyvind Ruud =

Norwegian politician

Øyvind Ruud (30 December 1944 – 20 February 2015) was a Norwegian politician for the Christian Democratic Party.

He served as a deputy representative to the Parliament of Norway from Akershus during the term 1993–1997. He most notably was the county mayor of Akershus from 1988 to 1991.

Political offices
Preceded by Tore Haugen	County mayor of Akershus; 1988–1991	Succeeded by Ragnar Kristoffersen
