= Erling Østerberg =

Norwegian police officer (1901–1981)

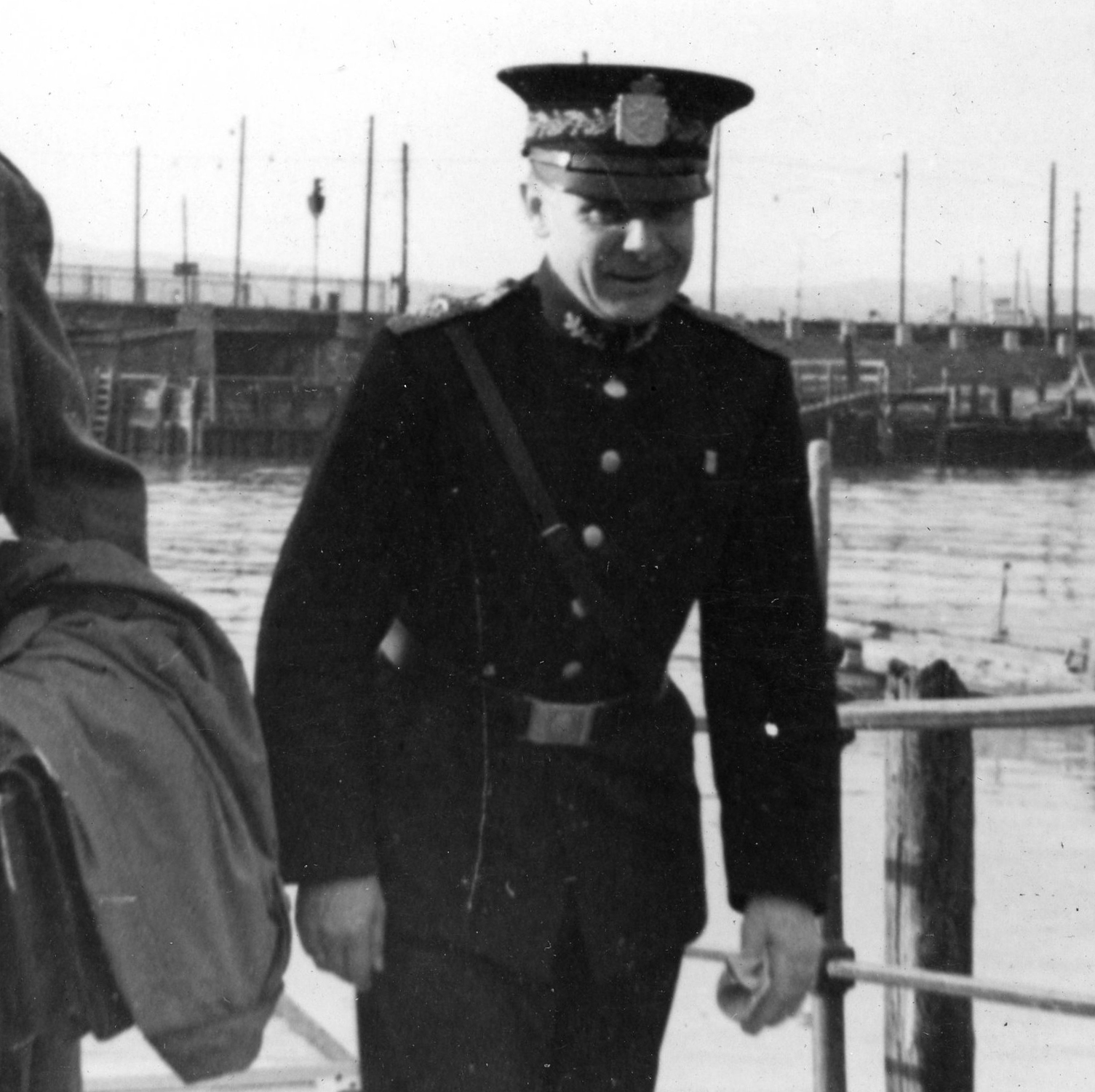
- Erling Østerberg in Trondheim, 1945
- Born: 2 November 1901; Beitstad, Norway
- Died: 11 September 1981 (aged 79)
- Occupation: police officer
- Children: Dag Østerberg
- Awards: Order of St. Olav

Erling Østerberg (2 November 1901 – 11 September 1981) was a Norwegian police officer.

He was born in Beitstad, and was the father of sociologist Dag Østerberg. During the German occupation of Norway he was active in preventing Nazification of the police corps, was arrested at the Martial law in Trondheim in 1942, incarcerated at the Falstad concentration camp for some months, and subsequently expelled from the city. He served as police chief in Trondheim for 26 years, from 1945 to 1971. He was member of several public commissions and committees, and served as board member of various companies. He was decorated Knight, First Class of the Order of St. Olav in 1964, and was Commander of the Yugoslavian Order of the Flag.
