= Dannebrogordenens Hæderstegn =

Danish meritous award

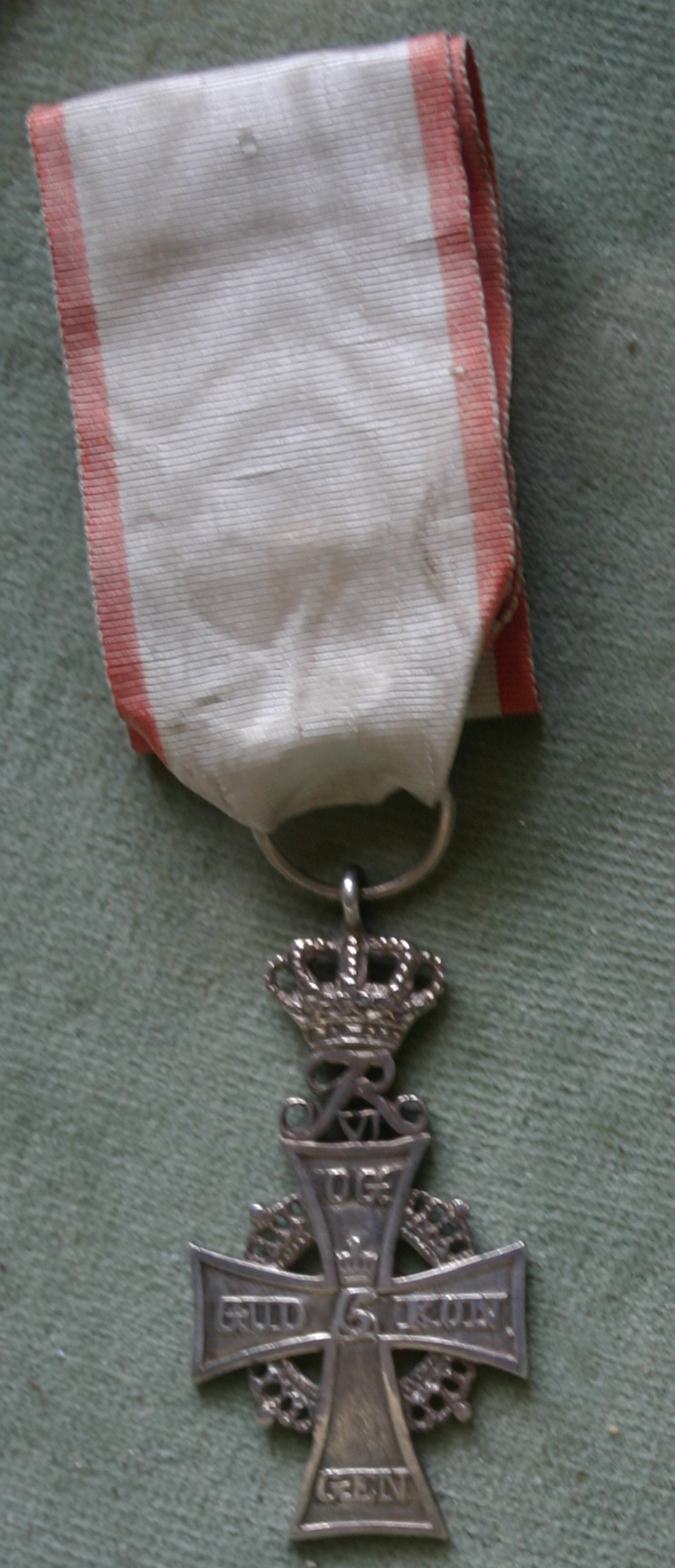
An example of Dannebrogsmændenes Hæderstegn from the reign of Frederick VI of Denmark

Dannebrogordenens Hæderstegn, also referred to as the Cross of Honour of the Order of the Dannebrog (post-nominals: D.Ht.), is a meritous award connected to the Danish Order of the Dannebrog. The cross was instituted by King Frederick VI of Denmark and Norway on 28 June 1808, and was named Dannebrogsmændenes Hæderstegn (D.M.) until 1952.

The cross may be awarded to Danes who have provided a service to "the fatherland" through a noble deed. It is also worn by the individual members of the royal family. The cross is of lesser rank than the Order of the Dannebrog, but is considered an additional recognition if awarded (and in modern times it is only awarded) to someone who is already a holder of the Order.

== Design ==
The cross is identical to the knight's cross of the Order of the Dannebrog, except in plain silver; it is worn on a ribbon (gentlemen) or bow (ladies) of the Order, white with red edges, nowadays with rosette, on the left chest.

== Notable recipients ==
- Princess Benedikte of Denmark
- Rudolph Bergh
- C. L. David
- Valdemar Irminger
- Henning Jakob Henrik Lund
- Dirch Passer
- Anton Rosen
- Daniel Larsen Schevig
