= Siri Hov Eggen =

Norwegian politician (born 1969)

Siri Hov Eggen (born 8 December 1969) is a Norwegian politician for the Labour Party.

She served as a deputy representative to the Parliament of Norway from Akershus during the terms 2001–2005 and 2009–2013.

She hails from Vestby. In 2012 she became a member of Akershus University Hospital. She has also been deputy county mayor of Akershus.
