= Dag Østerberg =

Norwegian sociologist, philosopher and musicologist

- Born: 9 November 1938; Trondheim, Norway
- Died: 22 February 2017 (aged 78)
- Occupation(s): Sociologist, philosopher and musicologist
- Employer: University of Oslo
- Parent: Erling Østerberg

Dag Østerberg (9 November 1938 – 22 February 2017) was a Norwegian sociologist, philosopher and musicologist.

He was born in Trondheim to police officer Erling Østerberg and Jørgine Sofie Kleven. He was a central contributor to the so-called positivism debate in the 1960s and 1970s. From 1981 to 1991 he was appointed professor in sociology at the University of Oslo. Among his works are Metasosiologisk Essay from 1963, Makt og materiell from 1971, and a biography of Jean-Paul Sartre from 1993. His 1966 work Forståelsesformer. Et filosofisk bidrag (Forms of Understanding: A Philosophical Contribution) was selected for the Norwegian Sociology Canon in 2009–2011.
