= Thor Gystad =

Norwegian politician

Thor Gystad (born 3 August 1919 in Ullensaker, died 15 June 2007) was a Norwegian politician for the Labour Party.

He was elected to the Norwegian Parliament from Akershus in 1969, and was re-elected on two occasions.

On the local level he was a member of Ullensaker city council from 1951 to 1971 and 1979 to 1983, serving as mayor from 1959 to 1969. From 1959 to 1969 he was also a member of Akershus county council, serving as county mayor from 1963 to 1969.

Preceded by post created	County mayor of Akershus; 1963–1969	Succeeded by Kjell Knudsen
