= Jorunn Aanderaa =

Norwegian poet (1945–2025)

Jorunn Aanderaa (12 September 1934 – 25 May 2025) was a Norwegian poet.

== Life ==
Jorunn Aanderaa was born on 12 September 1934 in Beitstad, Trøndelag county, Norway, the eighth of twelve children.

She died on 25 May 2025, after living with dementia for many years. Her funeral service was held at Uranienborg church on 10 June 2025.

== Writing ==
Aanderaa's 1966 Hansen på jorden has been described as "one of the few collections of concrete poetry in Norwegian literature". She followed it with a novella, Tidssignalet (1967) and another book of poetry, Til (1969). Her fourth and final book was published in 2024: Rat-a-tat-tat! has the subtitle Nye og gamle dikt [New and old poems] and includes work from her three earlier books and previously unpublished work, with an afterword by Eldrid Lunden.

She was associated with the Profil group.

Prints from Hansen på jorden were included in an exhibition "Sound Versus System: works on paper, visual poetry and other works" in Oslo's Kunsthalle.

After 1969 she was said to have "withdrawn from the literary spotlight", but on her 90th birthday in 2024 she was described as "one of the great avant-gardists of her generation".

== Selected publications ==
- Aanderaa, Jorunn (1966). Hansen på jorden. Et symfonisk dikt [Hansen on Earth. A symphonic poem]. Oslo: Aschehoug.
- Aanderaa, Jorunn (1967). Tidssignalet. Miniroman [The Signal of Time: a mini-novel]. Oslo: Aschehoug.
- Aanderaa, Jorunn (1969). Til : En samling tekster [To: A Collection of Texts]. Oslo: Aschehoug.
- Aanderaa, Jorunn (2012). Rat-a-tat-tat! Nye og gamle dikt [New and old poems]. Flamme. ISBN 9788282880077.
