= Tore Haugen =

Norwegian politician (born 1931)

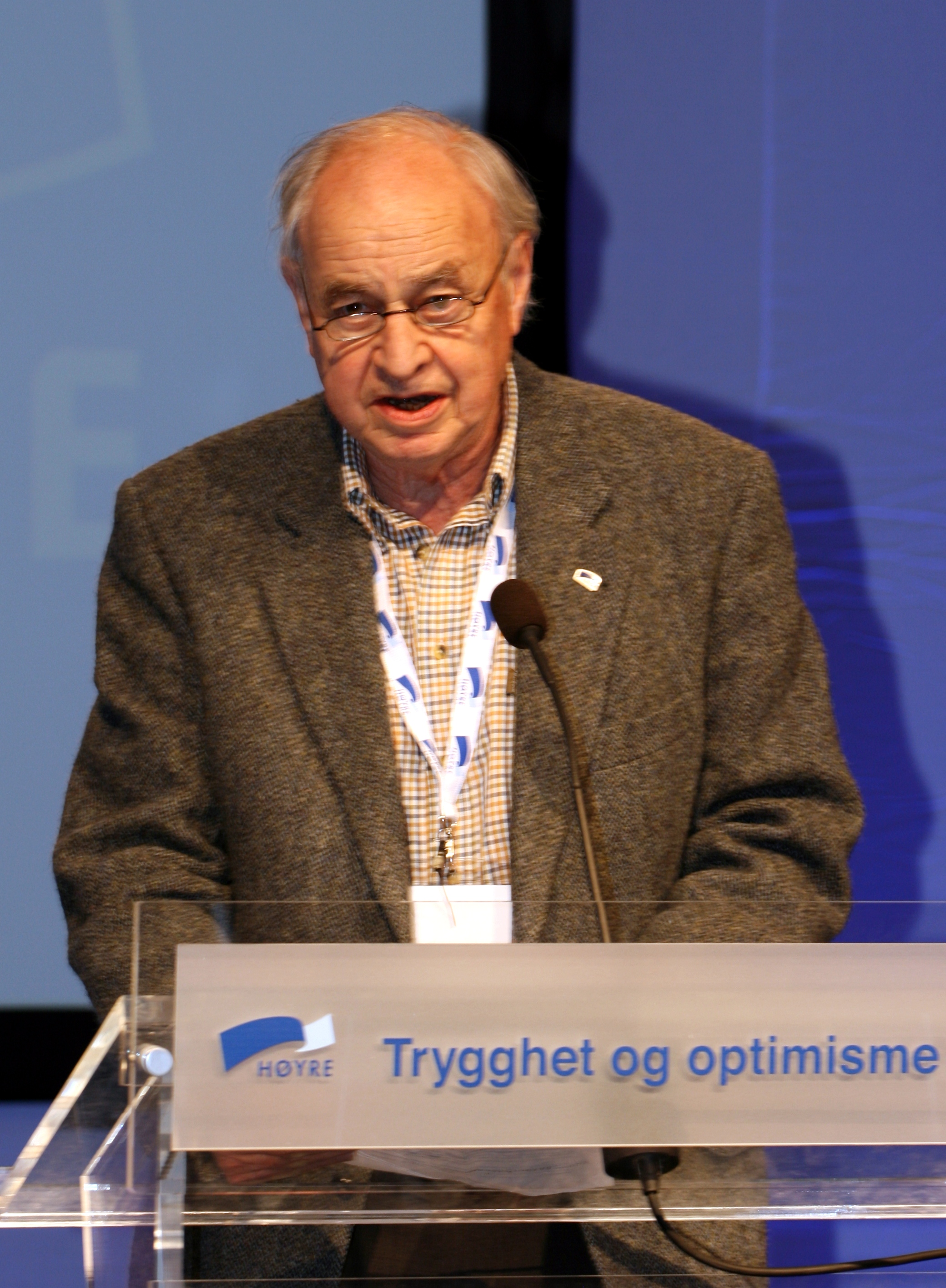
Tore Haugen (2009)

Tore Haugen (1 October 1931 – 23 May 2025) was a Norwegian politician for the Conservative Party.

== Career ==
Born in Askim on 1 October 1931, Haugen was elected to the Norwegian Parliament from Akershus in 1989, and was re-elected on one occasion. He represented the Conservative Party. He had previously served in the position of deputy representative during the term 1977–1981.

Haugen was a deputy member of Oppegård municipality council in 1963–1967, but became mayor in the periods 1969–1971 and 1971–1975. He was a member of Akershus county council in 1969–1971, and later served as county mayor during the terms 1979–1983 and 1983–1987.

Outside politics he graduated with the cand.jur. degree in 1958 and spent most of his professional career in Prisdirektoratet. He was appointed to the Office of the Auditor General of Norway from 1994 to 2002. He was also chairman of the board of the Norwegian State Railways from 1984 to 1989.

Haugen died on 23 May 2025, at the age of 93.

Preceded by Thorleif Løken	County mayor of Akershus; 1980–1987	Succeeded by Øyvind Ruud
Preceded by	Chair of the Norwegian State Railways; 1984–1989	Succeeded by Liv Torjusen
