= Jørn Sandnes =

Norwegian historian (1926–2007)

Jørn Sandnes (3 May 1926 – 12 April 2007) was a Norwegian historian. He was born in Snåsa Municipality in Nord-Trøndelag. He was appointed Professor in Trondheim from 1975 to 1992, From 1984 he served as the first rector at the University of Trondheim. Among his works is Norsk Stadnamnleksikon from 1976 (jointly with Ola Stemshaug), and Avfolking og union, volume four of Cappelens Norgeshistorie from 1977. He was the principal editor of the six volumes of Trondheims historie from 1997.

Sandnes was the younger brother of politician Arne Sandnes.
