= Daniel Larsen Schevig =

Norwegian politician

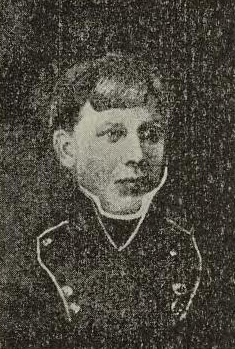
Daniel Larsen Schevig (1786 –1833); Norwegian farmer, military officer and constitutional founding father

Daniel Larsen Schevig (1786 – 6 October 1833) was a Norwegian military officer and constitutional founding father.

He was born at the farm Gladsjø in Beitstad, and spent his career as a farmer on Skjevik farm. He was a sergeant in the Norwegian Army, and received the Dannebrogordenens Hæderstegn in 1808 for his war efforts at Duved skanse. He was also a member of the Norwegian Constituent Assembly, representing 1. Trondhjemske Infanteriregiment. Halvdan Koht notes that Schevig "probably" favored Norwegian independence over a union with another country. Schevig was married in November 1811, and died on his farm in October 1833.
