= Confederation of Norwegian Enterprise =

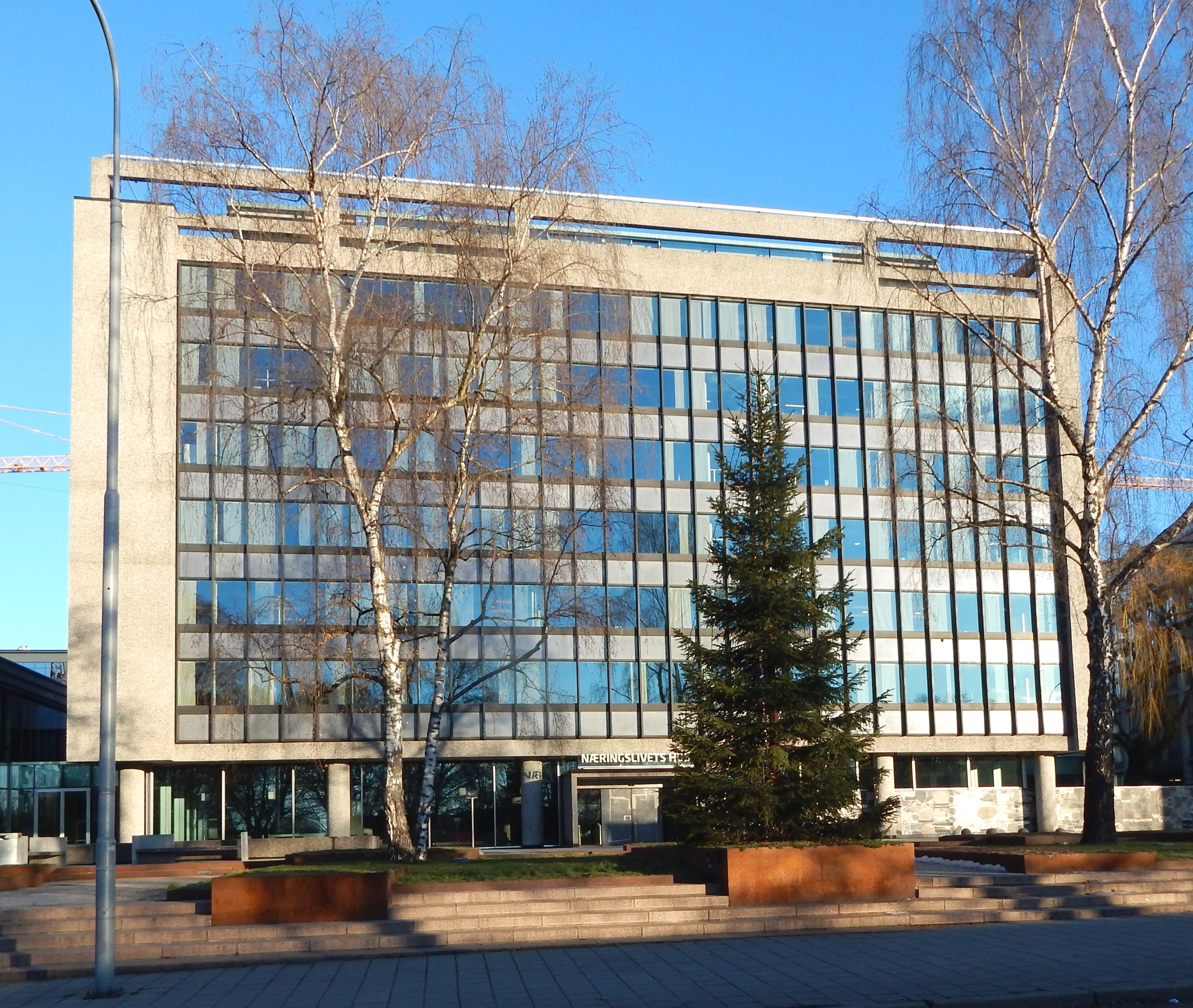
- Established: 28 November 1988 (37 years ago)
- Country: Norway
- Coordinates: 59°56′N 10°43′E
- Chairpersons: Svein Tore Holsether

The Confederation of Norwegian Enterprise (Norwegian: Næringslivets Hovedorganisasjon, NHO) is an employers' organisation in Norway with more than 30,000 members.

It was founded in 1989 as a merger of the Federation of Norwegian Industries, the Norwegian Employers' Confederation and the Federation of Norwegian Craftsmen.

The president is Svein Tore Holsether and the director general is Ole Erik Almlid. The executive directors are Anniken Hauglie, Nina Melsom, Øystein Dørum, Peter Markovski, Gjermund Løyning, Christian Chramer, Kåre Anda Aronsen, Vibeke Østensjø and Maria Dahlstrøm.

== See also ==
- Federation of Norwegian Construction Industries
