= Nord-Trøndelag County Municipality =

Coordinates: 64°00′52″N 11°28′54″E

Nord-Trøndelag County Municipality Nord-Trøndelag fylkeskommune
- Former County
- Coat of arms

- Location in Norway
- Country: Norway
- Disestablished: 1 Jan 2018
- Administrative center: Steinkjer

Government
  - County mayor: Gunnar Viken
  - Chairman of Cabinet: Anne Marit Mevassvik
- ISO 3166 code: NO-17
- Revenue: NOK 1,800 million
- Employees: 1,700
- Schools: 12
- Pupils: 7,000
- Transit authority: None
- Roads: 1,771 km (1,100 mi)
- Website: www.ntfk.no

Nord-Trøndelag County Municipality (Norwegian: Nord-Trøndelag fylkeskommune) was the regional governing administration of the old Nord-Trøndelag county in Norway. The county municipality was established in its current form on 1 January 1976 when the law was changed to allow elected county councils in Norway. The county municipality was dissolved on 1 January 2018, when Nord-Trøndelag was merged with the neighboring Sør-Trøndelag county, creating the new Trøndelag county which is led by the Trøndelag County Municipality.

The main responsibilities of the county municipality included the running of 12 upper secondary schools, with 7,000 pupils. It administered the 1,771 kilometres (1,100 mi) of county roadways, public transport, dental care, culture and cultural heritage. The administration is located in Steinkjer.

== County government ==
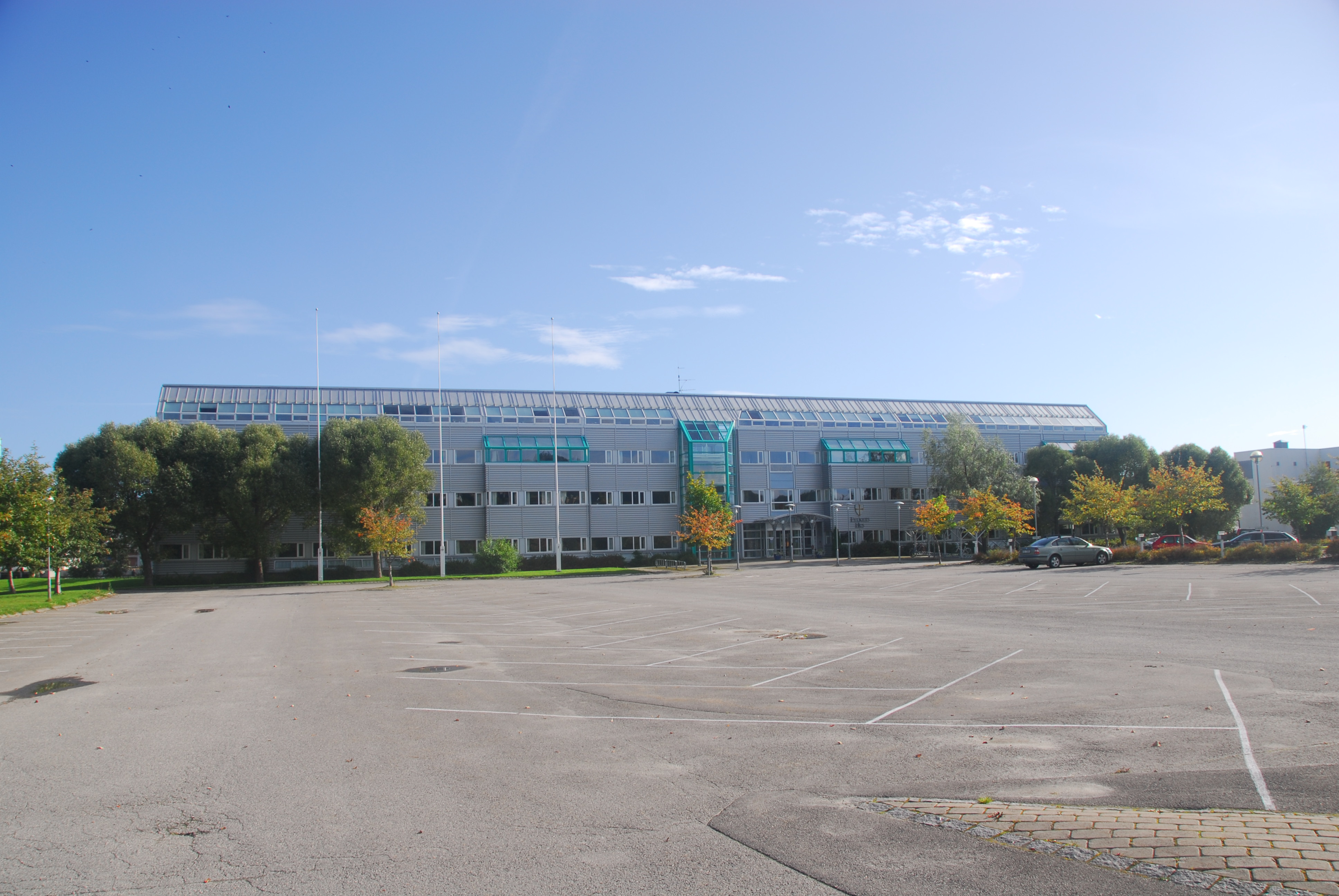
The administration building in Steinkjer

The Nord-Trøndelag county council (Norwegian: Fylkestinget) was made up of 35 representatives that were elected every four years. The council essentially acted as a Parliament or legislative body for the county and it met several times each year. The council was led by the County Mayor (fylkesordfører) who held the executive powers of the county along with a smaller group known as the county cabinet. The last county mayor of Nord-Trøndelag, was Gunnar Viken (Conservative Party) while his deputy is Johannes Sandstad (Christian Democratic Party). The county cabinet was led by Anne Marit Mevassvik and has four members, from the Labour Party, the Conservative Party and the Christian Democratic Party.

=== County cabinet chairmen ===
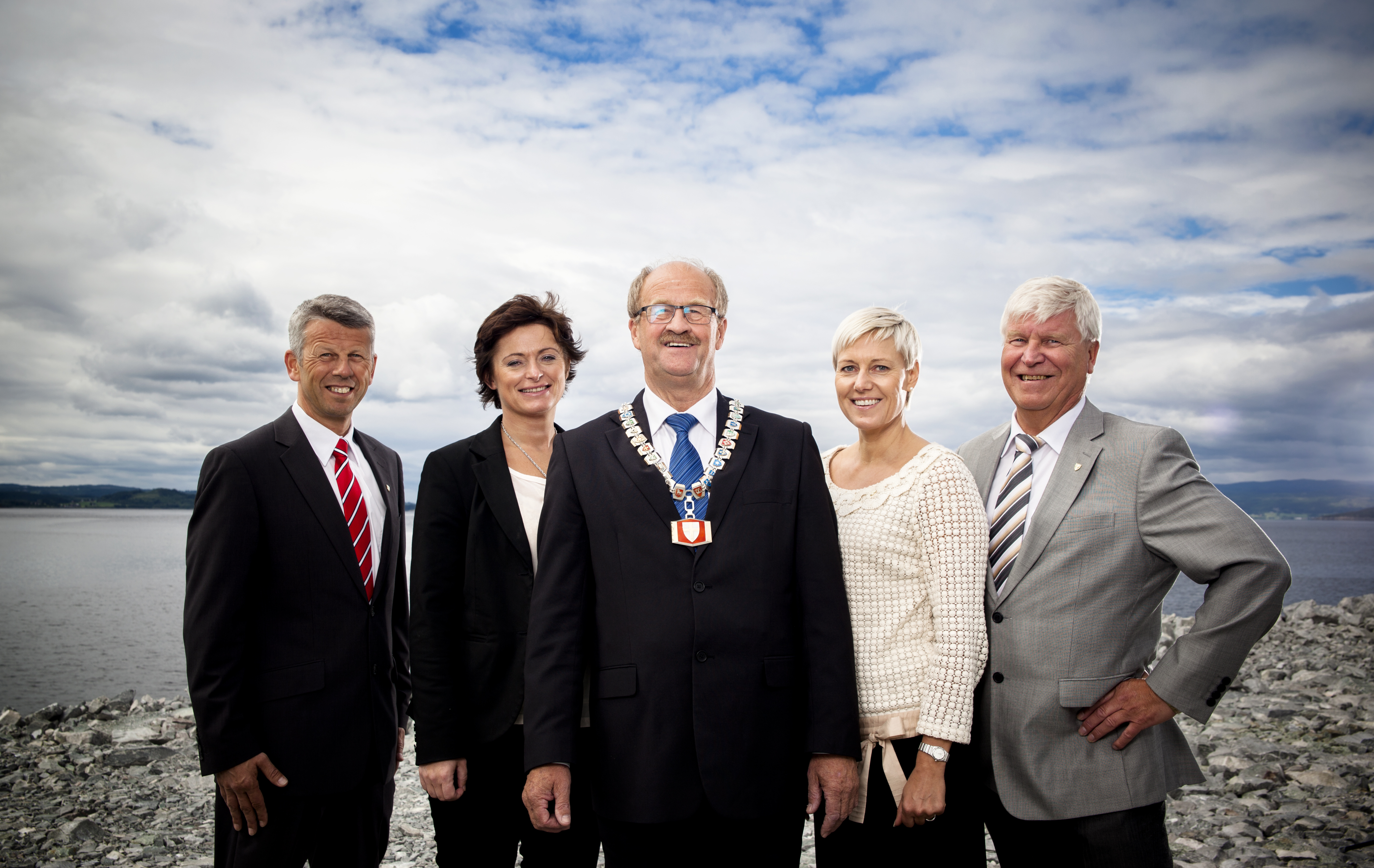
County mayor Gunnar Viken and the members of the county cabinet. From the left: Sørvik, Lagesen, Mevassvik and Jensen

- 2003–2011 Alf Daniel Moen, Labour Party
- 2011–2013 Ingvild Kjerkol, Labour Party
- 2013–2017 Anne Marit Mevassvik, Labour Party

=== County mayors ===
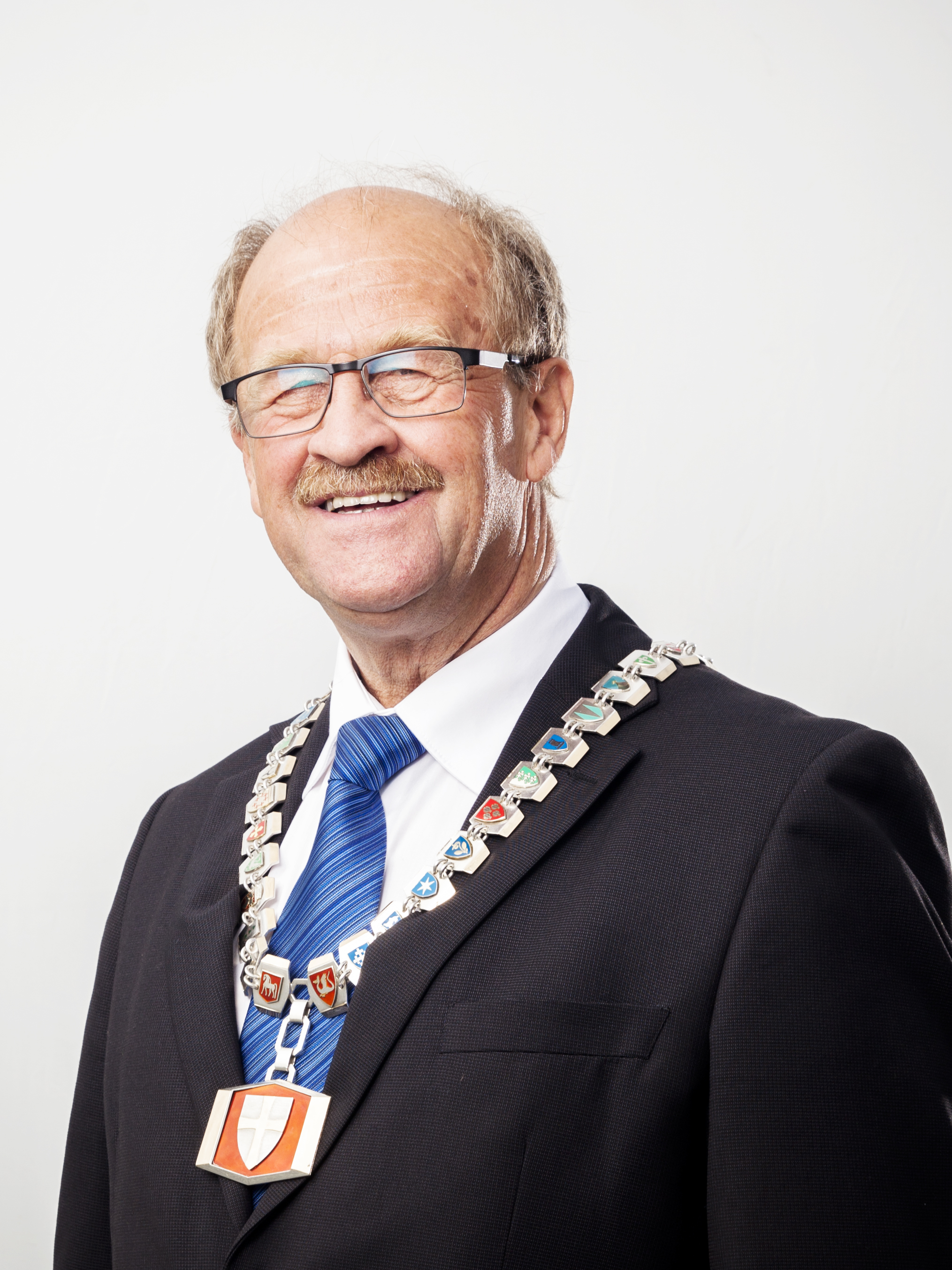
Gunnar Viken of the Conservative Party has been county mayor from 2007-2017

- 1963–1966 Johan A. Vikan, Centre Party
- 1966–1967 Olav Benum, Liberal Party
- 1968–1975 Knut Aas, Centre Party
- 1976–1991 Arne Sandnes, Centre Party
- 1992–1995 Kolbjørn Almlid, Centre Party
- 1995–1997 Bjarne Håkon Hanssen, Labour Party
- 1997–2003 Merethe Storødegård, Labour Party
- 2003–2007 Erik Bartnes, Centre Party
- 2007–2017 Gunnar Viken, Conservative Party

=== Deputy county mayors ===
- 1963 Martin Mørkved, Liberal Party
- 1964–1966 Olav Benum, Liberal Party
- 1968–1971 Petter Vekterli, Christian Democratic Party
- 1972–1979 Jarle Haugan, Liberal Party
- 1980–1987 Jon Åby, Liberal Party
- 1988–1991 Håvard Alstadheim, Liberal Party
- 1992–1995 Osvald Løberg, Socialist Left Party
- 1995–2003 Astri Wessel, Christian Democratic Party
- 2003–2011 Åse Marie Hagen, Labour Party
- 2011–2017 Johannes Sandstad, Christian Democratic Party

=== County council ===
The party breakdown of the council was as follows:

Nord-Trøndelag fylkesting 2016–2017
Party name (in Norwegian)	Number of representatives
Labour Party (Arbeiderpartiet)	14
Progress Party (Fremskrittspartiet)	2
Green Party (Miljøpartiet De Grønne)	1
Conservative Party (Høyre)	4
Christian Democratic Party (Kristelig Folkeparti)	1
Centre Party (Senterpartiet)	10
Socialist Left Party (Sosialistisk Venstreparti)	2
Liberal Party (Venstre)	1
Total number of members:	35

Nord-Trøndelag fylkesting 2012–2015
Party name (in Norwegian)	Number of representatives
Labour Party (Arbeiderpartiet)	15
Progress Party (Fremskrittspartiet)	3
Conservative Party (Høyre)	5
Christian Democratic Party (Kristelig Folkeparti)	1
Centre Party (Senterpartiet)	7
Socialist Left Party (Sosialistisk Venstreparti)	2
Liberal Party (Venstre)	2
Total number of members:	35

Nord-Trøndelag fylkesting 2008–2011
Party name (in Norwegian)	Number of representatives
Labour Party (Arbeiderpartiet)	13
Progress Party (Fremskrittspartiet)	5
Conservative Party (Høyre)	3
Christian Democratic Party (Kristelig Folkeparti)	2
Centre Party (Senterpartiet)	7
Socialist Left Party (Sosialistisk Venstreparti)	3
Liberal Party (Venstre)	2
Total number of members:	35

Nord-Trøndelag fylkesting 2004–2007
Party name (in Norwegian)	Number of representatives
Labour Party (Arbeiderpartiet)	12
Progress Party (Fremskrittspartiet)	3
Conservative Party (Høyre)	3
Christian Democratic Party (Kristelig Folkeparti)	2
Centre Party (Senterpartiet)	8
Socialist Left Party (Sosialistisk Venstreparti)	5
Liberal Party (Venstre)	2
Total number of members:	35

Nord-Trøndelag fylkesting 2000–2003
Party name (in Norwegian)	Number of representatives
Labour Party (Arbeiderpartiet)	18
Progress Party (Fremskrittspartiet)	3
Conservative Party (Høyre)	4
Christian Democratic Party (Kristelig Folkeparti)	3
Centre Party (Senterpartiet)	10
Socialist Left Party (Sosialistisk Venstreparti)	5
Liberal Party (Venstre)	2
Total number of members:	45

Nord-Trøndelag fylkesting 1996–1999
Party name (in Norwegian)	Number of representatives
Labour Party (Arbeiderpartiet)	17
Progress Party (Fremskrittspartiet)	2
Conservative Party (Høyre)	4
Christian Democratic Party (Kristelig Folkeparti)	2
Centre Party (Senterpartiet)	15
Socialist Left Party (Sosialistisk Venstreparti)	3
Liberal Party (Venstre)	2
Total number of members:	45

Nord-Trøndelag fylkesting 1992–1995
Party name (in Norwegian)	Number of representatives
Labour Party (Arbeiderpartiet)	16
Progress Party (Fremskrittspartiet)	1
Conservative Party (Høyre)	4
Christian Democratic Party (Kristelig Folkeparti)	2
Centre Party (Senterpartiet)	14
Socialist Left Party (Sosialistisk Venstreparti)	6
Liberal Party (Venstre)	2
Total number of members:	45

Nord-Trøndelag fylkesting 1988–1991
Party name (in Norwegian)	Number of representatives
Labour Party (Arbeiderpartiet)	19
Progress Party (Fremskrittspartiet)	3
Conservative Party (Høyre)	5
Christian Democratic Party (Kristelig Folkeparti)	2
Centre Party (Senterpartiet)	10
Socialist Left Party (Sosialistisk Venstreparti)	3
Liberal Party (Venstre)	3
Total number of members:	45

Nord-Trøndelag fylkesting 1984–1987
Party name (in Norwegian)	Number of representatives
Labour Party (Arbeiderpartiet)	19
Progress Party (Fremskrittspartiet)	1
Conservative Party (Høyre)	6
Christian Democratic Party (Kristelig Folkeparti)	3
Centre Party (Senterpartiet)	10
Socialist Left Party (Sosialistisk Venstreparti)	2
Liberal Party (Venstre)	4
Total number of members:	45

Nord-Trøndelag fylkesting 1980–1983
Party name (in Norwegian)	Number of representatives
Labour Party (Arbeiderpartiet)	19
Conservative Party (Høyre)	6
Christian Democratic Party (Kristelig Folkeparti)	3
Liberal People's Party (Liberale Folkepartiet)	1
Centre Party (Senterpartiet)	10
Socialist Left Party (Sosialistisk Venstreparti)	2
Liberal Party (Venstre)	4
Total number of members:	45

Nord-Trøndelag fylkesting 1976–1979
Party name (in Norwegian)	Number of representatives
Labour Party (Arbeiderpartiet)	18
Conservative Party (Høyre)	4
Christian Democratic Party (Kristelig Folkeparti)	4
New People's Party (Nye Folkepartiet)	2
Centre Party (Senterpartiet)	11
Socialist Left Party (Sosialistisk Venstreparti)	2
Liberal Party (Venstre)	4
Total number of members:	45

== Schools ==
- Grong Upper Secondary School
- Inderøy Upper Secondary School
- Leksvik Upper Secondary School
- Levanger Upper Secondary School
- Meråker Upper Secondary School
- Mære Agriculture School
- Olav Duun Upper Secondary School
- Steinkjer Upper Secondary School
- Verdal Upper Secondary School
- Ytre Namdal Upper Secondary School

== Subsidiaries ==
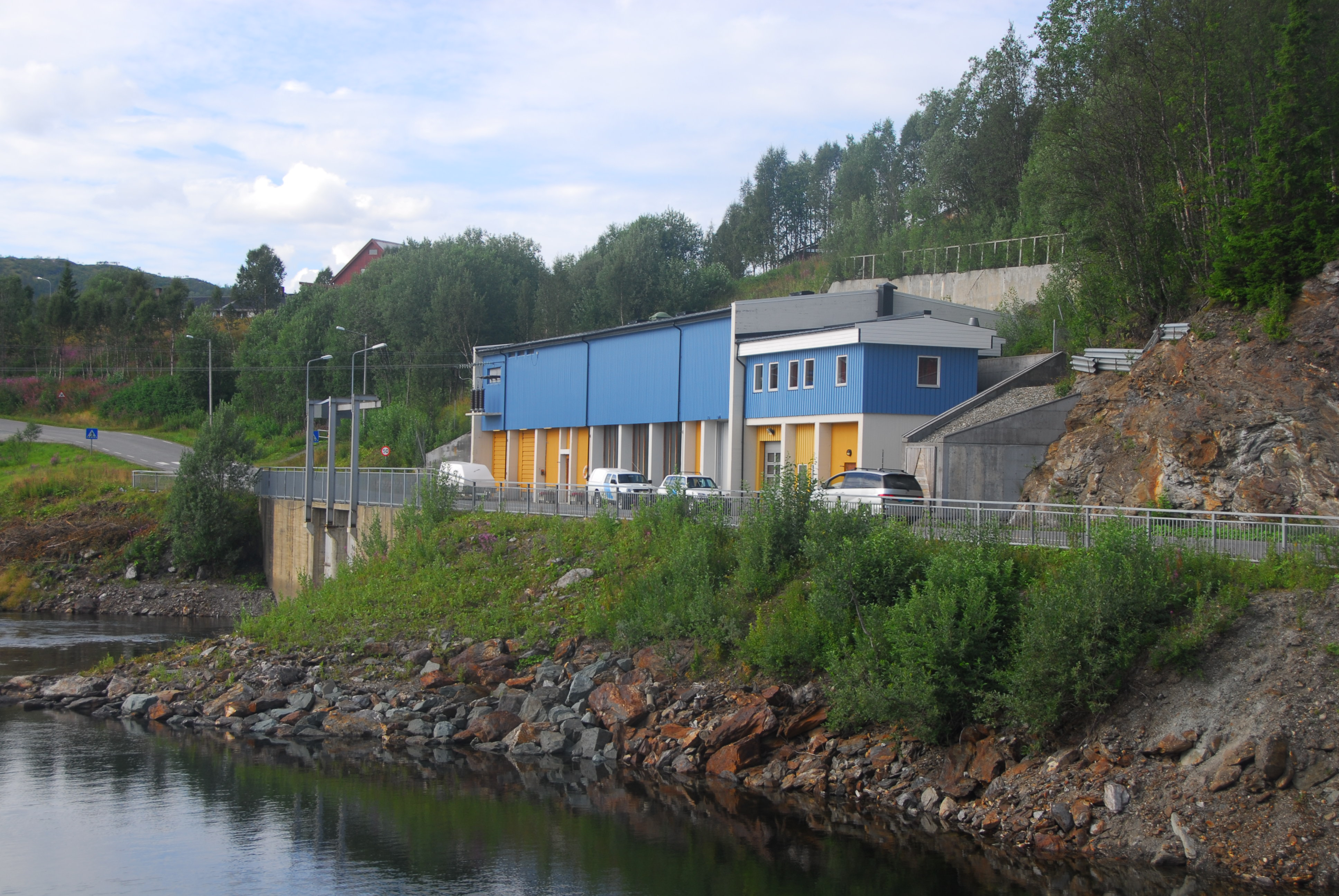
A county-owned power station in Røyrvik Municipality

- Nord-Trøndelag County Gallery (Gallery)
- Nord-Trøndelag Elektrisitetsverk (Power company)
- Nord-Trøndelag Theatre (Theatre)
- TrønderBilene (34%, Bus company)
