= Inge Einarsen Bartnes =

Norwegian politician (1911–1988)

Inge Einarsen Bartnes (22 September 1911 – 16 January 1988) was a Norwegian politician for the Centre Party.

He was born in Beitstad. He is the father of Erik Bartnes and grandfather of Inge Bartnes and Lars Erik Bartnes.

He was elected to the Norwegian Parliament from Nord-Trøndelag in 1954, and was re-elected on four occasions.

Bartnes was deputy mayor of Beitstad Municipality in 1947–1951 and 1951–1954.
