= Akershus County Municipality =

Akershus County Municipality Akershus fylkeskommune
- County municipality
- Coat of arms

- Location in Norway
- Coordinates: 59°54′43.18″N 10°45′19.83″E
- Country: Norway
- Administrative center: Oslo

Government
  - County mayor: Anette Solli
- ISO 3166 code: NO-02
- Employees: 4,000
- Schools: 35
- Pupils: 20,000
- Transit authority: Ruter
- Website: www.akershus.no

Akershus County Municipality (Norwegian: Akershus fylkeskommune) is the regional governing administration of Akershus county in Norway. The county municipality was established in its most early form on 1 January 1976 when the law was changed to allow elected county councils in Norway. The county municipality was dissolved on 1 January 2020, when Akershus was merged with the neighboring counties of Buskerud and Østfold, creating the new Viken county which is led by the Viken County Municipality. The administrative seat is located in Oslo (which was not part of Akershus) and the county mayor was Anette Solli. On 1 January 2024, Akershus was re-established as an independent county with expanded borders due to municipal amalgamations in 2020, which will not be reversed.

The main responsibilities of the county municipality included the running of the 35 upper secondary schools. It managed all the county roadways, public transport, dental care, culture, and cultural heritage sites in the county.

== Transport ==
Public transport in Akershus is managed by Ruter, a transit authority owned along with the City of Oslo. It markets all public transport except the Oslo Commuter Rail in Akershus, though operations are provided by private companies based on public service obligation.

== County government ==
The county council (Norwegian: Fylkestinget) is made up of 43 representatives that are elected every four years. The council essentially acts as a parliament or legislative body for the county and it meets several times each year. The council is divided into standing committees and an executive board (fylkesutvalg) which meet considerably more often. Both the council and executive board are led by the county mayor (fylkesordfører) who holds the executive powers of the county.

=== County mayors ===
- 1 Jan 1963–31 Dec 1968: Thor Gystad (Labour Party)
- 1 Jan 1969–31 Dec 1975: Kjell Knudsen (Labour Party)
- 1 Jan 1976–31 Dec 1979: Thorleif Løken (Conservative Party)
- 1 Jan 1980–31 Dec 1987: Tore Haugen (Conservative Party)
- 1 Jan 1988–31 Dec 1991: Øyvind Ruud (Christian Democratic Party)
- 1 Jan 1992–31 Dec 2003: Ragnar Kristoffersen (Labour Party)
- 1 Jan 2004–31 Dec 2007: Hildur Horn Øien (Christian Democratic Party)
- 1 Jan 2008–31 Dec 2013: Nils Aage Jegstad (Conservative Party)
- 1 Jan 2014–31 Dec 2019: Anette Solli (Conservative Party)
- 1 Jan 2020–31 Dec 2023: None (County merged with Viken, but was re-established in 2024)
- 1 Jan 2024– : Thomas Sjøvold (Conservative Party)

=== County council ===
The party breakdown of the council is as follows:

Akershus fylkesting 2024–2027
Party name (in Norwegian)	Number of representatives
Labour Party (Arbeiderpartiet)	10
Progress Party (Fremskrittspartiet)	6
Green Party (Miljøpartiet De Grønne)	3
Conservative Party (Høyre)	19
Industry and Business Party (Industri‑ og Næringspartiet)	1
Christian Democratic Party (Kristelig Folkeparti)	1
Pensioners' Party (Pensjonistpartiet)	1
Red Party (Rødt)	2
Centre Party (Senterpartiet)	2
Socialist Left Party (Sosialistisk Venstreparti)	3
Liberal Party (Venstre)	3
Total number of members:	51

Akershus fylkesting 2015–2019
Party name (in Norwegian)	Number of representatives
Labour Party (Arbeiderpartiet)	14
Progress Party (Fremskrittspartiet)	5
Green Party (Miljøpartiet De Grønne)	3
Conservative Party (Høyre)	14
Christian Democratic Party (Kristelig Folkeparti)	1
Centre Party (Senterpartiet)	2
Socialist Left Party (Sosialistisk Venstreparti)	1
Liberal Party (Venstre)	3
Total number of members:	43

Akershus fylkesting 2012–2015
Party name (in Norwegian)	Number of representatives
Labour Party (Arbeiderpartiet)	14
Progress Party (Fremskrittspartiet)	5
Conservative Party (Høyre)	17
Christian Democratic Party (Kristelig Folkeparti)	1
Centre Party (Senterpartiet)	1
Socialist Left Party (Sosialistisk Venstreparti)	2
Liberal Party (Venstre)	3
Total number of members:	43

Akershus fylkesting 2008–2011
Party name (in Norwegian)	Number of representatives
Labour Party (Arbeiderpartiet)	12
Progress Party (Fremskrittspartiet)	9
Conservative Party (Høyre)	12
Christian Democratic Party (Kristelig Folkeparti)	2
Centre Party (Senterpartiet)	2
Socialist Left Party (Sosialistisk Venstreparti)	3
Liberal Party (Venstre)	3
Total number of members:	43

Akershus fylkesting 2004–2007
Party name (in Norwegian)	Number of representatives
Labour Party (Arbeiderpartiet)	11
Progress Party (Fremskrittspartiet)	8
Conservative Party (Høyre)	11
Christian Democratic Party (Kristelig Folkeparti)	2
Centre Party (Senterpartiet)	2
Socialist Left Party (Sosialistisk Venstreparti)	6
Liberal Party (Venstre)	2
Total number of members:	43

Akershus fylkesting 2000–2003
Party name (in Norwegian)	Number of representatives
Labour Party (Arbeiderpartiet)	19
Progress Party (Fremskrittspartiet)	9
Green Party (Miljøpartiet De Grønne)	1
Conservative Party (Høyre)	16
Christian Democratic Party (Kristelig Folkeparti)	4
Pensioners' Party (Pensjonistpartiet)	1
Red Electoral Alliance (Rød Valgallianse)	1
Centre Party (Senterpartiet)	3
Socialist Left Party (Sosialistisk Venstreparti)	6
Liberal Party (Venstre)	3
Total number of members:	63

Akershus fylkesting 1996–1999
Party name (in Norwegian)	Number of representatives
Labour Party (Arbeiderpartiet)	20
Progress Party (Fremskrittspartiet)	9
Conservative Party (Høyre)	19
Christian Democratic Party (Kristelig Folkeparti)	3
Pensioners' Party (Pensjonistpartiet)	1
Red Electoral Alliance (Rød Valgallianse)	1
Centre Party (Senterpartiet)	4
Socialist Left Party (Sosialistisk Venstreparti)	3
Liberal Party (Venstre)	3
Total number of members:	63

Akershus fylkesting 1992–1995
Party name (in Norwegian)	Number of representatives
Labour Party (Arbeiderpartiet)	18
Progress Party (Fremskrittspartiet)	6
Conservative Party (Høyre)	21
Christian Democratic Party (Kristelig Folkeparti)	3
Red Electoral Alliance (Rød Valgallianse)	1
Centre Party (Senterpartiet)	5
Socialist Left Party (Sosialistisk Venstreparti)	7
Liberal Party (Venstre)	2
Total number of members:	63

Akershus fylkesting 1988–1991
Party name (in Norwegian)	Number of representatives
Labour Party (Arbeiderpartiet)	27
Progress Party (Fremskrittspartiet)	13
Green Party (Miljøpartiet De Grønne)	1
Conservative Party (Høyre)	27
Christian Democratic Party (Kristelig Folkeparti)	4
Red Electoral Alliance (Rød Valgallianse)	1
Centre Party (Senterpartiet)	4
Socialist Left Party (Sosialistisk Venstreparti)	4
Liberal Party (Venstre)	4
Total number of members:	85

Akershus fylkesting 1984–1987
Party name (in Norwegian)	Number of representatives
Labour Party (Arbeiderpartiet)	29
Progress Party (Fremskrittspartiet)	7
Conservative Party (Høyre)	30
Christian Democratic Party (Kristelig Folkeparti)	4
Liberal People's Party (Liberale Folkepartiet)	1
Red Electoral Alliance (Rød Valgallianse)	1
Centre Party (Senterpartiet)	4
Socialist Left Party (Sosialistisk Venstreparti)	5
Liberal Party (Venstre)	4
Total number of members:	85

Akershus fylkesting 1980–1983
Party name (in Norwegian)	Number of representatives
Labour Party (Arbeiderpartiet)	28
Progress Party (Fremskrittspartiet)	3
Conservative Party (Høyre)	34
Christian Democratic Party (Kristelig Folkeparti)	5
Liberal People's Party (Liberale Folkepartiet)	1
Centre Party (Senterpartiet)	5
Socialist Left Party (Sosialistisk Venstreparti)	4
Liberal Party (Venstre)	5
Total number of members:	85

Akershus fylkesting 1976–1979
Party name (in Norwegian)	Number of representatives
Labour Party (Arbeiderpartiet)	31
Anders Lange's Party (Anders Langes parti)	2
Conservative Party (Høyre)	28
Christian Democratic Party (Kristelig Folkeparti)	6
New People's Party (Nye Folkepartiet)	2
Centre Party (Senterpartiet)	8
Socialist Left Party (Sosialistisk Venstreparti)	5
Liberal Party (Venstre)	3
Total number of members:	85
