= Hildur Horn Øien =

Norwegian politician

Hildur Jorunn Oliva Horn Øien (born 25 March 1940) is a Norwegian politician for the Christian Democratic Party.

She was born in Narvik. She graduated from the University of Oslo with the cand.mag. degree in 1968. She then worked at the school Torstad in Asker Municipality from 1968 to 1990, then as manager for Kirkens SOS in Buskerud from 1990 to 1996. She was then elected to Akershus county council, serving as deputy county mayor of Akershus from 1995 to 2003 and county mayor from 2003 to 2007. From 2007 to 2011 she was a member of the municipal council of Asker Municipality.

She is married and has three children. She resides in Hvalstad.

Political offices
Preceded by Ragnar Kristoffersen	County mayor of Akershus; 2003–2007	Succeeded by Nils Aage Jegstad
