= Even Aleksander Hagen =

Norwegian politician (born 1988)

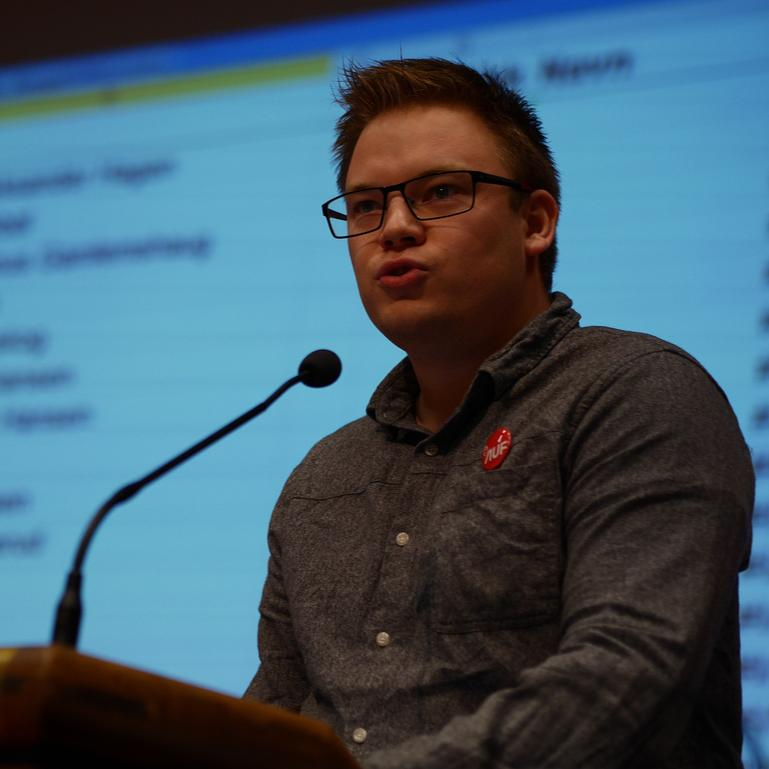

County Mayor of Innlandet
- In office October 2019 – 28 June 2023
- Preceded by: Position established
- Succeeded by: Thomas Breen

County Mayor of Oppland
- In office October 2015 – October 2019
- Preceded by: Gro Lundby
- Succeeded by: Position abolished

Personal details
- Born: 14 April 1988 (age 38) Lillehammer, Oppland, Norway
- Party: Labour

Even Aleksander Hagen (born 14 April 1988) is a Norwegian politician for the Labour Party.

Following the 2015 local elections, Hagen became the County Mayor (fylkesordfører) of Oppland. He is also the youngest County Mayor in Norway ever.

Hagen led the merger of Oppland and Hedmark into the new county, which was named Innlandet, and in 2019 he was elected the county's first county mayor. He announced in March 2022 that he wouldn't seek re-election at the 2023 local elections. In June 2023, he was appointed as a state secretary to the Ministry of Culture and Equality a few months before the next regional election.

Hagen, who hails from Otta, survived the terror attack at Utøya on 22 July 2011 on a Workers' Youth League-run summer camp. The attacks claimed a total of 77 lives. When nominated as the Labour Party's candidate for county mayor, he said that "You have nominated a gay terror victim".
