= Inge Bartnes =

Norwegian politician

Inge Bartnes (born 24 January 1970) is a Norwegian politician for the Centre Party.

He is a grandson of Inge Einarsen Bartnes, son of Erik Bartnes and brother of Lars Erik Bartnes.

He served as a deputy representative to the Parliament of Norway from Nord-Trøndelag during the term 1997–2001. During Bondevik's First Cabinet Bartnes worked as a political advisor in the Ministry of Local Government and Regional Development. When Stoltenberg's Second Cabinet assumed office following the 2005 elections, Bartnes was appointed State Secretary in the same Ministry. He resigned in September 2007. He was instead hired as director of communications in Nord-Trøndelag Elektrisitetsverk.
