= Lars Erik Bartnes =

Norwegian politician

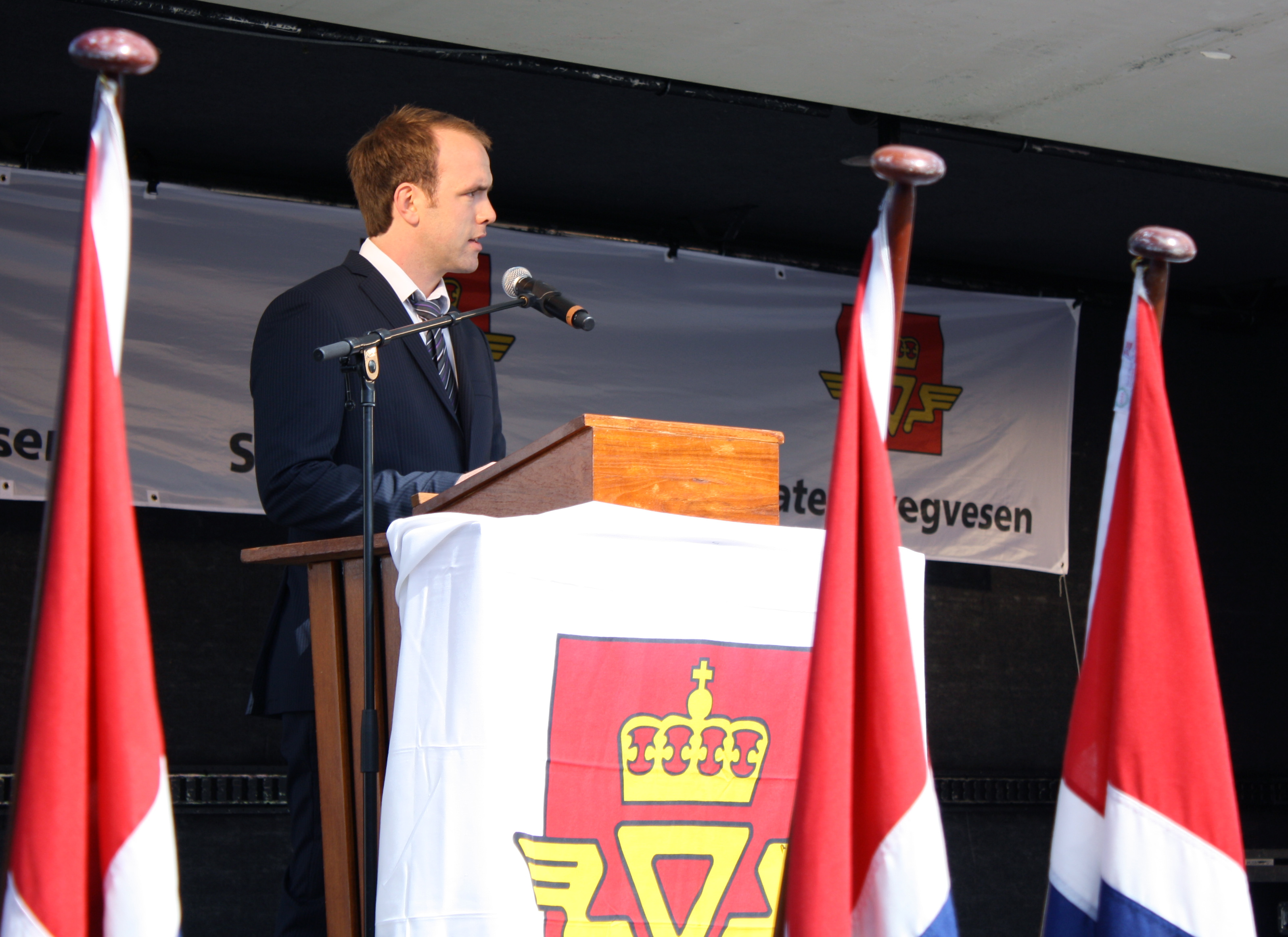
Lars Erik Bartnes, 2010.

Lars Erik Bartnes (born 14 October 1978) is a Norwegian politician for the Centre Party.

He is a grandson of Inge Einarsen Bartnes, son of Erik Bartnes and brother of Inge Bartnes. He took secondary education in Steinkjer and folk high school in Ringebu, then military service at Rena and Setermoen from 1998 to 2001, before studying political science at the Norwegian University of Science and Technology from 2001 to 2005.

He chaired the county branch of the Centre Youth before becoming a central board member from 2003 to 2004. From 2005 to 2007 he worked as a media adviser for the Centre Party parliamentary group. From September 2007 to October 2009 he was a political adviser in the Ministry of Local Government and Regional Development. He was also an acting State Secretary in the same Ministry from August to September 2009. Since October 2009 he has been a State Secretary in the Ministry of Transport and Communications.
