= Åse Marie Hagen =

Norwegian politician

Deputy county mayor of Nord-Trøndelag
- In office 2007–present

Personal details
- Born: 22 March 1973 (age 53)
- Party: Labour Party

Åse Marie Hagen (born 22 March 1973) is a Norwegian politician for the Labour Party from Steinkjer Municipality.

After the 2007 county election she was appointed deputy county mayor of Nord-Trøndelag. She had behind her a coalition of Labour, Christian, Liberal and Conservative.
