= Sunnmøre List =

Norwegian local political party focused on Sunnmøre, Møre og Romsdal

Sunnmøre List Sunnmørlisten

Sunnmøre List (Norwegian: Sunnmørslisten) is a local political party for Møre og Romsdal in Norway with focus on the Sunnmøre district. It has been represented in the county council for several periods, and in the 2007 election won three seats. In the 1985 Storting election they also ran for Storting office, but failed to get a seat, though they did get 1.1% of the popular vote.
