= 2007 Norwegian local elections =

Country-wide local elections for seats in municipality and county councils were held throughout Norway on 10 September 2007, with some areas polling on 9 September as well. For most places this meant that two elections, the municipal elections and the county elections ran concurrently. In addition, several municipalities held direct mayoral elections.

For the country at large, the election produced a major setback for the Socialist Left Party, while most other parties, including the two other parties of the governing Red-Green Coalition, the Norwegian Labour Party and the Centre Party, made some advances or held their position from 2003.

Term of office was 1 January 2008 until 31 December 2011.

== Identification requirement ==
A new rule required voters to produce an identity document in order to vote. This change was criticized by the Red Electoral Alliance who argued that poor people without such documents would be unable to afford such a document, and thus wind up disenfranchised. The minister in charge of the election, Åslaug Haga, prompted the local election authorities to exercise discretion, and aid people who need identification if necessary. It was also not necessary to have identification if the ballot recipient knew the voter and could vouch for him or her.

== Voter turnout concerns ==
Ahead of the election, it was feared that voter turnout would be lower than the 59% of the 2003 local elections, which was already low by Norwegian standards. Even so, a few days before the early voting deadline had past, about 291,200 ballots had been cast prior to the election, up from the 249,022 ballots cast in 2003.

The final result showed a turnout of 61.7% in the municipal election, and 57.5% in the county election.

== Results and response ==
=== Municipal elections ===
2,209,706 valid votes were cast for the municipal elections, a turnout of 61.7%. These are the aggregate results:

| Party | Votes | % |
|---|---|---|
| Labour Party | 655,093 | 29.65 |
| Conservative Party | 425,694 | 19.26 |
| Progress Party | 387,476 | 17.54 |
| Centre Party | 175,673 | 7.95 |
| Christian Democratic Party | 141,019 | 6.38 |
| Socialist Left Party | 137,041 | 6.20 |
| Liberal Party | 129,656 | 5.87 |
| Red Electoral Alliance | 41,340 | 1.87 |
| Pensioners' Party | 20,501 | 0.93 |
| Coastal Party | 8,982 | 0.41 |
| Environment Party The Greens | 6,963 | 0.32 |
| Sunnmøre List | 5,595 | 0.25 |
| Sámi People's Party | 1,140 | 0.05 |
| Social Democratic Party | 537 | 0.02 |
| Communist Party | 526 | 0.02 |
| Society Party | 393 | 0.02 |
| Joint, local and other lists | 72,077 | 3.26 |
| Total | 2,209,706 | 100.00 |

In the large cities, Oslo and Bergen retained a majority for the non-socialist parties. The Labour Party enjoyed significant gains in Trondheim and Tromsø. A Conservative-Labour coalition will share the power in Stavanger (continue) and Kristiansand (new).

=== County elections ===
2,076,609 valid votes were cast for the county elections, a turnout of 57.5%. These are the aggregate results:

| Party | Votes | % | Seats | +/– |
|---|---|---|---|---|
| Labour Party | 639,781 | 30.81 | 236 | +28 |
| Conservative Party | 389,437 | 18.75 | 120 | +7 |
| Progress Party | 384,982 | 18.54 | 141 | +14 |
| Centre Party | 162,660 | 7.83 | 73 | –7 |
| Christian Democratic Party | 139,584 | 6.72 | 54 | −3 |
| Socialist Left Party | 135,461 | 6.52 | 46 | −44 |
| Liberal Party | 116,316 | 5.60 | 37 | +10 |
| Red Electoral Alliance | 42,920 | 2.07 | 8 | +2 |
| Pensioners' Party | 22,649 | 1.09 | 5 | –3 |
| Environment Party The Greens | 12,379 | 0.60 | 0 | 0 |
| Coastal Party | 9,104 | 0.44 | 3 | −1 |
| Democrats | 6,352 | 0.31 | 1 | 0 |
| Sunnmøre List | 5,595 | 0.27 | 3 | 0 |
| Christian Unity Party | 2,811 | 0.14 | 0 | 0 |
| Vestfold List | 1,593 | 0.08 | 0 | –2 |
| Oslo City Action | 1,466 | 0.07 | 0 | – |
| Communist Party | 1,210 | 0.06 | 0 | 0 |
| Sámi People's Party | 1,140 | 0.05 | 1 | –1 |
| Sámi People's Party list 2 | 393 | 0.02 | 0 | – |
| Immigrant Party | 329 | 0.02 | 0 | – |
| Democratic Alternative Oslo | 191 | 0.01 | 0 | – |
| Society Party | 129 | 0.01 | 0 | 0 |
| Liberal People's Party | 127 | 0.01 | 0 | 0 |
| Total | 2,076,609 | 100.00 | 728 | 0 |

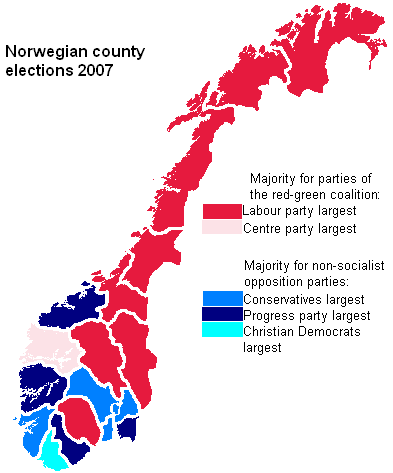
Election results by county

=== Response ===
For the country at large, the Socialist Left Party's (SV) popularity plummeted, and the result was described as a "catastrophe". Most other main line parties could log slight gains or a result comparable with the previous election.

Part of the explanation for SV's poor performance has been laid on their performance in the cabinet. In particular Helen Bjørnøy, the minister of environmental affairs, and Øystein Djupedal, the minister of education and research have faced criticism. Bjørnøy has been well respected, but has suffered due to having to make compromises on environmental issues, in particular to the Centre Party which favors rural development, often over conservation. Djupedal has had to contend with accusations of arrogance, and several teachers, who SV have traditionally fared well amongst, have complained about the lack of improvement in the country's education system. Also, SV's party leader and Norway's minister of finance, Kristin Halvorsen has been behind some unpopular economic measures. Olav Gunnar Ballo, an SV member of parliament has called for the resignation of both Bjørnøy and Djupedal, but on the day after the election, Halvorsen announced that none of the SV cabinet members would be dismissed.

== Allegations of electoral fraud in Drammen ==
In the election in Drammen Municipality, it was revealed that a number of drug addicts had been offered 50 kr (approximately 8 US Dollars) if they would vote for the Labour Party, and with a personal vote for the candidate Yousuf Gilani. There were also allegations that Gilani had escorted voters into the election booths. Another allegation was that a person who declined a bribe to vote in this manner was subjected to death threats. The police investigating the allegations indicated that electoral fraud had indeed taken place, Gilani was asked by his party to take a leave from his political duties. Gilani took a leave, and both he and the Labour Party have stated that this was a decision made on Gilani's initiative.

Gilani himself reported the case to the police, denying any wrongdoing and stating his belief that the incident was part of a smear campaign. Gilani also reported death threats and incidents of harassment directed against him during the run-up to the election.

Two members of the Drammen council, from the Progress Party and the Socialist Left Party called for the result to be cancelled, and for new elections to be held in the city. Åslaug Haga, the minister whose cabinet was in charge of the elections, also hinted that a rerun might become necessary. However, the mayor, Tore Opdal Hansen (Conservative), while expressing shock at the revelations, said that would probably not happen. It was pointed out that the scope of the fraud appeared small, and that even if all the 364 Labour ballots with a personal vote for Gilani were thrown out, that there would be no effect on the council's composition partywise. A meeting in the Drammen election board on 24 September approved the result, prompting demands for law amendments ro allow election reruns even if the party composition in the council remained unchanged. Mayor Hansen was among those expressing disappointment at the board not having the authority to reject the result, even if the personal composition of the council could be altered. Magnhild Meltveit Kleppa, the new minister of Local Government and Regional Development, and in charge of the Norwegian elections at large, promised to consider amendments to the tighten the law if needed to prevent such incidents happening again.

== Direct mayoral elections ==
Several municipalities held direct mayoral elections rather than having the council appoint the mayor. The municipalities holding these elections were (municipalities who held such elections for the first time are marked "(new)"):

- Østfold county
  - Eidsberg Municipality (new)
  - Spydeberg Municipality (new)
- Akershus county
  - Hurdal Municipality
  - Nesodden Municipality (new)
- Hedmark county
  - Alvdal Municipality
  - Trysil Municipality
- Oppland county
  - Gausdal Municipality
  - Nord-Aurdal Municipality (new)
  - Søndre Land Municipality (new)
- Buskerud county
  - Lier Municipality
  - Hemsedal Municipality (new)
- Vestfold county
  - Re Municipality
  - Holmestrand Municipality (new)
  - Nøtterøy Municipality (new)
  - Stokke Municipality (new)
  - Tønsberg Municipality (new)
- Aust-Agder county
  - Risør Municipality
  - Evje og Hornnes Municipality (new)
- Vest-Agder county
  - Farsund Municipality (new)
  - Flekkefjord Municipality (new)
  - Kvinesdal Municipality (new)
  - Songdalen Municipality (new)
- Rogaland county
  - Strand Municipality
  - Klepp Municipality
  - Vindafjord Municipality
  - Eigersund Municipality (new)
  - Time Municipality (new)
- Hordaland county
  - Fusa Municipality (new)
  - Kvam Municipality (new)
- Sogn og Fjordane county
  - Selje Municipality
  - Vågsøy Municipality (new)
- Møre og Romsdal county
  - Gjemnes Municipality
  - Molde Municipality
  - Averøy Municipality (new)
  - Sula Municipality (new)
  - Ørskog Municipality (new)
- Sør-Trøndelag county
  - Hemne Municipality
  - Osen Municipality (new)
- Nordland county
  - Evenes Municipality
  - Dønna Municipality (new)
- Troms county
  - Harstad Municipality
  - Ibestad Municipality
  - Lyngen Municipality
  - Kvæfjord Municipality
  - Skjervøy Municipality
  - Skånland Municipality
  - Målselv Municipality
  - Lenvik Municipality (new)
- Finnmark county
  - Deatnu Tana Municipality (new)

Among the notable results in these elections was Knut Henning Thygesen's victory in Risør Municipality, making him the first mayor ever for the Red Electoral Alliance.
