= Oppland County Municipality =

Oppland County Municipality Oppland fylkeskommune
- Former County
- Coat of arms

- Location in Norway
- Coordinates: 61°07′02″N 10°27′53″E
- Country: Norway
- Disestablished: 31 Dec 2019
- Administrative center: Lillehammer

Government
  - County mayor: Even Aleksander Hagen
- ISO 3166 code: NO-05
- Revenue: NOK 3,300 million
- Employees: 1,800
- Schools: 13
- Transit authority: Opplandstrafikk

Oppland County Municipality (Norwegian: Oppland fylkeskommune) was the regional governing administration of the old Oppland county in Norway. The county municipality was established in its most recent form on 1 January 1976 when the law was changed to allow elected county councils in Norway. The county municipality was dissolved on 1 January 2020, when Oppland was merged with the neighboring Hedmark county, creating the new Innlandet county which is led by the Innlandet County Municipality. The administrative seat is located in Lillehammer and the county mayor was Even Aleksander Hagen.

The main responsibilities of the county municipality included the running of the 13 upper secondary schools. It managed all the county roadways, public transport, dental care, culture, and cultural heritage sites in the county. Public transport was managed through Opplandstrafikk.

== Schools ==
The county municipality ran the following schools (prior to the merger with Hedmark in 2020):

- Dokka Upper Secondary School
- Gausdal Upper Secondary School
- Gjøvik Upper Secondary School
- Hadeland Upper Secondary School
- Lena Upper Secondary School
- Lillehammer Upper Secondary School
- Mesna Upper Secondary School
- Nord-Gudbrandsdal Upper Secondary School
- Raufoss Upper Secondary School
- Valdres Upper Secondary School
- Valle Upper Secondary School
- Vargstad Upper Secondary School
- Vinstra Upper Secondary School

== County government ==
The Oppland county council (Norwegian: Fylkestinget) was made up of 37 representatives that were elected every four years. The council essentially acted as a Parliament or legislative body for the county and it met several times each year. The council was divided into standing committees and an executive board (fylkesutvalg) which met considerably more often. Both the council and executive board were led by the County Mayor (fylkesordfører) who held the executive powers of the county. The final County Mayor was Even Aleksander Hagen.

=== County council ===
The party breakdown of the council is as follows:

Oppland fylkesting 2015–2019
Party name (in Norwegian)	Number of representatives
Labour Party (Arbeiderpartiet)	16
Progress Party (Fremskrittspartiet)	3
Green Party (Miljøpartiet De Grønne)	2
Conservative Party (Høyre)	5
Christian Democratic Party (Kristelig Folkeparti)	1
Centre Party (Senterpartiet)	7
Socialist Left Party (Sosialistisk Venstreparti)	1
Liberal Party (Venstre)	2
Total number of members:	37

Oppland fylkesting 2012–2015
Party name (in Norwegian)	Number of representatives
Labour Party (Arbeiderpartiet)	17
Progress Party (Fremskrittspartiet)	3
Conservative Party (Høyre)	7
Christian Democratic Party (Kristelig Folkeparti)	1
Centre Party (Senterpartiet)	5
Socialist Left Party (Sosialistisk Venstreparti)	2
Liberal Party (Venstre)	2
Total number of members:	37

Oppland fylkesting 2008–2011
Party name (in Norwegian)	Number of representatives
Labour Party (Arbeiderpartiet)	16
Progress Party (Fremskrittspartiet)	6
Conservative Party (Høyre)	4
Christian Democratic Party (Kristelig Folkeparti)	1
Centre Party (Senterpartiet)	6
Socialist Left Party (Sosialistisk Venstreparti)	2
Liberal Party (Venstre)	2
Total number of members:	37

Oppland fylkesting 2004–2007
Party name (in Norwegian)	Number of representatives
Labour Party (Arbeiderpartiet)	15
Progress Party (Fremskrittspartiet)	5
Conservative Party (Høyre)	4
Christian Democratic Party (Kristelig Folkeparti)	2
Centre Party (Senterpartiet)	6
Socialist Left Party (Sosialistisk Venstreparti)	4
Liberal Party (Venstre)	1
Total number of members:	37

Oppland fylkesting 2000–2003
Party name (in Norwegian)	Number of representatives
Labour Party (Arbeiderpartiet)	19
Progress Party (Fremskrittspartiet)	4
Conservative Party (Høyre)	6
Christian Democratic Party (Kristelig Folkeparti)	4
Centre Party (Senterpartiet)	7
Socialist Left Party (Sosialistisk Venstreparti)	3
Liberal Party (Venstre)	2
Total number of members:	45

Oppland fylkesting 1996–1999
Party name (in Norwegian)	Number of representatives
Labour Party (Arbeiderpartiet)	20
Progress Party (Fremskrittspartiet)	3
Conservative Party (Høyre)	5
Christian Democratic Party (Kristelig Folkeparti)	3
Centre Party (Senterpartiet)	10
Socialist Left Party (Sosialistisk Venstreparti)	3
Liberal Party (Venstre)	1
Total number of members:	45

Oppland fylkesting 1992–1995
Party name (in Norwegian)	Number of representatives
Labour Party (Arbeiderpartiet)	24
Progress Party (Fremskrittspartiet)	2
Conservative Party (Høyre)	7
Christian Democratic Party (Kristelig Folkeparti)	3
Centre Party (Senterpartiet)	12
Socialist Left Party (Sosialistisk Venstreparti)	6
Liberal Party (Venstre)	1
Total number of members:	55

Oppland fylkesting 1988–1991
Party name (in Norwegian)	Number of representatives
Labour Party (Arbeiderpartiet)	28
Progress Party (Fremskrittspartiet)	5
Conservative Party (Høyre)	7
Christian Democratic Party (Kristelig Folkeparti)	3
Centre Party (Senterpartiet)	8
Socialist Left Party (Sosialistisk Venstreparti)	2
Liberal Party (Venstre)	2
Total number of members:	55

Oppland fylkesting 1984–1987
Party name (in Norwegian)	Number of representatives
Labour Party (Arbeiderpartiet)	30
Progress Party (Fremskrittspartiet)	2
Conservative Party (Høyre)	8
Christian Democratic Party (Kristelig Folkeparti)	3
Centre Party (Senterpartiet)	8
Socialist Left Party (Sosialistisk Venstreparti)	2
Liberal Party (Venstre)	2
Total number of members:	55

Oppland fylkesting 1980–1983
Party name (in Norwegian)	Number of representatives
Labour Party (Arbeiderpartiet)	28
Progress Party (Fremskrittspartiet)	1
Conservative Party (Høyre)	9
Christian Democratic Party (Kristelig Folkeparti)	4
Centre Party (Senterpartiet)	9
Socialist Left Party (Sosialistisk Venstreparti)	2
Liberal Party (Venstre)	2
Total number of members:	55

Oppland fylkesting 1976–1979
Party name (in Norwegian)	Number of representatives
Labour Party (Arbeiderpartiet)	30
Conservative Party (Høyre)	5
Christian Democratic Party (Kristelig Folkeparti)	5
Centre Party (Senterpartiet)	11
Socialist Left Party (Sosialistisk Venstreparti)	3
Liberal Party (Venstre)	1
Total number of members:	55
