= 2018 in Norway =

- Centuries: 19th; 20th; 21st
- Decades: 1990s; 2000s; 2010s; 2020s
- See also: List of years in Norway

Events in the year 2018 in Norway.

== Incumbents ==
- Monarch – Harald V.
- Prime Minister – Erna Solberg (Conservative).

== Events ==
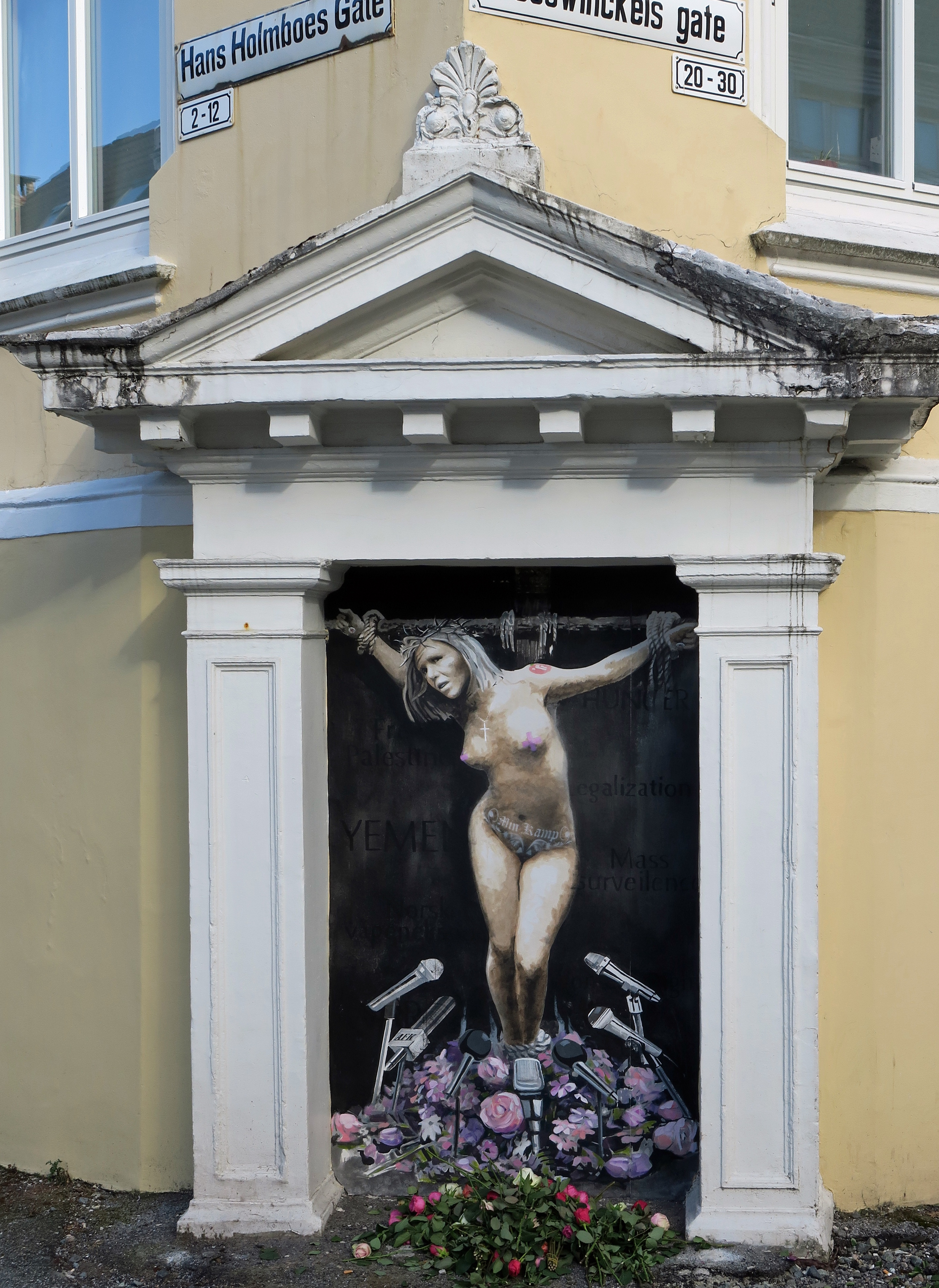
Making a martyr – distraction by polarization (revealed Easter 2018), street art by AFK, visualizing the political drama leading to resignation of Minister of Justice Sylvi Listhaug.

- 1 January – municipal and county reform took effect:

- Færder Municipality was established by the unification of Tjøme Municipality and Nøtterøy Municipality.
- Lardal Municipality was incorporated into Larvik Municipality.
- Hof Municipality was incorporated into Holmestrand Municipality.
- Indre Fosen Municipality was established by the unification of Rissa Municipality and Leksvik Municipality.
- Trøndelag county was established by the unification of the former counties of Sør-Trøndelag and Nord-Trøndelag.

- 12 January – Following the MeToo movement, Dag Rønning announced his resignation as Chairman of Hedmark County Council, effective 15 January.
- 15 February – Ida Børresen resigned as managing director of the Parliament of Norway.
- 9 March – Olemic Thommessen announced his resignation as President of the Parliament of Norway, effective 15 March.
- 15 March – Tone Wilhelmsen Trøen was sworn in as the new President of the Parliament of Norway.
- 20 March – Sylvi Listhaug resigned as Minister of Justice, pending a vote of no confidence due later the same day.
- June – The parliament voted to ban the burqa in schools and universities.
- 17 December – Students Louisa Vesterager Jespersen and Maren Ueland are murdered by Islamic terrorists in the foothills of Mount Toubkal, Morocco. At least one victim is beheaded with the murders recorded on video and posted on social media.

== Popular culture ==
=== Sports ===
- 28 January – Norway ranked 7th at the 2018 European Men's Handball Championship.
- 9 to 25 February – Norway participated at the 2018 Winter Olympics in PyeongChang, South Korea, with 109 competitors in 11 sports. By winning a total of 39 medals (14 gold, 14 silver and 11 bronze), the country set a new record for the most medals won at a single Winter Olympics.
- 9 to 18 March – Norway participated at the 2018 Winter Paralympics in PyeongChang, South Korea
- 11 March – Sverre Lunde Pedersen was set to win the 2018 World Allround Speed Skating Championships, but ultimately won the silver medal.
- 14 March – Joar Leifseth Ulsom wins the Iditarod Trail Sled Dog Race in Alaska.
- 7 April – Marit Bjørgen raced for the last time in cross-country skiing, finishing with a silver medal at the national championships.
- 6 to 12 August – Norway at the 2018 European Athletics Championships
- 12 December – Petter Northug announced his retirement from active cross-country skiing.
- 14 December – Norway ranked 5th at the 2018 European Women's Handball Championship.

== Anniversaries ==
- 14 January – 200 years since the birth of Ole Jacob Broch.
- 21 January – 150 years since the establishment of the Norwegian Trekking Association.
- 30 January – 100 years since the birth of André Bjerke. Posten Norge marked the anniversary by issuing a stamp featuring Bjerke. The stamp, with a value of 21 NOK, is part of a series of two stamps, the other featuring Hans Børli.
- 25 March – 200 years since the death of mathematician and cartographer Caspar Wessel.
- 6 April – 200 years since the birth of poet, journalist and language pioneer Aasmund Olavsson Vinje.
- 29 August – 50 years since the marriage between Harald V of Norway and Sonja Haraldsen.
- 9 October – 50 years since the first commercial discovery of petroleum deposit on the Norwegian continental shelf
- 23 October – 150 years since the birth of Katti Anker Møller, feminist, children's rights advocate, and a pioneer of reproductive rights.
- 8 December – 100 years since the birth of Hans Børli. Posten Norge marked the anniversary by issuing a stamp featuring Børli. The stamp, with a value of 38 NOK, is part of a series of two stamps, the other featuring André Bjerke.

== Deaths ==
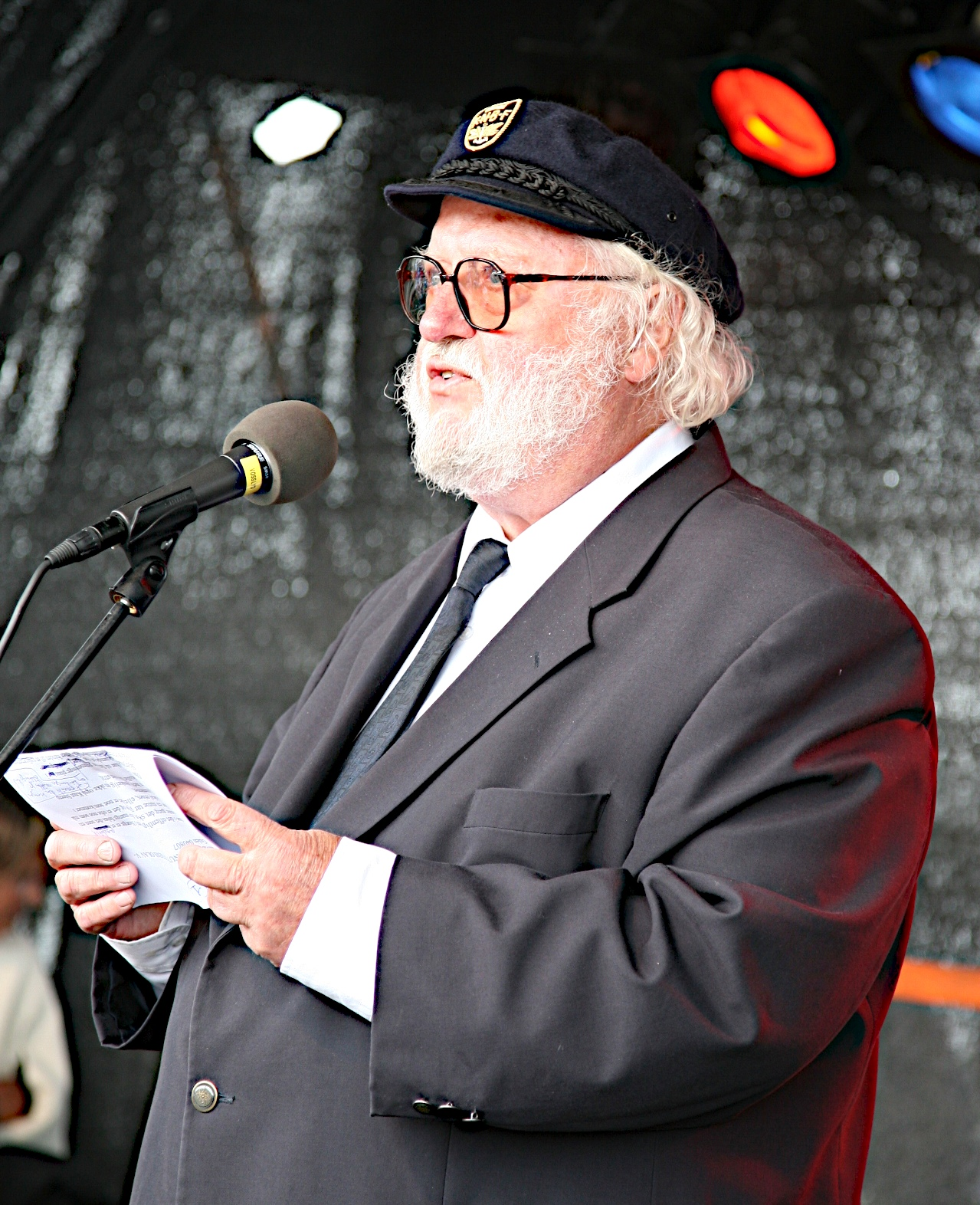
Jahn Otto Johansen

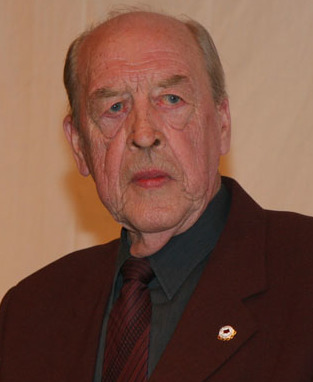
Odvar Nordli, prime minister 1976–1981

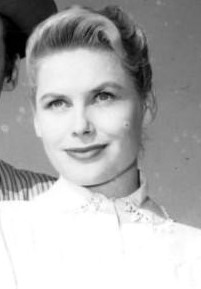
Anna-Lisa in the television western series Black Saddle in 1959

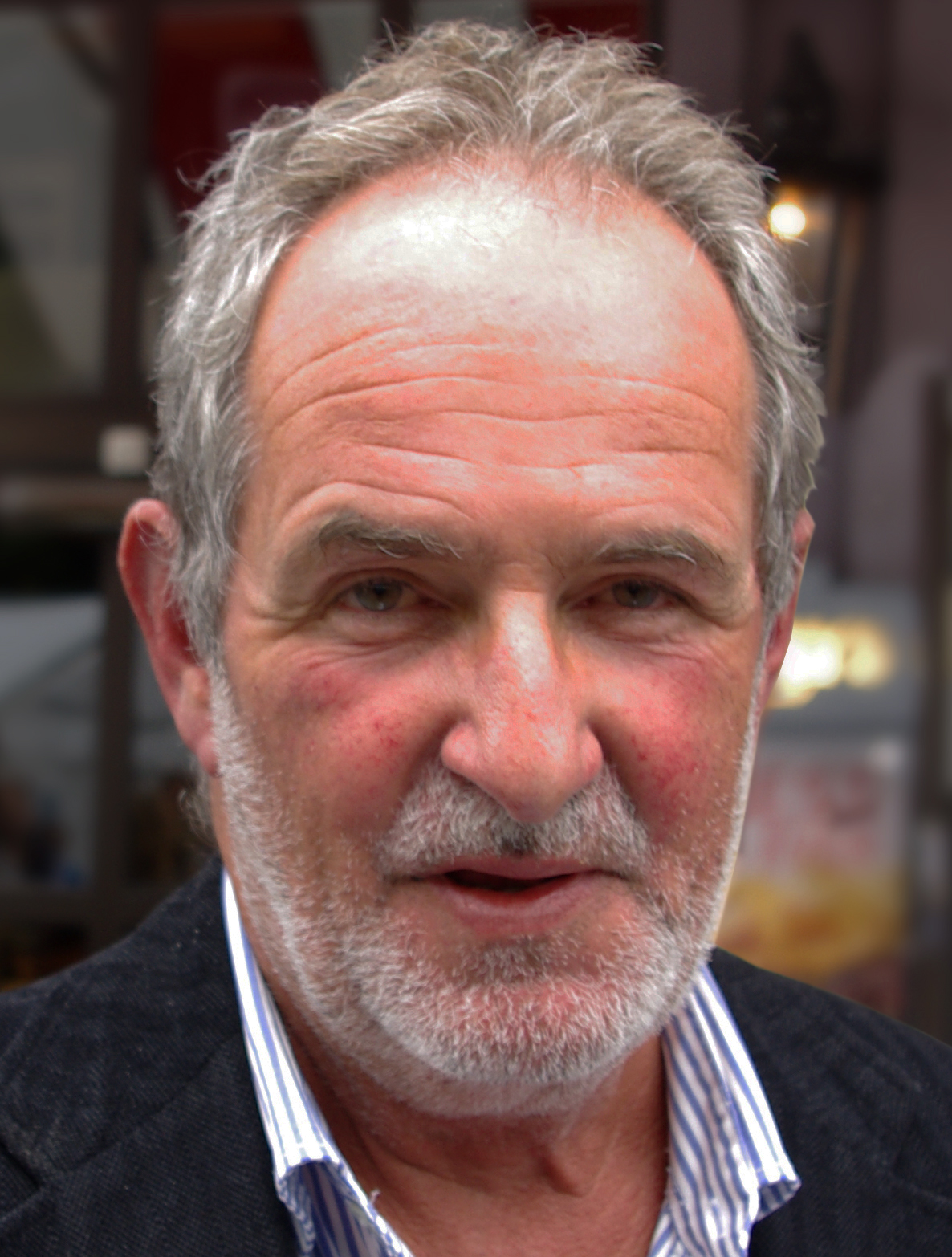
Jon Michelet in 2011

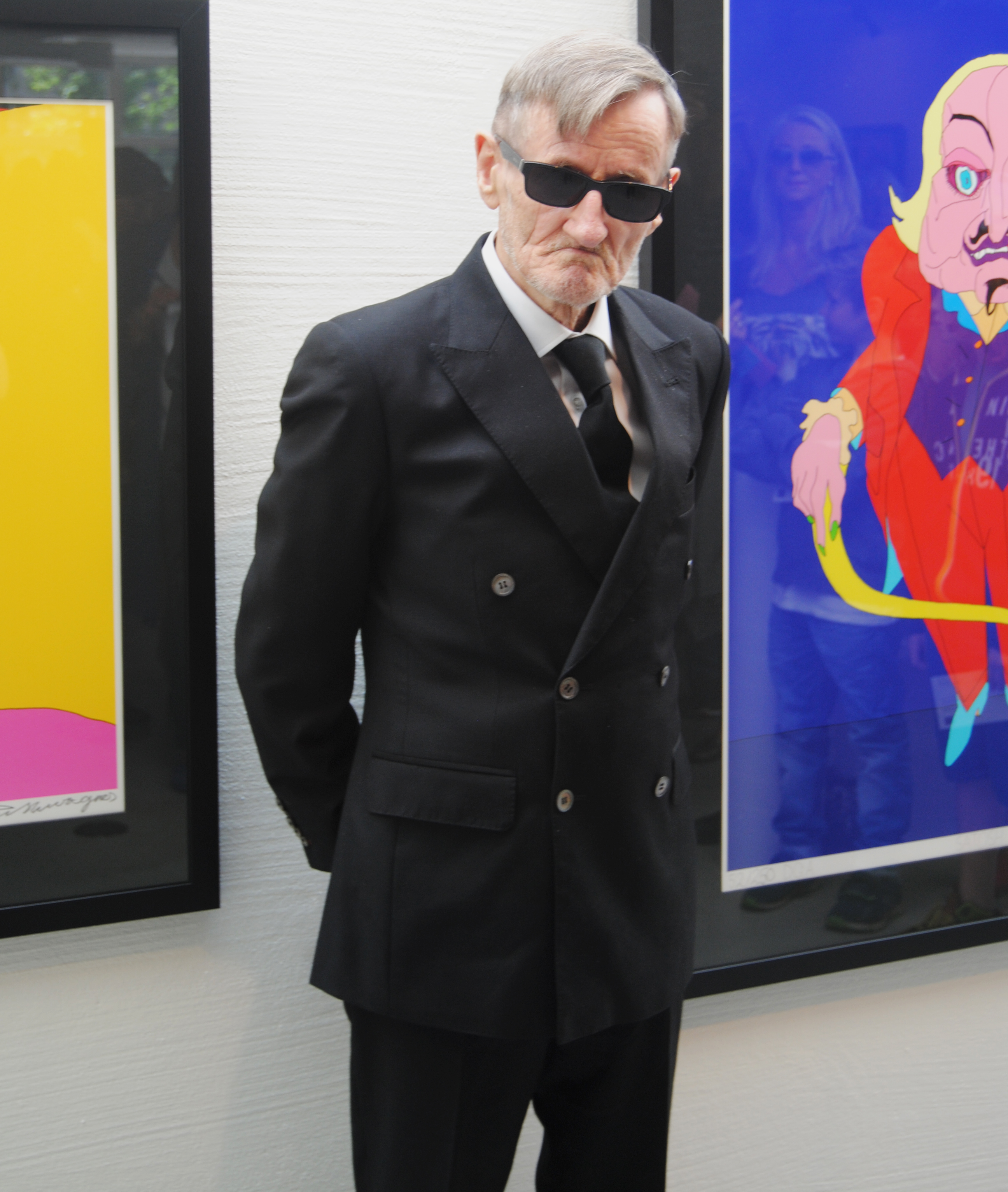
Pushwagner in 2014

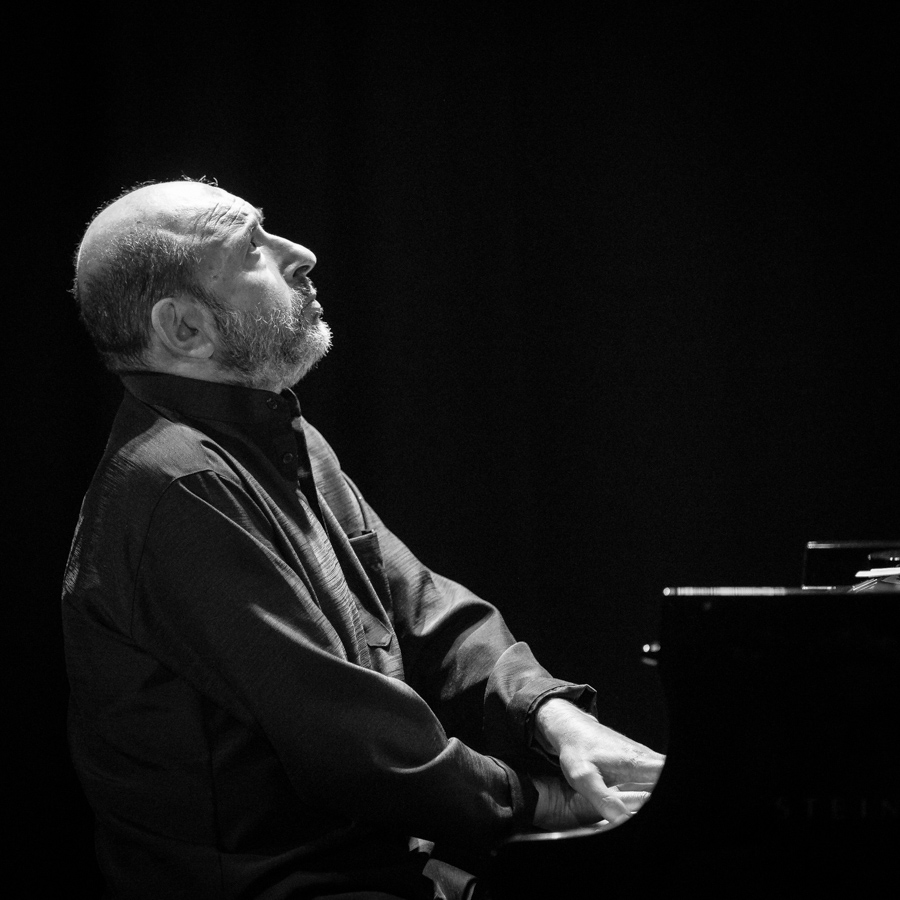
Mikhail Alperin performing in 2017

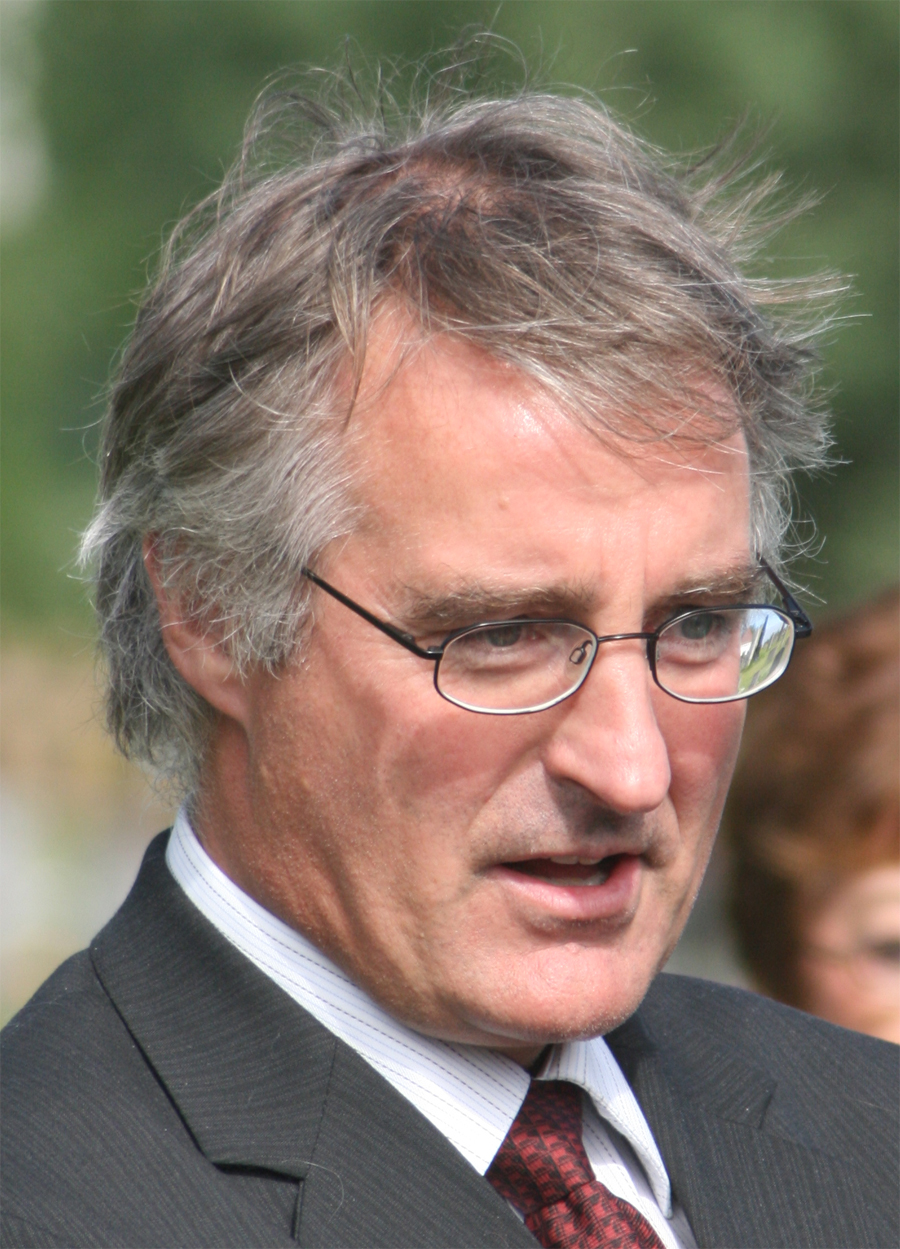
Jan Henry T. Olsen was Minister of Fisheries from 1992 to 1996

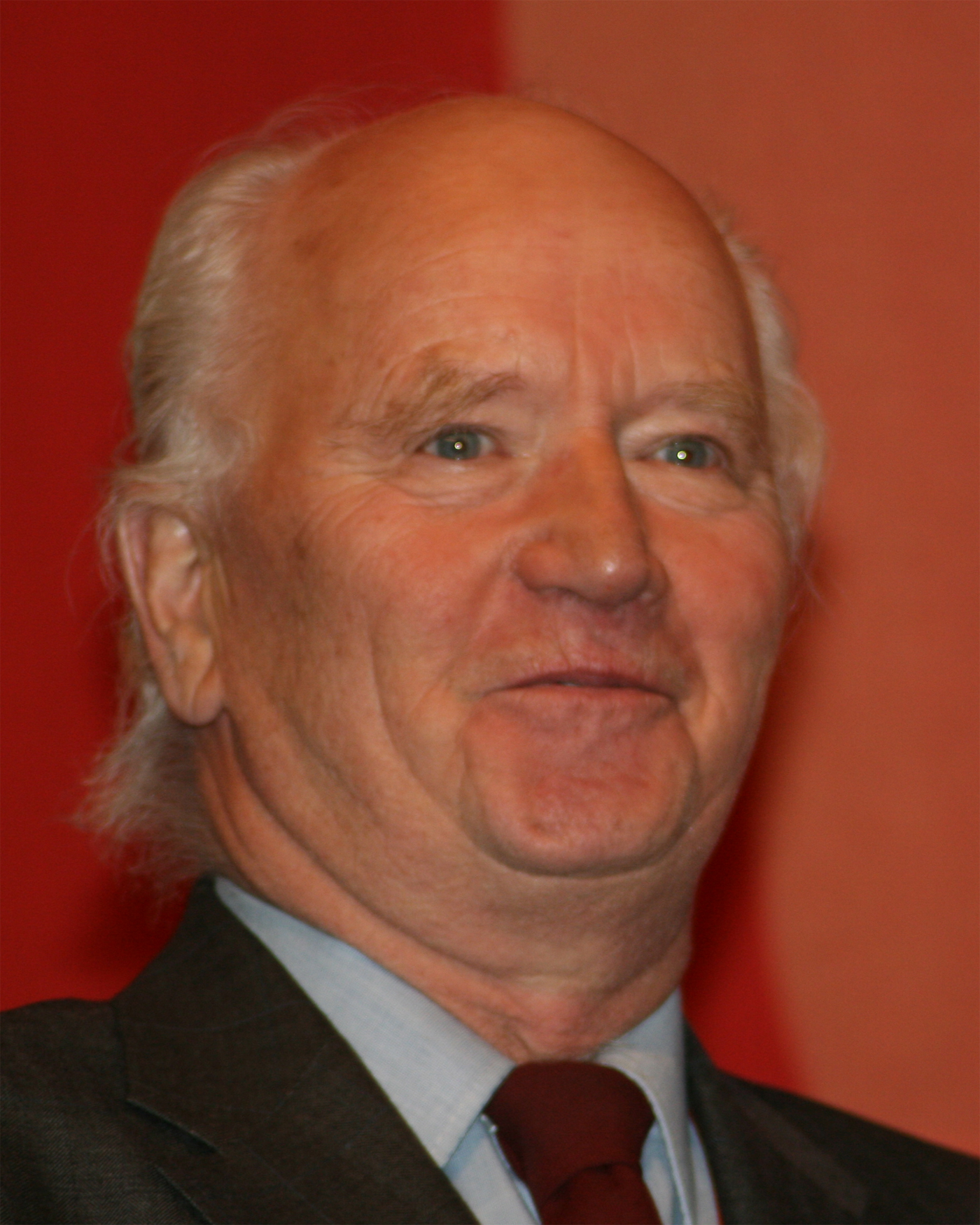
Thorvald Stoltenberg in 2009

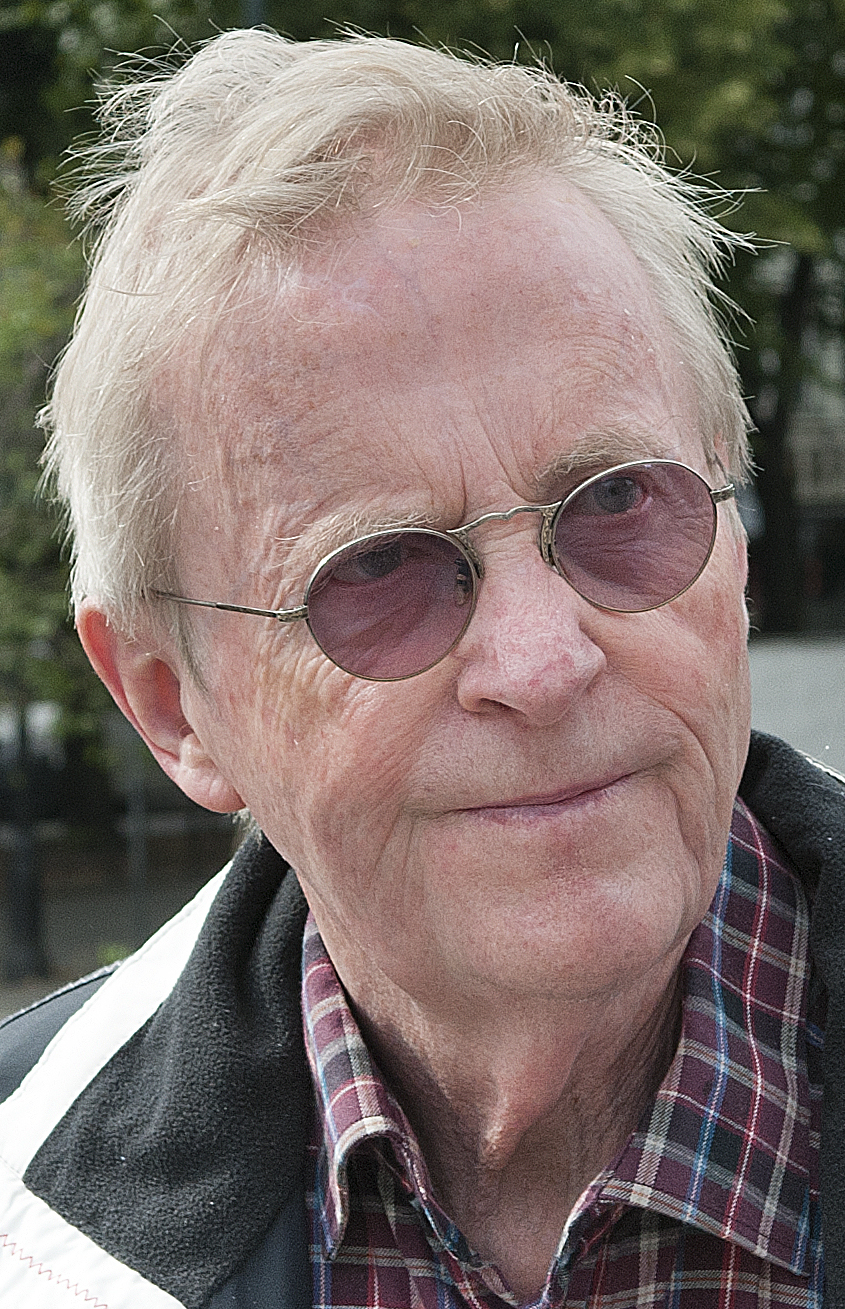
Tor Erling Staff in 2013

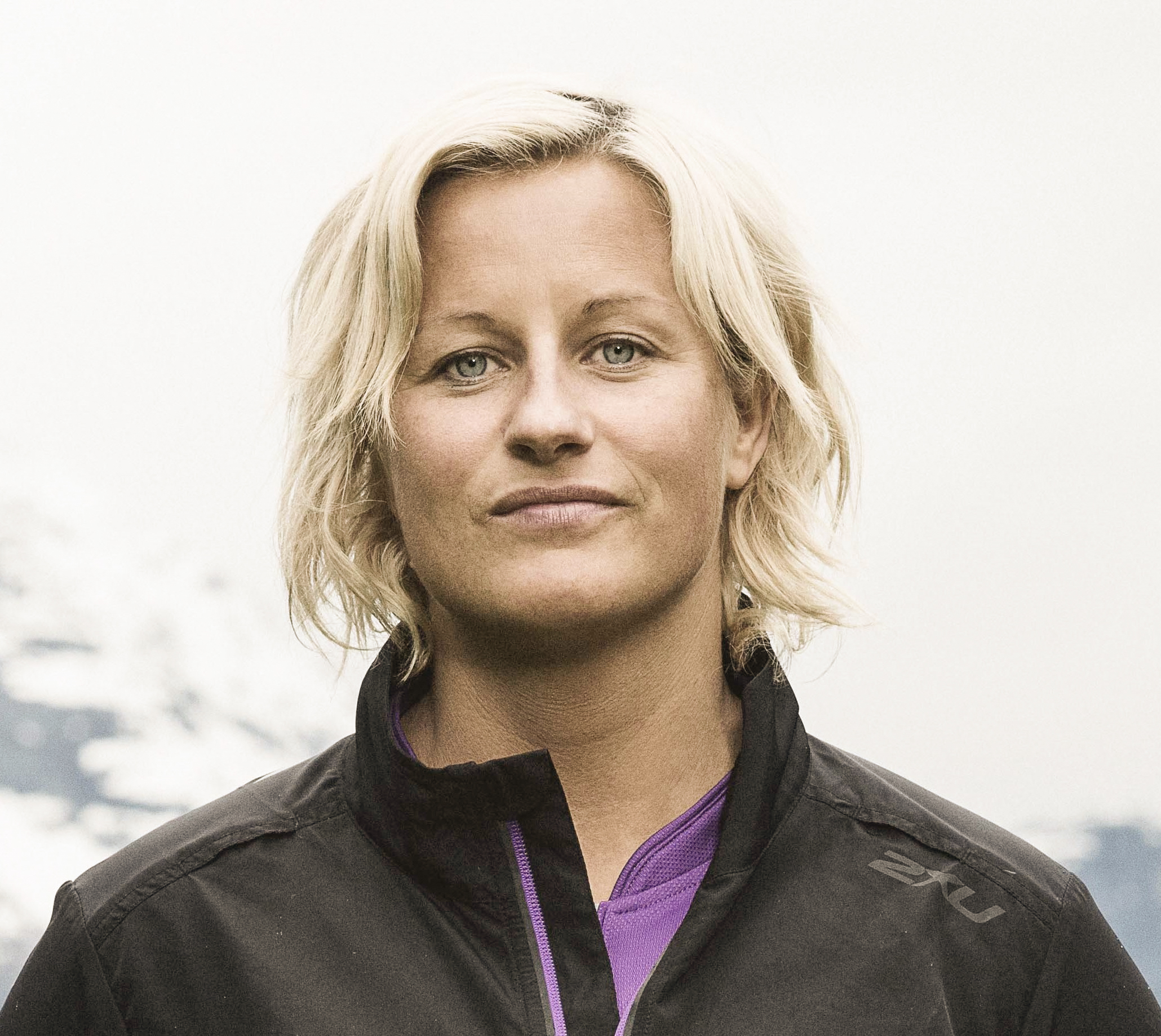
Vibeke Skofterud in 2015

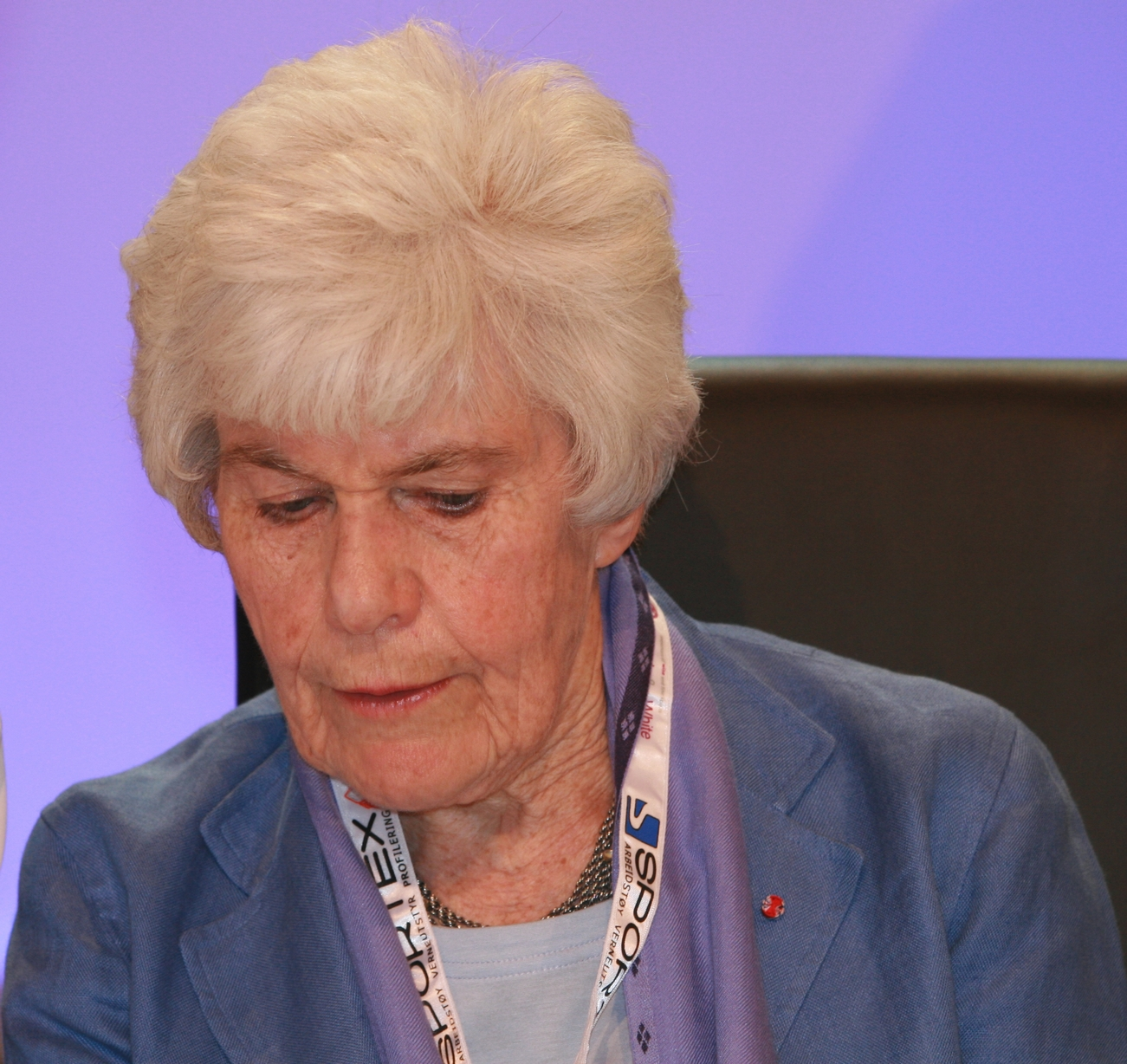
Ingrid Espelid Hovig in 2008

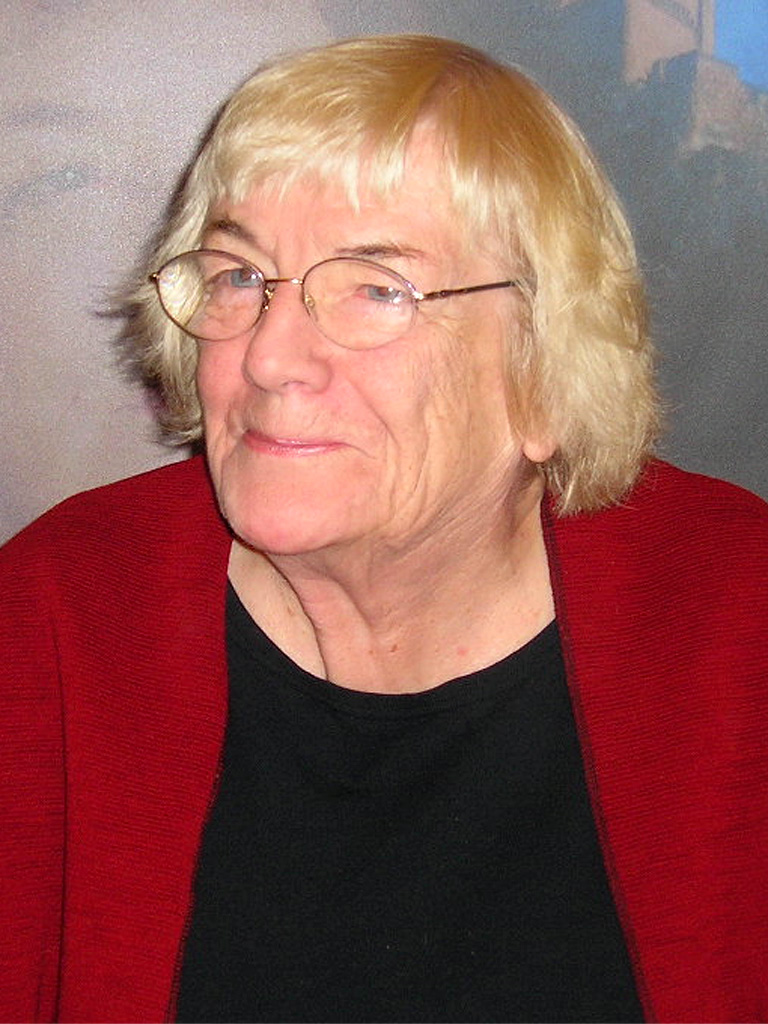
Margit Sandemo in 2005

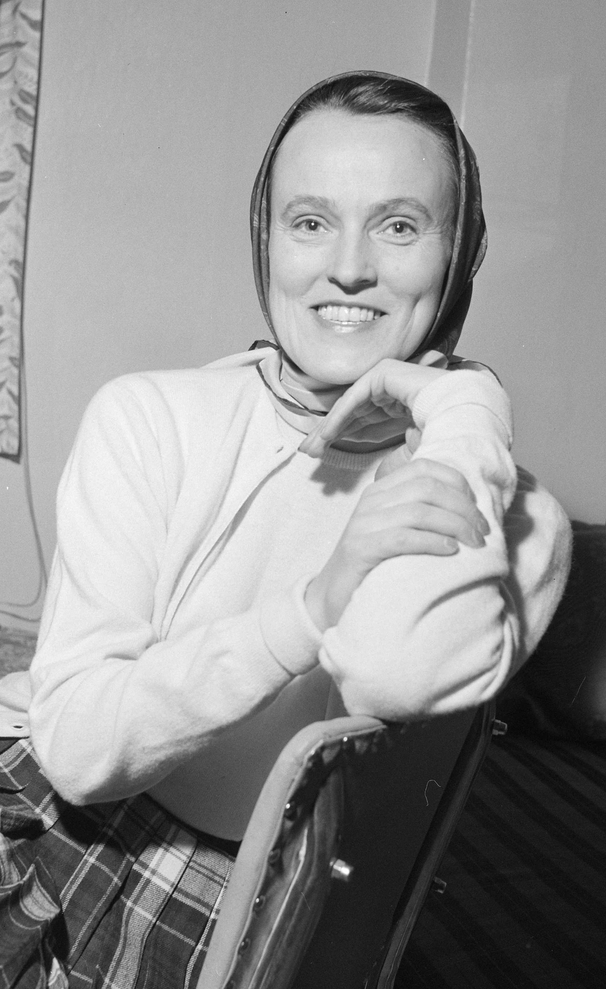
Merete Skavlan

- 1 January – Jahn Otto Johansen, journalist and writer (b. 1934).
- 7 January – Gustav Heiberg Simonsen, lawyer and politician (b. 1935).
- 7 January – Bjørg Vik, writer, co-founder of Sirene (b. 1935).
- 9 January – Odvar Nordli, Prime Minister (b. 1927).
- 10 January – Gordon Hølmebakk, writer and publisher (b. 1928).
- 11 January – Jan Valentin Sæther, painter (b. 1944).
- 15 January – Terje Skarsfjord, footballer (b. 1942).
- 16 January – Pål Spilling, physicist and Internet pioneer (b. 1934).
- 16 January – Jørgen Dobloug, artist (b. 1945).
- 18 January – Tine Valand, musician (born 1963).
- 29 January – Asmund Bjørken, jazz musician (b. 1933).
- 30 January – Elisabeth Sveri, military officer (b. 1927).
- 30 January – Bjørn Boysen, organist (b. 1943).
- 4 February – Leif Rygg, folk musician (b. 1940).
- 5 February – Ove Stokstad, jazz musician (b. 1939).
- 7 February – Skule Waksvik, sculptor (b. 1927).
- 7 February – Daniel Heradstveit, political scientist (b. 1940).
- 13 February – Geir Magnus Nyborg, theologian (b. 1951).
- 13 February - Inni Karine Melbye, animator (b. 1937, died in Denmark).
- 14 February – Gunnar Kjøde, missionary leader (b. 1922).
- 15 February – Ivar Belck-Olsen, politician (b. 1932).
- 16 February – Reidar Berg, bobsledder (b. 1924).
- 16 February – Lee Chul-ho, chef (b. 1937).
- 16 February – Tor Brevik, composer (b. 1932).
- 17 February – Martin Buvik, politician (b. 1923).
- 25 February – Ragnvald Dahl, civil servant and politician (b. 1938).
- 25 February – Ola Thorleif Ruud, politician and civil servant (b. 1926).
- 28 February – Gjert Wilhelmsen, ship-owner (b. 1927).
- 1 March – Fredrik Bull-Hansen, Chief of Defence (b. 1927).
- 4 March – Johan Trondsen, politician (b. 1922).
- 7 March – Kjell Venås, philologist (b. 1927).
- 8 March – Gerd Søraa, editor and politician (b. 1934).
- 16 March – Adrian Lillebekk Ovlien, footballer (b. 1997)
- 18 March – Håkon Banken, singer (b. 1949)
- 18 March – Torstein Harbo, educationalist (b. 1927).
- 21 March – Anna-Lisa Ruud, actress (b. 1933).
- 23 March – Kari Bay Haugen, radio and television presenter (b. 1937).
- 25 March – Dagfinn Vårvik, politician and editor (b. 1924).
- 31 March – Frode Viken, guitarist and songwriter (b. 1955).
- 31 March – Helge Nordahl, philologist (b. 1927).
- 31 March – Ingri Lande, politician (b. 1918).
- 31 March – Ivar Sandvik, civil servant (b. 1923).
- 31 March – Sven Wibye Meinich, architect (b. 1934).
- 2 April – Olaf I. Rønning, botanist (b. 1924).
- 6 April – Thorstein Rittun, painter (b. 1929).
- 6 April – Tore Thonstad, economist (b. 1930).
- 8 April – Helge Røed, painter (b. 1938).
- 12 April – Arne Nyland, sports official (b. 1924).
- 14 April – Jon Michelet, writer, editor and politician (b. 1944).
- 19 April – Arnold Eidslott, poet (b. 1926).
- 24 April – Pushwagner, visual artist (b. 1940).
- 25 April – Bjørn Hansen, football manager (b. 1939).
- 2 May – Finn Tøraasen, footballer (b. 1936).
- 7 May – Tore Torell, magician (b. 1941).
- 8 May – Frøystein Wedervang, economist (b. 1918).
- 10 May – The Wanderer, serial burglar (b. 1958).
- 11 May – Mikhail Alperin, jazz pianist and professor (b. 1956).
- 12 May – Torstein Hansen, handballer (b. 1943).
- 12 May – Jofrid Wiik, politician (b. 1934).
- 20 May – Rolf Sand, actor (b. 1920).
- 23 May – Kai Ekanger, politician (b. 1929).
- 27 May – Harald Bjarne Slettebø, politician (b. 1922).
- 27 May – Odd Oppedal, footballer (b. 1936).
- 5 June – Ingvald Wahl, war sailor (b. 1919).
- 7 June – Minken Fosheim, actress (b. 1956).
- 10 June – Nils Terje Dalseide, civil servant (b. 1952).
- 10 June – Erling Storrusten, business executive (b. 1923).
- 12 June – Torstein "Brim" Hilt, book publisher (b. 1955).
- 14 June – Gunnar Vada, politician (b. 1927).
- 14 June – Knut Aastveit, geneticist (b. 1921).
- 15 June – Arne Martin Klausen, social anthropologist (b. 1927).
- 20 June – Solveig Laila Thoresen, politician (b. 1931).
- 24 June – Jens Kristian Thune, barrister (b. 1935).
- 24 June - Jan Elgarøy, organist (b. 1930).
- 27 June – Egil Olsen, footballer (b. 1948).
- 30 June – Johan J. Jakobsen, politician (b. 1937).
- Bjørn Lie-Hansen, opera singer (b. 1937).
- 3 July – Reidar Nielsen, politician (b. 1938).
- 10 July – Jan Henry T. Olsen, politician (b. 1956).
- 13 July – Thorvald Stoltenberg, politician and diplomat (b. 1931).
- 15 July – Ronny Fredrik Ansnes, cross-country skier (b. 1989).
- 15 July – Olav Bucher-Johannessen, diplomat (b. 1928).
- 19 July – Philip Holst-Cappelen, convicted fraudster (b. 1965).
- 22 July – Tor Erling Staff, barrister (b. 1933).
- 25 July – Roald Stensby, rock singer (b. 1940).
- 26 July – Berit Nøkleby, historian (b. 1939).
- 29 July – Vibeke Skofterud, cross-country skier (b. 1980).
- 29 July – Hans Kristian Amundsen, editor and politician (b. 1959).
- 30 July – Finn Tveter, rower (b. 1947).
- 31 July – Walid al-Kubaisi, writer (b. 1958).
- 31 July – Christopher Stensaker, lawyer and politician (b. 1935).
- 3 August – Ingrid Espelid Hovig, television chef (b. 1924).
- 7 August – Oddvar Tegnander, missionary (b. 1931).
- 7 August – Bjørn A. Larsen, designer (b. 1926).
- 8 August – Marianne Havdal, children's writer (b. 1950).
- 12 August – Norvald Yri, missionary (b. 1941).
- 12 August – Willy Rasmussen, javelin thrower (b. 1937).
- 23 August – Cindy Haug, writer (b. 1956).
- 25 August – Rolf Yngvar Berg, botanist (b. 1925).
- 26 August – Jan O. Henriksen, illustrator (b. 1945).
- 27 August – Olga Meyer, radio host (b. 1930).
- 1 September – Margit Sandemo, historical fantasy writer (b. 1924).
- 2 September – John Anton Risan, painter (b. 1934).
- 2 September – Dalia Raudonikytė With, (b. 1970).
- 8 September – Reidar Goa, footballer (b. 1942).
- 12 September – Jorunn Ringstad, politician (b. 1943).
- 17 September – Solveig Haugland, politician (b. 1932).
- 18 September – Titti Maartmann, luger (b. 1920).
- 23 September – Olav Angell, writer (b. 1932).
- 23 September – Øivind Johannessen, comedian (b. 1950).
- 24 September – Ivar Martinsen, speed skater (b. 1920).
- 24 September – Ronald Bye, politician (b. 1937).
- 25 September – Stein Bendixen, banker (b. 1938).
- 26 September – Rolf Arly Lund, actor (b. 1944).
- 27 September – Per Kørner, anti-abortion activist (b. 1936).
- 28 September – Suzanne Stiver Lie, women's rights activist (b. 1934).
- 29 September – Mille-Marie Treschow, landowner (b. 1954).
- 2 October – Ole E. Storlien, politician (b. 1935).
- 4 October – Arne Malmedal, artist (born 1937).
- 5 October – Ivar Odnes, politician (b. 1963).
- 5 October – Hege Skjeie, political scientist (b. 1955).
- 12 October – Jan Jakob Tønseth, writer (b. 1947).
- 14 October – Per Theodor Haugen, actor (b. 1932).
- 16 October – Even Hovdhaugen, linguist (b. 1941).
- 19 October – Åge Hovengen, politician (b. 1927).
- 21 October – Joachim Rønneberg, resistance fighter (b. 1919).
- 23 October – Ørnulf Boye Hansen, violinist (b. 1933).
- 24 October – Knut Langfeldt, political scientist (b. 1925).
- 28 October – Vera Micaelsen, television presenter (b. 1974).
- 30 October – Sonja Ackermann-Olsen, speed skater (b. 1934).
- 2 November – Merete Skavlan, actress (b. 1920).
- 3 November – Arild Jensen, trombonist (b. 1926).
- 6 November – Kristian Halse, politician (b. 1926).
- 12 November – Anfinn Øien, organist (b. 1922).
- 15 November – Sigmund Steinnes, politician (b. 1959).
- 19 November – Per S. Enger, zoologist (b. 1929).
- 20 November – Ronald, musician (b. 1937).
- 21 November – Jan-Lauritz Opstad, museum director (b. 1950).
- 23 November – Ivar Bjørgen, psychologist (b. 1934).
- 22 November – Håkon Hope, chemist (b. 1930).
- 25 November – Aina Thiis Leirdal, ceramist (b. 1924).
- 3 December – Arne Bøyum, physician (b. 1928).
- 3 December – Elsa Marie Quale, dancer (b. 1938).
- December – Thor Hansen, poker player (b. 1947).
- 5 December – Inge Johansen, engineer and rector (b. 1928).
- 9 December – Tor Fretheim, author (b. 1946).
- 12 December – Knud Jørgensen, Christian leader (b. 1942).
- 15 December – Harald Stabell, barrister (b. 1947).
- 16 December – Karsten Johannessen, football manager (b. 1925).
- 20 December – Klaus Hagerup, author (b. 1946).
- 31 December – Nils Utsi, actor (b. 1943).
- 31 December – Christian Mohn, ski jumper (b. 1926).
