= 1935 in Norway =

- Centuries: 18th; 19th; 20th; 21st
- Decades: 1910s; 1920s; 1930s; 1940s; 1950s
- See also: List of years in Norway

Events in the year 1935 in Norway.

== Incumbents ==
- Monarch – Haakon VII.
- Prime Minister – Johan Ludwig Mowinckel (Liberal Party) until 20 March, Johan Nygaardsvold (Labour Party)

== Popular culture ==
=== Film ===
- Du har lovet mig en kone!, starring Einar Sissener, directed by Tancred Ibsen

=== Literature ===
- Nordahl Grieg – Vår ære og vår makt

== Births ==
=== January to March ===
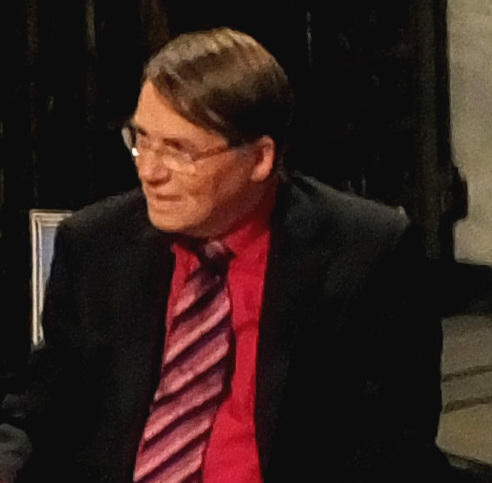
Gunnar Stålsett
- 5 January – Jan Paulsen, President of the General Conference of Seventh-day Adventists
- 7 January – Olav Holt, physicist (died 2021).
- 11 January – Reidar Webster, civil servant (died 2022).
- 13 January – Svein Aasmundstad, civil servant (died 2012)
- 22 January – Gunnar Høst Sjøwall, tennis player and photographer (died 2013)
- 26 January – Tore Bernitz Pedersen, illustrator and comics artist (died 2015).
- 6 February – Peter Angelsen, politician and Minister
- 9 February – Odd Kvaal Pedersen, journalist, author and translator (died 1990)
- 10 February – Gunnar Stålsett, bishop and politician
- 6 March – Helge Tverberg, mathematician (died 2020)
- 11 March – Karin Holter, philologist.
- 13 March – Per Bronken, actor and writer (died 2002).
- 20 March – Arne Kotte, footballer (died 2015)
- 28 March – Paula Nordhus, politician (died 1994)

=== April to June ===
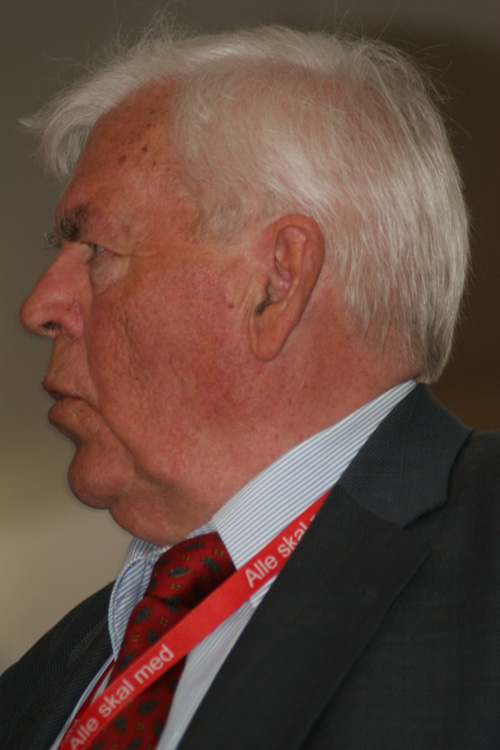
Thorbjørn Berntsen (2007)

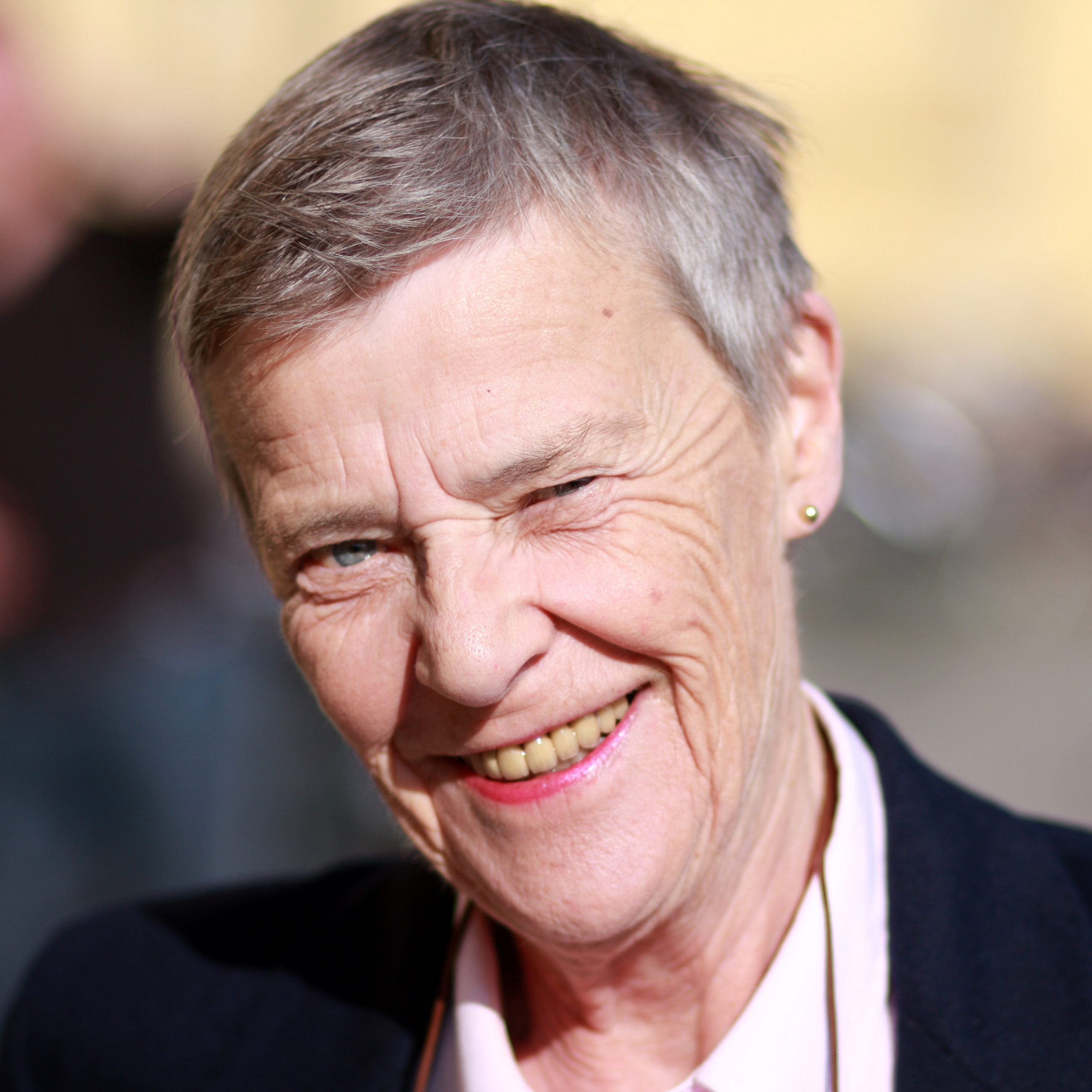
Kim Friele

- 6 April – Harald Tusberg, television personality (died 2023).
- 8 April – Tore Austad, politician and Minister (died 2025).
- 13 April – Thorbjørn Berntsen, politician and Minister
- 15 April – Jens Erik Fenstad, mathematician (died 2020)
- 20 April – Oddbjørn Sverre Langlo, politician (died 2004)
- 1 May – Arve Berg, politician
- 15 May – Hans Petter Lundgaard, jurist
- 15 May – Odd Sefland, politician (died 2004)
- 16 May – Stein Mehren, poet, novelist, essayist and playwright (died 2017).
- 27 May – Karen-Christine Friele, gay rights activist (died 2021).
- 31 May – Liv Thorsen, actress (died 2021)
- 1 June – Jacqueline Naze Tjøtta, mathematician (died 2017).
- 14 June – Kirsten Sødal, author (died 2022)
- 19 June – Arne Haugestad, Supreme Court lawyer (died 2008).

=== July to September ===
- 8 July – Roar Johansen, international soccer player (died 2015)
- 30 July – Jens Kristian Thune, barrister (died 2018).
- 9 August – Leif Ryvarden, mycologist
- 4 September – Frid Ingulstad, novelist (died 2026)
- 11 September – Bjørg Vik, writer, playwright and journalist (died 2018).
- 17 September – Einar Østby, cross country skier and Olympic silver medallist (died 2022)
- 28 September – Lars Storhaug, politician

=== October to December ===
- 8 October – Thorvald Mellingen, engineer (died 2016)
- 15 November – Stein Ørnhøi, politician
- 25 November – Kåre Harila, politician
- 11 December – Per Hovdenakk, art historian (died 2016).
- 17 December – Nils Olav Totland, politician and Minister
- 29 December – Kåre Venn, forest pathologist (died 2024).
- 30 December – Sjur Refsdal, astrophysicist (died 2009)

== Deaths ==
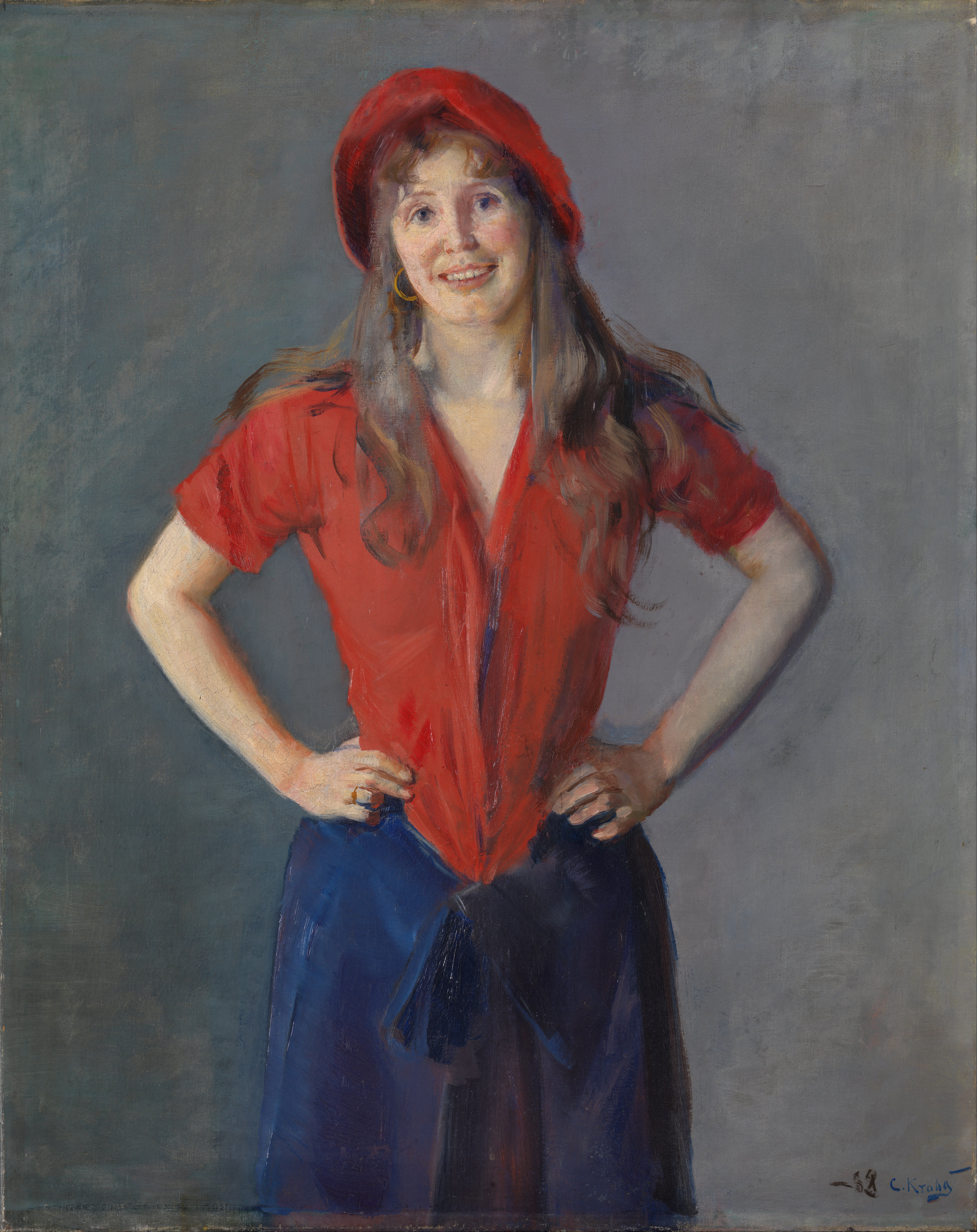
Oda Krohg

- 19 January – Martin Olsen Nalum, politician and Minister (born 1854)
- 15 February – Johan Gjøstein, educator, newspaper editor and politician (born 1866)
- 23 February – Anders Venger, politician and Minister (born 1872)
- 8 March – Thorolf Holmboe, painter (born 1866)
- 13 May – Johan Wilhelm Normann Munthe, soldier and art collector (born 1864)
- 14 May – Fanny Ingvoldstad, painter (born 1857).
- 19 June – Harald Sohlberg, painter (born 1869)
- 4 July – Anna Paaske, opera singer and music teacher (born 1856).
- 24 July – Birger Brodtkorb, track and field athlete (born 1891)
- 17 August – Johan Martin Jakobsen Strand, farmer and politician (born 1873)
- 3 September – Jens Tvedt, novelist and short story writer (born 1857).
- 7 September – Per Winge, conductor, pianist and composer (born 1858)
- 24 September – Caroline Schytte Jensen, writer and composer (born 1848).
- 19 October – Oda Krohg, painter (born 1860)
- 4 December – Johan Halvorsen, composer, conductor and violinist (born 1864)
