= Dobloug =

Dobloug is a surname. Notable people with the surname include:

- Jørgen Dobloug (1945–2018), Norwegian artist
- Mikkel Dobloug (politician) (1844–1913), Norwegian merchant, wholesaler, philanthropist, and politician
- Mikkel Dobloug (skier) (born 1944), Norwegian Nordic combined skier
