= Mr. Lee =

Mr. Lee may refer to:

- Mr. Lee (rapper), (born Leroy Haggard Jr.), American hip house DJ, rapper and record producer from Chicago
- Mr. Lee (music producer), (born Leroy Williams Jr.), American hip hop producer and entrepreneur from Houston
- Mr. Lee (restaurant), a Chinese restaurant chain
- "Mr. Lee" (song), by The Bobbettes
- Mr. Lee (noodle brand), a brand of instant noodles in Norway
  - Chul Ho Lee, whom the noodle brand is named for

== See also ==
- List of people with surname Lee
