= Terje Larsen =

Terje Larsen may refer to:

- Terje Larsen, known as The Wanderer (criminal) (1958–2018), Norwegian serial burglar
- Terje Larsen (tennis) (born 1951), Swedish tennis player
- Terje Rød-Larsen (born 1947), Norwegian diplomat
- Terje Holtet Larsen (born 1963), Norwegian journalist and novelist
