= Danguolė =

- Gender: Female
- Language: Lithuanian
- Name day: 16 July

Origin
- Region of origin: Lithuania

Danguolė is a Lithuanian feminine given name. People bearing the name Danguolė include:

- Danguolė Brogienė (born 1959), Lithuanian textile designer
- Danguolė Rasalaitė (1983–2000), Lithuanian girl who made headlines after being sold into sexual slavery
- Danguolė Raudonikienė (born 1937), Lithuanian painter
