= Wiik =

Wiik is a Norwegian, a Swedish and a Finnish surname.

People with the surname Wiik include:

== Academics ==
- Björn Wiik, a Norwegian physicist
- Fredrik Johan Wiik, a Finnish geologist
- Kalevi Wiik, a Finnish linguist

== Performers ==
- Aurélien Wiik, a French actor
- Håvard Wiik, a Norwegian musician
- Øystein Wiik, a Norwegian actor and singer
- Ryan Wiik, an actor

== Politicians ==
- Johan Wiik, a Finnish politician
- Karl H. Wiik, a Finnish politician
- Jofrid Wiik, a Norwegian politician
- Lise Wiik, a Norwegian politician

== Sportspeople ==
- Melissa Wiik, a Norwegian footballer
- Lisa Wiik, a Norwegian snowboarder
- Rolf Wiik, a Finnish fencer

== Others ==
- Maria Wiik, a Finnish painter
