= Handeland =

Handeland is a surname of Norwegian origin. Notable people with the surname include:

- Gisle Handeland (born 1943), Norwegian politician
- Lori Handeland (born 1961), American writer
