= Wenche Bredrup =

Norwegian politician (1934–1991)

Wenche Bredrup (15 December 1934 – 25 January 1991) was a Norwegian politician for the Progress Party.

She served as a deputy representative to the Parliament of Norway from Hordaland during the term 1981–1985. In total, she met during 4 days of parliamentary session. She was also a member of Hordaland county council. Outside of politics, she worked with tourism of Western Norway.
