= Republic of Gulating =

Republic of Gulating is an artistic project with serious political aims. On 4 June 2005 Western Norway was declared an independent state, "Republikken Gulating". This took place during a regional festival, "Kystfestivalen 61° Nord" in Gulen Municipality, north of the county capital of Bergen. The instigator behind the project, Øyvind Heitmann, was declared «pride minister» by Magnor Midtun, local historian, acting as president of the region in a Viking play, Hakonarspelet. The project wants to increase the independence of the region through political and cultural influence.

== The region ==
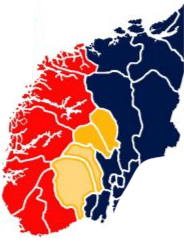
Map from the project website

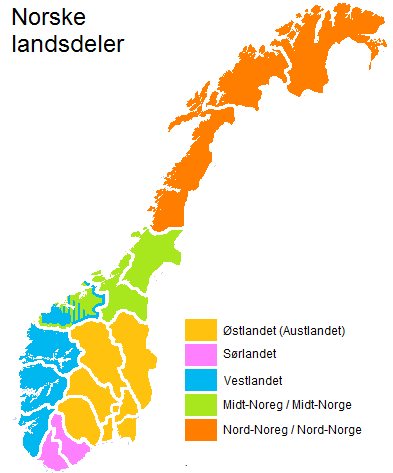
Norwegian regions: The major part of Gulating corresponds to the blue and purple areas

The two Norwegian languages with Nynorsk in blue.

The republic covered Western and Southern Norway (the counties Hordaland, Sogn og Fjordane, Rogaland, Vest-Agder, Aust-Agder), the regions Sunnmøre, Valdres and Hallingdal, and the islands of Shetland and the Faroes. This was the domain of the law of Gulating in 1267, which was the foundation for the old "Republic of Gulating" for around four centuries. In addition, the republic intends an association with the historical regions of Telemark and Numedal, which had no firm connection to any of the domains of law in Norway. The last two areas are also important parts of the stronghold of the Nynorsk language, which is a key element in the Western identity in Norway, thus the Republic of Gulating declared itself the world's first "Nynorsk country".

Torill Selsvold Nyborg has been an eager spokesperson for a new regional level in the Government of Norway. In 2005 she chaired Vestlandsrådet, an advisory political council for the four main counties in the region. She then accepted a visit from "pride minister" Øyvind Heitmann from the Republic of Gulating.

== Anthem and flag ==
The flag

The song Nordmannen, at least as well known by its opening words "Mellom bakkar og berg", was in 2005 chosen as the national anthem for the republic. It is generally considered the third most important national song in Western Norway, after the Norwegian national anthem itself, Ja, vi elsker, and the Nynorsk and Christian alternative Gud signe vårt dyre fedreland.

The pride minister took part in a protest march against "monster masts" in Hardanger on 14 August 2010. It was the first time the flag (red-white-gold Scandinavian cross) was used in public outside Gulen Municipality.
