= Magnar Lussand =

Norwegian politician (1945–2019)

Magnar Lussand (18 July 1945 – 24 September 2019) was a Norwegian school principal and politician for the Centre Party.

He was born in Lussand in Ullensvang Municipality, and after graduating from teachers' college in 1971 he spent six years as a teacher in Kinsarvik. From 1977 he was an inspector and principal in the neighboring Granvin Municipality.

Lussand was a member of the municipal council of Ullensvang Municipality from 1976 to 1977, on the municipal council of Granvin Municipality from 1980 to 1991, and on the Hordaland county council from 1984. He served as the mayor of Granvin Municipality. In 1991 Lussand became county mayor (fylkesordfører) of Hordaland. He was succeeded by Gisle Handeland in 1999, who was the first Labour Party representative to hold this position.

He served as a deputy representative to the Parliament of Norway from Hordaland during the term 1997–2001. In total he met during 38 days of parliamentary session. He died in 2019.

Political offices
Preceded by Ole Dramdal	County mayor of Hordaland; 1991–1999	Succeeded by Gisle Handeland
