= Torill Selsvold Nyborg =

Norwegian politician

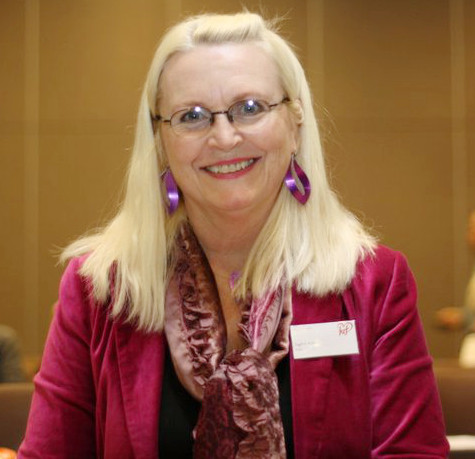

County Mayor of Hordaland
- In office 2003–2011
- Preceded by: Gisle Handeland
- Succeeded by: Tom-Christer Nilsen

Personal details
- Born: 23 February 1952 (age 74) Kvam Municipality, Hordaland, Norway
- Party: Christian Democratic Party
- Spouse: Geir Magnus Nyborg

Torill Selsvold Nyborg (born 23 February 1952) is a Norwegian nurse, missionary and politician for the Christian Democratic Party.

She was born in Kvam Municipality as a daughter of electrician Johannes Selsvold (1914–1997) and housewife Dorthea Selsvold (1922–1997). She took primary school in her native Ålvik and secondary school (lower and upper) in Øystese, graduating in 1970. She then attended a Red Cross nurse college for three years. She worked mainly as a nurse, first in Oslo from 1973 to 1977 before being a missionary in Arequipa from 1977 to 1982. She then moved to Fjell Municipality to become a nurse in 1983.

She was a deputy member of the municipal council of Fjell Municipality from 1987 to 1991, and elected member from 1991 to 1995. She served as deputy county mayor from 2001 to 2003, and county mayor of Hordaland from 2003 to 2011. She chaired the countywide party chapter 2002–2006 and sat on the national party board.

She also served as a deputy representative to the Parliament of Norway from Hordaland during the terms 1997 to 2001, 2001 to 2005, and 2005 to 2009. In October 2005 she briefly covered for Laila Dåvøy who was an outgoing member of Bondevik's Second Cabinet. In total Nyborg met during 27 days of parliamentary session.

Torill Selsvold Nyborg has been an eager spokesperson for a new regional level in the Government of Norway, and in 2005 she chaired Vestlandsrådet, an advisory political council for the four main counties in the region. She then accepted a visit from "pride minister" Øyvind Heitmann from Republic of Gulating, who is also promoting wider independence for Western Norway. She is also working to establish new railway lines in Hordaland, i.e. between Bergen and Norheimsund.

Outside politics she was employed as a lecturer in nursing at the Diakonissehjemmet University College in 1994. She has been a board member of Bergenshalvøens Kommunale Kraftselskap, chaired the supervisory council of Bergen International Festival and been a supervisory council member of Modum Bad.

She was married to the media scholar Geir Magnus Nyborg until his death in 2018.

Political offices
Preceded by Gisle Handeland	County mayor of Hordaland; 2003–2011	Succeeded by Tom-Christer Nilsen
