= Philip Holst-Cappelen =

Norwegian fraudster and kidnapper

- Born: 1965
- Died: 19 July 2018 (aged 53); Saltvikanstalten in Härnösand, Sweden
- Occupation: Prisoner
- Status: Incarcerated
- Criminal charges: Fraud, kidnapping
- Penalty: Most recently sentenced to 18 years in prison

Philip Holst-Cappelen (born André Simjak in 1965) was a Norwegian convicted serial fraudster and kidnapper who had received significant media attention in Scandinavia. He changed names several times, and he had no connection to the Norwegian families Holst or Cappelen.

In 2000, he was placed on an Interpol red notice, and after one year he was arrested at Copenhagen Airport. He was convicted of 120 crimes and sentenced to 4.5 years imprisonment in 2002. Holst-Cappelen escaped from prison while serving his sentence at Bastøy Prison. In 2008 he was arrested again by armed police in Oslo, after having defrauded Norwegian billionaire Jan Haudemann-Andersen.

In 2011 Holst-Cappelen was accused of kidnapping two Swedish millionaires. According to police the two men were imprisoned in their own homes and forced to [bank] transfer 15.6 million Swedish kronor. He was placed on a new Interpol red notice in 2010. In 2011 he was arrested by Spanish police. In June 2011 Holst-Cappelen was sentenced to 18 years imprisonment in Sweden.

Holst-Cappelen died on 19 July 2018 following a hunger strike while incarcerated in Saltvik Prison.

In 2025, Norwegian Broadcasting Corporation NRK released a 4-part series about his life with the title "Fantomet Philip." The series combines documentary material such as interviews with dramatized sequences, where Holst-Cappelen is portrayed by actor Henrik Holm.
