= Andreas Nærstad =

Norwegian sports administrator

Andreas Nærstad (5 March 1920 – 25 September 1983) was a Norwegian sports administrator.

With a background in ski jumping, he served as president of the Norwegian Ski Federation from 1970 to 1974. He also chaired the football department of Strømmen IF. Outside of sports, he worked as an accountant.

Sporting positions
Preceded by Dag Berggrav	President of the Norwegian Ski Federation; 1970–1974	Succeeded by Arne Nyland
