= Karin Holter =

Karin Magda Holter (born 11 March 1935) was a Norwegian philologist.

She was born in Oslo and finished her secondary education in 1953. Studying at the University of Oslo, she took the cand.mag. degree in 1959 and the cand.philol. degree in French in 1966. She also worked as a teacher at Fana Gymnas from 1963 to 1965.

She was hired at the Institute of Classical and Romance Languages, University of Oslo in 1968 and held professorship from 1992. Her field of study was French literature originating from France and North Africa. Her 1969 book Meursault – en fremmed?, published by Universitetsforlaget about Albert Camus' L'étranger and its character Meursault, received positive reviews. She also translated the book to Norwegian, as well as other books from French including Claude Simon's Le Jardin des Plantes. She was inducted into the Norwegian Academy of Science and Letters in 1998.
