= Arne Martin Klausen =

Norwegian social anthropologist (1927–2018)

- Born: 19 December 1927; Porsgrunn, Norway
- Died: 15 June 2018 (aged 90); Fredrikstad, Norway
- Occupation: Social anthropologist

Arne Martin Klausen (19 December 1927 – 15 June 2018) was a Norwegian social anthropologist.

Klausen was born in Porsgrunn as a son of Klaus Martinius Klausen and Anna Olsen. He was appointed professor at the University of Oslo from 1973. Among his publications are Kerala Fishermen and the Indo-Norwegian Pilot Project from 1968, on the foreign aid Indo-Norwegian Project, and several studies related to the 1994 Winter Olympics at Lillehammer. He is a member of the Norwegian Academy of Science and Letters.
