= Per S. Enger =

Norwegian zoophysiologist (1929–2018)

Per Engebret Stockfleth Enger (24 February 1929 – 19 November 2018) was a Norwegian zoophysiologist.

He was born in Oslo as a son of painter Erling Enger (1899–1990) and office clerk Aud Stockfleth (1899–1987). He earned his dr.philos. degree in 1963 with the thesis Single unit activity in the fish auditory system. He was hired at the University of Oslo in 1956, and served as a professor of zoophysiology from 1975 to 1994. He was a fellow of the Norwegian Academy of Science and Letters.
