= Jan Haudemann-Andersen =

Norwegian investor

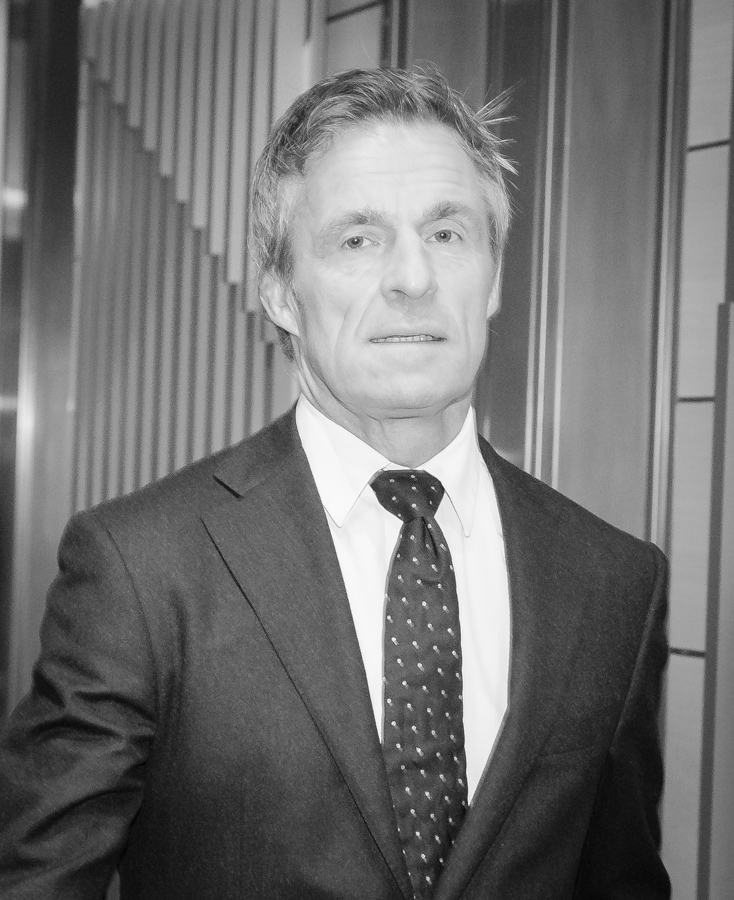
- Haudemann-Andersen in 2018

Jan Haudemann-Andersen (born 27 March 1958 in Skedsmokorset) is a Norwegian investor. He is a major private investor on the Oslo Stock Exchange and in property.

== Background ==
Haudemann-Andersen gained his siviløkonom from Agder distriktshøgskole and BI Norwegian Business School, and attended the Royal Norwegian Naval Academy at Oscarsborg Fortress. He started as a speculative investor with a loan from his stepbrother Stein Haudemann-Andersen (born 1955), who ran the investment firm Adria.

In 1986, Haudemann-Andersen established the investment firm Verde with Stein Olav Revelsby (born 1962), Geir Aune (born 1958) and Tore Aksel Voldberg (born 1963). Together, they invested in the oil company Norsk Vikingolje. In 1990, (directly before the Gulf War) they sold out, Norsk Vikingolje became a pure investment company, and changed its name to Frontier. Later, Engebret O. Fekene (born 1957) joined. They focused on shipping, but in 1994, also bought into Morgenbladet.

In 1986, Haudemann-Andersen had also established Datum Invest. Other investment firms he started in the 1990s were Decibel, Datum and Wega. In 1997, be established the company Datum together with lawyer and investor Einar Jørgen Greve (born 1960), where Harald Arnet (born 1961) had been director, and later a collaborator with Haudemann-Andersen and the other "Vikakameratene". At the same time, he also established the daughter company Trojan A/S (later Wega Oil). Haudemann-Andersen is also in charge of the everyday management here.(in Turkish)

In 1995, Haudemann-Andersen became the major shareholder in Tandberg Data, and bought further in via Decibel. He was chairman until 2001, but by 1998 had already begun to sell out before the company fell. He was also heavily involved in Ask (later Proxima): a projector- or video company that was separated from Tandberg. He sold out of the company in 1999.

From 1996, Haudemann-Andersen experienced good development of the German IT-company Nexus, where he had most of the shares, purchased through Wega. At the same time, he became major shareholder in Decibel and another IT-firm, the Norwegian Birdstep, until he sold out in 2003. Between 2005 and 2007 he was also major shareholder in Norwegian chip companies Q-Free and Fara. In 2006 he bought up the mining company Wega, and sat on the board there. From 2004, he and a partner bought into the Swedish oil company PA Resources, which made good finds in Tunis. In 2006, he established, (via Datum), the gold mining company Wega Mining, which are based in Burkina Faso, which he sold out of in 2012. In 2016, he sold out of the hydrogen company Nel, which he had bought 50 million shares in the year before.

Haudemann-Andersen married Anne Margaret Caroline Stang (born 1960) in 1989. In 2014, he married violinist Marte Krogh (born 1975), whom he had been in a relationship with since 2009. They divorced in 2016.
