= Christian Mohn =

Norwegian ski jumper

Christian J. Mohn
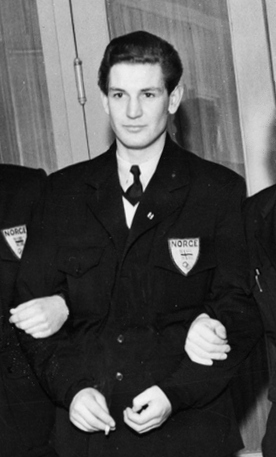
- Mohn as a reserve at the 1948 Winter Olympics.

Personal information
- Nationality: Norwegian
- Born: 20 April 1926 Oslo, Norway
- Died: 31 December 2018 (aged 92)

Sport
- Sport: Ski jumping
- Club: IL Heming

Christian J. Mohn (20 April 1926 – 31 December 2018) was a Norwegian ski jumper and sports official. His career highlights included a fourth place at the FIS Nordic World Ski Championships 1950, a second place at the Holmenkollen Ski Festival in 1952, and 20th place at the FIS Nordic World Ski Championships 1954. He represented IL Heming and also practised golf, yacht racing, tennis, bandy, and handball.

Mohn served as president of the Norwegian Ski Federation from 1978–80, and as chairman of the Friends of Ski Jumping. He died at the age of 92.

In 1951 Mohn competed in Portland Oregon in front of 55,000 people in the Civic Stadium. He jumped from a platform 155 feet above the field. He won the two night tourney. A cement marker was placed in the sidewalk outside the stadium commemorating the event.

Sporting positions
Preceded by Arne Nyland	President of the Norwegian Ski Federation; 1978–1980	Succeeded by Kjell Johnsrud
