= Ole E. Storlien =

Norwegian politician (1935–2018)

Ole E. Storlien (26 September 1935 – 2 October 2018) was a Norwegian politician for the Centre Party.

He served as a deputy representative to the Parliament of Norway from Hedmark during the terms 1981–1985 and 1985–1989. In total he met during 19 days of parliamentary session.

As a farmer from Ringsaker Municipality, he chaired Hedmark Agrarian Association. During the 1985 party ballot nomination, Storlien was presented as the socially conservative candidate, and almost edged out MP Ragnhild Queseth Haarstad.
