= Frøystein Wedervang =

Norwegian economist (1918–2018)

Frøystein Wedervang (14 March 1918 – 8 May 2018) was a Norwegian economist.

He was born in Hedrum Municipality as a son of Ingvar Wedervang. He graduated with the siv.øk. degree from the Norwegian School of Economics in 1940 and the cand.oecon. degree from the University of Oslo in 1943. Following the dr.philos. degree in 1957 he worked as a docent in business administration from 1958 to 1964 and economics from 1965 to 1985, both at the Norwegian School of Economics.
