= Elisabeth Sveri =

Norwegian army officer

Haldis Elisabeth Arentz Sveri (21 October 1927 – 30 January 2018) was a Norwegian military officer. She was known for being a pioneer among Norwegian women in the military.

Despite her young age, Sveri was a member of Milorg during World War II. In 1946, she started a regular military career as platoon leader in Kvinnekompaniet. She was later in Hærens Samband. From 1959 to 1987 she served as inspector of women in the Norwegian Army. In 1982, she reached the rank of lieutenant colonel, and became the first female senior official in the Norwegian military.

Sveri was also an advisor to Queen Sonja from 1980 to 1987. From 1961 to 1987 the represented the Norwegian Army in the Committee on Women in the NATO Forces. She has been a member of the World Federalist Movement council since 1992 and has also been president. She has been active in Norges Forsvarsforening, chairing the Oslo branch from 1989 to 1997. She chaired the Akershus county chapter of the Pensioners Party from 1998 to 2007, and has been a member of Akershus county council. She has been decorated with the National Service Medal, Forsvarsmedaljen, Forsvarsmedaljen med laurbærgren and the Knight of the 1st Class of the Royal Norwegian Order of St. Olav.

She resided in Eiksmarka. She died in 2018.
