= Ingri Lande =

Norwegian politician (1918–2018)

Ingri Lande, née Liden (25 October 1918 – 31 March 2018) was a Norwegian politician for the Christian Democratic Party.

She served as a deputy representative to the Parliament of Norway from Vestfold during the term 1977–1981. In total she met during 24 days of parliamentary session. She was a member of the central board, became honorary member of Vestfold Christian Democratic Party in 1997 and the Christian Democratic Party nationwide in 2003. In 2000 she received the King's Medal of Merit and in 2006 the Y's Men International Badge of Honour.

She married Odd Lande in 1944, lived in Bergen from 1946 to 1957. Then they moved to Nøtterøy Municipality where they lived for over sixty years. She died at Nøtterøy in 2018 at the age of 99 years old.
