= Odd Sefland =

Norwegian politician

Odd Sefland (15 May 1935-2004) was a Norwegian politician for the Conservative Party.

He served as a deputy representative to the Norwegian Parliament from Sogn og Fjordane during the term 1977–1981.
