= Arne Nyland =

Norwegian sports administrator (1924–2018)

Arne Nyland (13 August 1924 – 12 April 2018) was a Norwegian sports administrator.

He served Fossum IF as a skiing coach, training his own daughters. He became chairman of Fossum IF, then of Asker and Bærum District of Skiing. In 1972 he was elected board member of the Norwegian Ski Federation, serving as president from 1974 to 1978. He also contributed in other sports, chairing Fossum IF's event committee for the 1985 Norwegian Championships in Athletics.

Sporting positions
Preceded by Andreas Nærstad	President of the Norwegian Ski Federation; 1974–1978	Succeeded by Christian Mohn
