= Arne Haugestad =

Arne Haugestad (19 June 1935 – 20 September 2008) was a Norwegian Supreme Court lawyer, best known as the leader of the Norwegian movement against the European Economic Community from 1970 to 1973 and as defender for Arne Treholt, who was convicted for espionage in 1985.
