= Paula Nordhus =

Norwegian politician

Paula Nordhus (28 March 1935 – 21 March 1994) was a Norwegian politician for the Christian Democratic Party.

She served as a deputy representative to the Norwegian Parliament from Troms during the terms 1981–1985 and 1985–1989.
