= Nordmannen =

Poem by Ivar Aasen

Nordmannen ("The Norwegian") is a Norwegian poem written by Ivar Aasen. The poem is better known in Norway as Mellom bakkar og berg (Literally "Between hills and mountains"), and was published for the first time in the collection of poems called Symra in 1863. Some parts of this poem are widely sung in Norway, and the two first stanzas were engraved on all Norwegian driving licences from 1998 to 30 June 2007.

== The Poem ==
Nordmannen has been published in several versions, three of which are recognized as official.

1. Millom Bakkar og Berg ut med Havet
heve Nordmannen fenget sin Heim,
der han sjølv heve Tufterna gravet
og sett sjølv sine Hus uppaa deim.

2. Han saag ut paa dei steinutte Strender;
det var ingen, som der hadde bygt.
«Lat oss rydja og byggja oss Grender,
og so eiga me Rudningen trygt.»

3. Han saag ut paa det baarutte Havet;
der var ruskutt aa leggja ut paa;
men der leikade Fisk ned i Kavet,
og den Leiken den vilde han sjaa.

4. Fram paa Vetteren stundom han tenkte:
Giv eg var i eit varmare Land!
Men naar Vaarsol i Bakkarne blenkte,
fekk han Hug til si heimlege Strand.

5. Og naar Liderna grønka som Hagar,
naar det laver av Blomar paa Straa,
og naar Næter er ljosa som Dagar,
kann han ingenstad vænare sjaa.

English poetic translation:

1. Amidst hills and mountains, out with the sea
has the Norwegian founded his home,
there, by himself, foundations he dug
and by himself, his houses, there built upon.

2. He looked on to the stoney beaches;
there was no one there who had built.
«Let us clear and build a homestead,
and as such, own the bend ahead.»

3. He looked out on to the stormy ocean;
there, rough to lay out upon;
but there played fish in the ocean,
and that play, he wanted to look upon

4. Into the winter, at times he wondered:
Give that I were in a warmer land!
But when the spring’s sun on the hills shone,
his soul would long for his coastal home

5. And when mountainsides grow green like gardens,
when overcome with flowers, budded on their straws,
and when nights are as bright as days,
there is no prettier place he ever saw.
