= Danguolė Raudonikienė =

Lithuanian painter

Danguolė Raudonikienė (born 1937) is a Lithuanian painter and Naïve art representative.

She was born in Rokiškis region. At the age of 11 she and her family were exiled to East Siberia. In 1960 Raudonikienė graduated from the Irkutsk Foreign Language Institute, and she then returned to Lithuania. She was an English and German teacher and worked as an interpreter and translator. Danguolė Raudonikienė is the author of 21 solo art exhibitions and the participant of more than 60 group exhibitions in Lithuania and abroad. In the Folk Art Exhibition in Moscow in 1987 her drawing "Horse Races" won the Bronze medal. In 2005 she was awarded the Adomas Varnas National Artist of the Year Prize. The same year she was granted the status as the Art Creator of Lithuania.

Danguolė Raudonikienė's paintings can be found in the Lithuanian Art Museum, the M. K. Čiurlionis National Art Museum, the Helsinki Art Museum, the Rokiškis Regional Museum, and in private collections in Europe, the USA, and Russia.

Danguolė Raudonikienė is the mother of the electronic and orchestral composer Dalia Raudonikytė With.
