= Rolf Yngvar Berg =

Norwegian botanist (1925–2018)

Rolf Yngvar Berg (2 December 1925 – 25 August 2018) was a Norwegian botanist.

He was born in Oslo. He took the dr.philos. degree 1962 on the work Studies in Liliaceae, tribe Parideae. He was a curator at the Botanical Museum of Oslo from 1956 to 1962, professor of botany at the University of California, Davis from 1962 to 1965 and at the University of Oslo from 1965 to 1994. He has been a corresponding fellow of the American Botanical Society from 2003, and a fellow of the Norwegian Academy of Science and Letters. He died at the age of 92.
