= Hordaland County Municipality =

Hordaland County Municipality Hordaland fylkeskommune
- Former County
- Coat of arms

- Location in Norway
- Country: Norway
- Disestablished: 1 Jan 2020
- Administrative center: Bergen

Government
  - County mayor: Anne Gine Hestetun
- ISO 3166 code: NO-12
- Revenue: NOK 3,300 million
- Employees: 4,200
- Schools: 46
- Pupils: 17,000
- Transit authority: Skyss

Hordaland County Municipality (Norwegian: Hordaland fylkeskommune) was the regional governing administration of the old Hordaland county in Norway. The county municipality was established in its most recent form on 1 January 1976 when the law was changed to allow elected county councils in Norway. The county municipality was dissolved on 1 January 2020, when Hordaland was merged with the neighboring Sogn og Fjordane county, creating the new Vestland county which is led by the Vestland County Municipality.

== County government ==
The county municipality's most important tasks include secondary education, recreation (sports and outdoor life), and cultural heritage. The county municipality is also responsible for all county roads (including ferry operations) and public transport (including school busses). The county municipality has further responsibility for regional land-use planning, business development, power production, and environmental management. The county also has responsibility for providing dental health services (in 2002, responsibility for hospitals and public medicine was transferred from the counties to the new regional health authorities).

=== County council ===
The Hordaland county council (Norwegian: Fylkestinget) is made up of 57 representatives that are elected by direct election by all legal residents of the county every fourth year. The council is the legislative body for the county. The county council typically meets about six times a year. Council members are divided into standing committees and an executive committee (fylkesutvalg), which meet considerably more often. Both the council and executive committee (with at least 5 members) are led by the county mayor (Nynorsk: fylkesordførar). The executive committee carries out the executive functions of the county under the direction of the whole council. The tables below show the current and historical composition of the council by political party.

Hordaland fylkesting 2015–2019
Party name (in Nynorsk)	Number of representatives
Labour Party (Arbeidarpartiet)	20
Progress Party (Framstegspartiet)	7
Green Party (Miljøpartiet Dei Grøne)	3
Conservative Party (Høgre)	12
Christian Democratic Party (Kristeleg Folkeparti)	4
Red Party (Raudt)	1
Centre Party (Senterpartiet)	4
Socialist Left Party (Sosialistisk Venstreparti)	3
Liberal Party (Venstre)	3
Total number of members:	57

Hordaland fylkesting 2012–2015
Party name (in Nynorsk)	Number of representatives
Labour Party (Arbeidarpartiet)	16
Progress Party (Framstegspartiet)	8
Green Party (Miljøpartiet Dei Grøne)	1
Conservative Party (Høgre)	17
Christian Democratic Party (Kristeleg Folkeparti)	5
Red Party (Raudt)	1
Centre Party (Senterpartiet)	3
Socialist Left Party (Sosialistisk Venstreparti)	2
Liberal Party (Venstre)	4
Total number of members:	57

Hordaland fylkesting 2008–2011
Party name (in Nynorsk)	Number of representatives
Labour Party (Arbeidarpartiet)	14
Progress Party (Framstegspartiet)	14
Conservative Party (Høgre)	11
Christian Democratic Party (Kristeleg Folkeparti)	5
Red Party (Raudt)	2
Centre Party (Senterpartiet)	4
Socialist Left Party (Sosialistisk Venstreparti)	4
Liberal Party (Venstre)	3
Total number of members:	57

Hordaland fylkesting 2004–2007
Party name (in Nynorsk)	Number of representatives
Labour Party (Arbeidarpartiet)	13
Progress Party (Framstegspartiet)	13
Conservative Party (Høgre)	11
Christian Democratic Party (Kristeleg Folkeparti)	5
Pensioners' Party (Pensjonistpartiet)	1
Red Electoral Alliance (Raud Valallianse)	2
Centre Party (Senterpartiet)	4
Socialist Left Party (Sosialistisk Venstreparti)	6
Liberal Party (Venstre)	2
Total number of members:	57

Hordaland fylkesting 2000–2003
Party name (in Nynorsk)	Number of representatives
Labour Party (Arbeidarpartiet)	18
Progress Party (Framstegspartiet)	11
Conservative Party (Høgre)	13
Christian Democratic Party (Kristeleg Folkeparti)	9
Pensioners' Party (Pensjonistpartiet)	1
Red Electoral Alliance (Raud Valallianse)	2
Centre Party (Senterpartiet)	5
Socialist Left Party (Sosialistisk Venstreparti)	5
Liberal Party (Venstre)	3
Total number of members:	67

Hordaland fylkesting 1996–1999
Party name (in Nynorsk)	Number of representatives
Labour Party (Arbeidarpartiet)	18
Progress Party (Framstegspartiet)	9
Conservative Party (Høgre)	12
Christian Democratic Party (Kristeleg Folkeparti)	9
Pensioners' Party (Pensjonistpartiet)	1
Red Electoral Alliance (Raud Valallianse)	1
Centre Party (Senterpartiet)	8
Socialist Left Party (Sosialistisk Venstreparti)	4
Liberal Party (Venstre)	5
Total number of members:	67

Hordaland fylkesting 1992–1995
Party name (in Nynorsk)	Number of representatives
Labour Party (Arbeidarpartiet)	24
Progress Party (Framstegspartiet)	8
Conservative Party (Høgre)	16
Christian Democratic Party (Kristeleg Folkeparti)	10
Pensioners' Party (Pensjonistpartiet)	2
Red Electoral Alliance (Raud Valallianse)	1
Centre Party (Senterpartiet)	10
Socialist Left Party (Sosialistisk Venstreparti)	10
Liberal Party (Venstre)	3
Fatherland Party (Fedrelandspartiet)	1
Total number of members:	85

Hordaland fylkesting 1988–1991
Party name (in Nynorsk)	Number of representatives
Labour Party (Arbeidarpartiet)	26
Progress Party (Framstegspartiet)	13
Conservative Party (Høgre)	20
Christian Democratic Party (Kristeleg Folkeparti)	10
Red Electoral Alliance (Raud Valallianse)	1
Centre Party (Senterpartiet)	5
Socialist Left Party (Sosialistisk Venstreparti)	5
Liberal Party (Venstre)	5
Total number of members:	85

Hordaland fylkesting 1984–1987
Party name (in Nynorsk)	Number of representatives
Labour Party (Arbeidarpartiet)	28
Progress Party (Framstegspartiet)	7
Conservative Party (Høgre)	23
Christian Democratic Party (Kristeleg Folkeparti)	11
Liberal People's Party (Liberale Folkepartiet)	1
Red Electoral Alliance (Raud Valallianse)	1
Centre Party (Senterpartiet)	5
Socialist Left Party (Sosialistisk Venstreparti)	5
Liberal Party (Venstre)	4
Total number of members:	85

Hordaland fylkesting 1980–1983
Party name (in Nynorsk)	Number of representatives
Labour Party (Arbeidarpartiet)	23
Progress Party (Framstegspartiet)	3
Conservative Party (Høgre)	29
Christian Democratic Party (Kristeleg Folkeparti)	12
Liberal People's Party (Liberale Folkepartiet)	2
Red Electoral Alliance (Raud Valallianse)	1
Centre Party (Senterpartiet)	6
Socialist Left Party (Sosialistisk Venstreparti)	3
Liberal Party (Venstre)	6
Total number of members:	85

Hordaland fylkesting 1976–1979
Party name (in Nynorsk)	Number of representatives
Labour Party (Arbeidarpartiet)	26
Anders Lange's Party (Anders Langes parti)	2
Conservative Party (Høgre)	22
Christian Democratic Party (Kristeleg Folkeparti)	15
New People's Party (Nye Folkepartiet)	5
Centre Party (Senterpartiet)	8
Socialist Left Party (Sosialistisk Venstreparti)	4
Liberal Party (Venstre)	3
Total number of members:	85

=== County mayor ===
Since 1976, the county mayor (Nynorsk: fylkesordførar) of Hordaland has been the political leader of the county and the chairperson of the county council. Prior to 1976, the County governor led the council which was made up of all of the mayors of the rural municipalities within the county. The final County Mayor was Anne Gine Hestetun of the Labour Party, while her deputy was Rune Haugsdal. Here is a list of people who have held this position:

- 1976–1991: Ole Dramdal (H)
- 1991–1999: Magnar Lussand (Sp)
- 1999–2003: Gisle Handeland (Ap)
- 2003–2011: Torill Selsvold Nyborg (KrF)
- 2011–2015: Tom-Christer Nilsen (H)
- 2015–2019: Anne Gine Hestetun (Ap)

== Transport ==
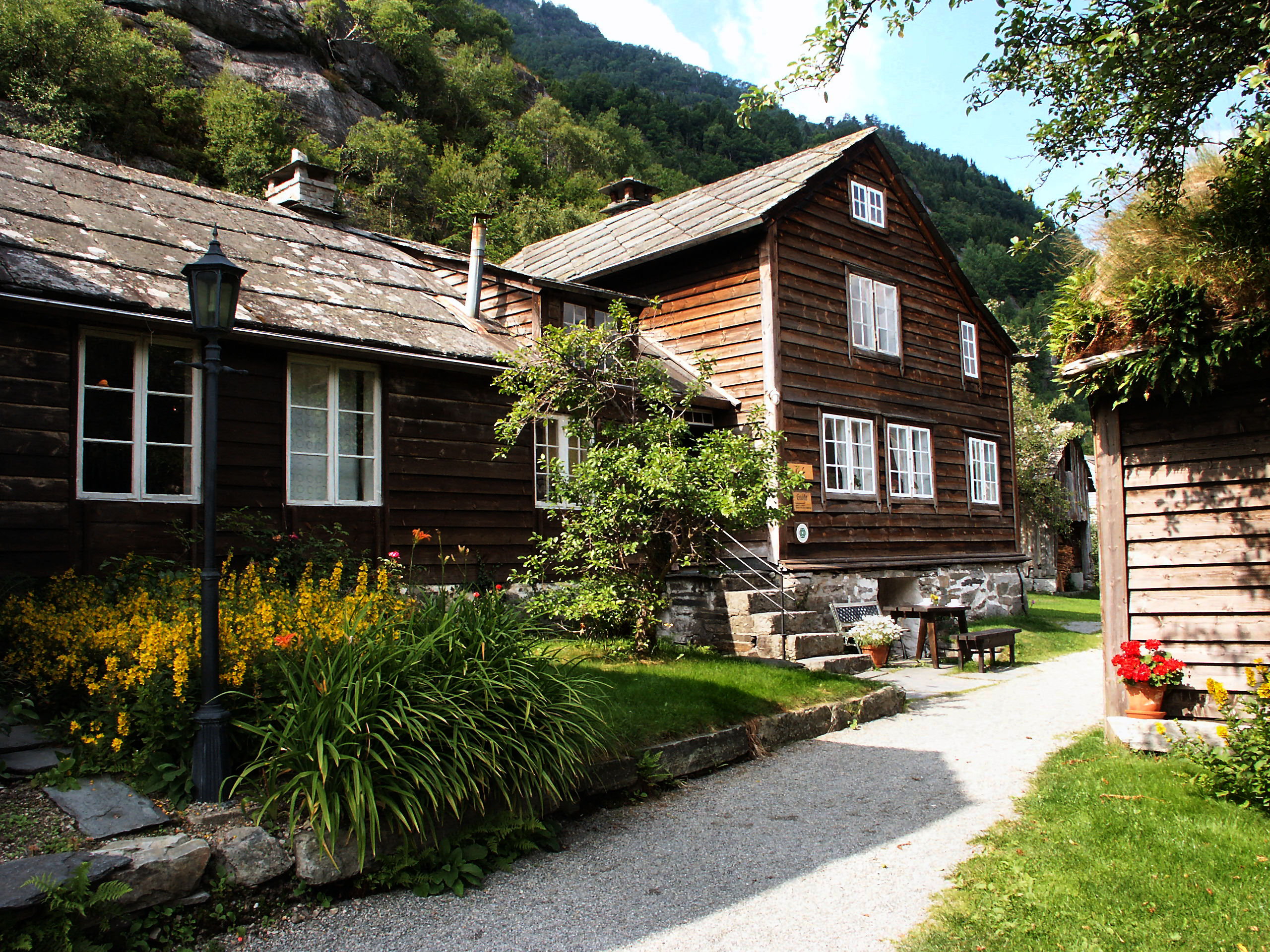
A house in Hordaland County

Public transport in Hordaland was the responsibility of the county municipality, including the city buses in the city of Bergen. Control of the city buses was transferred from the city to the county on 1 January 2008.

In 2007, the county municipality created the transit authority called "Skyss" that would market public transport while it would be operated by private companies based on public service obligation contracts. Prior to this, most routes had been operated by the private company Tide Buss and its predecessors.
