= Finn Tøraasen =

Norwegian footballer (1936-2018)

Personal information
- Full name: Finn Webjørn Tøraasen
- Date of birth: 1 June 1936
- Place of birth: Oslo, Norway
- Date of death: 2 May 2018 (aged 81)
- Place of death: Oslo, Norway
- Position: Left-back

Senior career*
Years	Team	Apps	(Gls)
1954–1964	Skeid	103	(11)
- * Club domestic league appearances and goals

Finn Webjørn Tøraasen (1 June 1936 – 2 May 2018) was a Norwegian footballer who played as a left-back for Skeid from 1954 to 1964. He won the Norwegian Cup twice: 1958 and 1963. He played a total of 103 matches in the Norwegian Premier League, scoring 11 goals.
