= Ivar Belck-Olsen =

Norwegian politician (1932–2018)

Ivar Belck-Olsen (18 January 1932 – 15 February 2018) was a Norwegian politician for the Christian Democratic Party.

He was born in Oslo, but the family moved to Knapstad in Hobøl. He became active in the Christian Democratic Party at the age of 15, and continued past his 80th birthday. He has chaired Hobøl Christian Democratic Party and Østfold Christian Democratic Party, been an elected member of Hobøl municipal council and Østfold county council, where he served as deputy county mayor. He served as a deputy representative to the Parliament of Norway from Østfold during the terms 1977–1981, 1981–1985 and 1985–1989. He met during 54 days of parliamentary session.
