= Kirsten Sødal =

Norwegian author (born 1935)

- Born: 14 June 1935
- Died: 22 February 2022 (aged 86)
- Occupation: Writer

Kirsten Sødal (14 June 1935 – 22 February 2022) was a Norwegian author who wrote several children's books, including Bestefar i spøkelsesbyen (Grandfather in the Ghost town) and the Birkebeinerbarn series. She also worked on school work books På Sporet (On Track).

== Early life ==
Kirsten Sødal (born Knudsen) was born in the coastal town Kristiansand in Norway. When she was five years old, World War II broke out. This influenced her writing greatly. Her father was a part of the Norwegian resistance movement and contributed by writing secret newspapers with true news. She wrote small stories and poems her entire life.

== Bibliography ==
Her works include: Bestefar I spøkelsesbyen, the Birkebeinerbarn series, Kamelgutten (The Camel Boy), a Christmas story with one chapter for each day of advent, Med Benjamin til Bethlehem (With Benjamin to Bethlehem), another Christmas story based on a play, På Sporet, Alf, a book based on the childhood of one of her good friends, Alf Huseth. In 2010 she released a collection of poems she wrote after her husband's death, Takk for blomstene i livet.

- Bestefar I spøkelsesbyen (Grandfather in the Ghost town), Lunde, 1996. ISBN 9788252044164
- Birkebeinerbarn (Birkebeiner Children), Verbum forlay, 1993. ISBN 8254306125
- Kamelgutten (The Camel Boy), IKO-forl, 2017. ISBN 9788282493192
- Med Benjamin til Bethlehem (With Benjamin to Bethlehem), Verbum forlay, 1991. ISBN 9788254305324
- På Sporet (On Track)
- Alf (2007), Stiftelsen Arkivet, 2007. ISBN 9788292306109
- Takk for blomstene i livet (Thank You for the Flowers of a Lifetime) (2010)
