= List of people on the postage stamps of Norway =

Norway has issued stamps since 1855, and the first person to appear on a Norwegian stamp was the joint Norwegian king Oscar I in 1856 ( katalogue FACIT) the second Norwegian-Swedish king Oscar II in 1878. The first non-royal person to appear on a Norwegian stamp was the playwright Henrik Ibsen, to commemorate the centenary of his birth in 1928 followed by the mathematician Niels Henrik Abel later the same year.

Queen Maud was the first woman to appear on a Norwegian stamp, in 1939, followed by her daughter-in-law Märtha in 1956. The first non-royal woman was author Camilla Collett in 1963.

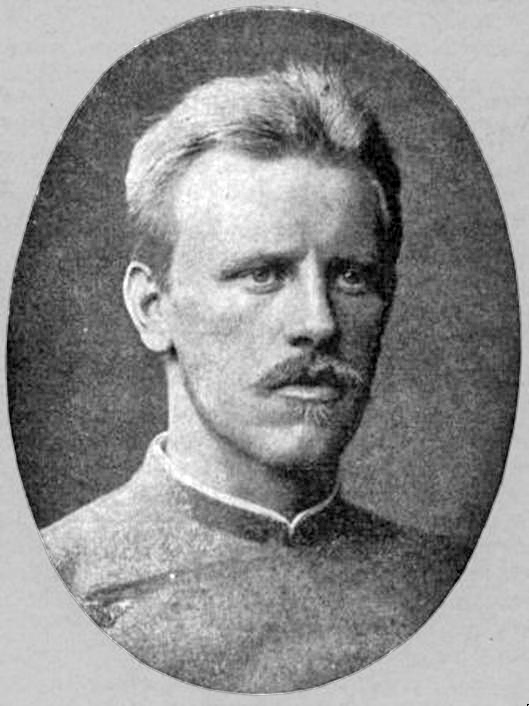
Except for royalty, none has been more frequent on Norwegians stamps than national hero Fridtjof Nansen (explorer, scientist, diplomat, Nobel laureate)

To the matter of "who's first", several non-royal persons appeared on a 1914 stamp commemorating the centenary of the Constitution of Norway, as the stamp depicted the renowned painting of the 1814 assembly. This list does however only include persons depicted as themselves per se, and does not include stamps where persons appear as a representative of their profession, such as post officers, brass band members etc. The list also excludes persons that are represented on paintings.

== A-E ==
- Niels Henrik Abel, mathematician – 1928, 1983, 2002, 2002
- Roald Amundsen, explorer – 1947, 1961, 1971
- Hjalmar Andersen, (stamp includes his a.k.a. "Hjallis"), winter athlete – 1990
- Herman Anker, Folk high school pioneer – 1964
- Colin Archer, boat constructor – 1941
- Klas Pontus Arnoldson Nobel laureate – 1968
- Olaus Arvesen, Folk high school pioneer – 1964
- Torgeir Augundsson a.k.a. "Myllarguten", fiddler – 1985
- Kjell Aukrust, artist/author – 1988 (through his work)
- Berit Aunli, winter athlete – 1989
- Aung San Suu Kyi, Nobel laureate – 2001
- Fredrik Bajer, Nobel laureate – 1968
- Norma Balean, actress – 2002
- Ivar Ballangrud, winter athlete – 1990
- Arnfinn Bergmann, winter athlete – 1992
- Vilhelm Bjerknes, meteorologist – 1962
- Ole Einar Bjørndalen, skiløper – 2006
- Bjørnstjerne Bjørnson, Nobel author – 1932, 1982, 2003
- Johan Borgen, author – 2002
- Hjalmar Branting, Nobel laureate – 1981
- Trygve Bratteli, prime minister – 2005
- Hallgeir Brenden, winter athlete – 1992
- Ole Jakob Broch, meter convention – 1975
- Waldemar Christofer Brøgger, geologist – 1974
- Ole Bull, fiddler – 1985
- Aase Bye, actress – 2001
- Lalla Carlsen, actress – 2001
- Johan Castberg, social welfare pioneer – 1993
- Christian IV, Danish–Norwegian king – 1988, 2000 (statue),
- Camilla Collett, author – 1963
- Egil Danielsen, athlete – 1961
- Petter Dass, baroque psalmist – 1948, 1997
- Carl Deichman, Oslo library patron – 1985
- Kari Diesen, actress – 2001
- Henry Dunant, Red Cross founder, Nobel laureate – 1961, 2001
- Olav Duun, author – 1976
- Johanne Dybwad, actress – 1967
- Bjørn Dæhlie, winter athlete – 1993
- Hans Egede, missionary to Greenland – 1986
- Thorbjørn Egner, children's author – 1984 (through his work)
- Stein Eriksen, winter athlete – 1992

== F-J ==
- Johan Falkberget, author – 1979
- Christian Magnus Falsen, constitution father – 1947
- Kirsten Flagstad, opera diva – 1995
- Svend Foyn, whaler – 1947
- Arne Garborg, author – 1951 (first Noreg stamp)
- Einar Gerhardsen, prime minister – 1997
- Henry Gleditsch, actor – 2002
- Victor Goldschmidt, geologist – 1974
- Mikhail Gorbachev, Nobel laureate – 2001
- Edvard Grieg, composer – 1943, 1983, 1993,
- Nordahl Grieg, author – 2002
- Johan Grøttumsbråten, winter athlete – 1991
- Cathinka Guldberg, nurse – 1968
- Cato Guldberg, chemist, law of mass action – 1964
- Johan Ernst Gunnerus, bishop, botanist, founder of scientific society – 1970
- Gro Hammerseng, Handball player – 2008
- Gerhard Armauer Hansen, physician, leprosy discoverer – 1973
- Christopher Hansteen, geophysicist – 1984
- Harald, king – 1982, 1992, 1993, 1994, 1995, 1997,
- Odd Hassel, Nobel laureate – 2004
- Thorleif Haug, winter athlete – 1990
- Axel Heiberg, founder of forest society – 1948
- Sonja Henie, winter athlete, ice princess, actress – 1990
- Johan Hjort, fisheries researcher – 1969
- Ludvig Holberg, Danish–Norwegian playwright – 1934, 1984,
- Haakon IV Haakonson, medieval king – 2004
- Haakon VII, king of Norway – 1907, 1909, 1910, 1937, 1943(1945), 1945, 1946, 1947, 1947, 1947, 1950, 1951, 1955, 1957, 1972, 1982, 1995, 1998, 2003, 2005, 2005, 2007
- Haakon, crown prince – 1997
- Henrik Ibsen, playwright – 1928, 1978
- Lillebil Ibsen, actress, dancer – 2001
- Ingrid Alexandra, princess – 2004, 2005
- Gunnar Isachsen, Arctic explorer – 2006
- Finn Christian Jagge, winter athlete – 1993
- Anne Jahren, winter athlete – 1989
- Bjørg Eva Jensen, speed skater – 1989
- Knut Johannesen a.k.a. "Kupper'n", winter athlete – 1991
- Leif Juster, actor – 2001

== K-O ==
- Geir Karlstad, winter athlete – 1993
- Alexander Kielland, author – 1949
- Th. Kierulf, geologist – 1974
- Martin Luther King Jr., Nobel laureate – 2001
- Theodor Kittelsen, troll illustrator – 2007
- Betzy Kjelsberg, social welfare pioneer – 1993
- Asbjørn Kloster, teetotaler – 1959
- Eirik Kvalfoss, winter athlete – 1989
- Magnus Brostrup Landstad, hymn author, folk tune collector – 2002
- Christian Lous Lange, Nobel laureate – 1981, 2004
- Lars Levi Læstadius, Sámi missionary – 2000
- Jonas Lie, author – 1983
- Trygve Lie, UN secretary general – 1995
- Magnus law-mender, medieval king – 1974
- Nelson Mandela, Nobel laureate – 2001
- Max Manus, war time hero, royal body guard – 2005
- Maud, queen – 1939, 1947, 1969, 1982, 2003
- Alfred Maurstad, actor – 2001
- Tordis Maurstad, actress – 2002
- Rigoberta Menchú, Nobel laureate – 2001
- Christian Michelsen, prime minister of independence year – 1982, 2005
- Edvard Munch, painter – 1963 (self portrait)
- Magne Myrmo, winter athlete – 1979
- Märtha, crown princess – 1956, 1982, 2003
- Fridtjof Nansen, naturalist, explorer, refugee aid, Nobel laureate – 1935, 1940, 1947, 1961, 1982, 2001
- Carsten Tank Nielsen, telegraph director – 1954
- Rolf Just Nilsen, actor – 2002
- Arvid Nilssen, actor – 2001
- Alfred Nobel, chemist, innovator, endowed the Nobel prizes – 2001
- Rikard Nordraak, composer – 1942
- Inger Helene Nybråten, winter athlete – 1989
- Olav V, king of Norway – 1946, 1958, 1959, 1969, 1970, 1973, 1978, 1979, 1982, 1982, 1983, 1983, 1985, 1988, 1995, 2003, 2005, 2005
- Lars Onsager, Nobel laureate – 2003
- Oscar II, king of Norway and Sweden – 1878

== P-T ==
- Frédéric Passy, Nobel laureate – 1961
- Cleng Peerson, emigration pioneer – 1947, 1975
- Britt Pettersen, winter athlete – 1989
- Vidkun Quisling, quisling – 1942, 1942
- Kjetil Rekdal, footballer – 2005
- Terje Rollem, 1945 liberation contributor – 1995
- Einar Rose, actor – 2001
- Birger Ruud, winter athlete – 1991
- Tom Sandberg, winter athlete – 1989
- Michael Sars, biologist, father of Georg Ossian Sars – 1970
- Georg Ossian Sars, biologist, son of Michael Sars – 1970
- Thorleif Schjelderup, winter athlete – 1951
- Tore Segelcke, actress – 2001
- Hannibal Sehested, chancellor – 1947
- Åse Gruda Skard, children's psychologist – 2005
- Amalie Skram, author – 1996
- Lars Olsen Skrefsrud, missionary – 1967
- Simon Slåttvik, winter athlete – 1992
- Snorri, saga author – 1941
- Magnar Solberg, winter athlete – 1991
- Sonja, queen – 1992, 1993, 1997
- Engebret Soot, canal engineer – 1986
- Hans Strøm, priest, topographic author – 1970
- Eilert Sundt, social scientist – 1964
- Johan Svendsen, composer – 1990
- Johan Sverdrup, politician – 1966, 1984,
- Otto Sverdrup, polar explorer – 2004
- Harald Sæverud, composer – 1997
- Nathan Söderblom, bishop, Nobel laureate – 1990
- Othilie Tonning, salvationist – 1988
- Kari Traa, winter athlete – 2005
- Lars Tvinde, actor – 2002

== U-Z ==
- Vegard Ulvang, winter athlete – 1993
- Sigrid Undset, Nobel author – 1982
- Fartein Valen, composer – 1987
- Halldis Moren Vesaas, poet – 2007
- Tarjei Vesaas, author – 1997
- Aasmund Olavsson Vinje, author – 1968
- J. H. L. Vogt, geologist – 1974
- Grete Waitz, runner – 1997
- Henrik Wergeland, poet, humanist – 1945
- Johan Herman Wessel, poet – 1942
- Peter Wessel Tordenskjold, navy hero – 1947, 1990
- Herman Wildenvey, poet – 1986
- Hanna Winsnes, author – 1989
- Richard With, coastal express pioneer – 1993
- Peter Waage, chemist, law of mass action – 1964
- Nic Waal, pediatric and adolescent psychiatrist – 2005

== Ø-Å ==
- Tore Ørjasæter, poet – 1986
- Arnulf Øverland, poet – 1989
- Per Aabel, actor – 2001
- Jakob Aall, statesman – 1973
- Ivar Aasen, linguist, author, nynorsk pioneer – 1963
