= Gisle Handeland =

Norwegian politician

Gisle Handeland (born 1943) is a Norwegian politician for the Labour Party.

From 1990 to 1995, during the third cabinet Brundtland, Handeland was private secretary (today known as political advisor) / state secretary in the Ministry of Transport and Communications.

In 1999 Handeland was elected county mayor (fylkesordfører) of Hordaland, as the first from the Labour Party to hold this position. He lost the position in 2003, but remained a member of the county council. He is also a member of the board of the Western Norway Regional Health Authority.

He hails from Fedje Municipality.

Political offices
| Preceded by Magnar Lussand | County mayor of Hordaland; 1999–2003 | Succeeded by Torill Selsvold Nyborg |
