= Kåre Harila =

Norwegian politician

Kåre Harila (born 25 November 1935) is a Norwegian politician for the Christian Democratic Party.

During the cabinet Syse, Harila was appointed State Secretary in the Ministry of Transport and Communications. He later served as a deputy representative to the Norwegian Parliament from Finnmark during the term 1997–2001.

On the local level he had been a member of Finnmark county council from 1979 to 1983 and 1987 to 1991. He hailed from Vadsø.
