= Arne Bøyum =

Norwegian hematologist

Arne Bøyum (4 April 1928 – 3 December 2018) was a Norwegian radiation biologist and hematologist.

He grew up in Voss and then his family moved to Sandane in 1938 when his father became headmaster of Firda Landsgymnas. At the same school, Bøyum finished his secondary education in 1947. He graduated with the cand.med. degree from the University of Bergen in 1954. After a few years working as a physician, he became a research fellow at Rikshospitalet and later took the dr.med. degree in 1968.

He spent the better part of his scientific career at the Norwegian Defence Research Establishment, from 1961. After reaching the ordinary retirement age he was a researcher at the University of Oslo Institute of Basic Medical Sciences. He was inducted into the Norwegian Academy of Science and Letters in 1995.

First and foremost, Bøyum became known as Norway's most cited researcher of all time. His article on separating white blood cells from 1968 was cited more than 14,000 times during the first four decades. After joining the radiation biology group at the Defence Research Establishment, he did experimental studies on bone marrow and blood cells. With the aim of augmenting defense and medicine against ABC weapons such as radiation damage, this is also relevant in cancer therapy. Bøyum's research was also relevant for HIV and AIDS. In his later career, he studied physical stress and the immune system.

He died at the age of 90. Hobbies included mountaineering, musical instruments and bridge.
