= Dalia Raudonikytė With =

Lithuanian composer (1970–2018)

Dalia Raudonikytė (21 May 1970 – 7 September 2018) was a Lithuanian composer and pianist born in Vilnius, Lithuania. She was profiled in the Lithuanian Music Encyclopedia, Muzikos Enciklopedija, in 2007. Her compositions ranged from electronic to orchestral and she was known to use literary references in her lyrics, quoting authors such as Thomas Wolfe, Picabia, Virginia Woolf, and Stefan Zweig in her works. She died on 7 September 2018 after a protracted fight with cancer.

== Biography ==
Dalia Raudonikytė was born in 1970 in Vilnius, Lithuania to the painter Danguolė Raudonikienė. Dalia studied Music Theory from 1986 to 1990 at the Juozo Tallat-Kelpsos Conservatory in Vilnius. She continued her studies at the Lithuanian Academy of Music and Theatre with Bronius Kutavičius and Osvaldas Balakauskas, where she received a Master of Music degree in 1996 in both composition and piano pedagogy. After she received an award from The Research Council of Norway, Raudonikytė, she moved to Norway to continue her studies as a research fellow in composition and electro-acoustic music with Lasse Thoresen at the Norwegian Academy of Music (1998–2000). In 1997, she became a member of the Lithuanian Composers Union and was accepted as a member of the Norwegian Society of Composers in 2003. She was profiled in the Lithuanian Music Encyclopedia Muzikos Enciklopedija (2007), the Encyclopedia of Lithuanian Composers – Lietuviu kompozitoriai (2004) and Lietuva IV (2015).

== Composition ==
Dalia Raudonikytė explored a wide variety of media and styles in her electronic, instrumental, vocal and orchestral compositions. Major works include Grues et Nix for string orchestra (1996), Spalvos for symphony orchestra (1995), Missa brevis for choir and organ (1993), as well as works for organ, choir, chamber, and vocal music, and electroacoustic music. Her compositions have been performed at the international contemporary music festivals "Jauna muzika" (1992, 1996, 1998), "Druskininkai" (1994, 1995), "Atžalynas" (1996), "Festspillene i Bergen" (2001), Oslo International Church Music Festival (2001) in Norway, "Gaida", "Is arti" and "Muzikos ruduo" in Lithuania, "Floralia muzyczne" in Poland, the "MATA Festival", "New York Film Festival", "Another Experiment by Women", and the "New York Electronic Art Festival" in the United States.

Collaborations with visual artists Lili White and Ewa Jacobson resulted in multi-media sound and visual installations in Lithuania and the United States.

Commissions from instrumentalists specializing in new music such as the Norwegian saxophonist Rolf Erik Nystrøm and the American guitarist Daniel Lippel resulted in works for solo instruments that utilized extended techniques such as vocalizing and playing the saxophone simultaneously (e.g. 'Everything Passes'). Works for both of these performing artists appear on Raudonikytė With's solo CD Solitarius, released on New Focus Recordings in 2017. Solitarius was reviewed in the Lithuanian weekly newspaper «7 Days of Art» and was awarded "Best of Bandcamp Contemporary Classical" by Bandcamp in September 2017.

== Major works ==
=== Electronic ===
- Ventus (2002) for alto saxophone and electro-acoustic sound
- In Brevi (2011) audio-visual installation, collaboration with visual artist Ewa Jacobsson.
- Vernissage (2012) sound installation for art exhibition
- Sister of Wisdom (2016) for voice, electronics 5.1 and 2017 video by Lili White – liliwhite.com
- She and Her Four Shadows (2018) mono-drama for voice and electronics

=== Chamber: Vocal ===
- Missa brevis (1993) for choir and organ
- Non nova, sed nove (2011) for voice and viola
- Mes ir jura (2013) for mezzo-soprano, violin, piano and electronics
- You Enlightened Me (2014) mystery for voice and piano

=== Chamber: Instrumental ===
- The circle of time (1994) for clarinet and piano
- Multimodis (2002) for violin and organ
- FCH (2007) for piano solo
- Idem non semper idem (2009) for alto saxophone solo
- Astra (2012) for violin solo
- Sviflo (2015) for flute and piano
- Ad luce (2015) for piano solo
- De die in diem (2016) for two flutes and two pianos
- Everything Passes (2016) for alto saxophone solo
- Solitarius (2017) for clarinet solo
- Primo cum lumine solis (2017) for guitar solo

=== Orchestral ===
- Spalvos for symphony orchestra (1995)
- Colors (1996) for symphony orchestra
- Grues et Nix (1996) for string orchestra

== Discography ==
- Solitarius (July 2017) New Focus Recordings Catalog Number: fcr186
