= Geir Magnus Nyborg =

Norwegian media scholar and theologian (1951–2018)

- Born: February 15, 1951; Askøy Municipality, Norway
- Died: February 13, 2018 (aged 66); Bergen Municipality, Norway
- Occupation: Media scholar

Geir Magnus Nyborg (February 15, 1951 – February 13, 2018) was a Norwegian media scholar and theologian.

Born in Askøy Municipality, Norway, Nyborg headed the Familie & Medier Christian organization from 2001 to 2009, and after that headed the training and competence center at Gimlekollen NLA College. He worked in various mass media in Norway and Latin America in production, management, and teaching. He provided the initiative for and was the first editor for the radio station Kystradioen and was also the first editor at the newspaper VestNytt. Nyborg also held several important executive positions, including chairman of the board at the Strømme Foundation (2004–2010) and the radio station P7 Kristen Riksradio (1985–2010), and he was vice-president of the Fellowship of European Broadcasters.

Nyborg received his professional degree (embedseksamen) in theology from the MF Norwegian School of Theology in 1975, his master's degree in communication from Wheaton College in 1982, and his doctorate from the University of Bergen in 1995. His dissertation was titled Conquest, Dominance or Spiritual Reformation? Bolivian Quechua Families Watch US Televangelism.

Nyborg was married to the Christian Democratic Party politician Torill Selsvold Nyborg. He died in Bergen Municipality on February 13, 2018.
