= Kåre Venn =

Kåre Olav Venn (29 December 1935 – 6 April 2024) was a Norwegian forest pathologist.

He was born in Orkdal Municipality, and started studying at the State Forestry School in Steinkjer (later a part of Nord-Trøndelag University College). After graduating as a forester from the Norwegian College of Agriculture, he took the dr.agric. degree at the same institution in 1984.

He spent his entire career at the Norwegian College of Agriculture, but was also a guest scholar at the University of Wisconsin, the Canadian Pacific Forestry Centre and the Sokoine University of Agriculture.

He was also a council member of the Rådet for skogbruksforskning and NLVF. His research interests included both pathological damage to forests, chemical damage as well as physical phenomena such as lightning strikes and vehicle-related damage. Registering damage was an important part of his work, with Venn chairing the Monitoring Programme for Forest Damage.

He was awarded the King's Medal of Merit in gold in 2003 and was inducted into the Norwegian Academy of Science and Letters in 1991.

He resided in Ås Municipality. He died in 2024, aged 88.
