= Solveig Laila Thoresen =

Norwegian politician (1931–2018)

Solveig Laila Thoresen (2 January 1931 – 20 June 2018) was a Norwegian politician for the Christian Democratic Party.

She served as a deputy representative to the Parliament of Norway from Sør-Trøndelag during the terms 1977–1981 and 1981–1985. In total she met during 119 days of parliamentary session.
