= Chul Ho Lee =

South Korean entrepreneur in Norway (1937–2018)

- Lee in 2010
- Born: 23 February 1937; Cheonan, Chūseinan Prefecture, Korea, Empire of Japan
- Died: 16 February 2018 (aged 80); Oslo, Norway
- Occupations: Chef, entrepreneur
- Known for: Mr. Lee instant noodle brand
- Awards: King's Medal of Merit

Korean name
- Hangul: 이철호
- RR: I Cheolho
- MR: I Ch'ŏrho

Chul Ho Lee (Korean: 이철호; 23 February 1937 – 16 February 2018) was a South Korean entrepreneur and chef who was famous in Norway for producing the Mr. Lee brand of instant noodles; the name of which he was also known by. He was also sometimes nicknamed "Noodle King".

== Biography ==
Lee was born in 1937 in Cheonan, Chūseinan Prefecture, Korea, Empire of Japan. In 1951, during the 1950–1953 Korean War, Lee became separated from his family while fleeing the war. After failing to cross a river, he was rescued by some American soldiers. He spoke some English and served as an interpreter for them; he was dubbed "Archie" by the soldiers, after titular character in Archie Comics. He worked as a houseboy on military bases, performing tasks for the soldiers. Later, he was severely injured in a grenade attack and ended up in a Norwegian field hospital (NORMASH). Doctors there arranged for him to be evacuated from Korea and treated in Norway. He had a long recovery period in the Sunnaas rehabilitation center in Nesodden. He then acquired permanent residency status in Norway.

In Norway, Lee was young, poor, and alone. He worked as a paper boy and shoe shiner and emptied outdoor toilets. He was often hungry, and even ate pig feed. He eventually began attending secondary school and became a professional cook. He received some training in Switzerland. He worked in a number of restaurants, and eventually became a top executive of the Møllhausen restaurant chain in Oslo. He was laid off in 1989, when the chain was acquired by a competitor. He began working in the mutual trade of products between Norway and South Korea. He traded Korean ginseng products and also turned towards bringing instant cup noodles to Norway. His noodles went on to, at some point, have around 80% of the local instant noodle market.

The cup noodles he brought to Norway were branded as Mr. Lee. Lee embarked on an advertising campaign for the noodles, during which he appeared on TV a number of times in the 1990s. This turned him into a local celebrity. In 2004, he received the King's Medal of Merit from Norway's King Harald V for his work with war veterans.

Lee was active in the South Korean expatriate community in Norway, and a member of the Norwegian Korean War veterans' association, where he was affectionately called "Archie". He supported a number of charities and spoke at universities before his death.

He died on 16 February 2018 in Oslo, after a having lived with Parkinson's disease for a number of years.

== Personal life ==
His German-born wife Anneliese died of cancer in 1984. He had three daughters with her, Anja (a doctor by 2018), Sonja (a chef), and Irina (a journalist). Lee remarried a Korean woman named Hae Jong afterwards.

He wrote a book entitled Be Happy (2001), and his daughter wrote a biography of him called Det Sa Min Far (2010).
