= Jofrid Wiik =

Norwegian theologian and politician

Jofrid Wiik, née Bjorland (7 December 1934 – 12 May 2018) was a Norwegian theologian and politician for the Christian Democratic Party.

Hailing from Nærbø, she graduated with the cand.theol. degree from the MF Norwegian School of Theology in 1963. After working at mission and bible schools she was a faculty member at the MF Norwegian School of Theology from 1975 to 1995. She served as a deputy representative to the Parliament of Norway from Rogaland during the term 1969–1973. She met during 7 days of parliamentary session.
