= Jørgen Dobloug =

Norwegian artist (1945–2018)

- Born: 23 April 1945; Oslo, Norway
- Died: 16 January 2018 (aged 72); Oslo, Norway
- Resting place: Lillehammer, Norway
- Education: Examen Artium (1965, Oslo, Norway), University entrance exam in philosophy (1966, Oslo, Norway), "Sociology and history of art" – University of Oslo (1966-1969, Oslo, Norway), "Graphics course" (Class Armin Hofmann) – Allgemeine Gewerbeschule Basel (1969, Basel, Switzerland), Statens håndverk og kunstindustriskole (1970-1971, Oslo, Norway), Staatliche Kunstakademie Düsseldorf (1971-1984, Düsseldorf) Germany: "Fine Art" (1971-1972, Prof. Joseph Beuys), "Art Pedagogy" (1972-1973, Prof. Joseph Beuys), "Art Pedagogy" (1973-1974, former Beuys class), "Fine Art" (1974-1977, former Beuys class), nominated master student by Prof. Joseph Beuys (1974), officially confirmed as master student by the academy Commission (1975), scholarship for Cité internationale des Arts (1976, Paris, France), "Art Pedagogy" (1977-1981, Daniel Hees), "Art Pedagogy" (1981-1982, no specific class), "Graphic Design/Pedagogy" (1982-1984, Prof. Franz Eggenschwiler)
- Children: Tim Simon Tilgner
- Elected: Tutor of the former Beuys class, member of the student parliament and delegate to the Senate, the highest-ranking organ of the academy (1973)
- Website: http://www.jorgendobloug.no

Jørgen Dobloug (23 April 1945 – 16 January 2018) was a Norwegian artist based in Düsseldorf and Oslo.

He studied at the Allgemeine Gewerbeschule Basel, Switzerland (1969) in the class of Armin Hofmann and Staatliche Kunstakademie Düsseldorf, Germany (1971 – 84), in the classes of Professor Joseph Beuys, Daniel Hees and Franz Eggenschwiler. Dobloug is an important Norwegian artist, who left Norway and what be believed to be a rigid educational system for performing arts, to find his own way. Dobloug’s works have been shown in a large number of exhibitions, in Norway and abroad.

His works are mainly acrylic paintings displaying either abstract motifs or heads/faces. They are humorous, partly with contradictory elements in respect of both motif, composition and colours. The works span from strict geometric paintings including grid-patterns, to playful paintings executed with a rough, almost expressive, brush. There is furthermore conceptual side to Dobloug’s project.

His works are part of international art collections as Nasjonalmuseet, Museum Kunstpalast, Henie-Onstad Kunstsenter, Lillehammer Kunstmuseum, Svensk Konstfond, Tangen-Samlingen, Telenor Art Collection, Storebrand Art Collection, Christian Bjellands kunstsamling or the art collection of NSB.

Dobloug was granted the Norwegian Government Grant for Artists from 1995.

== Bibliography ==
- Tim Simon Tilgner: Jørgen Dobloug | Oslo — Basel — Düsseldorf (the early years I) 1962—1970, vca° — an extended concept of work 2017, ISBN 978-3-00-055323-3
- Norsk kunstnerleksikon Bind 1 A-G p. 492, Universitetsforlaget 1982. ISBN 82-00-05689-9
- "Brennpunkt Düsseldorf 1962-1987", Kunstmuseum Düsseldorf 1987. Utstillingskatalog
- Øysten Ustvedt: Ny norsk kunst etter 1990 p. 75-77, Faktabokforlaget 2001. ISBN 978-82-450-1016-9
- Johannes Rød og Arnt Fredheim: Malerier p. 217, Gyldendal Norsk Forlag 2004. ISBN 82-05-30957-4
