= The Wanderer (criminal) =

Norwegian burglar

Terje Larsen (22 August 1958 – 10 May 2018), known as "The Wanderer" (Norwegian: Vandreren), was a Norwegian convicted serial burglar. Convicted of 664 burglaries, but suspected of carrying out several thousand, he has been described as a legend in Norwegian criminal history. Since the beginning of the 1980s, Larsen wandered throughout the country, burgling hundreds of cabins and lodges, often spending several nights in the process, all the while avoiding law enforcement. He was named one of Norway's most notorious criminals.

== Early life ==
Larsen was born on 22 August 1958, in a Gypsy family in Sandviken, a neighborhood in Bergen, and had four siblings. Old acquaintances described the family as being very interested in recreational activities, spending a lot of time outdoors. The children learned early to survive in the mountains. They could hunt, fish, and make "anything with their hands." And they learned to hike and trek through the forests.

In addition to outdoor activities, Larsen had a great passion for football, and was once expected to become a professional footballer. He played as a winger with IL Sandviken. After school, he went to Copenhagen and joined the Danish club Fremad Amager, but soon dropped out and started living on the streets.

== Criminal life ==
After returning to Bergen from Copenhagen in the late 1970s, he found himself homeless and jobless. He soon started breaking into multiple cabins, receiving his first criminal conviction in 1979. He continued burgling however, first in the vicinity around Bergen, before moving to Voss and Hardanger. Here he would raid the area and gather large depots of stolen goods. On 20 July 1989, he left Bergen with his cousin and friend Svend Dahle, and moved to eastern Norway. One year later, on 3 August 1990, the two were raiding a cottage in Tolga Municipality in Østerdalen when, both drunk after having raided the cottage's alcohol store, they started fighting. Larsen left the cottage, and when he came back he found the cottage burned down and Dahle dead inside it. Larsen was charged and convicted of involuntary manslaughter, but was later released on parole.

After receiving thirteen convictions throughout the 1990s for over 450 burglaries, he was arrested again in October 2000 and charged with 221 new counts of burglary, and was subsequently sentenced to three years in prison. One year later, in late April 2001, he escaped from prison while on temporary parole. After slipping away into the forest, he immediately embarked upon a massive burglary-spree. During the next four months, Larsen robbed 60 cabins in Ringsaker Municipality, over 50 cabins in Stor-Elvdal Municipality, 25 cabins in Alvdal Municipality and Folldal Municipality, as well as over 30 cabins on around Dovre Municipality. By mid-August, the search for Larsen had turned into a large manhunt, involving the police, hunters, cabin owners and local volunteers, all scouring the forests and wilderness and conducting 24-hour patrols of popular hiking areas, searching for any trace of the notorious criminal.

On 19 August, after receiving dozens of reports of forced entries, Norwegian police started plotting Larsen's itinerary on the map. Police detectives read the terrain and calculated Larsen's likely next step. They then arranged for police units to stay one step ahead of him. The plan worked, and they managed to track Larsen down when a police patrol found him walking on the mountainous border between Lom Municipality and Skjåk Municipality. He was handcuffed and escorted under heavy guard a few kilometers through the steep and difficult terrain to the nearest road, before being transported back to prison in Hønefoss. On 23 August 2005, Larsen was again released on probation, but once again he disappeared into the woods. Almost immediately after, police were flooded with reports about break-ins in lodges and cottages throughout Buskerud county. After receiving a tip-off, Larsen was apprehended on 10 October. He confessed to having burgled 70 cabins in Sigdal Municipality, Modum Municipality, Øvre Eiker Municipality, and Ringerike Municipality. He was sentenced to a further 2 years and 6 months in February the next year.

Larsen was subsequently incarcerated in Ringerike Prison. In 2007, he was brutally assaulted by a fellow inmate after an altercation, causing him to suffer a cerebral hemorrhage, requiring life-saving surgery.

== Hiatus and return to crime ==
After being released from prison some time after 2008, he spent some time at a psychiatric hospital, being treated for anxiety and depression. Larsen spent many years out of the public eye, without committing serious offenses. On 23 July 2013 however, when the Kirkvoll family entered their mountain lodge at Geilo they found it broken into and vandalized. They also found Larsen heavily intoxicated sleeping in one of the bedrooms. When they confronted him, he introduced himself before running out and disappearing into the nearby woods. On 31 July, he was arrested outside Geilo, and subsequently confessed to seven additional break-ins.

== Modus operandi ==
Although convicted 14 times of 664 separate break-ins, he is suspected of carrying out thousands. This is due to his modus operandi remaining unchanged throughout the years. After breaking into an unoccupied cabin or lodge, Larsen would typically live there for several nights, drinking all of the alcohol he could find (Larsen was a long-time alcoholic, and was a recovering drug-addict) as well as eating all of the food.

Owners have also described scenes of vomit and urine, while leaving a "signature" of excrement on the living room floor was considered Larsen's trademark. He also typically stole outdoors-equipment such as sleeping bags and clothing, which he needed for wandering the wilderness.
