= Jens Kristian Thune =

Norwegian jurist (1935–2018)

- Born: 30 July 1935; Oslo, Norway
- Died: 24 June 2018 (aged 82)
- Occupations: jurist and businessperson

Jens Kristian Thune (30 July 1935 – 24 June 2018) was a Norwegian jurist and businessperson. He was born in Oslo.

Thune practiced as lawyer in Oslo from 1966. He has been chairman of the board of the newspaper Dagbladet, of the National Gallery, of the radio channel P4, and of Anti-Doping Norway. He is also known for chasing and revealing the hidden fortune of ship owner Hilmar Reksten.

His books include Jakten. På sporet av Hilmar Reksten from 1991, and Med et skrik from 1996, about the theft of Munch's iconic painting The Scream from the National Gallery in 1994.
