= 2017 in Norway =

- Centuries: 19th; 20th; 21st
- Decades: 1990s; 2000s; 2010s; 2020s
- See also: List of years in Norway

Events in the year 2017 in Norway.

== Incumbents ==
- Monarch – Harald V.
- Prime Minister – Erna Solberg (Conservative).

== Events ==
- 1 January
  - The Church of Norway was partially disestablished and demoted from state church to national church.
  - The number of municipalities in Norway decreased from 428 to 426 as Andebu Municipality and Stokke Municipality were incorporated into the neighboring Sandefjord Municipality.
- 11 January – Norway starts a complete switch-off of national FM radio stations.
- 11 September – the 2017 Norwegian parliamentary election.

== Popular culture ==
=== Music ===
- 28 January – Presentation of the Spellemannprisen awards
- 11 March – Selection of the contributor of Norway in the Eurovision Song Contest 2017

=== Sports ===
- 13–15 January – The 2017 Norwegian Figure Skating Championships were held at Hamar.
- 26 March – Ketil Tømmernes was elected new president of the Norwegian Athletics Association
- 27 March – the announcement that Inge Andersen was sacked as secretary-general of the Norwegian Confederation of Sports, having served since 2004

=== Film ===
- 15–21 January – Tromsø International Film Festival 2017. Films shown at the festival included Tungeskjærerne, Christine, Neruda, Nowhere To Hide, Fluefangeren, Ishavsblod and La La Land.

=== Television ===
- Last season of the television series Skam (2015–2017). The series attracted international attention, and the concept has been sold to several countries.

== Anniversaries ==
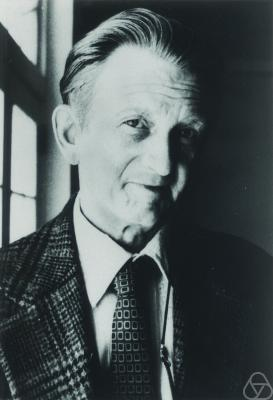
Atle Selberg

- 2 May – 25 years since the EEA Agreement was signed
- 15 May – 150 years since the birth of polar explorer Hjalmar Johansen.
- 6 June – 25 years since Fantoft Stave Church was destroyed by arson, sparking a wave of church arsons
- 14 June – 100 years since the birth of mathematician Atle Selberg.
- 15 June – 100 years since the death of physicist Kristian Birkeland.
- 4 August – 150 years since the birth of linguist Olaf Broch, a pioneer researcher of Slavic dialects.
- 8 August – 200 years since the birth of social researcher Eilert Sundt.
- 14 October – 200 years since the birth of suffragist Marcus Thrane.
- 13 December – 150 years since the birth of Kristian Birkeland.

== Notable deaths ==
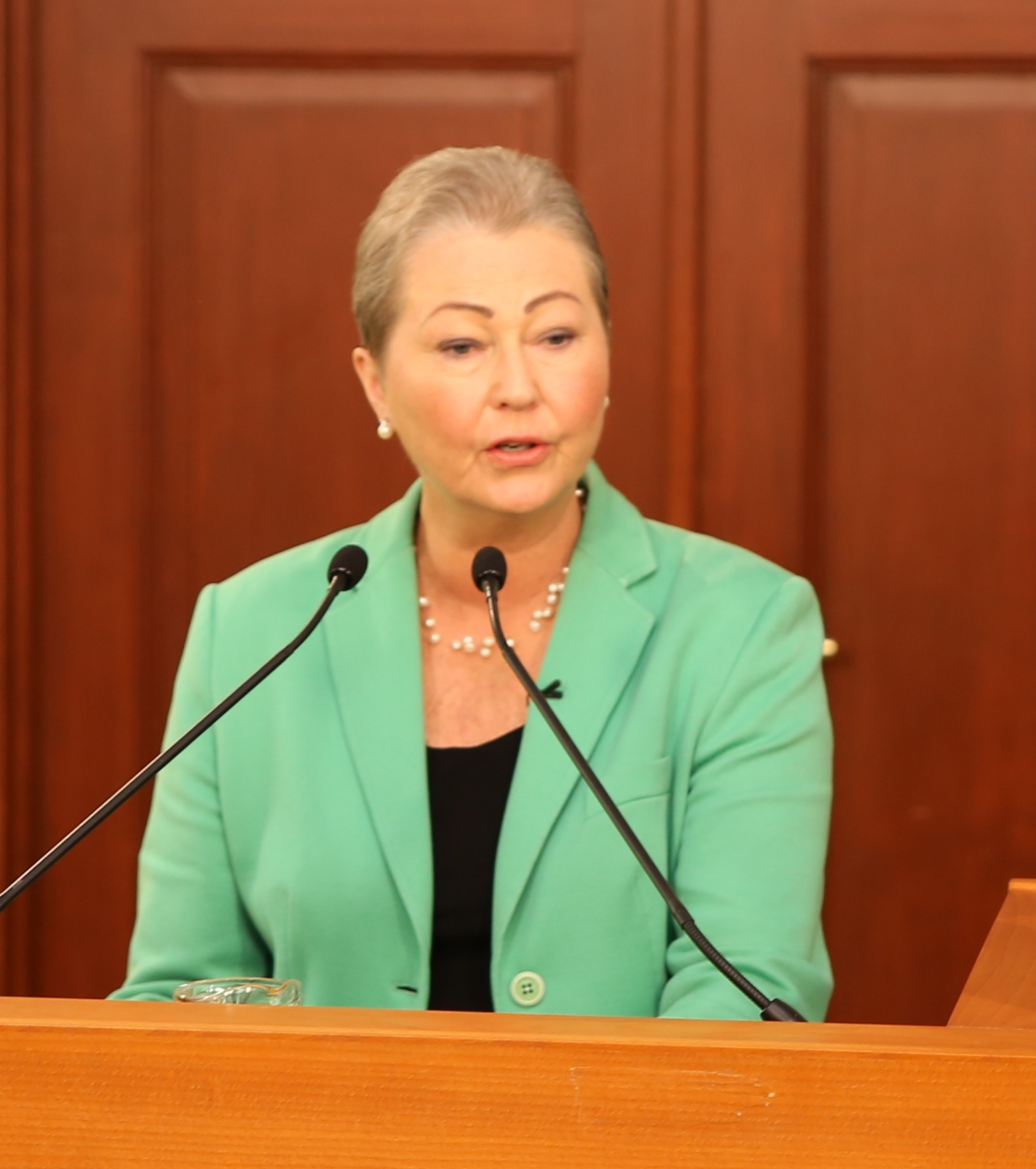
Kaci Kullmann Five in 2016

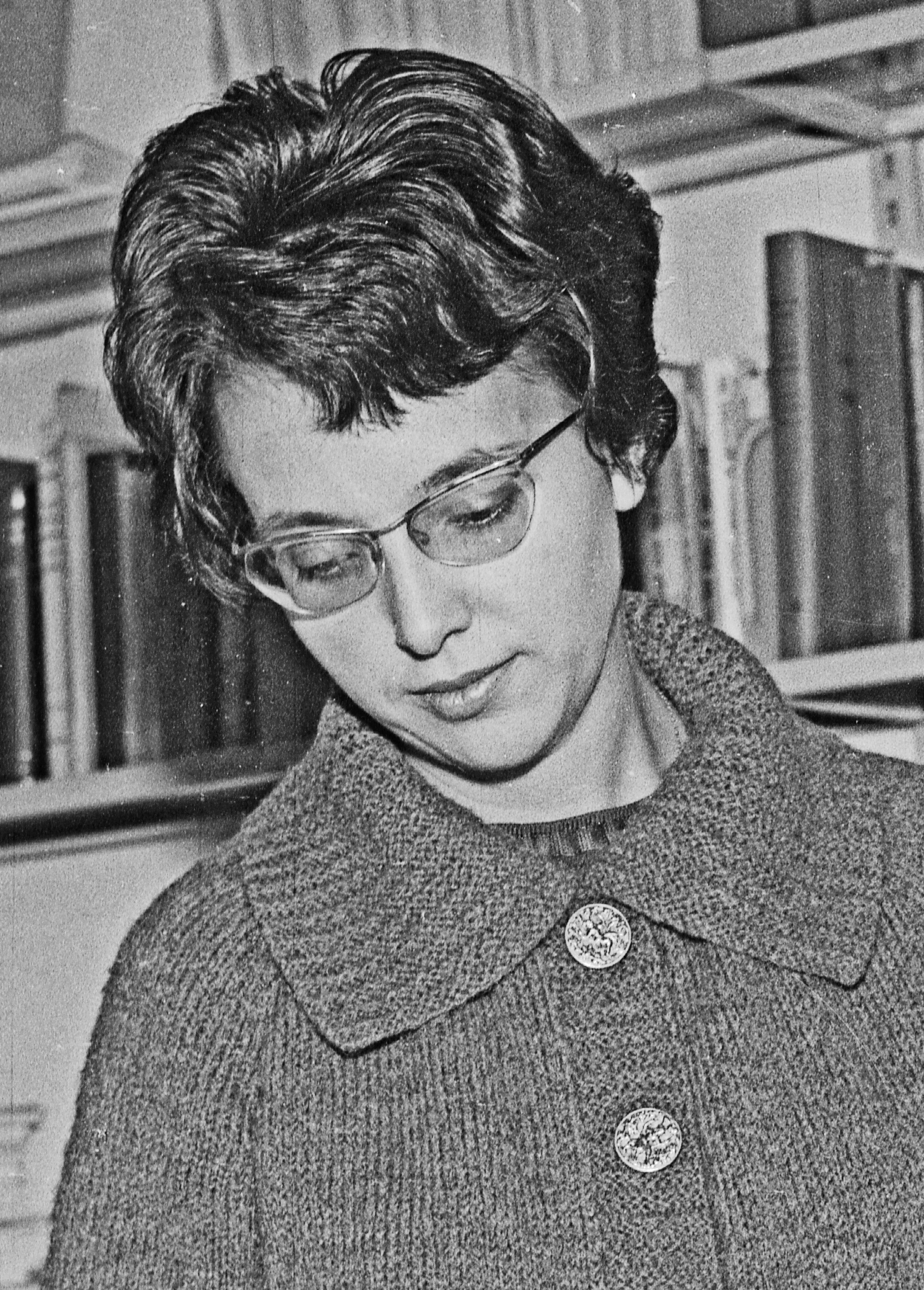
Jacqueline Naze Tjøtta in 1966

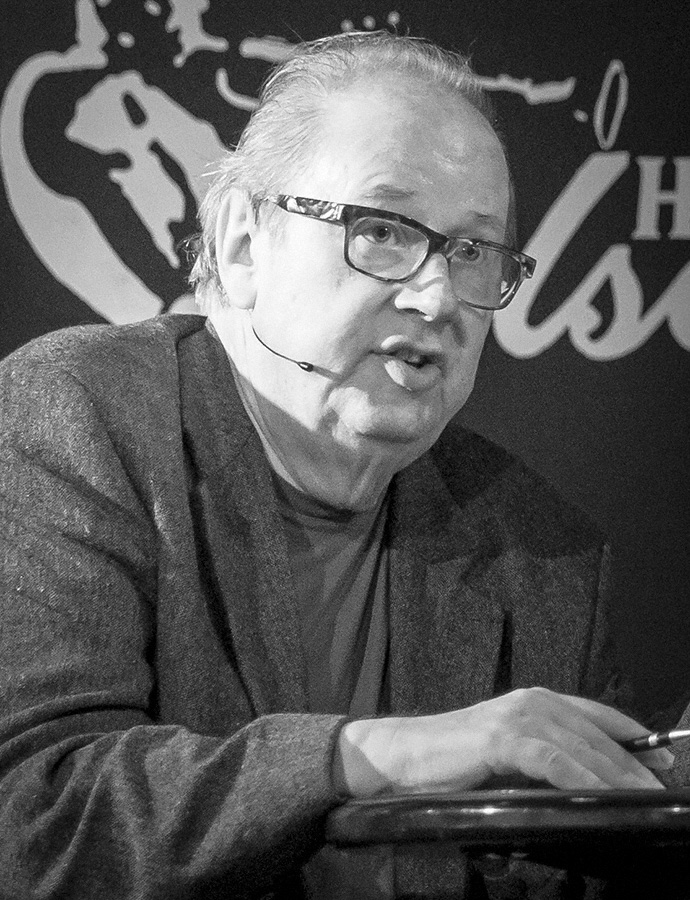
Knut Borge in 2016

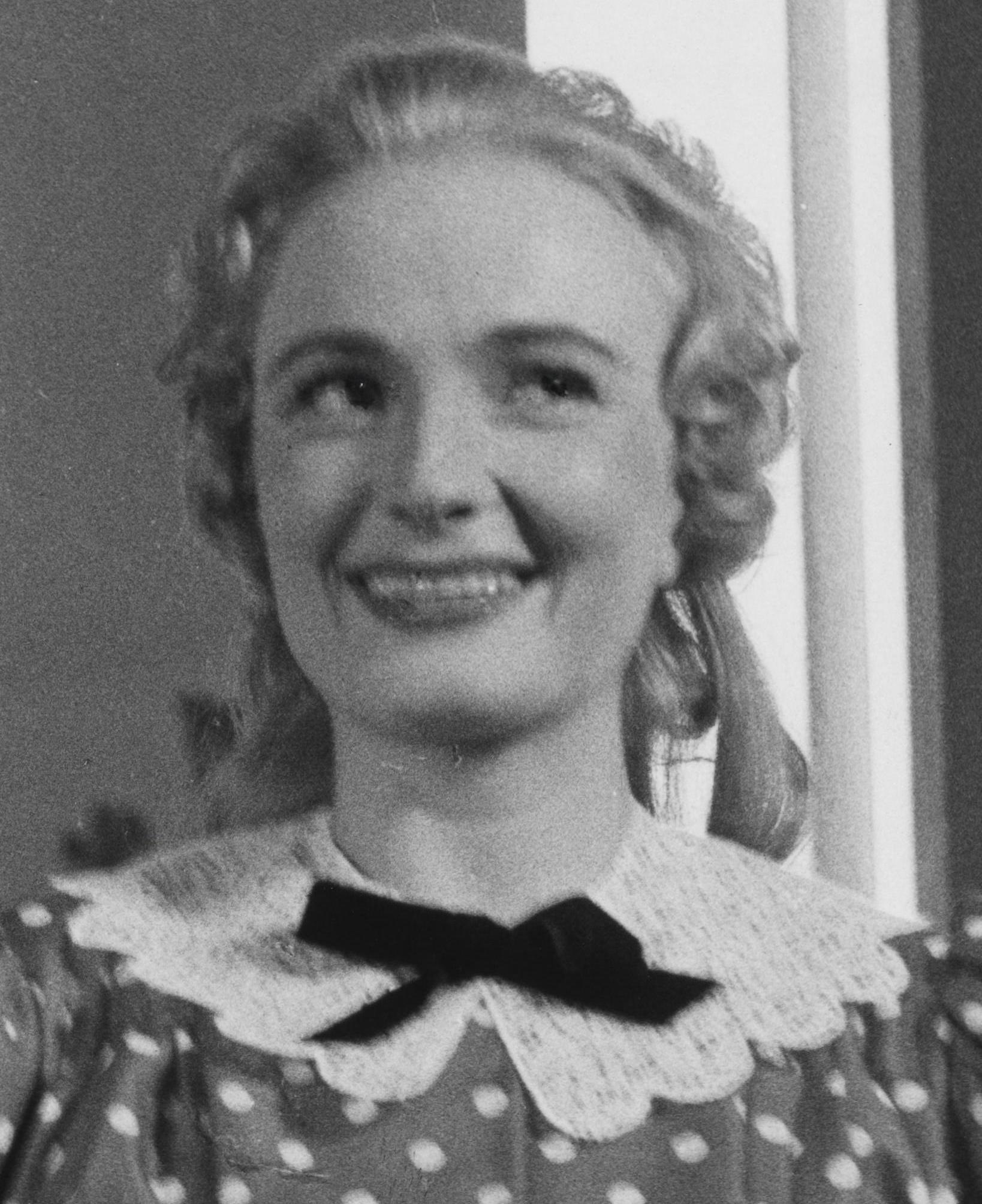
Bab Christensen in 1955 or 1956

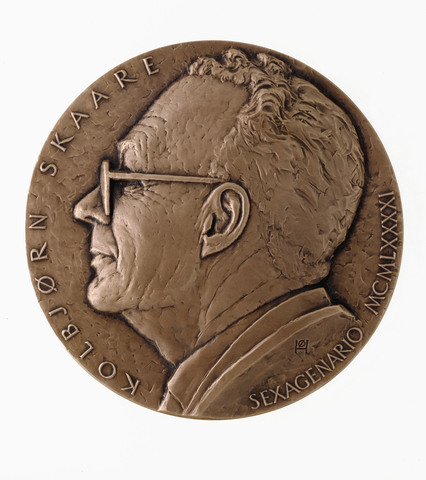
Memorial medal with Kolbjørn Skaare

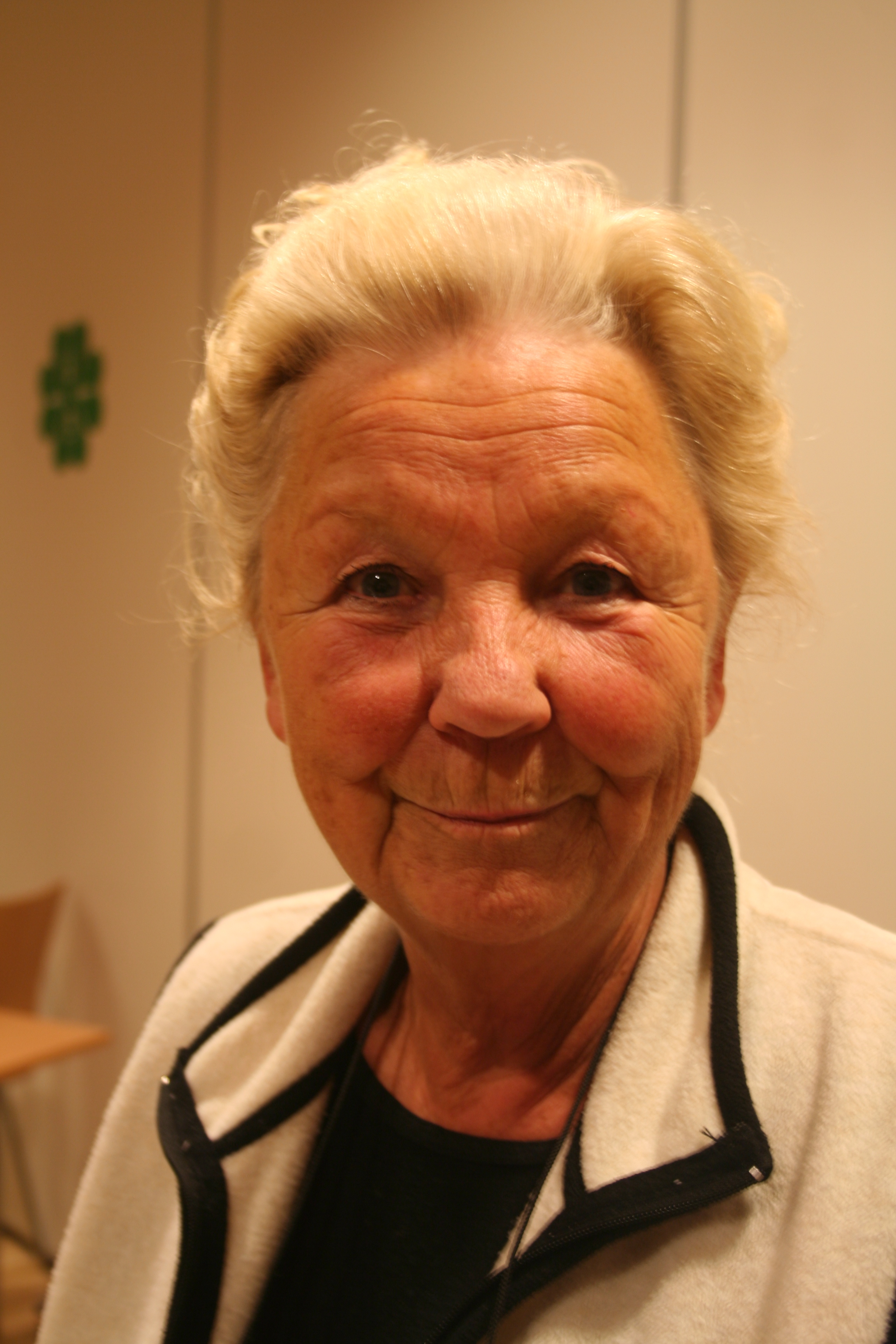
Ragnhild Queseth Haarstad

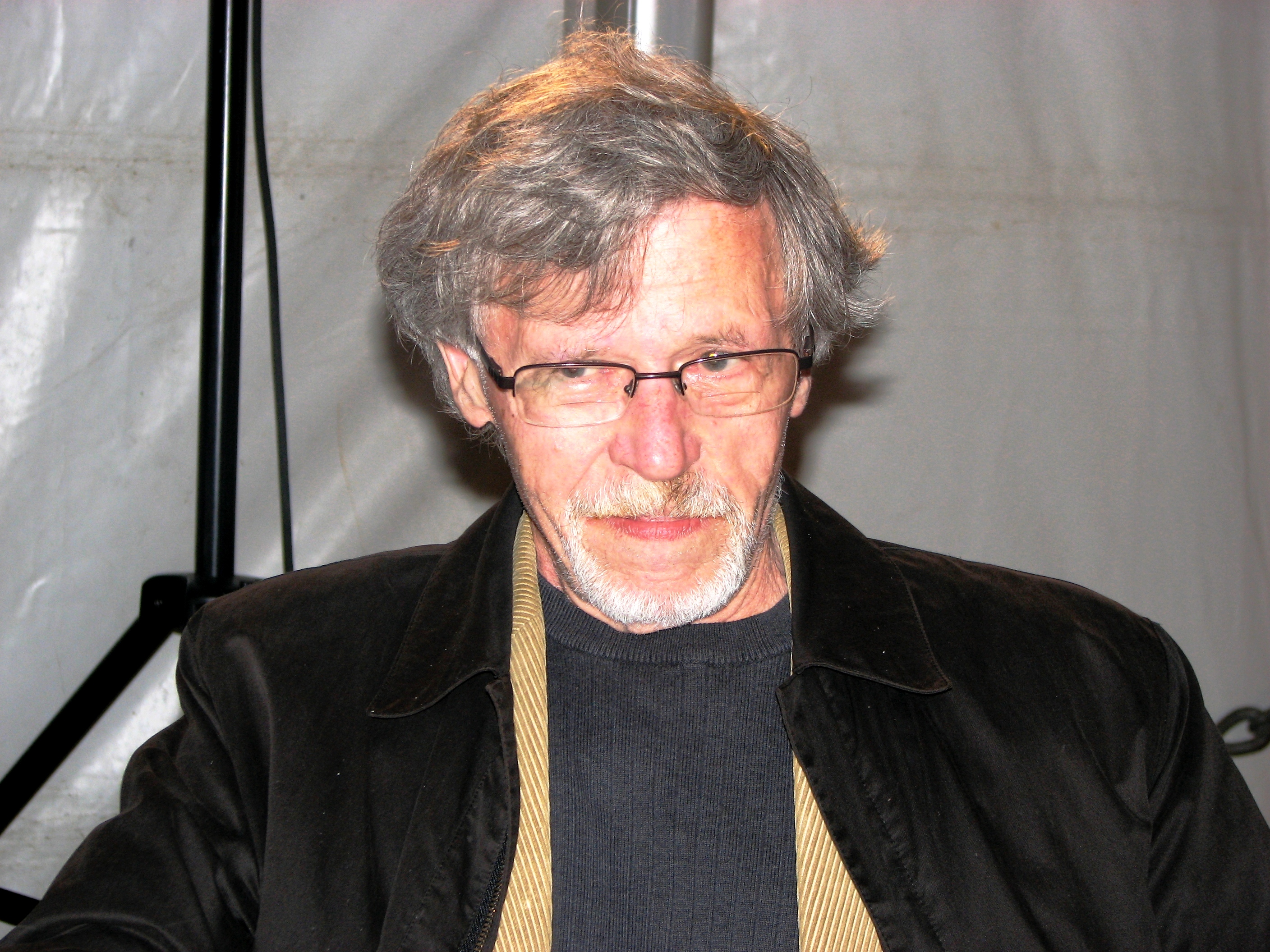
Fredrik Skagen in 2010

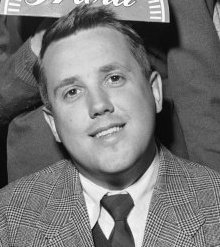
Egil Monn-Iversen in 1957

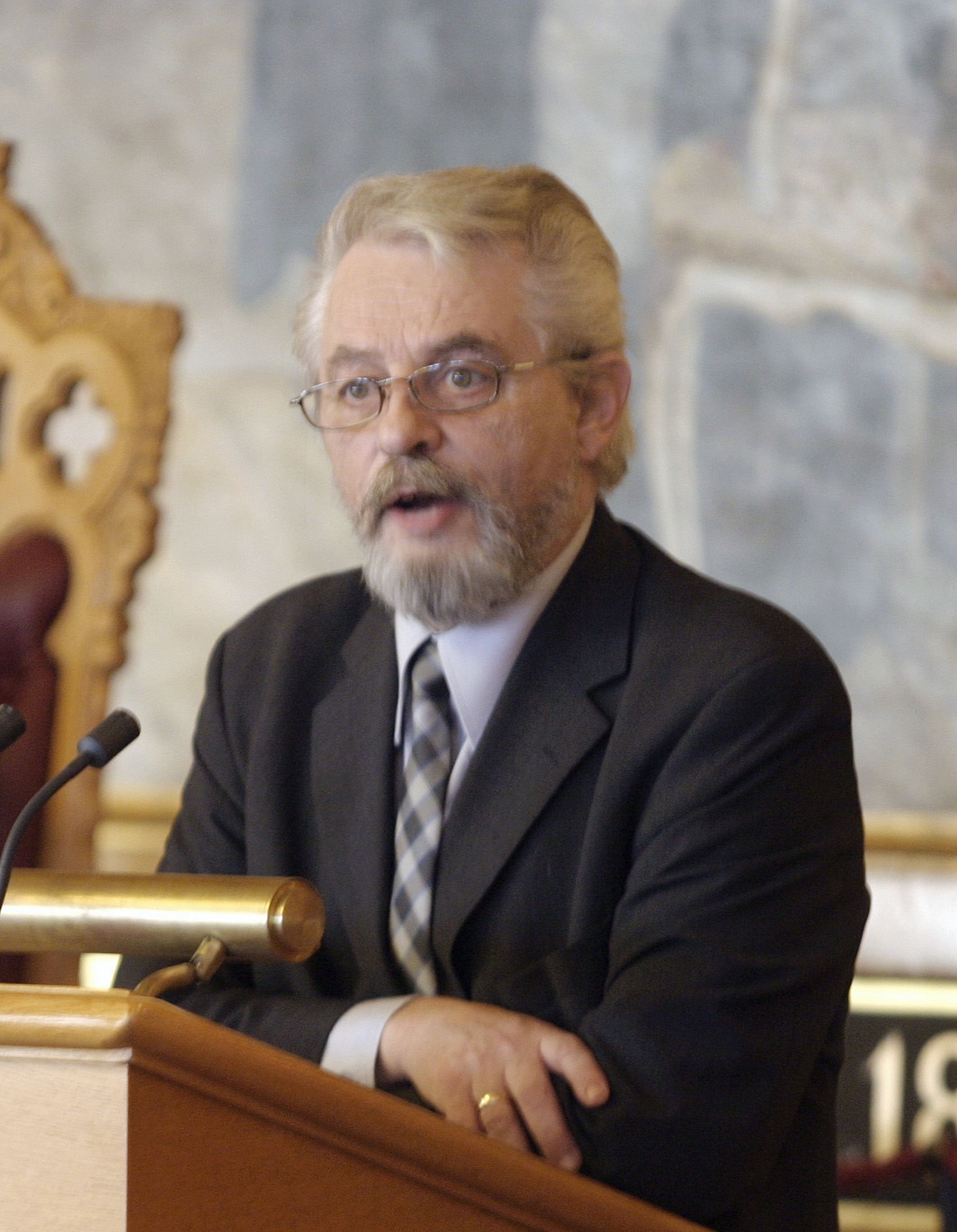
Jørgen Kosmo in 2003

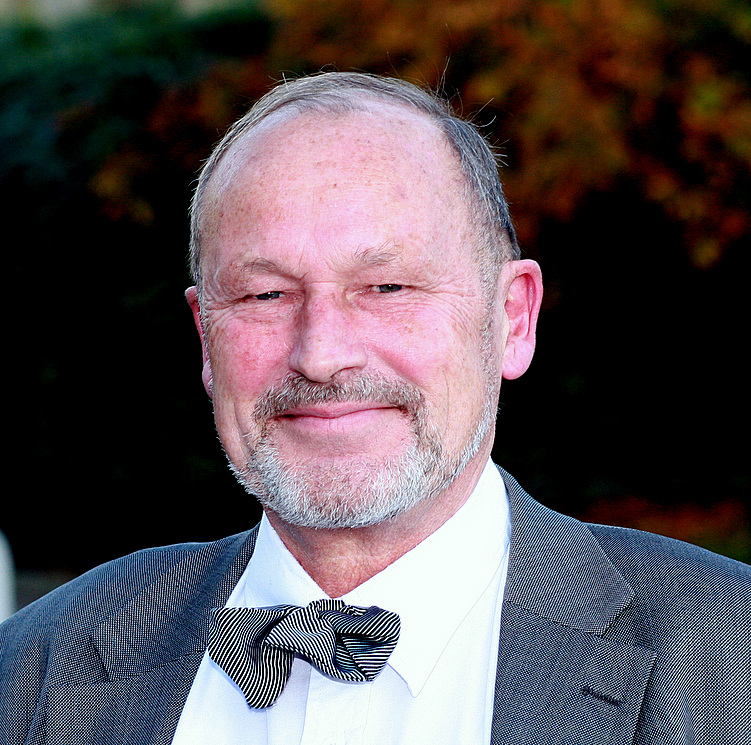
Per Fugelli in 2008

- 6 January – Ivar A. Mjør, odontologist (b. 1933).
- 7 January – Einfrid Perstølen, psychiatrist and language proponent (b. 1917).
- 7 January – Stein Gauslaa, newspaper editor (b. 1948).
- 8 January – Svennik Høyer, political scientist (b. 1931).
- 9 January – Jens Christian Magnus, officer and politician (b. 1920).
- 10 January – Oddvar Barlie, sports wrestler (b. 1929).
- 18 January – Bjarne Grevsgard, radio executive (b. 1948).
- 18 January – Gullow Gjeseth, Army officer (b. 1937).
- 18 January – Ståle Wikshåland, musicologist (b. 1953).
- 21 January – Carl-Fredrik Michelet Tidemann, army physician (b. 1932).
- 22 January – Merete Armand, actress (b. 1955).
- 22 January – Lisbeth Korsmo, speed skater (b. 1948).
- 25 January – Arne Asper, businessperson (b. 1923).
- 27 January – Wanda Hjort Heger, social worker (b. 1921).
- 29 January – Willy Fossli, footballer (b. 1931).
- 29 January – Olav Smidsrød, biochemist (b. 1936).
- 1 February – Oskar A. Munch, businessperson (b. 1928).
- 7 February – Gunnar Løvhøiden, physicist (b. 1939).
- 8 February – Kjell Heggelund, literary researcher, poet and translator (b. 1932).
- 11 February – Knut Kleve, philologist (b. 1926).
- 11 February – Eivind Hjelmtveit, cultural administrator (b. 1926).
- 12 February – Åsleik Engmark, comedian (b. 1965).
- 13 February – Odd Tandberg, painter (b. 1924).
- 14 February – Anne Aaserud, art historian (b. 1942).
- 14 February – Gunnar Edvard Gundersen, politician (b. 1927).
- 16 February – Terje Dahl, jockey (b. 1935).
- 17 February – Just Faaland, economist (b. 1922).
- 19 February – Kaci Kullmann Five, politician (b. 1951).
- 22 February – Dag Østerberg, sociologist and musicologist (b. 1938).
- 25 February – Jan Hoem, demographer (b. 1939).
- 28 February – Jarle Høysæter, journalist (b. 1933).
- 28 February – Eigil Nansen, architect and humanitarian (b. 1931).
- 3 March – Anne Kristin Sydnes, politician (b. 1956).
- 3 March – Thor Tjøntveit, aviator (b. 1936).
- 5 March – Ivar J. Hauge, politician (b. 1936).
- 7 March – Henning Kramer Dahl, poet (b. 1956).
- 9 March – Jacqueline Naze Tjøtta, mathematician (b. 1935).
- 12 March – Sverre Bergh Johansen, diplomat (b. 1939).
- 16 March – Hans Brattrud, designer (b. 1933).
- 16 March – Arne Høivik, footballer (b. 1932).
- 19 March – Martin Mork, oceanographer (b. 1933).
- 21 March – Arne Herjuaune, speed skater (b. 1945).
- 23 March – Sølvi Sogner, historian (b. 1932).
- 23 March – Arnfinn Lund, horse trainer (b. 1935).
- 25 March – Asbjørn Hansen, footballer (b. 1930).
- 26 March – Audun Bakke, editor (b. 1933).
- 3 April – Leif Klette, fencer (b. 1927).
- 6 April – Rolf Sagen, author (b. 1940).
- 6 April – Jan Mikkelsen, politician (b. 1933).
- 7 April – Frans Widerberg, painter (b. 1934).
- 9 April – Knut Borge, journalist and entertainer (b. 1949).
- 10 April – Bab Christensen, actress (b. 1928).
- 10 April – Øyvind Klingberg, pianist and showman (b. 1943).
- 18 April – Arild Engh, drummer (b. 1946).
- 22 April – Bjarte Eikeset, judge and politician (b. 1937).
- 23 April – Kjell Raaheim, psychologist (b. 1930).
- 25 April – Rolf Fjeldvær, politician (b. 1926).
- 25 April – Tor Espedal, businessperson (b. 1934).
- 27 April – Sigurd B. Hennum, journalist (b. 1930).
- 30 April – Anders Omholt, physicist (b. 1926).
- 2 May – Ole Meier Kjerkol, politician (b. 1946).
- 2 May – Harry Herstad, politician (b. 1946).
- 3 May – John Bjørnebye, diplomat (b. 1941).
- 7 May – Eivind Eckbo, politician (b. 1927).
- 7 May – Svend Wam, film director (b. 1946).
- 8 May – Kåre Opdal, alpine skier (b. 1931).
- 11 May – Walter Kolstad, trade unionist (b. 1931).
- 12 May – Eva Lange, painter (b. 1944).
- 16 May – Ivar S. A. Isaksen, meteorologist (b. 1937).
- 17 May – Tor Morisse, illustrator and cartoonist (b. 1947).
- 18 May – Tor Fredrik Rasmussen, geographer (b. 1926).
- 19 May – Reidar Torp, military officer (b. 1922).
- 21 May – Anne Nyutstumo, performer (b. 1958).
- 24 May – William Duborgh Jensen, designer (b. 1935).
- 1 June – Ludvig Hope Faye, politician (b. 1934).
- 3 June – Kolbjørn Skaare, numismatician (b. 1931).
- 6 June – Ragnhild Queseth Haarstad, politician (b. 1939).
- 7 June – Jan Høiland, singer (b. 1939)
- 8 June – Morten Ågheim, ski jumper (b. 1980)
- 9 June – Frank A. Jenssen, journalist, photographer, novelist and musician (b. 1952).
- 11 June – Ragnar Rommetveit, psychologist (b. 1924).
- 16 June – Hans Olav Tungesvik, politician (b. 1936).
- 18 June – Ola Skarholt, orienteer (b. 1939).
- 18 June – Kristian Tambs, psychologist (b. 1951).
- 20 June – Frode Larsen, footballer (b. 1949).
- 20 June – Fredrik Skagen, crime writer (b. 1936)
- 22 June – Arne Garvang, musician (b. 1949).
- 24 June – Steinar Mediaas, journalist (b. 1946).
- 24 June – Hroar Stange, politician (b. 1921).
- 26 June – Kåre Ellingsgård, politician (b. 1926).
- 5 July – Peter Pran, architect (b. 1935).
- 7 July – Egil Monn-Iversen, music leader (b. 1928)
- 7 July – Elisabeth Armand, writer (b. 1923).
- 8 July – Siri Austeng, politician (b. 1944).
- 9 July – Einar Myklebust, architect (b. 1920).
- 13 July – Egil Kapstad, pianist (b. 1940).
- 14 July – Lillebet Foss, sculptor and painter (b. 1930).
- 17 July – Torvild Aakvaag, businessperson (b. 1927).
- Wilhelm Blystad, businessperson (b. 1951).
- 24 July – Jørgen Kosmo, politician (b. 1947).
- 24 July – Øivind Solheim, ice hockey player (b. 1928).
- 28 July – Runa Førde, painter and illustrator (b. 1933).
- 28 July – Stein Mehren, poet (b. 1935).
- 28 July – Håvard Holm, civil servant (b. 1943).
- 29 July – Hans-Jakob Brun, museum director (b. 1942).
- 2 August – Tore Bøgh, diplomat (b. 1924).
- 7 August – Tor Røste Fossen, football manager (b. 1940).
- 7 August – Kjellfred Weum, hurdler (b. 1940).
- 20 August – Karin Bang, novelist (b. 1928).
- 27 August – Tore Bongo, politician (b. 1952).
- 28 August – Rikard Olsvik, politician (b. 1930).
- 3 September – Tom Amundsen, sport rower and physician (b. 1943).
- 6 September – Hugo Wathne, sculptor (b. 1932).
- 9 September – Frank Aarebrot, political scientist (b. 1947).
- 13 September – Per Fugelli, professor of medicine (b. 1943).
- 13 September – Svein Valla, molecular biologist (b. 1948).
- 15 September – Frode Granhus, crime writer (b. 1965).
- 17 September – Sven Oluf Sørensen, physicist (b. 1920).
- 17 September – Per Kleiva, painter (b. 1933).
- 19 September – Else Marie Christiansen, speed skater (b. 1921).
- 19 September – Anker Hagen, sport shooter (b. 1920).
- 20 September – Arne Solli, Chief of Defence (b. 1938).
- 23 September – Aline Nistad, trombonist (b. 1954).
- 24 September – Tharald Brøvig Jr., ship-owner (b. 1942).
- 25 September – Hans Nylund, footballer (b. 1939).
- 26 September – Sigmund Vangsnes, educationalist (b. 1926).
- 29 September – Tore Lindbekk, sociologist (b. 1933).
- 30 September – Gunnar Thoresen, footballer (b. 1920).
- 2 October – Øyvin Norborg, editor (b. 1939).
- 3 October – Carsten Henrik Schanche, businessperson (b. 1922).
- 7 October – Jan Arvid Johansen, singer (b. 1947).
- 8 October – Lise Vislie, educationalist (b. 1932).
- 22 October – Atle Hammer, trumpetist (b. 1932).
- 28 October – Leif Ottersen, singer (b. 1928).
- 1 November – Tor Henriksen, politician (b. 1933).
- 8 November – Bjarne Semb, physician (b. 1939).
- 9 November – Grete Berget, politician (b. 1954).
- 10 November – Knut Mørkved, diplomat (b. 1938).
- 11 November – Baard Owe, actor (b. 1936).
- 11 November – Lars Oftedal Broch, Supreme Court justice (b. 1939).
- 11 November – Willy Johan Fredriksen, diplomat (b. 1930).
- 12 November – Børre Olsen, jewel designer (b. 1964).
- 17 November – Edvin Helseth, furniture designer (b. 1925).
- 23 November – Ingrid I. Willoch, politician (b. 1943).
- 25 November – Stein Robert Ludvigsen, music producer and impresario (b. 1943).
- 1 December – Åshild Hauan, politician (b. 1941).
- 2 December – Dag Åkeson Moe, television presenter.
- 3 December – Kjell Opseth, politician (b. 1936).
- 3 December – Solveig Høysæter, magazine editor (b. 1932).
- 5 December – Svein Scharffenberg, actor (b. 1939).
- 13 December – Noralv Teigen, actor (b. 1932).
- 17 December – Ingmund Holtås, skier (b. 1933).
- 18 December – Johan C. Løken, politician (b. 1944).
- 19 December – Harry Sønsterød, resistance member (b. 1921).
- 21 December – Halvard Kausland, musician (b. 1945).
- 29 December – Odd Fossengen, motorcycle speedway rider (b. 1945).
- 30 December – Ole Fyrand, physician (b. 1937).

== See also ==
- 2017 in Norwegian music
