= 1932 in Norway =

- Centuries: 18th; 19th; 20th; 21st
- Decades: 1910s; 1920s; 1930s; 1940s; 1950s
- See also: List of years in Norway

Events in the year 1932 in Norway.

== Incumbents ==
- Monarch – Haakon VII.
- Prime Minister – Peder Kolstad, until death in March then Jens Hundseid

== Events ==
- 12 July – Norway annexes King Frederick VI Coast in Greenland.

== Popular culture ==
=== Literature ===
- Stokke, Bernhard. I natt rømmer vi.

== Births ==
=== January to March ===
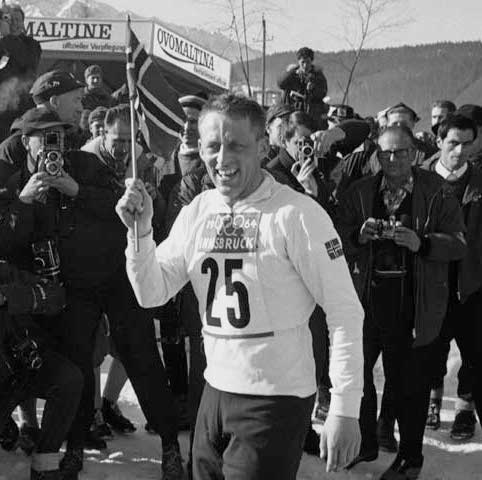
Tormod Knutsen

- 7 January – Tormod Knutsen, Nordic combined skier and Olympic gold medallist (died 2021).
- 11 January – Arne Barhaugen, Nordic combined skier (died 2008)
- 19 January – Knut Korsæth, educator, sports official and politician (died 2022)
- 20 January – Alv Jakob Fostervoll, politician and Minister (died 2015)
- 20 January – Finn Alnæs, novelist (died 1991).
- 31 January – Per Grieg, ship broker and ship owner (died 2024).
- 12 February –
  - Princess Astrid of Norway (died 2026)
  - Axel Jensen, author and poet (died 2003)
  - Kristian Lund, military officer, engineer and politician (died 2012).
- 1 March – Kåre Berg, professor in medical genetics (died 2009)
- 4 March – Sigurd Jansen, composer, pianist and conductor
- 8 March – Per Høybråten, politician (died 1990)
- 15 March – Sølvi Sogner, historian (died 2017).

=== April to June ===
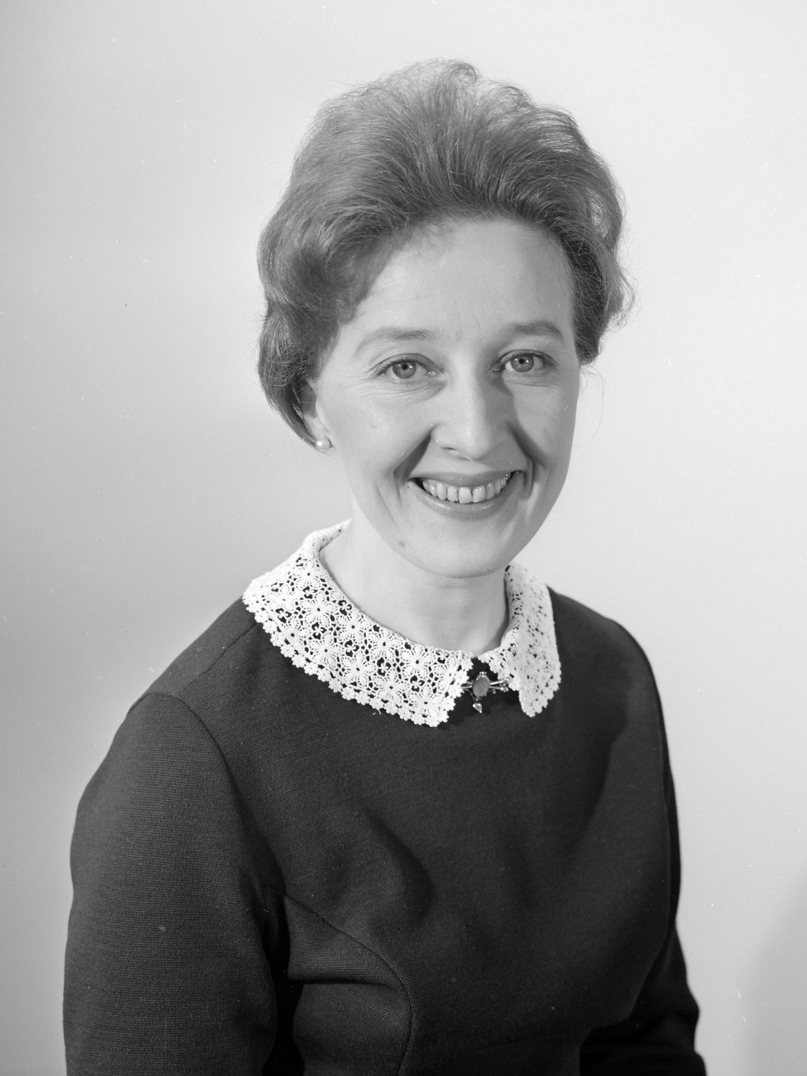
Astrid Folstad

- 2 April – Hroar Elvenes, speed skater (died 2014)
- 19 April – Trygve Berge, alpine skier (died 2026).
- 30 April – Kjell Hanssen, politician (died 2014)
- 5 May – Børt-Erik Thoresen, television host and folk singer (died 2011)
- 8 May – Astrid Murberg Martinsen, politician (died 1991)
- 10 May – Magne Malmanger, art historian (died 2023).
- 11 May – Ingrid Schjelderup, politician (died 2022)
- 21 May – Sven Nyhus, folk musician (died 2023).
- 26 May – Per Øyvind Heradstveit, television journalist (died 2004).
- 31 May – Astrid Folstad, actress (died 2009)
- 4 June – Torstein Tynning, politician (died 2000)
- 5 June – Helga Haugen, politician
- 12 June – Per Ditlev-Simonsen, politician and Minister
- 13 June – Kari Risvik, translator (died 2021).
- 19 June – Karstein Hansen, politician
- 22 June – Dagfinn Føllesdal, professor of philosophy
- 22 June – Ove Kristian Sundberg, church musician, musicologist and historian of ideas (died 2019).

=== July to September ===
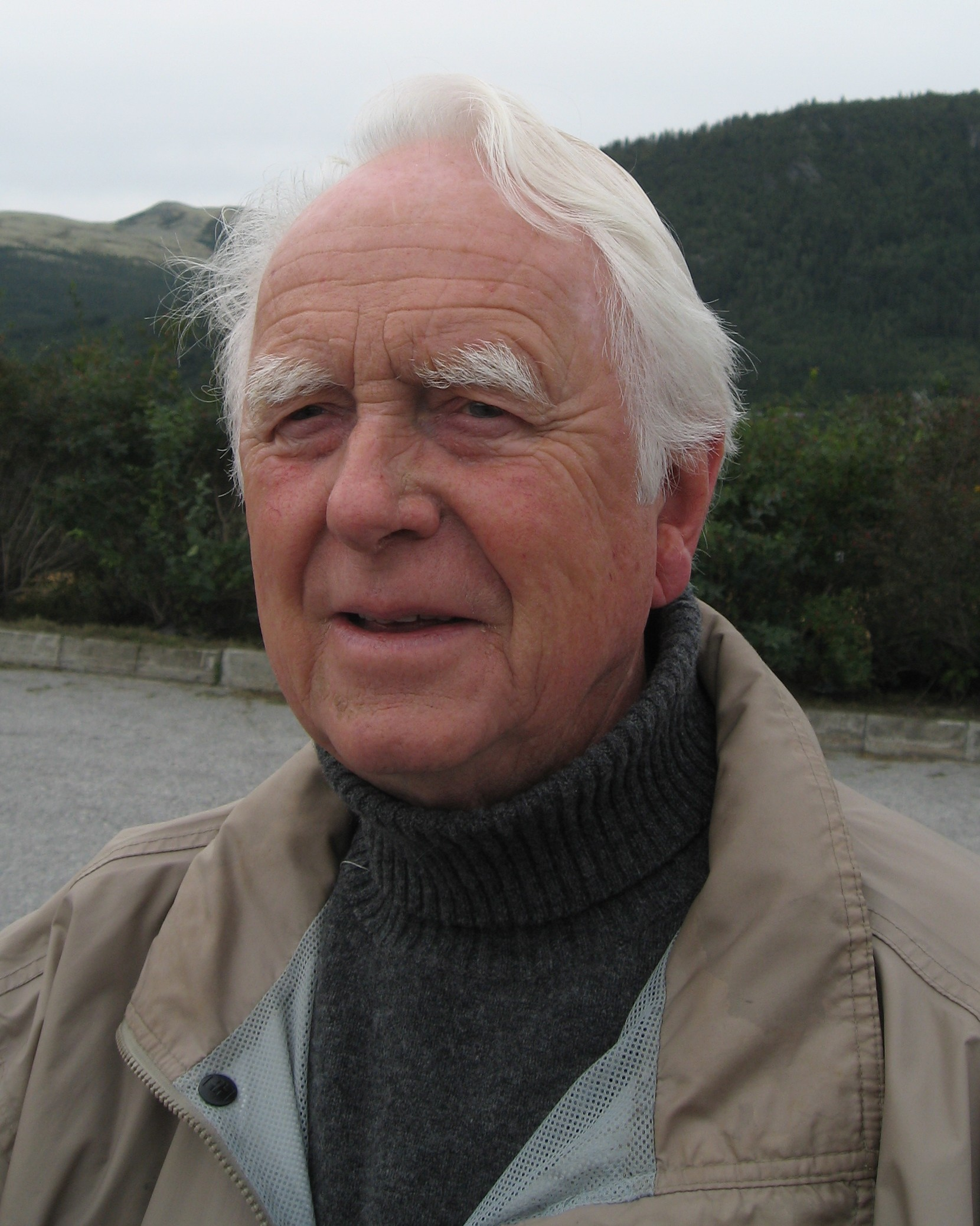
Ola Jonsmoen

- 9 July – Ola Jonsmoen, writer.
- 14 July – Leif Solheim, ice hockey player (died 2024).
- 24 July – Ruth Ryste, politician
- 26 July – Knut Bjørnsen, sports commentator and journalist (died 2008)
- 4 August – Olav Angell, poet, novelist and translator (died 2018)
- 6 August – Kjartan Slettemark, artist (died 2008).
- 8 August – Leif Arne Heløe, politician and Minister
- 26 August – Asgeir Dølplads, ski jumper
- 30 August – Ottar Brox, social scientist and politician
- 6 September – Arve Hans Otterlei, politician

=== October to December ===
- 3 October – Bengt Calmeyer, journalist and novelist.
- 5 October – Kari Rasmussen, singer and actress (died 2021).
- 7 October – Helge Stalsberg, physician
- 8 October – Per Theodor Haugen, actor (died 2018)
- 12 November – Magne Lystad, orienteering champion (died 1999)
- 12 December – Asbjørn Jordahl, politician and Minister
- 16 December – Kjell Heggelund, literary researcher, lecturer, editor, poet, translator and literary critic (died 2017).
- 26 December – Oluf Skarpnes, jurist (died 2019)

== Deaths ==
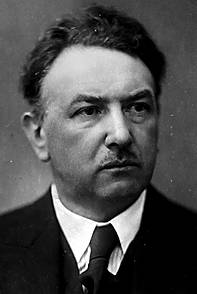
Peder Kolstad

- 5 March – Peder Kolstad, politician and Prime Minister of Norway (born 1878)
- 17 March – Georg Brustad, gymnast and Olympic bronze medallist (born 1892)
- 5 April – Kristian Friis Petersen, politician and Minister (born 1867)
- 9 April – Sophie Reimers, actress (born 1853).
- 19 April – Lars Oftedal, politician and Minister (born 1877)
- 28 May – Ejnar Torgensen, sailor and Olympic silver medallist (born 1900)
- 28 June – Urania Marquard Olsen, Danish-born actress and theatre director (born 1856)
- 26 August – Edvard Bull, Sr., historian and politician (born 1881)
- 7 December – Joachim Grieg, ship broker and politician (born 1849).
- 16 December – Albert Gran, actor (born 1862)
- 24 December – Eyvind Alnæs, composer, pianist, organist and choir director (born 1872)

=== Full date unknown ===
- Simon Christian Hammer, writer and journalist (born 1866)
