= 1928 in Norway =

- Centuries: 18th; 19th; 20th; 21st
- Decades: 1900s; 1910s; 1920s; 1930s; 1940s
- See also: List of years in Norway

Events in the year 1928 in Norway.

== Incumbents ==
- Monarch – Haakon VII.
- Prime Minister –
  - until 28 January – Ivar Lykke
  - 28 January–15 February – Christopher Hornsrud
  - starting 15 February – Johan Ludwig Mowinckel

== Events ==
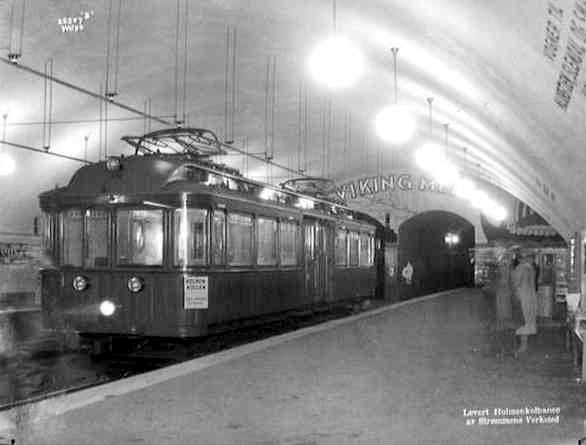
Holmenkoll Line tram at Nationaltheatret in 1928

- 27 June – The opening of the underground railway line to Nationaltheatret station in Oslo .
- At Herøya, outside Porsgrunn, Norsk Hydro establishes what is to become Norway's largest industrial park.
- The city of Fredrikshald changed its name to Halden.
- Municipal and county elections are held throughout the country.

== Popular culture ==
=== Sports ===
- Bernt Evensen, speed skater, Olympic gold medallist and racing cyclist, is awarded the Egebergs Ærespris for his achievements in speed skating and cycling.

=== Literature ===
- Sigrid Undset was awarded the Nobel Prize for Literature.

== Notable births ==
=== January to March ===
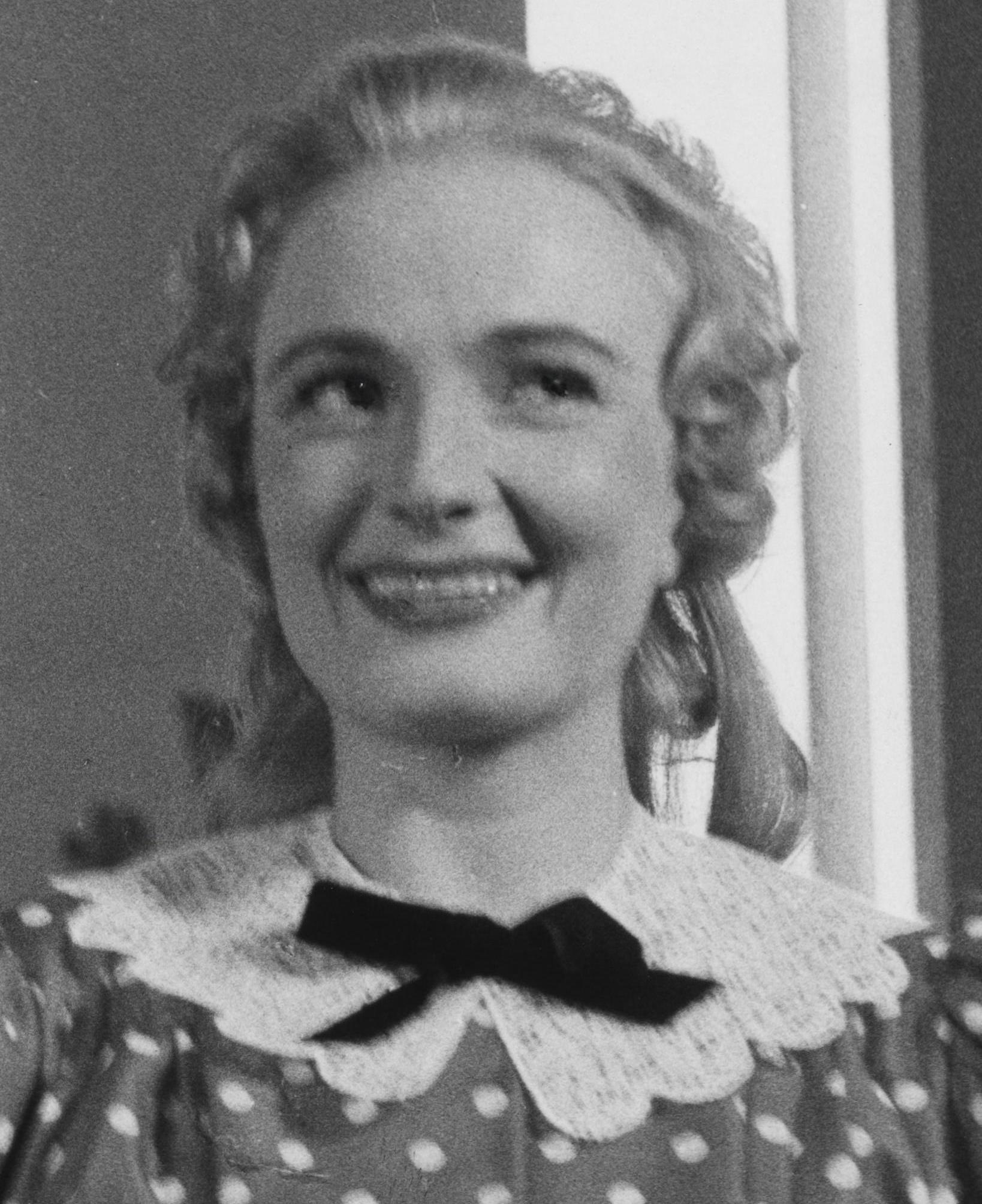
Bab Christensen

- 8 January – Bab Christensen, actress (died 2017).
- 25 January – Rolf Nilssen, politician (died 2012)
- 3 February – Kjell Magne Fredheim, politician (died 2006)
- 7 February – Sonja Ludvigsen, politician and Minister (died 1974)
- 10 February – Sissel Sellæg, actress (died 2014)
- 23 February – Bjørn Unneberg, politician (died 2020)
- 24 February – Nils Christie, sociologist and criminologist (died 2015).
- 24 February – Per Lønning, bishop, theologian, professor and politician (died 2016)
- 26 February – Gordon Hølmebakk, publishing editor (died 2018).
- 29 February – Anders Myklebust, politician (died 2020)
- 18 March – Hans Bjørnstad, ski jumper and World Champion (died 2007)
- 25 March – Roald Aas, speed skater and Olympic gold medallist and cyclist (died 2012)

=== April to June ===
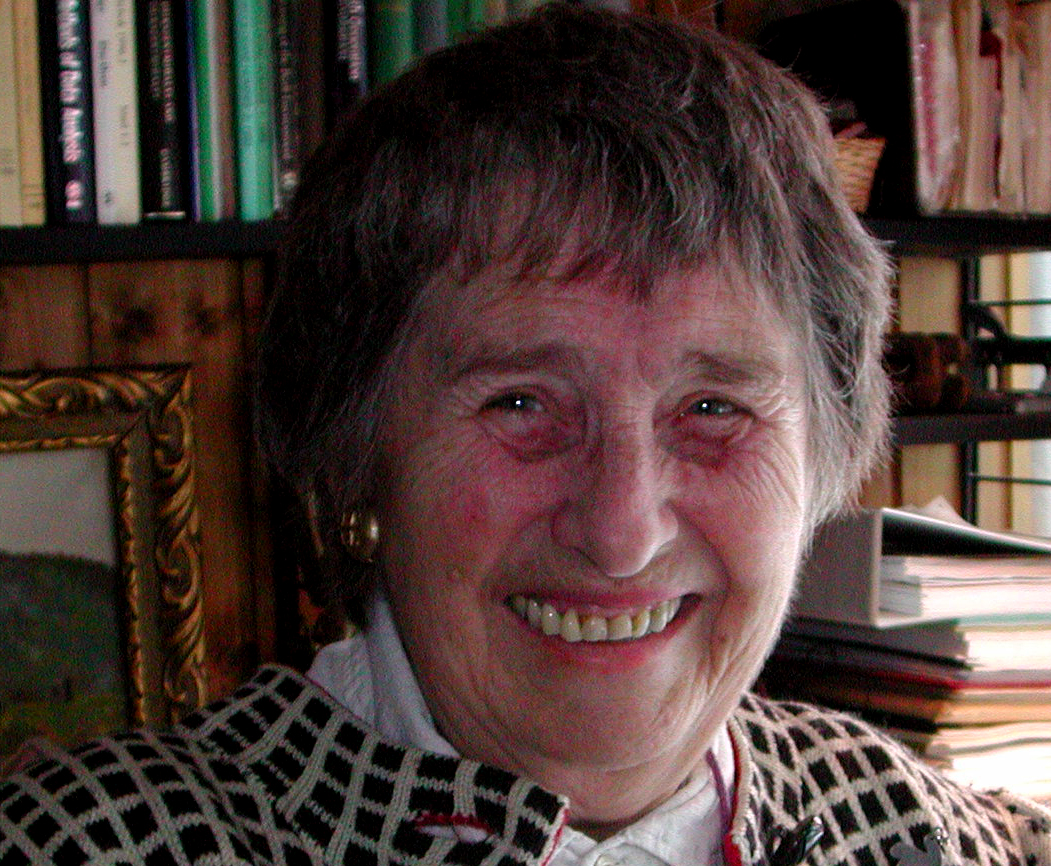
Berit Ås

- 6 April – Marit Rotnes, politician (died 2022).
- 8 April – Yngvar Ustvedt, writer (died 2007).
- 9 April – Erling Norvik, politician (died 1998)
- 10 April – Berit Ås, politician, professor of social psychology and feminist (died 2024).
- 14 April
  - Juul Bjerke, economist (died 2014).
  - Egil Monn-Iversen, composer (died 2017)
- 20 April – Svein Døvle Larssen, newspaper editor (died 2015)
- 6 May – Per J. Husabø, politician (died 2012)
- 10 May – Bjørg Løhner Øien, figure skater (died 2015).
- 12 May – Karin Sundbye, textile artist (died 2024).
- 17 May – Dag Skogheim teacher, poet, novelist, short story writer, biographer and non-fiction writer (died 2015).
- 19 May – Arvid Nyberg, politician (died 2022)
- 21 May – Inge Johansen, electrical engineer (died 2018)
- 28 May – Grethe Werner, sportswoman (died 2014).
- 29 May – Harald Hennum, international soccer player (died 1993)
- 26 June – Olav Haukvik, politician and Minister (died 1992)

=== July to September ===
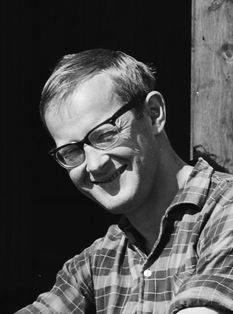
Haagen Ringnes

- 1 July – Andreas Aarflot, theologian, bishop emeritus in the Church of Norway
- 19 July – Tone Thiis Schjetne, sculptor (died 2015).
- 27 July – Bill Johansen, ice hockey player in Canada (died 2001)
- 28 July – Tove Billington Bye, politician (died 2008)
- 4 August – Helge Høva, politician (died 2010)
- 10 August
  - Per Asplin, actor (died 1996)
  - Haagen Ringnes, journalist and author (died 2008)
- 15 August
  - Inger Koppernæs, politician and Minister (died 1990)
  - Fritz Røed, sculptor (died 2002)
- 17 August – Arnt Gudleik Hagen, politician (died 2007)
- 23 August – Tor Stokke, actor (died 2003)
- 4 September – Tor Arneberg, sailor and Olympic silver medallist (died 2015)
- 14 September – Astrid Gjertsen, politician and minister (died 2020).
- 15 September – Brikt Jensen, writer, editor, literary manager, professor and television producer (died 2011).
- 19 September – Bjørn Sand, revue writer and actor (died 2024).
- 21 September – Liv Aasen, politician (died 2005)
- 25 September – Kirsten Myklevoll, politician and Minister (died 1996)
- 27 September – Kjell Bohlin, politician (died 2011)
- 29 September – Johan Kleppe, politician and minister (died 2022)

=== October to December ===
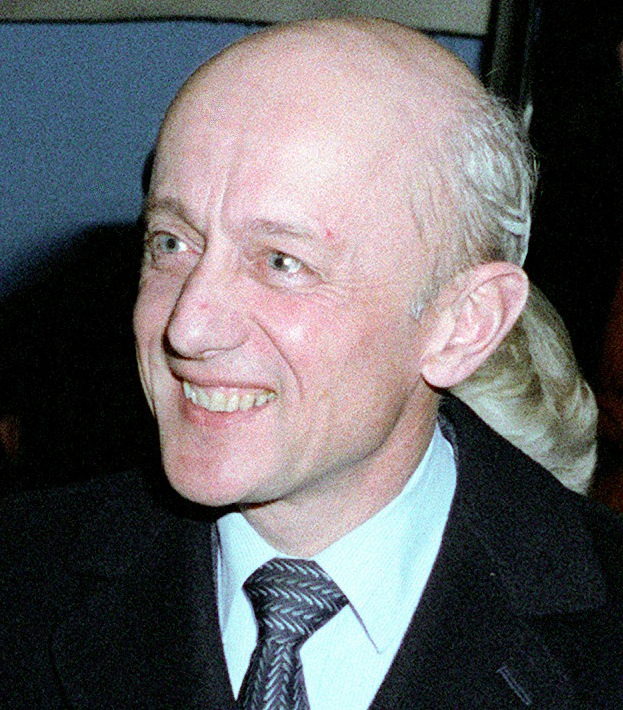
Kåre Willoch

- 3 October – Kåre Willoch, politician (died 2021).
- 5 October – Charles Philipson, judge and civil servant (died 1990).
- 13 October – Arnulf Olsen, politician (died 2021)
- 20 October – Kjell Egil Eimhjellen, microbiologist (died 2023)
- 23 October – Jan Frøystein Halvorsen, judge (died 2016)
- 7 November – Roald Åsmund Bye, politician (died 2003)
- 8 November – Odd Langholm, economist and historian of economic thought
- 17 November – Torbjørn Mork, physician and civil servant (died 1992).
- 19 November – Reidar Birkeland, veterinarian (died 2018)
- 24 November – Arne Langeland, jurist, civil servant and diplomat (died 2019)
- 1 December – Arild Andresen, soccer and ice hockey player (died 2008)
- 3 December – Karin Bang, poet, novelist, children's writer and crime writer (died 2017).
- 5 December – Leif Ottersen, priest (died 2017)
- 10 December – Dagfinn Aarskog, physician (died 2014).
- 16 December – Bjørn Haug, judge (died 2020)
- 22 December – Arne Øien, economist, politician and Minister (died 1998)
- 29 December – Marit Øiseth, sprinter and cross country skier (died 1971)

=== Full date unknown ===
- Helge Barstad, politician (died 2012)

== Notable deaths ==
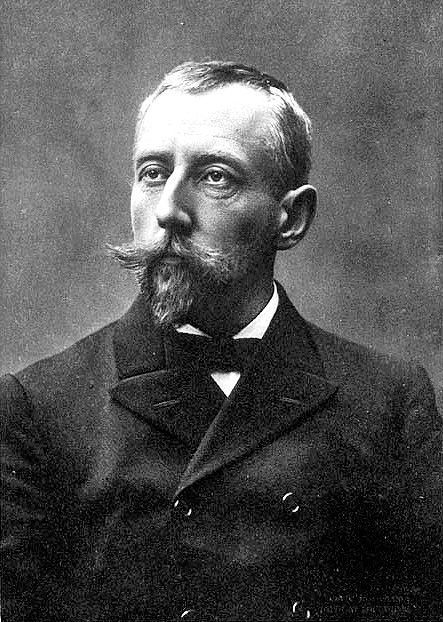
Roald Amundsen

- 16 January – Bjarne Solberg, physician and politician (born 1877)
- 18 January – Nordahl Rolfsen, writer, educationalist and teacher, journalist, translator and speaker (born 1848)
- 21 January – Nikolai Astrup, painter (born 1880)
- 7 February – Herman Johan Foss Reimers, politician and Minister (born 1843)
- 9 February – Anna Bugge, feminist (born 1862)
- 27 April – Amund B. Larsen, linguist (born 1849)
- 13 June – Randi Blehr, women's rights activist (born 1851).
- 17 June – Torgrim Castberg, violinist (born 1874)
- 6 June – Sverre Hassel, polar explorer (born 1876)
- June – Roald Amundsen, polar explorer, led the first Antarctic expedition to reach the South Pole (born 1872)
- 14 July – August Geelmuyden Spørck, politician and Minister (born 1851)
- 10 October – Karl Lous, barrister (born 1847).
- 11 September – Per Klingenberg Hestetun, politician (born 1877)
- 1 December – Gunnar Knudsen, politician and twice Prime Minister of Norway (born 1848)
- 29 December – Eilif Peterssen, painter (born 1852)

=== Full date unknown ===
- Hartvig Sverdrup Eckhoff, architect (born 1855)
