= 1931 in Norway =

- Centuries: 18th; 19th; 20th; 21st
- Decades: 1910s; 1920s; 1930s; 1940s; 1950s
- See also: List of years in Norway

Events in the year 1931 in Norway.

== Incumbents ==
- Monarch – Haakon VII.
- Prime Minister – Johan Ludwig Mowinckel until 12 May, then Peder Kolstad

== Events ==
- 8 June – The Menstad conflict.
- 27 June – Norway occupied and claimed parts of the then-uninhabited eastern Greenland (also called Erik the Red's Land), claiming that it constituted terra nullius.
- Municipal and county elections are held throughout the country.

== Notable births ==
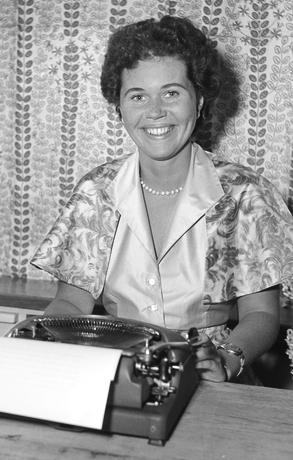
Eva Seeberg

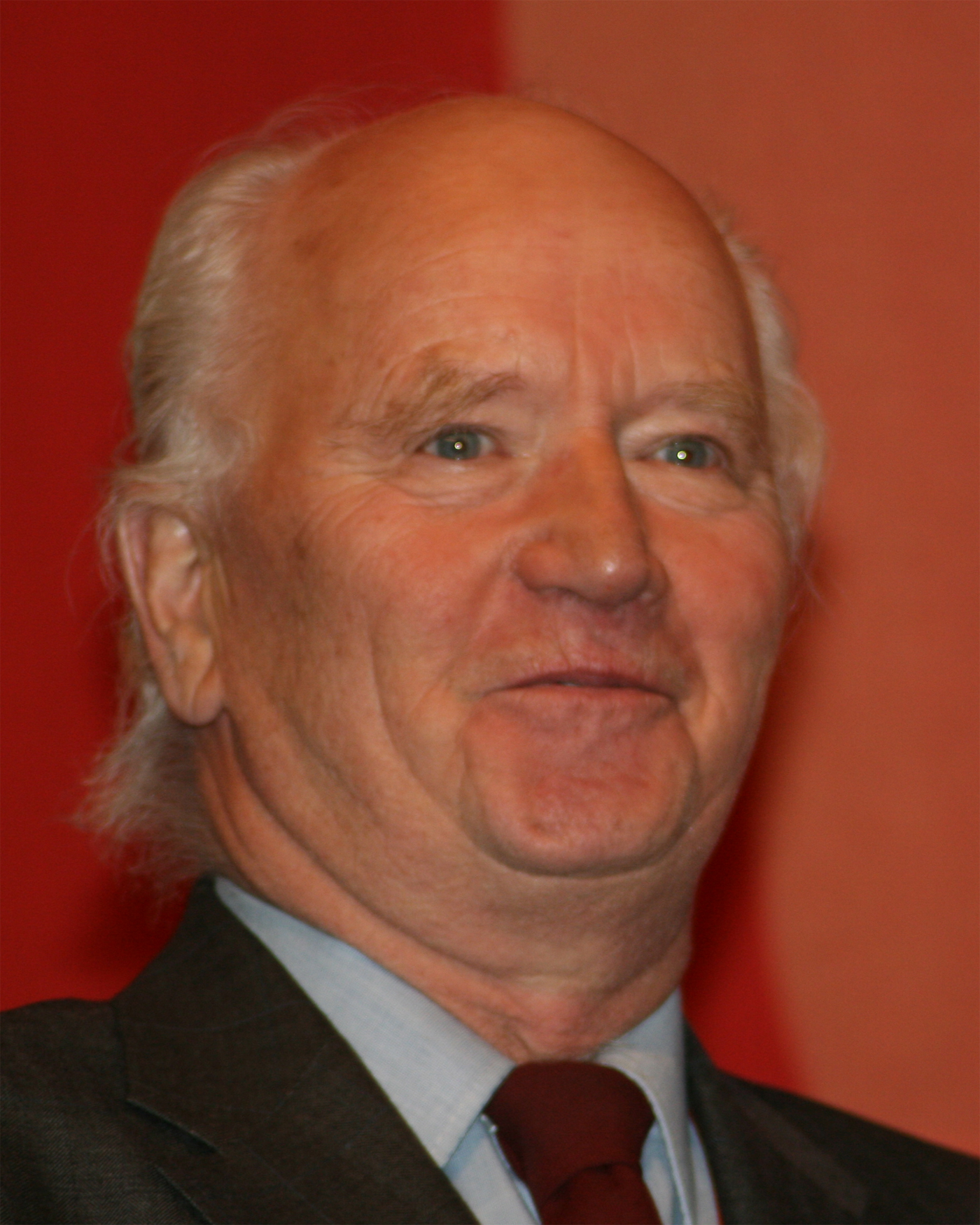
Thorvald Stoltenberg

- 3 January – Jan Økland, limnologist.
- 10 January – Olaf B. Bjørnstad, ski jumper (died 2013).
- 26 January – Jon Gjønnes, physicist (died 2021).
- 27 January – Sissel Lange-Nielsen, writer, literary critic, and journalist (died 2023).
- 30 January – Arnfinn Johs. Stein, politician (died 2024).
- 31 January – Ole Gabriel Ueland, politician (died 2009).
- 22 February – Georg Johannesen, author and professor of rhetoric (died 2005)
- 2 March – Halvdan Furholt, folk musician (died 2024).
- 4 March – Ludvig Hope Faye, politician (died 2017).
- 12 March – Knut Bohwim, film director (died 2020).
- 23 March – Kjell Knudsen, politician (died 2022)
- 2 April – Åslaug Grinde, politician (died 2019)
- 5 April – Peter R. Holm, poet, author and translator
- 11 April – Olav Marås, politician
- 24 April – Eva Seeberg, journalist and writer (died 2019).
- 26 April – Øyvind Bjorvatn, politician (died 2015)
- 26 April – Ola Mikal Heide, botanist
- 27 April – Vera Louise Holmøy, judge
- 28 April – Karen Sogn, politician (died 2013)
- 9 May – Erik Dammann, author and environmentalist
- 19 May – Leif Raa, illustrator (died 2003).
- 25 May - Selmer Nilsen, spy (died 1991)
- 31 May - Yngvar Løchen, sociologist (died 1998)
- 5 June - Einar Magnussen, economist and politician (died 2004)
- 6 June – Einar Kringlen, phychiatrist (died 2025).
- 18 June - Eigil Nansen, human rights activist (died 2017)
- 20 June – Arne Nordheim, composer (died 2010)
- 8 July – Thorvald Stoltenberg, politician and Minister (died 2018).
- 24 July – Sverre Holm, actor (died 2005)
- 8 August – Halvor Bergan, theologian (died 2015).
- 25 August – Sven Ivar Dysthe, furniture designer (died 2020).
- 5 September – Torstein Slungård, politician (died 2009)
- 1 October – Tore Haugen, politician
- 6 October – Johan M. Nyland, politician (died 2007)
- 11 October – Bjørn Slettan, historian (died 2014)
- 12 October – Ole-Johan Dahl, computer scientist (died 2002)
- 6 November – Bjartmar Gjerde, politician (died 2009)
- 8 November – Ole Knapp, politician and Minister (died 2015)
- 23 November – Karin Stoltenberg, geneticist, politician (died 2012).
- 30 November – Knut Myhre, politician (died 2003)
- 7 December – Bjørg Lødøen, painter, graphic artist and composer (died 2009)
- 15 December – Alf Nordvang, actor and theatre director (died 2007)

== Notable deaths ==
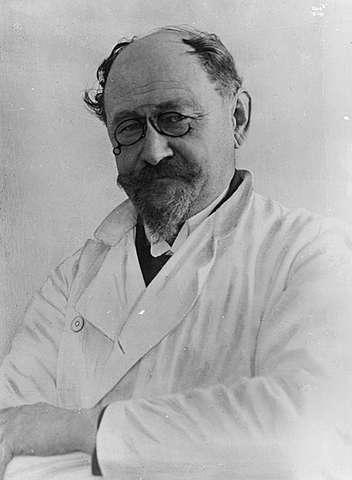
Olav Johan Sopp

- 20 January – Margrethe Munthe, childten’s writer and songwriter (born 1860).
- 31 March – Knute Rockne, American football player and coach (born 1888)
- 11 April – Sophus Aars, civil servant and writer (born 1841).
- 23 April – Nils P. Haugen, a U.S. Representative from Wisconsin (born 1849)
- 26 April – Axel Holst, professor of hygiene and bacteriology (born 1860)
- 14 August – Olav Johan Sopp, mycologist (born 1860).
- 18 August – Konrad Dahl, writer and priest (born 1843).
- 1 September – Anders Andersen, politician (born 1846)
- 27 September – Thorleif Frederik Schjelderup, businessperson (born 1859)
- 5 November – Ole Edvart Rølvaag, novelist and professor in America (born 1876)
- 11 November – Marie Hauge, painter (born 1864)
- 17 December – Hans Nilsen Hauge, priest, politician and Minister (born 1853)

=== Full date unknown ===
- Johan Aschehoug Kiær, paleontologist and geologist (born 1869)
