= Tidemann =

Tidemann is a surname. Notable people with the surname include:

- Carl August Tidemann (born 1971), Norwegian guitarist and composer
- Carl-Fredrik Michelet Tidemann (1932–2017), Norwegian physician and military officer
- Larry Tidemann (born 1948), American politician

== See also ==
- Tideman
