= Ivar S.A. Isaksen =

Norwegian meteorologist

Ivar Sigmund Angell Isaksen (25 November 1937 – 16 May 2017) was a Norwegian meteorologist and climate researcher.

== Early life and career ==
He was born in Kåfjord. Growing up in the hamlet Djupvik, the area was razed by German troops during World War II, driven back by Soviet and Allied troops during the liberation of Northern Norway. Isaksen and his family therefore became internally displaced in Trondheim until the summer of 1945. He took lower secondary education in Målselv. He finished his secondary education in 1958 and graduated from the University of Oslo with the cand.real. degree in geophysics in 1967.

While studying, he was also a middle and long-distance runner the club Oslo-Studentene, among others running the 3000 metres in 8:07.6 minutes (June 1964, Stockholm) and the 5000 metres in 14:1.8 minutes (September 1965, Belgrade). The latter came at an athletics international between Norway and Yugoslavia, ending in a 95–100 point score. Isaksen finished second behind Simo Važić.

== Academic career ==
Isaksen was a research assistant at the University of Oslo from 1969. Finishing his dr.philos. degree in 1973, he held research grants from the University of Oslo from 1973 to 1978 and the NAVF until 1981. Isaksen was then appointed as professor at the University of Oslo in 1981, becoming a head of research at the new Center for International Climate Research (CICERO) in 1991. His field was originally theoretical meteorology, but Isaksen was among the pioneers of atmospheric chemistry.

He sat on a Scientific Steering Committee of Eurotrac (1987–91), the International Ozone Commission (1980–92), Commission on Atmospheric Chemistry and Global Pollution, the NATO Science Committee on Global Environmental Change and the Intergovernmental Panel on Climate Change. He was inducted into the Norwegian Academy of Science and Letters in 1994.

Late in his life, Isaksen and his wife emigrated to Kuala Lumpur to stay close to family who had moved there earlier. He died there in May 2017, aged 79.
