= Skule (given name) =

Skule is a given name. Notable people with the name include:

- Skule Bårdsson (c. 1189–1240), Norwegian nobleman
- Skule Storheill (1907–1992), Norwegian naval officer
- Skule Waksvik (1927–2018), Norwegian sculptor
