= Hova =

Hova may refer to:

- Jay-Z, an American rapper, businessman
- Hova (Madagascar), one of the three main social classes in the pre-colonial Kingdom of Imerina in Madagascar
- Hova, Sweden, a locality
  - Battle of Hova, fought in 1275
- French destroyer Hova, a French ship which served in World War I
- USS Hova (DE-110), a World War II Free French and post-war French Navy frigate
- Helge Høva (1928–2010), Norwegian politician
- Hova, a character in the 2006 animated movie The Ant Bully, voiced by Julia Roberts
