= Arild Andresen =

Arild Andresen may refer to:

- Arild Andresen (sportsman) (1928–2008), Norwegian football and ice hockey player
- Arild Andresen (director) (born 1967), Norwegian film director
