= Gunnar Gundersen =

Gunnar Gundersen may refer to:

- Gunnar Gundersen (politician) (born 1956), Norwegian politician and Olympic swimmer
- Gunnar S. Gundersen (1921–1983), Norwegian modernist painter.
- Gunnar Gundersen (chess player) (1882–1943), Australian chess master
- Gunnar Bull Gundersen (1929–1993), Norwegian sailor, novelist, playwright and lyricist
- Gunnar Edvard Gundersen (1927–2017), Norwegian economist, politician and organizational leader
