= Academic grading in Svalbard =

Measures of academic achievement in Svalbard

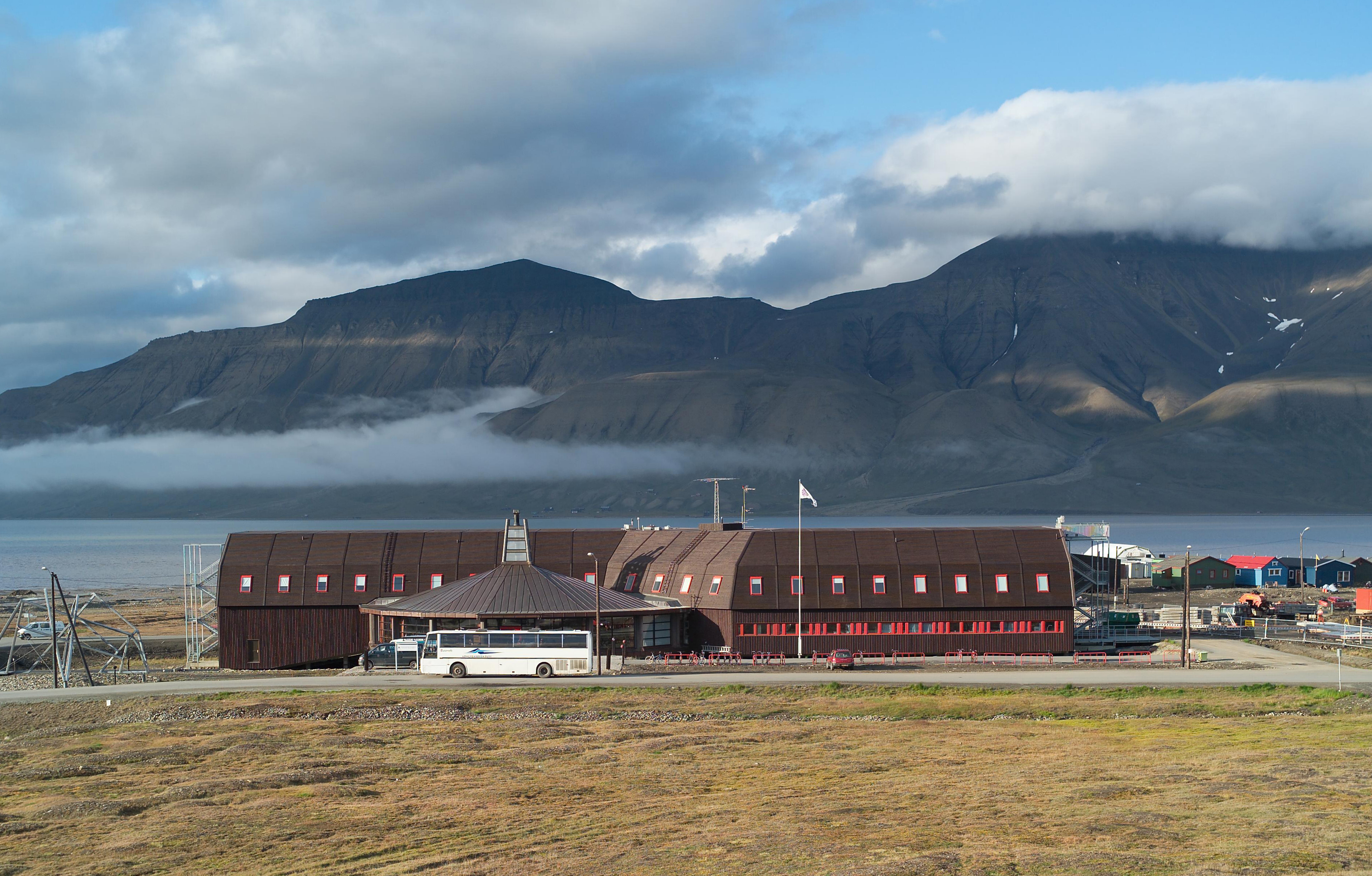
The main building of the University Centre in Svalbard.

Academic grading in Svalbard is performed at the University Centre in Svalbard and at the Longyearbyen School.

The University Center of Svalbard use the same university grading system as in mainland Norway:

| Symbol | Description | General, qualitative description of valuation criteria |
|---|---|---|
| A | Excellent | An excellent performance, clearly outstanding. The candidate demonstrates excellent judgement and a high degree of independent thinking. |
| B | Very good | A very good performance. The candidate demonstrates sound judgement and a very good degree of independent thinking. |
| C | Good | A good performance in most areas. The candidate demonstrates a reasonable degree of judgement and independent thinking in the most important areas. |
| D | Satisfactory | A satisfactory performance, but with significant shortcomings. The candidate demonstrates a limited degree of judgement and independent thinking. |
| E | Sufficient | A performance that meets the minimum criteria, but no more. The candidate demonstrates a very limited degree of judgement and independent thinking. |
| F | Fail | A performance that does not meet the minimum academic criteria. The candidate demonstrates an absence of both judgement and independent thinking. |

There are no universities in the Russian-speaking areas of Svalbard.
