= Sigmund Vangsnes =

Norwegian educationalist

Sigmund Vangsnes (13 January 1926 – 26 September 2017) was a Norwegian educationalist.

He was born in Vik, and graduated with the cand.oecon (roughly equivalent to a Master in Economics) degree from the University of Oslo in 1954. He was the founder and director of the Nordic Institute for Studies in Innovation, Research and Education from 1961 to 1991, branching out of NAVF.
