= Tor Fredrik Rasmussen =

Norwegian geographer

Tor Fredrik Rasmussen (2 March 1926 – 18 May 2017) was a Norwegian geographer.

He was born in Flekkefjord. After finishing his secondary education he studied at the University of Oslo and worked as a geodesist in the Norwegian Geological Survey. He graduated with the mag.art. degree in 1952, and after spells as research assistant at the University of Oslo and research fellow at NAVF he was hired as a lecturer at the University of Oslo in 1960. From 1965 to 1969 he worked at the Norwegian Institute for Urban and Regional Research.

Rasmussen took the fil.dr. degree at Lund University in 1967, and was hired there as a docent the following year. Already the same year he became professor at the Nordiska institutet för samhällsplanering. After a stint at the Oslo City Planning Office from 1975 to 1981 he served as a professor of geography at the University of Oslo from 1981.

Rasmussen was an expert on economic geography and urban planning. He also conducted research travels in Ethiopia and India in the 1950s, resulting in several publications on India. He was also secretary and chairman of the Norwegian-Indian Society from 1959 to 1965. He chaired the Norwegian Housing and City Planning Association from 1981 to 1984.

He resided in Bærum Municipality and died at 91 years of age.
