= Øyvin Norborg =

Norwegian journalist, newspaper editor, and organizational leader

- Born: 19 September 1939; Oslo, Norway
- Died: 2 October 2017 (aged 78)
- Occupations: journalist and newspaper editor

Øyvin Norborg (19 September 1939 – 2 October 2017) was a Norwegian journalist, newspaper editor and organizational leader.

He was born in Oslo, and graduated in history and political science from the University of Oslo.

He was appointed journalist for Vårt Land from 1964, editor for Romsdals Budstikke from 1970 to 1983, editor for Drammens Tidende og Buskeruds Blad from 1983 to 1991, and for Østlandets Blad from 1991 to 1994. From 1994 to 2006 he served as chief editor of Kommunal Rapport.
