= Vera Holmøy =

Norwegian judge (1931–2021)

Vera Louise Holmøy, née Andersson (27 April 1931 – 12 December 2021) was a Norwegian judge. She was the third woman to serve on the Supreme Court of Norway, doing so from 1976 to 2001.

== Early life and education ==
She was born in Oslo as a daughter of Victor Arnold Andersson and Ingeborg née Fredriksen. Both her paternal grandparents were born in Sweden, hence the surname. Vera Andersson finished her secondary education with the examen artium in 1949 and graduated with the cand.jur. degree from the University of Oslo in 1954, with the grade laudabilis and being top of her class, though only marginally better than fellow future Supreme Court justice Nils Peder Langvand (they were graded 2.27 and 2.29, respectively, where 1 is best). Near the end of her Supreme Court tenure, her grade was also above the 2.30 average within the college at the time, placing her in the upper third within the college overall, though by very small margins.

In May 1956 she married Tor Ragnvald Holmøy, who also became a judge.

== Career in law ==
At the time Vera Holmøy studied law, few women studied this subject, and there was not a single female judge in Norway. Lilly Bølviken became the first in 1952. The prospects of Vera Holmøy having a career as a judge were not apparent, but she entered civil service. She was hired as a secretary in the Ministry of Foreign Affairs in 1954, then in the Ministry of Justice and the Police in 1957. Here she advanced in the ranks to assisting secretary in 1965 and deputy under-secretary of state in 1974. In 1969 she became the first leader of the newly established Film Council of Norway, a council tasked to "strengthen Norwegian film", both production and distribution. She chaired a commission that was tasked to revise Norwegian copyright law. Working from 1977 to 1988, the commission produced six Norwegian Official Reports.

Holmøy was a member of the Gullestad commission that in 1967 proposed changes in the probate act, and in 1972 she drafted the new inheritance act. She was also a member of a commission to revise the Norwegian marriage law, having revised Hans Lütken and Carl Platou's commentary on the marriage law (original 1918, second edition revised by Andreas Støylen in 1951, third edition revised by Vera Holmøy in 1971). Having then been a member of the commission that proposed a new marriage act, this became law in 1991 whereupon Holmøy wrote the new commentary together with Peter Lødrup.

Vera Holmøy was a Supreme Court Justice from 1976 to 2001; the third woman to be appointed after Lilly Bølviken (1968) and Elisabeth Schweigaard Selmer (1970). Among others, she was remembered for voting for the conviction of Jack Erik Kjuus.

Holmøy was decorated as a Commander of the Order of St. Olav in 1987. She had two sons and died at the age of 90.
