= Anders Omholt =

Norwegian physicist (1926–2017)

Anders Kristian Omholt (27 November 1926 – 30 April 2017) was a Norwegian physicist.

He was born in Aker. He was appointed professor at the University of Oslo from 1963 to 1971. As researcher he has contributed to the fields of Aurora Borealis and cosmic physics. He had a leading position at the Federation of Norwegian Industries from 1971 to 1977, and was director of the research council Norges almenvitenskapelige forskningsråd from 1978 to 1988. He was a fellow of the Norwegian Academy of Science and Letters.

He resided at Eiksmarka. He died at the age of 90.
