= Svein Valla =

Norwegian molecular biologist

Svein Valla (14 September 1948 – 13 September 2017) was a Norwegian molecular biologist.

He was a professor of microbial molecular biology at the Norwegian University of Science and Technology and fellow of the Norwegian Academy of Science and Letters.
