= Hroar Stange =

Norwegian politician

Hroar Stange (5 February 1921 – 24 June 2017) was a Norwegian physician and politician for the Conservative Party.

Stange practised as a physician in Kristiansand from 1952 to his retirement in 1992. He was active in the Norwegian Medical Association and the Norwegian Medical Society as regional branch leader, chaired the board of Vest-Agder Central Hospital and chaired the corporate council of Norsk Medisinaldepot.

Stange served in Kristiansand city council from 1963 to 1975. He served as a deputy representative to the Parliament of Norway from Vest-Agder during the terms 1969–1973 and 1973–1977. In total he met during 128 days of parliamentary session.
