= Willy Johan Fredriksen =

Norwegian diplomat

Willy Johan Fredriksen (27 February 1930 – 11 November 2017) was a Norwegian diplomat.

He was born in Narvik and took the cand.mag. degree. He started working for the Norwegian Ministry of Foreign Affairs in 1959, and after a period as regional adviser on Asian and Oceanian affairs he served as Norway's ambassador to Malaysia from 1983 to 1988 and Thailand from 1993 to 1997. In between he served as the fourth leader of the Committee on Human Rights from 1989 to 1990 and Inspector of the Foreign Service from 1990 to 1993.

Civic offices
Preceded by Ole Peter Kolby	Leader of the Committee on Human Rights; 1989–1990	Succeeded by Haakon Baardsøn Hjelde
