= Kristian Lund =

Norwegian politician (1932–2012)

Kristian Lund (12 February 1932 – 18 April 2012) was a Norwegian military officer, engineer and politician for the Conservative Party.

He was born in Furnes as a son of ship captain Arnulf Henrik Lund (1899–1964) and teacher Dagny Finstad (1897–1979). He finished his secondary education in 1950. After graduating from the military communications school Befalsskolen for Hærens Samband in 1951 he served as an officer here from 1952 to 1956 and 1958 to 1960, only interrupted by engineer studies. He then taught in electronics at Hærens Tekniske Fagskole from 1961 to 1981, and also took further education, among others in the United States. He was hired in Norsk Informasjonsteknologi in 1985, worked as sales director there from 1989 to 1995, and finally sales director in IBM Norway from 1995 to 1999.

He was a member of Lillehammer school board from 1968 to 1971, Lillehammer city council from 1971 to 1975 and 1994 to 1995, Oppland county council from 1971 to 1983 and the county school board for two years. He chaired his county party chapter from 1986 to 1988. He served as a deputy representative to the Parliament of Norway from Oppland during the term 1973–1977, was later elected to Parliament in 1981 and served through one term, as a member of the Standing Committee on Social Affairs.

He was a member of the local Vinmonopolet board from 1979 to 1983, and a supervisory council member of several regional banks. He was a lay judge in the District Court from 1972 to 2000, and deputy chairman in the Office of the Auditor General of Norway from 1986 to 1994. He was also active in Ja til EF and Norges Forsvarsforening.
