= Haagen Ringnes =

Norwegian journalist and writer (1928–2008)

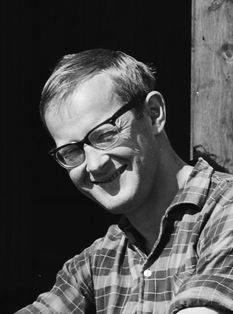
- Haagen Ringnes in 1965
- Born: 10 August 1928; Oslo, Norway
- Died: 23 April 2008 (aged 79)
- Occupations: Television journalist and non-fiction writer
- Relatives: Ellef Ringnes (grandfather)

Haagen Ringnes (10 August 1928 – 23 April 2008) was a Norwegian television journalist and non-fiction writer.

== Personal life ==
Ringnes was born in Oslo to pianist Inge Rolf Ringnes and Anne Johanne Prior Bergh. He was a grandson of brewer Ellef Ringnes. In 1960 he married social worker Betty Frisak.

== Career ==
He worked for the news agency Associated Press from 1956 to 1959, was a radio reporter for the Norwegian Broadcasting Corporation from 1959, and worked with television from 1962. He received the award Humanistprisen in 1995. Among his books are Tanker om tvil og tro from 1969, I skyggen av solkorset from 1981, and Samtaler med dronningen from 1997.
