= Hans Nylund =

Norwegian footballer (1939-2017)

Personal information
- Date of birth: 8 June 1939
- Date of death: 3 September 2017 (aged 78)

International career
Years	Team	Apps	(Gls)
1958	Norway	1	(0)

Hans Nylund (8 June 1939 – 3 September 2017) was a Norwegian footballer. He played in one match for the Norway national football team in 1958.
