= Halvdan Furholt =

Norwegian folk musician

- Born: 2 March 1931; Vegusdal Municipality, Norway
- Died: 30 April 2024 (aged 93)
- Occupations: Educator and folk musician
- Awards: King's Medal of Merit (2001)

Halvdan Furholt (2 March 1931 – 30 April 2024) was a Norwegian educator and folk musician.

== Personal life and education ==
Born in Vegusdal Municipality (now part of Birkenes Municipality) on 2 March 1931, Furholt was a schoolteacher by education. He worked at Songdalen secondary school from 1967 to 1995, including ten years as school principal.

He died in 2024, 93 years old, his death was announced in May 2024.

== Musical career ==
Playing the Hardanger fiddle, Furholt was a central musician in the folk music tradition in Agder. His albums include Agderkrullar from 1981 (in collaboration with his daughter Ragnhild Furholt and brother Otto Furholt), and Agderslåttar from 2002.

He was honorary member of Vest-Agder Mållag from 2001, and of the Norwegian National Association for Traditional Music and Dance since 2007. He was awarded the King's Medal of Merit in 2001, and the Vest-Agder cultural prize in 2012.
