= Ivar A. Mjør =

Norwegian odontologist

- Born: 18 September 1933; Norderhov, Norway
- Died: 6 January 2017 (aged 83); Asker
- Occupation: Odontologist

Ivar A. Mjør (18 September 1933 – 6 January 2017) was a Norwegian odontologist.

Mjør was born in Norderhov. He was professor in dentistry at the University of Oslo, director of Nordisk Institutt for odontologisk materialprøving, president of the International Association for Dental Research, and professor at the University of Florida College of Dentistry. He published more than 300 scientific articles during his career.
