= Audun Bakke =

Norwegian journalist, lecturer and organizational leader

- Born: 16 November 1933; Bergen, Norway
- Died: 26 March 2017 (aged 83); Oslo, Norway
- Occupation: Journalist

Audun Bakke (16 November 1933 – 26 March 2017) was a Norwegian journalist, lecturer and organizational leader.

Bakke was born in Bergen in west Norway. He studied journalism at the Aarhus University (Denmark), and political science and sociology at the University of Oslo. He was journalist for the newspapers Os- og Fanaposten, Hordaland and Bergens Tidende. He lectured at Norsk journalistskole from 1972 to 1978, served as secretary-general for the Association of Norwegian Editors from 1979 to 1983, and was rector at Nordisk Journalistcenter in Aarhus from 1989 to 1987. His publications include Analytisk journalistikk from 1977, and Kommunaljournalistikk from 1983.
