= Knut Myhre =

Norwegian politician

Knut Myhre (30 November 1931 – 2003) was a Norwegian politician for the Liberal Party.

He served as a deputy representative to the Norwegian Parliament from Vest-Agder during the term 1969–1973.
