= Aline Nistad =

Norwegian musician and music educator

Aline Nistad (August 24, 1954 – September 23, 2017) was a Norwegian trombonist and music educator. As a female trombonist, she was considered a pioneer in her field.

She was born in Oslo and grew up in Aurskog-Høland. Nistad was taught to play piano at home by her mother but the trombone became her instrument of choice at school. She studied at the Østlandets Musikkonservatorium and the Guildhall School of Music and Drama in London. In 1979, she joined the Oslo Philharmonic Orchestra, where she was principal trombone. From 1986 to 1989, Nistad served as chairman for the orchestra. She was a member of the Oslo Sinfonietta, a contemporary classical music ensemble. Nistad retired from the Oslo Philharmonic Orchestra in August 2016. She taught trombone and chamber music at the Norwegian Academy of Music. Nistad also held master classes and was a guest instructor in Norway and internationally, particularly in the United Kingdom.

She died of cancer at the age of 63.
