= Per Kleiva =

Norwegian Painter

- Born: 1 April 1933; Torsken, Norway
- Died: 17 September 2017 (aged 84)
- Occupations: Painter and graphic artist

Per Kleiva (1 April 1933 – 17 September 2017) was a Norwegian painter and graphic artist.

== Biography ==
Kleiva was born on 1 April 1933 in Torsken Municipality to schoolteacher Ivar Kleiva (1903–1998) and Frida Pettersen (1905–1963). He was married to Ida Drage. He grew up in Troms, Sunnmøre, and Gulen in Sogn. He took courses at Bergen Academy of Art and Design. In 1959 he studied under Niels Lergaard at the Royal Danish Academy of Fine Arts in Copenhagen, and he also studied at the Academy of Fine Arts in Florence and the Royal Swedish Academy of Fine Arts in Stockholm. Kleiva studied under Per Krohg at the Norwegian National Academy of Fine Arts in the years 1955 to 1957.

From 1961 to 1965 he was an assistant to visual artist Sigurd Winge (1909–1970). He made his debut at the Autumn Exhibition at Oslo in 1963. From 1987 to 1993 he was appointed professor at the Norwegian National Academy of Fine Arts.

His works are represented in the National Museum of Art, Architecture and Design, the Henie Onstad Art Center and the Nordnorsk Kunstmuseum.

== Other sources ==
- Renberg, Ulf (1986) Per Kleiva (Oslo: Labyrinth Press) ISBN 8273930009
