= Trygve Berge =

Norwegian alpine skier (1932–2026)

Personal information
- Nationality: Norwegian/American
- Born: 19 April 1932 Voss, Norway
- Died: 2 April 2026 (aged 93)
- Occupation: ski instructor

Sport
- Country: Norway
- Sport: Alpine skiing

Trygve Berge (19 April 1932 – 2 April 2026) was a Norwegian alpine skier.

== Biography ==
Berge was born in Voss Municipality on 19 April 1932, and grew up on the farm Brekke in Gullfjordungen in Voss.

He participated at the 1956 Winter Olympics in Cortina d'Ampezzo, where he competed in downhill. He became Norwegian champion in downhill in 1956.

In 1958 he moved to the United States, working as a professional ski instructor, and eventually became a central person in establishing the Breckenridge Ski Resort in the Rocky Mountains.

Berge died on 2 April 2026, at the age of 93.
