= Karin Sundbye =

Norwegian textile artist (1928–2024)

- Born: 12 May 1928; Oslo, Norway
- Died: 15 September 2024 (aged 96)
- Education: Norwegian National Academy of Craft and Art Industry
- Occupation: Textile artist
- Spouse: Skule Waksvik (m. 1953–1958)

Karin Sundbye (12 May 1928 – 15 September 2024) was a Norwegian textile artist.

== Personal life ==
Sundby was born in Oslo on 12 May 1928, a daughter of tanner and merchant Alf Sundbye and Ragna Halvorsen.

From 1953 to 1958 she was married to sculptor Skule Waksvik.

== Career ==
Sundbye studied at the Norwegian National Academy of Craft and Art Industry from 1949 to 1954, and at the Statens lærerskole i forming Notodden from 1958 to 1959.

Making her debut as a craft artist in 1959, she worked on various techniques and eventually fokused mostly on weaving. She is represented at the National Museum of Norway, as well as the Nordenfjeldske Kunstindustrimuseum and the West Norway Museum of Decorative Art. She delivered works to various Norwegian public institutions and companies.

Sundbye died on 15 September 2024, at the age of 96.
