= Karstein Hansen =

Norwegian politician (born 1932)

Karstein Hansen (born 19 June 1932) is a Norwegian politician for the Progress Party. He was a deputy representative to the Norwegian Parliament from Nordland during the terms 1997–2001 and 2001–2005. In total, he sat for 53 days of parliamentary session.
