= Magne Malmanger =

Norwegian art historian

Magne Malmanger (10 May 1932 – 12 December 2023) was a Norwegian art historian.

He was born in Bergen and took the mag.art. degree at the University of Oslo in 1958 with the thesis The Intention of Constable. He was also an art critic in Dagbladet from 1962 to 1968, and lecturer at the University of Oslo from 1967 to 1968 before being hired as an associate professor at the Norwegian Institute in Rome in 1968. In 1974 he was hired as head curator at the National Gallery of Norway. His doctoral thesis Norsk malerkunst. Fra klassisisme til tidlig realisme was published in 1981. From 1986 he held a professorship of art history at the University of Oslo, serving as managing director of the Norwegian Institute in Rome from 1990 to 1996. He was inducted into the Norwegian Academy of Science and Letters in 1991.
