= Tideman =

Tideman is a surname. Notable people with the surname include:

- Bertha Tideman-Wijers (1887-1976), Dutch composer
- Bruno Tideman (1834-1883), Dutch naval engineer
- Magnus Tideman (born 1963), former professional tennis player from Sweden
- Nicolaus Tideman (born 1943), Professor of Economics at Virginia Polytechnic Institute and State University
- Philip Tideman (1657–1705), Dutch Golden Age painter
- Robert Tideman of Winchcombe (died 1401), medieval Bishop of Llandaff and Bishop of Worcester

== See also ==
- Tideman Johnson Natural Area, city park of about 7.7 acres (3.1 ha) in southeast Portland, in the U.S. state of Oregon
