= Kolbjørn Skaare =

Norwegian numismatist

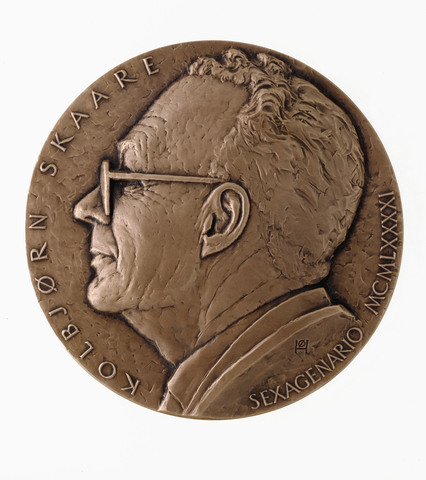
- Memorial medal with Kolbjørn Skaare, designed by engraver Øivind Hansen
- Born: 6 April 1931; Strinda Municipality, Norway
- Died: 3 June 2017 (aged 86)
- Education: University of Oslo
- Occupation: Numismatist
- Awards: King's Medal of Merit (1995)

Kolbjørn Skaare (6 April 1931 – 3 June 2017) was a Norwegian numismatist.

== Early and personal life ==
Skaare was born on 6 April 1931 in Strinda Municipality (in current Trondheim Municipality) to Sevald Skaare and Thora Rogne, and grew up in Vang Municipality, where his father was assigned with the agricultural research farm of Vidarshov. He married Marit Olafsdatter Bjørnstad in 1959. He died in Oslo on 3 June 2017.

== Career ==
After finishing his secondary education at Hamar Cathedral School, Skaare studied history, Latin and Greek language at the University of Oslo. He was assigned with the Coin Cabinet (Myntkabinettet) from 1954, as conservator from 1958. He graduated as dr.philos. in 1976 with the thesis Coins and Coinage in Viking-Age Norway, and was appointed professor in numismatics at the University of Oslo in 1985. From 1979 to 1986 he was secretary for the Commission internationale de numismatique, and served as president of the society from 1986 to 1991. He was a fellow of the Norwegian Academy of Science and Letters, where he also was a board member and served as preses. Among his research results is a re-evaluation of the chronology of Norwegian middle age coins. He contributed to the research publication series Nordisk Numismatisk Årsskrift and elsewhere, and to popularization through books and newspaper columns. His books include the two-volume Norges mynthistorie from 1995, Pengesedler i Norge (1996), Bysantinske mynter (1998), and Fra Ptolemaios den første til Harald den femte. Herskerbilder på mynt (1998).

He was awarded the King's Medal of Merit in gold in 1995.
