= Tore Bøgh =

Norwegian politician (1924–2017)

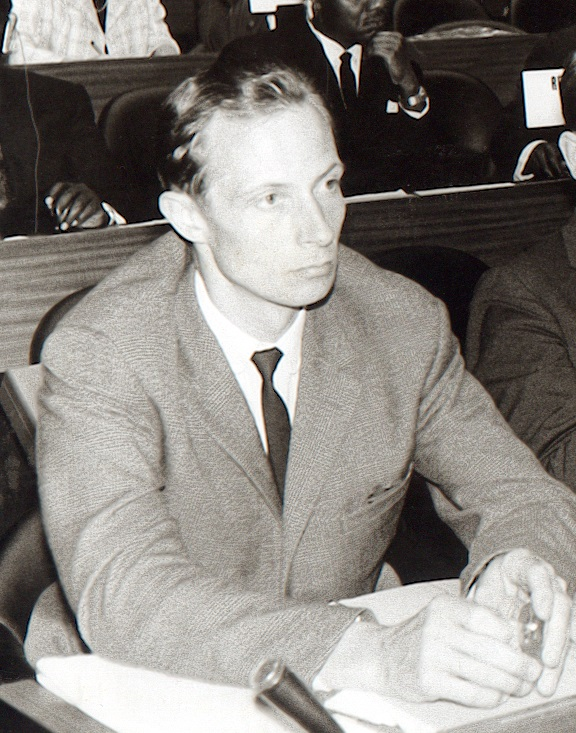

Tore Bøgh (2 April 1924 – 2 August 2017) was a Norwegian civil servant and diplomat.

He was born in Kristiansand and was hired in the Ministry of Foreign Affairs in 1950. He became deputy under-secretary of state there in 1976 before serving as Norway's ambassador to Yugoslavia from 1980 to 1988 and to Portugal from 1988 to 1992.
