= Bjørn Slettan =

Norwegian historian (1931–2014)

Bjørn Slettan (11 October 1931 – 23 May 2014) was a Norwegian historian. He comes from Holum Municipality, Norway. He first took a teacher's education in Kristiansand, and later the cand.philol. degree in history at the University of Oslo. He worked as a teacher for many years, but in 1991 he was appointed as an associate professor at Agder University College, as the first faculty member in history at that institution. He retired in 1998. His main work was the third volume of the history of the town of Mandal, published in 2006. Slettan died on 23 May 2014, at the age of 82.
