= Skule Waksvik =

Norwegian sculptor (1927–2018)

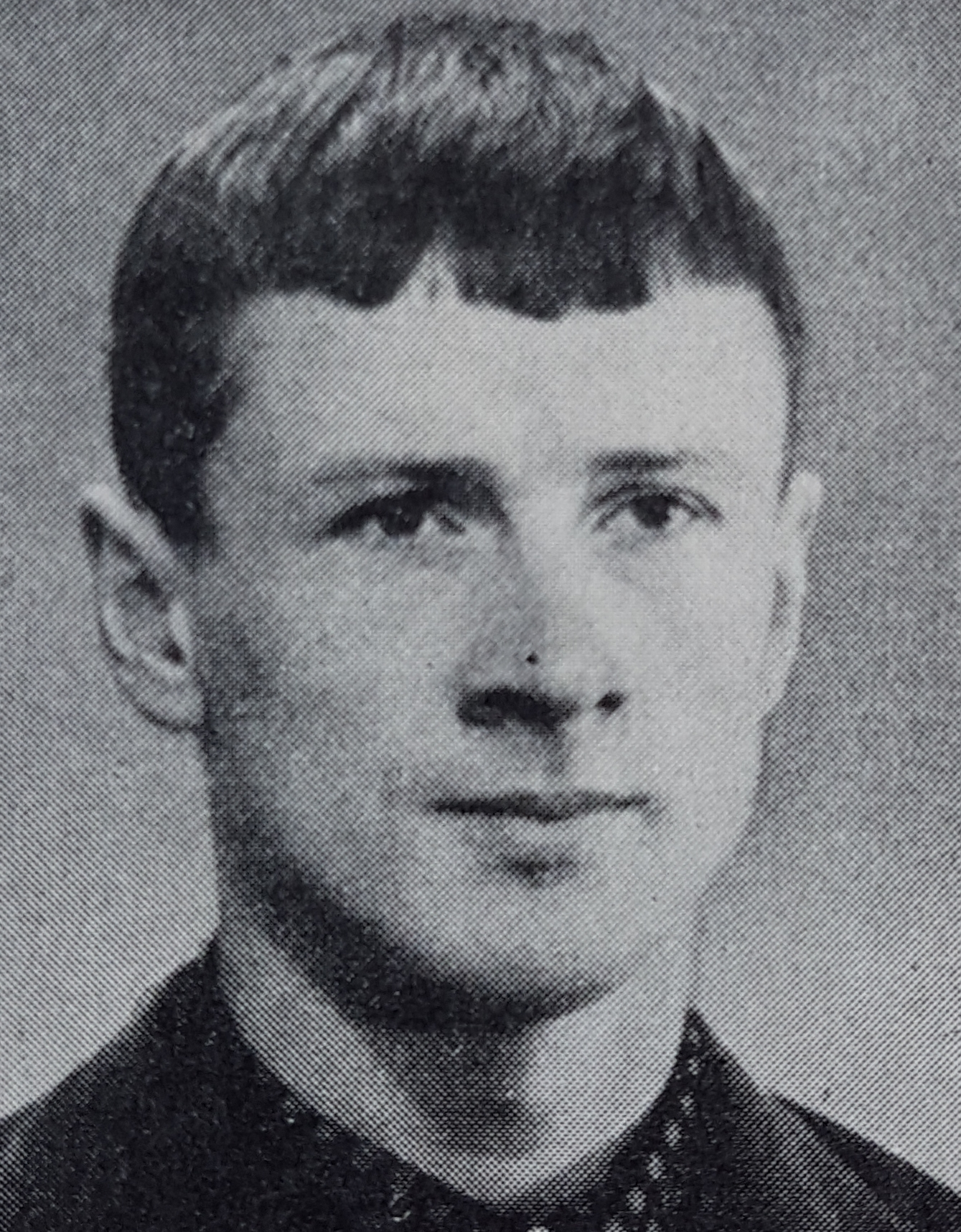
- Skule Waksvik.
- Born: 22 December 1927; Strinda Municipality, Norway
- Died: 7 February 2018 (aged 90)
- Occupation: sculptor

Skule Waksvik (22 December 1927 – 7 February 2018) was a Norwegian sculptor.

== Biography ==
Waksvik was born in Strinda Municipality to painter Bjarne Sigfred Waksvik and Gudrun Bøe. He was married three times, first to textile artist Karin Sundbye, then to Aasa Lageraaen, and finally to Cathrine Stang.

Waksvik is particularly known for his animal sculptures, such as Hønefontenen at the Storting, Sjøløve at the National Gallery of Norway, Fontene med sjøløver in Haugesund, Fire elger in Elverum, and Avlsokse in Hamar. He has also portrayed Petter Dass and the fictional Ann-Magritt from Johan Falkberget's books.
