= Arne Barhaugen =

Norwegian Nordic combined skier

Arne Barhaugen (January 11, 1932 – February 10, 2008) was a Norwegian Nordic combined skier who competed in the 1950s and 1960s. He finished fifth in the Nordic combined event at the 1956 Winter Olympics in Cortina d'Ampezzo and sixth in the same event at the 1964 Winter Olympics in Innsbruck. He was born and died in Oslo.
