= Ole Fyrand =

Norwegian physician

Ole Lennart Fyrand (4 April 1937 – 30 December 2017) was a Norwegian physician.

He was born in Drammen. A professor of medicine at the University of Oslo from 1978, he was a recognized specialist in dermatology and venereology from the year before.
