= Gunnar Løvhøiden =

Norwegian nuclear physicist

Gunnar Løvhøiden (12 March 1938–7 February 2017) was a Norwegian nuclear physicist from Oslo.

Løvhøiden graduated from the University of Oslo in 1966 and started his career as a teacher at Tyrifjord høyere skole. Already the year after he returned to the university as an assistant for Per Olav Tjøm who was working in close collaboration with the Niels Bohr Institute in Copenhagen, Denmark. The work Løvhøiden made in Copenhagen became the foundation for his doctoral thesis that he defended in 1972. Løvhøiden was immediately offered a post doc. position at McMaster University in Canada.

He was appointed as a docent at the University of Bergen in November 1972. In the period 1973–1981 Løvhøiden participated in experiments at McMaster University, Los Alamos National Laboratory, Niels Bohr Institute and at the Kernfysisch Versneller Instituut in Groningen. He later became professor, and then professor at the University of Oslo in 1992. He was a fellow of the Norwegian Academy of Science and Letters, president of the Norwegian Physical Society and 2005 recipient of the Birkeland Award.
