= Svennik Høyer =

Norwegian political scientist

- Born: 3 August 1931; Bærum, Norway
- Died: 8 January 2017 (aged 85); Oslo, Norway
- Education: University of Oslo
- Occupation: Political scientist
- Employer: University of Oslo

Svennik Høyer (3 August 1931 – 8 January 2017) was a Norwegian political scientist.

He was born in Bærum. He graduated as cand.mag. in political science from the University of Oslo in 1959, and as dr.philos. in 1974. In 1985 he was appointed professor at the Institute for media research at the University of Oslo. His research interests included aspects such as the structural development of the press, interaction between press and politics, development of the journalist profession and journalism, and intersections between technology and society.
