= Kjell Raaheim =

Norwegian psychologist

Kjell Raaheim (8 October 1930 – 23 April 2017) was a Norwegian psychologist.

He hailed from Bergen and took his degree at the University of Oslo. He was hired as the first psychologist at the University of Bergen, originally working at the Institute of Philosophy. He was a professor of cognitive psychology at the University of Bergen from 1969 to 1994, and became known for both lectures, academic writing, popular writing, textbooks as well as founding the small publishing house Sigma in 1980. He was a member of the Norwegian Academy of Science and Letters.
