= Sven Ivar Dysthe =

Norwegian furniture designer (1931–2020)

- Born: 25 August 1931; Oslo, Norway
- Died: 1 March 2020 (aged 88)
- Occupation: Furniture designer

Sven Ivar Dysthe (25 August 1931 – 1 March 2020) was a Norwegian furniture designer born in Oslo, Norway. Among his designs is the armchair 1001 from 1960, and the chair Laminette from 1964. He was awarded Norsk Form's Jakob Award in 1986.

== Personal life ==
Dysthe was born in Oslo on 25 August 1931, a son of Sven Rachlew Dysthe and Ingrid Mathilde Whist. In 1957 he married Trinelise Hauan, an interior architect and journalist.
