= Ingrid Schjelderup (politician) =

Norwegian politician (1932–2022)

Ingrid Schjelderup (11 May 1932 – 13 December 2022) was a Norwegian politician for the Centre Party.

Schjelderup served as a deputy representative to the Norwegian Parliament from Rogaland during the terms 1977–1981 and 1981–1985. In total she met during 5 days of parliamentary session.
