= Kristian Tambs =

Norwegian psychologist (1951–2017)

Kristian Tambs (25 May 1951 – 13 June 2017) was a Norwegian psychologist.

He took the doctorate at the University of Oslo in 1989, was then a postdoc fellow at the Virginia Commonwealth University until 1991, when he was hired at the Norwegian Institute of Public Health. He was a member of the Norwegian Academy of Science and Letters.
