= Eurotrac =

European research programme

EUROTRAC (European Experiment on Transportation and Transformation of Environmentally Relevant Trace Constituents) was a joint European scientific research programme within the Eureka Framework.

EUROTRAC was accepted as a Eureka project at the second Eureka Ministerial Conference held in Hannover (Germany) in November 1985. After a two-year definition phase, the work started in January 1988 and ended in 1995. At the peak of the programme, it included more than 250 research groups from 24 European countries and its budget exceeded 16 million ECU per year (equivalent to approx. 16 million euros).

== Objectives and focus areas ==
The objectives of Eurotrac were to:

- Increase the basic knowledge in atmospheric science;
- Promote the technological development of sensitive, specific, and fast response instruments for environmental research and monitoring;
- Improve the scientific basis for future political decisions on environmental management in European countries.

EUROTRAC studied the impact of human activities on the troposphere over Europe, focusing on:

- The chemistry and transport of photo-oxidants (especially ozone) in the troposphere
- The processes leading to the formation of acidity in the atmosphere
- The uptake and release of atmospheric trace substances by the biosphere.

EUROTRAC was an interdisciplinary programme involving field experiments and campaigns, laboratory studies, comprehensive model developments and simulations, emission estimation, studies of biosphere/atmosphere exchange and the development of advanced instruments for laboratory and field measurements.

=== Projects and outcome ===
Fourteen projects were established as part of the EUROTRAC programme. Under each project, several subprojects and studies were carried out. Numerous articles and findings resulting from numerous studies have been presented at symposiums held during and after the EUROTRAC period. These articles can be found on websites like Springer, Fraunhofer Gesellschaft, and ResearchGate. The 14 EUROTRAC projects were:

Cloud studies:

- ACE: Acidity in Cloud Experiments
- GCE: Ground Based Cloud Experiment

Field measurements:

- ALPTRAC: High Alpine Air and Snow Chemistry
- TOR: Tropospheric Ozone Research
- TRACT: Transport of Pollutants over Complex Terrain

Biosphere / Atmosphere exchange:

- ASE: Air-Sea Exchange
- BIATEX: Biosphere-Atmosphere exchange of pollutants and Trace substances

Laboratory studies:

- HALIPP: Heterogeneous and Liquid Phase Processes
- LACTOZ: Laboratory Studies of Chemistry Related to Tropospheric Ozone

Model development:

- EUMAC: European Modelling of Atmospheric Constituents
- GLOMAC: Global Modelling of Atmospheric Chemistry

Instrument Development:

- JETDLAG: Joint European Development of Tunable Diode Laser Absorption Spectroscopy for Measurement of Atmospheric Trace Gases
- TESLAS: Tropospheric Environmental Studies by Laser Sounding
- TOPAS: Tropospheric Optical Absorption Spectroscopy

== Funding and cooperation ==
EUROTRAC was a science-driven, "bottom-up" research programme, where the scientist involved in the programme proposed research projects. The scientist had to seek funding themselves, primarily through their national funding sources. In some cases also the European Commission contributed to the funding.

In order to become a EUROTRAC-project, the project proposals had to be evaluated by the Scientific Steering Committee (SSC) and finally approved by the International Executive Committee (IEC).

== Organisation ==
EUROTRAC was headed by an International Executive Committee (IEC). The IEC consisted of one representative from each member country who were responsible for approving the subproject proposals and appointed members to the Scientific Steering Committee (SSC). The SSC reviewed the subproject proposals as well as the progress and results of the individual subprojects. The International Scientific Secretariat (ISS) coordinated the EUROTRAC project. The ISS was operated by Fraunhofer Institute for Atmospheric Research (Fraunhofer Institut für Atmosphärische Umweltforschung - IFU), located in Garmisch-Partenkirchen, Germany.

== Second phase ==
After ending the first phase of EUROTRAC (1988–1995, described above), EUROTRAC-2 was initiated in 1996. During the second phase, 25 countries and more than 300 research groups were involved.
