= Anders Myklebust =

Norwegian politician (1928–2020)

Anders Myklebust (29 February 1928 – 2 September 2020) was a Norwegian politician for the Christian Democratic Party.

Myklebust served as a deputy representative to the Norwegian Parliament from Sogn og Fjordane during the term 1969–1973. In total he met during 26 days of parliamentary session.
