= Kommunal Rapport =

Norwegian newspaper

Kommunal Rapport (lit. 'Municipal Report') is a Norwegian daily news web site and weekly newspaper which covers municipal affairs.

The newspaper was established in 1987. In 2011, the media company established an independent subscription based, digital publication at kommunal-rapport.no. The weekly is issued out of Vika, Oslo by Kommunal Rapport AS (limited company), which is owned by the Norwegian Association of Local and Regional Authorities. Its editor-in-chief since March 2008 is Britt Sofie Hestvik. Kommunal Rapport is a member of The Specialized Press Association in Norway. The newspapers main readers are local politicians and executive officers of the local municipalities and counties of Norway. The newspaper has won several awards for its journalism in Norway. Most notably in 2016, the journalist Vegard Venli was awarded Den store journalistprisen (The Great Journalism Prize) for gaining the public access to the registry of shareholders in limited companies in Norway. In 2016, the turnover was app. 30 mill NOK. As of January 2017, the media company employed 18 people, with 14 working on the editorial content.
