= Martin Mork =

Norwegian oceanographer and professor

Martin Trygve Mork (20 May 1933 – 19 March 2017) was a Norwegian oceanographer.

He was born in Kristiansund. He became a professor of theoretical oceanography at the University of Bergen in 1972 and a fellow of the Norwegian Academy of Science and Letters in 1974.
