= William Duborgh Jensen =

Norwegian fashion and costume designer

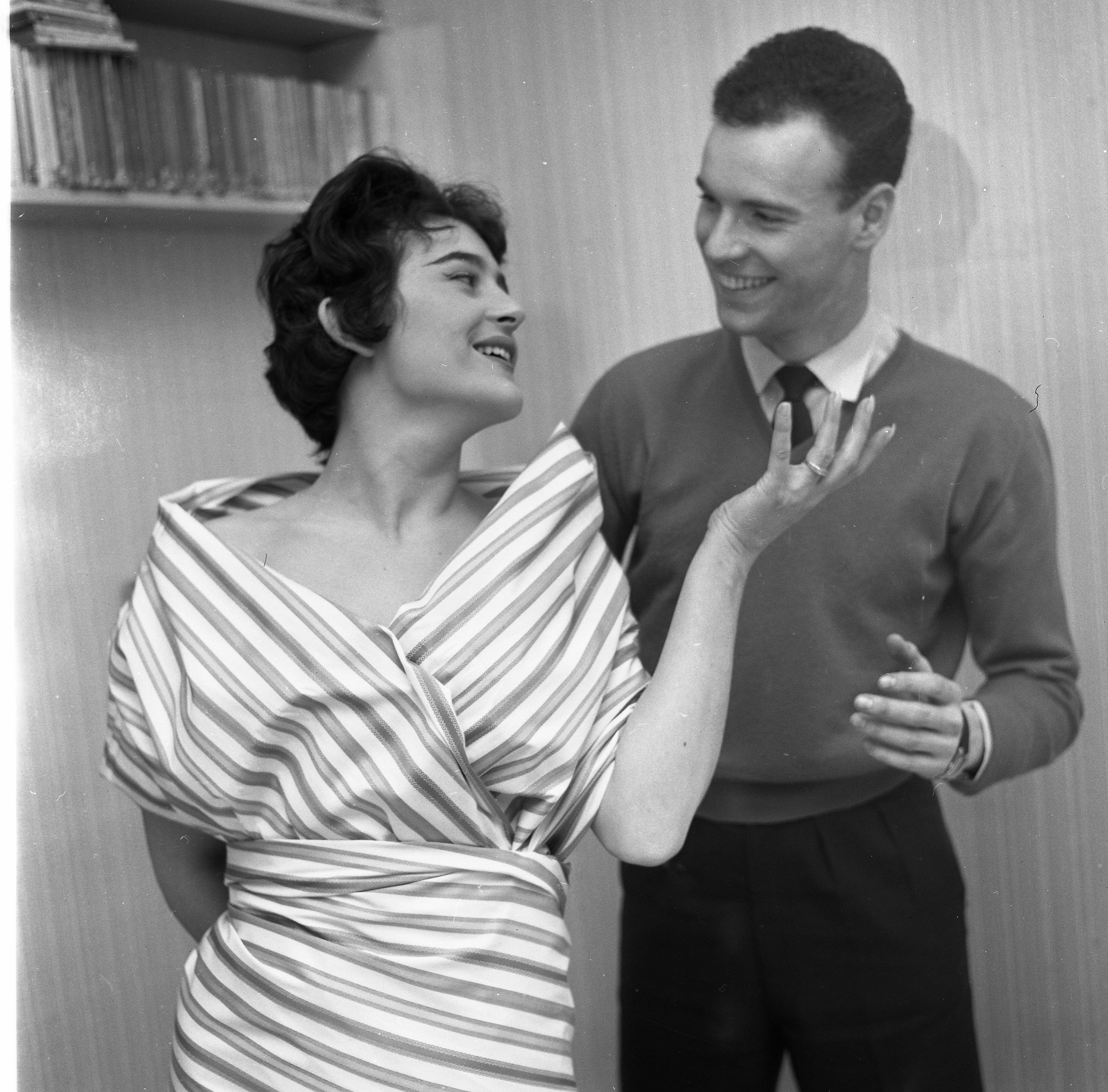
William Duborgh Jensen with a model in 1958.

William Duborgh Jensen (10 May 1935 – 24 May 2017) was a Norwegian fashion and costume designer.

Jensen was first known as a fashion designer; he was Norway's first "haute couturier" with his own collection in 1958. He later worked in television and film as a costume designer.

Jensen was appointed as a Knight, First Class of the Order of St. Olav in 2006 for his efforts in fashion design. He died in 2017, at the age of 82.
