= Børt-Erik Thoresen =

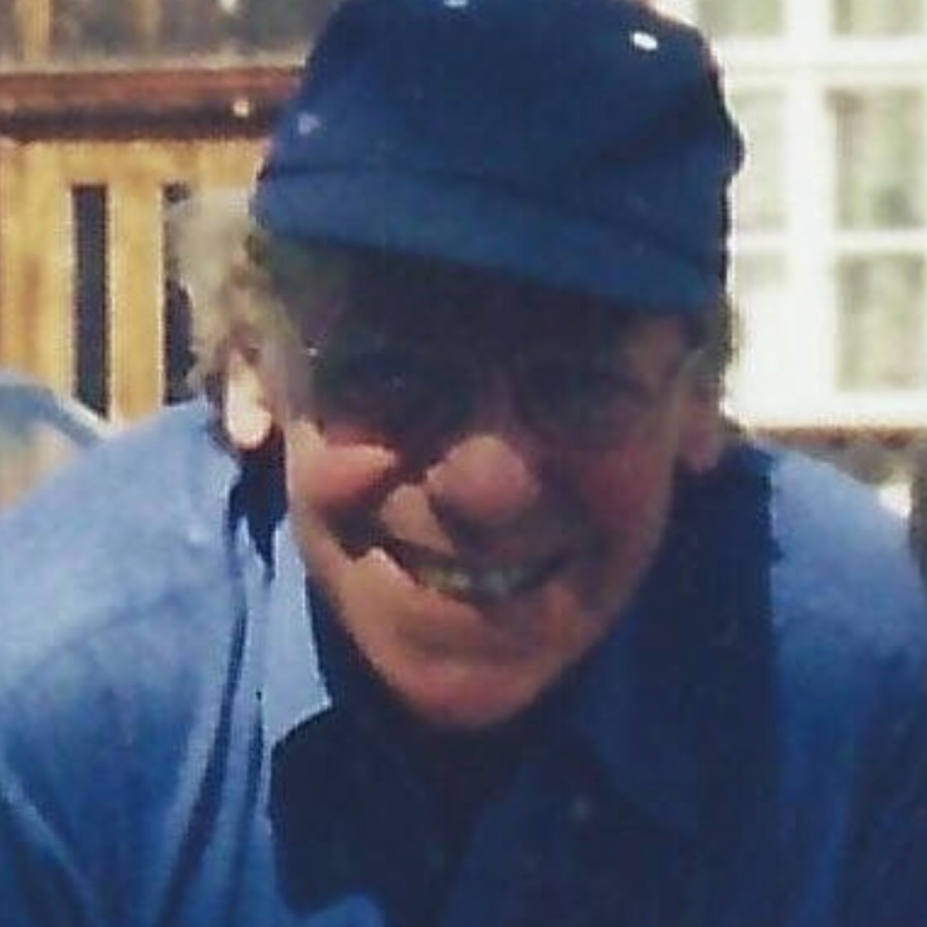

Børt-Erik Thoresen (5 May 1932 – 10 April 2011) was a Norwegian television host and folk singer.

He hosted musical programmes for the Norwegian Broadcasting Corporation from 1968 to the late 1980s. He also released several records.

Thoresen was born in Dombås. He was the brother of Åse Thoresen, and was married to classical music and opera singer Aase Nordmo Løvberg.
