= Hans Brattrud =

Norwegian furniture designer and architect

- Born: 25 September 1933; Dokka, Norway
- Died: 16 March 2017 (aged 83)
- Occupation(s): Furniture designer Architect
- Awards: King's Medal of Merit

Hans Brattrud (25 September 1933 – 16 March 2017) was a Norwegian furniture designer and architect.

He was born in Dokka, and educated at the Norwegian National Academy of Craft and Art Industry. His designs include the chair Scandia Jr., Grorudstolen, the table Fagott, and the armchair Comet. From 1964 he started practicing as architect, and was eventually manager of the prefabricated house company Bra-bo Elementbygg. He was awarded Merket for God Design for his furniture design in 1967, and received the King's Medal of Merit in gold in 2008.
