= Sigurd B. Hennum =

Norwegian journalist and editor

Sigurd Bernhard Hennum
- Born: 10 December 1930
- Died: 27 April 2017 (aged 86)
- Education: Norwegian Journalist Academy, Nansen School
- Alma mater: University of Oslo
- Occupations: Journalist, Editor
- Years active: 1951–1995
- Employer: Aftenposten

Sigurd Bernhard Hennum (10 December 1930 – 27 April 2017) was a Norwegian journalist and editor.

He grew up in Ullevål Hageby. After finishing his secondary education he enrolled at the University of Oslo without taking a degree. He instead graduated from the Norwegian Journalist Academy in 1954 and the Nansen School in 1955. While studying he worked for Morgenbladet from 1951 to 1953, but spent his career in Aftenposten from 1955 to 1995. Most notably he was editor-in-chief of the newspaper's magazine A-magasinet from 1963 to 1978.

He was a founder of the crime writers' club Riverton Club in 1972, and became an honorary member in 1997. Also venturing into politics, he was elected to Bærum municipal council in 1963 and 1967. He also served on Bærum's cultural committee from 1968 to 1978, during which time the Henie Onstad Art Museum was established in the municipality.

Hennum resided with his family in Bærum from 1960 until moving to Billingstad in 2006. He died 80 years old in 2017.
