= Leif Raa =

Norwegian illustrator and cartoonist (1931–2003)

- Born: 19 May 1931
- Died: 27 January 2003 (aged 71)
- Education: Bergen National Academy of the Arts
- Occupations: illustrator and cartoonist

Leif Raa (19 May 1931 – 27 January 2003) was a Norwegian illustrator and cartoonist. He studied at the Bergen National Academy of the Arts, and from 1956 to 1998 he worked as illustrator for the newspaper Bergens Tidende. He started drawing commercials, and from 1962 he was freelancer for the editorial staff until 1975, when he was appointed a permanent position with the newspaper. His cartoons could be either editorial comments or news comments, and he also reported from several travels in European countries. In addition to the newspaper works he also illustrated books and designed book covers.
