= Børre Olsen =

Norwegian jewel designer

Børre Olsen (9 January 1964 – 12 November 2017) was a Norwegian jewel designer.

His brand SO-B was worn by Rihanna and Lady Gaga among others. He died in November 2017 from brain cancer, having been diagnosed the same year and spent the remainder of his life as a fundraiser in the Project Fuck Cancer.
