= Runa Førde =

Norwegian painter, illustrator and graphic artist

- Born: 24 February 1933; Oslo, Norway
- Died: 28 July 2017 (aged 84)
- Education: Norwegian National Academy of Craft and Art Industry; Norwegian National Academy of Fine Arts
- Occupations: painter, illustrator and graphic artist
- Awards: Ministry of Culture's prize for"best children's book illustrations".

Runa Førde (24 February 1933 – 28 July 2017) was a Norwegian painter, illustrator and graphic artist.

She was born in Oslo to Inger Else Johanne Steenberg and Sverre Førde. She studied at the Norwegian National Academy of Craft and Art Industry and at the Norwegian National Academy of Fine Arts. She has illustrated several children's books and readers for elementary school. She is represented at the National Gallery of Norway, Riksgalleriet, the National Gallery of Denmark, and in galleries in Beijing and the Faroe Islands.
