= Academic grading in Norway =

Universities and university colleges normally use the ECTS grading scale. Most institutions have official "explanations" of the grades equivalent to the following:

Symbol	Description	General, qualitative description of valuation criteria
A	Excellent	An excellent performance, clearly outstanding. The candidate demonstrates excellent judgement and a high degree of independent thinking.
B	Very good	A very good performance. The candidate demonstrates sound judgement and a very good degree of independent thinking.
C	Good	A good performance in most areas. The candidate demonstrates a reasonable degree of judgement and independent thinking in the most important areas.
D	Satisfactory	A satisfactory performance, but with significant shortcomings. The candidate demonstrates a limited degree of judgement and independent thinking.
E	Sufficient	A performance that meets the minimum criteria, but no more. The candidate demonstrates a very limited degree of judgement and independent thinking.
F	Fail	A performance that does not meet the minimum academic criteria. The candidate demonstrates an absence of both judgement and independent thinking.

In some subjects the grades Passed/Not passed and Recognized/Not recognized are used.

The formerly most common system of grades used at university level was based on a scale running from 1.0 (highest) through 6.0 (lowest), 4.0 being the lowest passing grade. Except from in natural sciences and mathematics, the grades from 1.0 to 1.5 were rarely used, de facto reducing the grade range from 1.6 to 6.0 outside these fields. Medicine and law studies used a different grading system. The way the ECTS grading scale was introduced implies that students who had started their studies while the old system still was in effect will graduate with transcripts containing grades from both systems (i.e., both numbers and letters).

== Secondary school and upper secondary school ==
Lower levels of education (secondary school and upper secondary school) use a scale running from 1 to 6, with 6 being the highest. In all subjects, students receive a grade based on the teacher's final assessment ("standpunktkarakter"). In addition students sit exams in a selection of subjects.

In the lower secondary school there are no failing grades and a diploma is awarded upon graduation regardless of the grades. In upper secondary school, a grade of 2 or better is required to pass a subject. A subject is passed if the exam is passed, even if the teacher's assessment resulted in a failing grade.

The grading scale is as follows:

- 6 Outstanding competence in the subject
- 5 Very good competence in the subject
- 4 Good competence in the subject
- 3 Fairly good competence in the subject
- 2 Low level of competence in the subject
- 1 Very low level of competence in the subject

For non-final tests and mid-term evaluations, grades are often postfixed with + or − (except 6+ and 1−), and it is also common to use grades such as 5/6 or 4/3 indicating borderline grades. This practice is unofficial. Finals, and the final grades for each subject, may only be graded with whole numbers.

Vocational education usually ends with a trade test (fagprøve) or journeyman test (svenneprøve) after a period of apprenticeship. The grading scale is:

- Passed very well
- Passed
- Not passed

In the 2017–18 school year, 29% percent test takers achieved "passed very well", while 64% achieved "passed".

In addition, grades are given for conduct, in particular tidiness and behavior. This scale runs:

- G (God or Good)
- Ng (Nokså god or Fairly good)
- Lg (Lite god or Not good)

"G" represents the normal good conduct. The "Ng" grade indicates clear deviations from normal good conduct, while the "Lg" grade are for extraordinary cases with major deviations. In some cases the scale is extended with + or - suffixes, most commonly "G-", to inform a student of a borderline status.
