= Carl-Fredrik Michelet Tidemann =

Norwegian physician and military officer

- Born: 12 April 1932; Oslo, Norway
- Died: 21 January 2017 (aged 84)
- Occupation: Physician

Carl-Fredrik Michelet Tidemann (12 April 1932 – 21 January 2017) was a Norwegian physician and military officer.

He was born in Oslo, and was a surgeon in the Norwegian Army from 1975. Tidemann was promoted to Major General in the Army and Surgeon General and head of the Norwegian Defence Medical Service (Forsvarets sanitet) from 1984 to 1992. He later chaired the Norwegian Red Cross' Hospital in Oslo.
