= Sølvi Sogner =

Norwegian historian

- Born: 15 March 1932; Trondheim, Norway
- Died: 23 March 2017 (aged 85); Oslo, Norway
- Occupations: University Professor; Historian
- Relatives: Bjørn Sogner (1930–1985)

Sølvi Sogner (15 March 1932 – 23 March 2017) was a Norwegian historian. She was a professor at the University of Oslo from 1988 to 2002.

== Biography ==
Sogner was born in Trondheim, Norway. She was the daughter of Trygve Bauge (1896-1978) and Sidsel Schulz (1904–97). In 1959, she married fellow historian Bjørn Sogner (1930–1985).

From 1957–1964, she was a scientific assistant at the Norwegian Institute of Local History (Norsk lokalhistorisk institutt). Sogner became university lecturer in 1975 and dr.philos. in 1976. She became an associate professor at the University of Oslo in 1974 and a professor from 1988. She was a member of the Norwegian Academy of Sciences from 1994 and head of the International Commission for Historical Demographic Research (ICHD). She was a board member of the Norwegian Institute of Local History (1978-1981) and chairman (1982-1993).

Much of her research dealt with the subject of demographics. Among her publications were Ung i Europa. Norsk ungdom over Nordsjøen til Nederland i tidlig nytid (1994) and Og skuta lå i Amsterdam-: et glemt norsk innvandrersamfunn i Amsterdam 1621-1720 (2012) in which she researched 17th century Norwegian immigration to Amsterdam and to the Netherlands. She wrote about the period 1500–1750 in Cappelens kvinnehistorie (1992), and volume 6 ("Krig og fred 1660–1780") in Aschehougs Norgeshistorie (1996).

== Selected works ==
- Folkevekst og flytting (1979)
- Bot eller bryllup with Jørgen Eliassen (1981)
- Far sjøl i stua og familien hans (1990)
