= Arild Andresen (sportsman) =

Norwegian footballer and ice hockey player (1928-2008)

Personal information
- Full name: Arild Inge Andresen
- Date of birth: 1 December 1928
- Place of birth: Oslo, Norway
- Date of death: 27 December 2008 (aged 80)
- Place of death: Oslo, Norway
- Position: Goalkeeper

Senior career*
Years	Team	Apps	(Gls)
1948–1954	Vålerenga		

International career
1950	Norway	1	(0)
- * Club domestic league appearances and goals

Arild Inge Andresen (1 December 1928 – 27 December 2008) was a Norwegian football and ice hockey player who played for Vålerenga in both sports.

For the football team, he made his debut in 1948, in the inaugural season of the Norwegian Main League. He was capped once for Norway; in 1950, against Sweden. He retired after the 1954 season.

He also played for the club's hockey team. His brothers Thorbjørn (1919–1998) and Ivar (1921–2004) played football for Vålerenga.

Andresen died on 27 December 2008, a few weeks after his eightieth birthday.
