= Helge Høva =

Norwegian politician (1928–2010)

Helge Høva (4 August 1928 – 14 February 2010) was a Norwegian politician for the Progress Party.

He was born in Eidsvoll. He was educated with the cand.jur. degree, and worked as a jurist in the Norwegian Automobile Federation from 1959 to his retirement in 1995.

He was a member of Bærum municipal council from 1979 to 2007 and Akershus county council from 1995 to 2003. He was the deputy mayor of Bærum from 1999 to 2003. He served as a deputy representative to the Parliament of Norway during the term 1997–2001.

He resided at Kjørbokollen in Sandvika. He died in February 2010 in Egypt.
