= Leif Ottersen =

Norwegian priest

Leif Petter Ottersen (5 December 1928 – 28 October 2017) was a Norwegian priest.

He was hired as a curate in Vestre Aker in 1972, and from 1977 he was a vicar as well as dean of the deanery of the same name. From 1988 to 1996 he was the dean of the Diocese of Oslo, which encompasses Asker, Bærum and the country's capital, Oslo.
