= Gunnar Edvard Gundersen =

Norwegian economist, politician, and organizational leader

- Born: 24 October 1927; Grimstad, Norway
- Died: 14 February 2017 (aged 89)
- Occupations: Economist; Politician
- Awards: King's Medal of Merit (2006)

Gunnar Edvard Gundersen (24 October 1927 – 14 February 2017) was a Norwegian economist, politician and organizational leader.

== Early and personal life ==
Gundersen was born in Grimstad, Norway, to banker Gunnar Gundersen and his wife, Margit Tobiassen. He graduated in social economy from the University of Oslo in 1953.

== Career ==
Gundersen was elected deputy representative to the Storting for the periods 1973–1977 and 1977–1981 for the Conservative Party. He was engaged in organizational work, as well in sports (gymnastics, swimming and football), culture and politics. Being a member of the municipal council of Grimstad nearly contiguously from 1959 to 2003, he also served as mayor of Grimstad 1982–1983. He was awarded the King's Medal of Merit in gold in 2006.

Gundersen died in February 2017, 89 years old.
