= Norwegian Research Council for Science and the Humanities =

Norwegian research council

The Norwegian Research Council for Science and the Humanities (Norges almenvitenskapelige forskningsråd, NAVF) was one of Norway's five research councils. It was established in 1949. NAVF was responsible for funding basic research in all disciplines. In 1993, the five research councils merged into the present Research Council of Norway.
