= 1953 in Norway =

- Centuries: 18th; 19th; 20th; 21st
- Decades: 1930s; 1940s; 1950s; 1960s; 1970s
- See also: List of years in Norway

Events in the year 1953 in Norway.

== Incumbents ==
- Monarch – Haakon VII.
- Prime Minister – Oscar Torp (Labour Party)

== Events ==
- 25 January – Ole Hallesby gives a sermon broadcast on NRK (Norsk rikskringkasting) that caused a major debate in Norway on the existence of hell.
- 7 May – The Norwegian Academy for Language and Literature (Det Norske Akademi for Sprog og Litteratur) is founded.
- 1 June – The first Bergen International Festival opens.
- 16 July – Parliament voted to move the main base for the Navy from Horten to Bergen.
- 11 September – The Norwegian Consumer Council established
- 12 October – The 1953 Parliamentary election takes place.
- 15 November – Four men suspected of spying for the Soviet Union were arrested in Kirkenes.

== Notable births ==
=== January to March ===
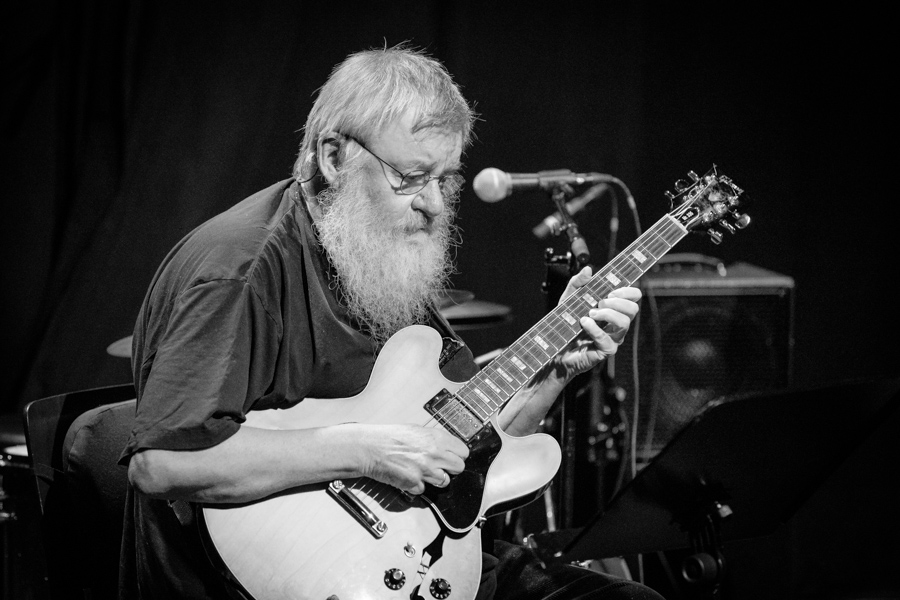
Jon Eberson

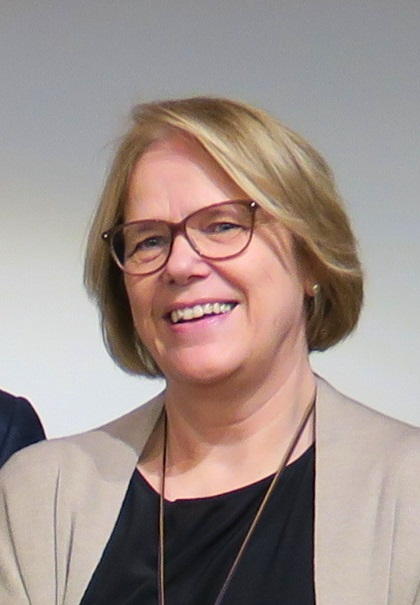
Oda Sletnes

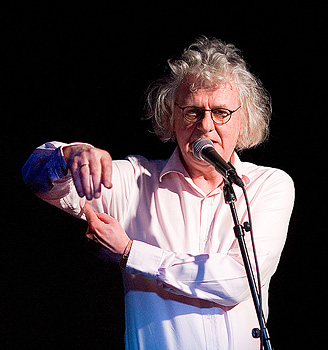
Per Inge Torkelsen

- 6 January – Jon Eberson, jazz guitarist
- 15 January – Morten Sethereng, ice hockey player.
- 19 January – Audun Endestad, Norwegian-born American cross-country skier.
- 25 January – Stein Stugu, politician.
- 10 February – Aud Folkestad, politician.
- 10 February – Oda Sletnes, diplomat.
- 18 February – Erling Aksdal, jazz pianist
- 18 February – Sverre Bugge, politician.
- 20 February – Tom Rüsz Jacobsen, footballer.
- 26 February – Halvor Nordhaug, bishop.
- 2 March – Kjell Terje Fevåg, politician.
- 6 March – Jan Kjærstad, author.
- 8 March – Kristin Ørmen Johnsen, politician.
- 8 March – Odd Kristian Reme, priest and politician (died 2024).
- 11 March – Øivind Storm Bjerke, art historian.
- 18 March – Bjørn Iversen, politician.
- 21 March – Per Inge Torkelsen, humorist (died 2021).
- 27 March – Svein Engen, biathlete.
- 27 March – Jørn Goldstein, ice hockey player.

=== April to June ===
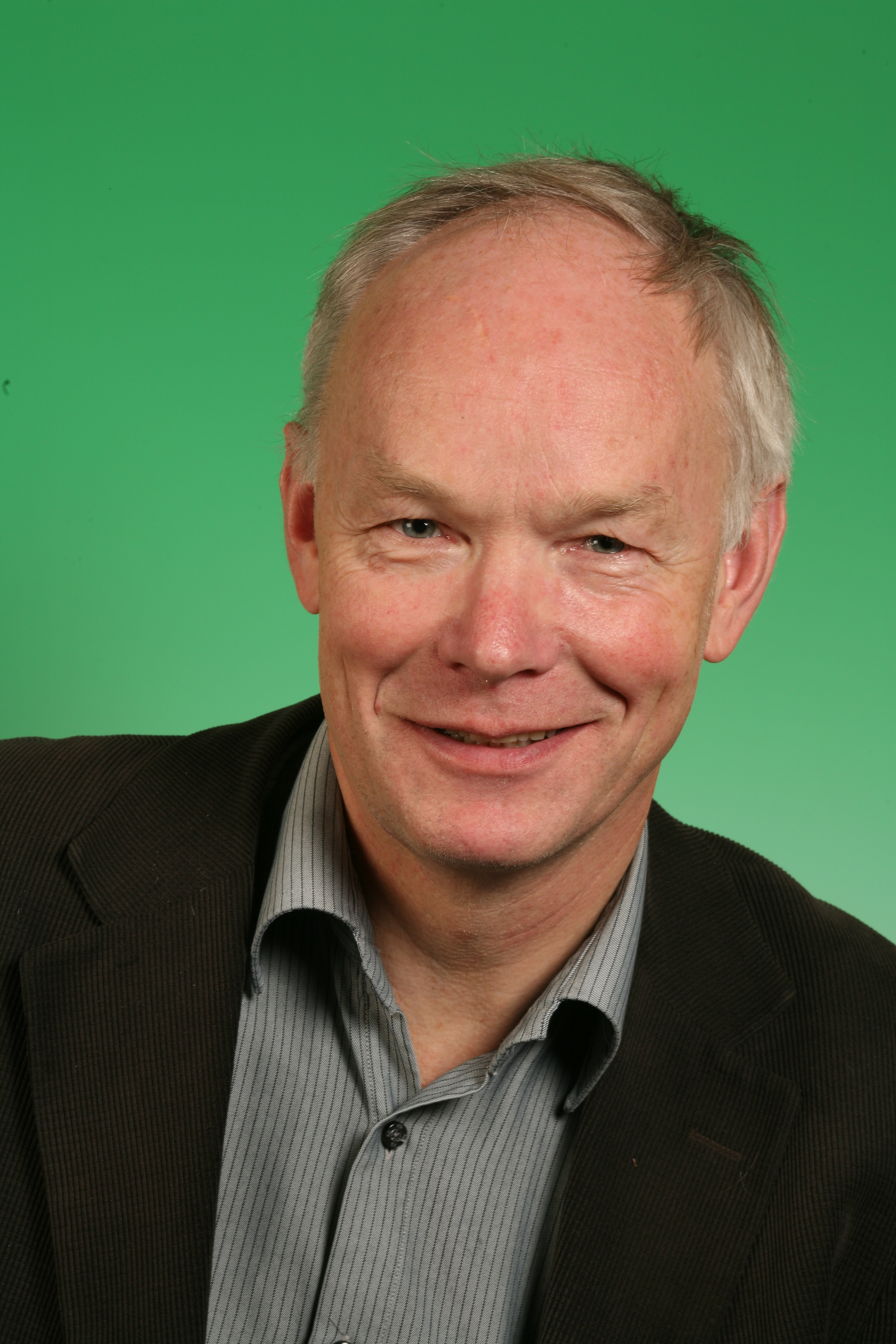
Per Olaf Lundteigen

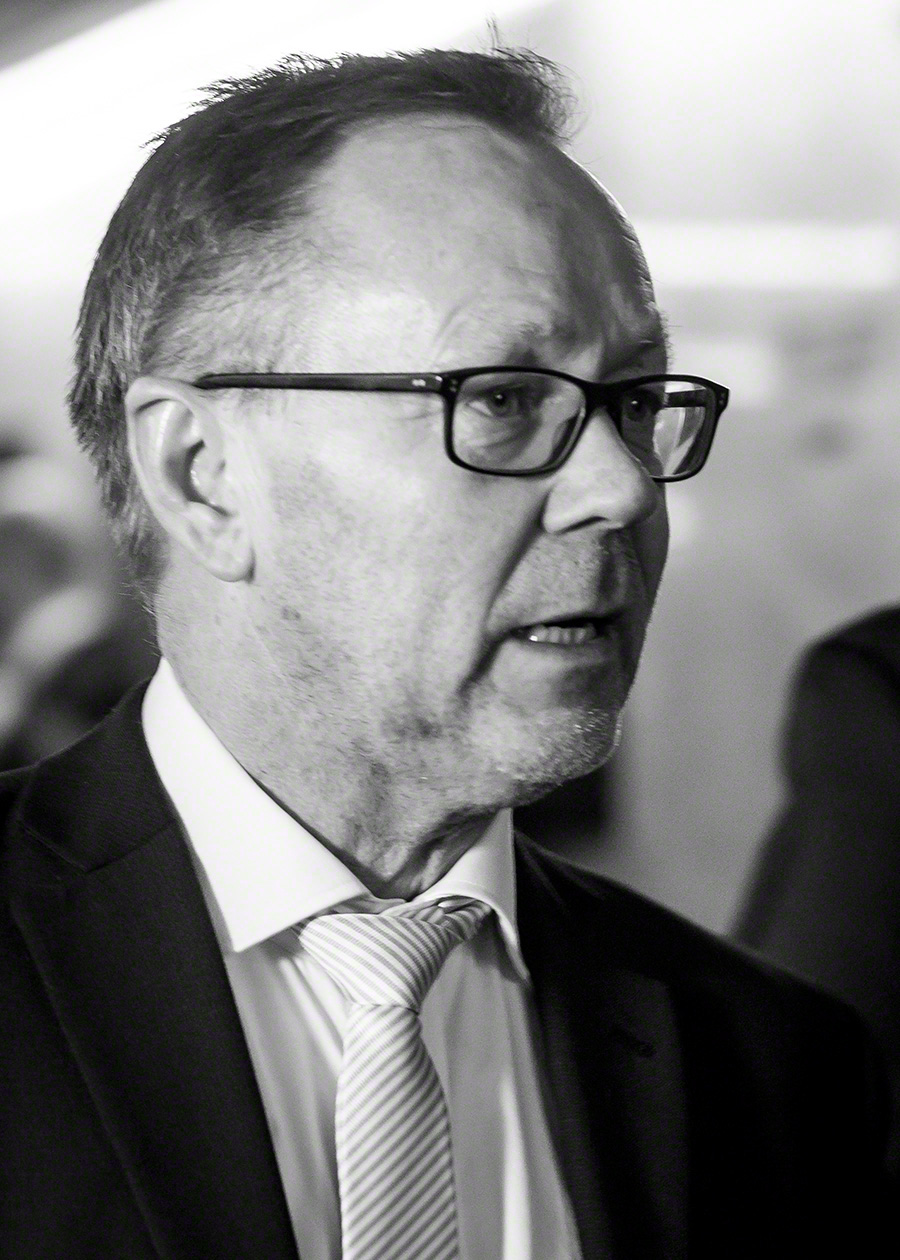
John Arne Markussen

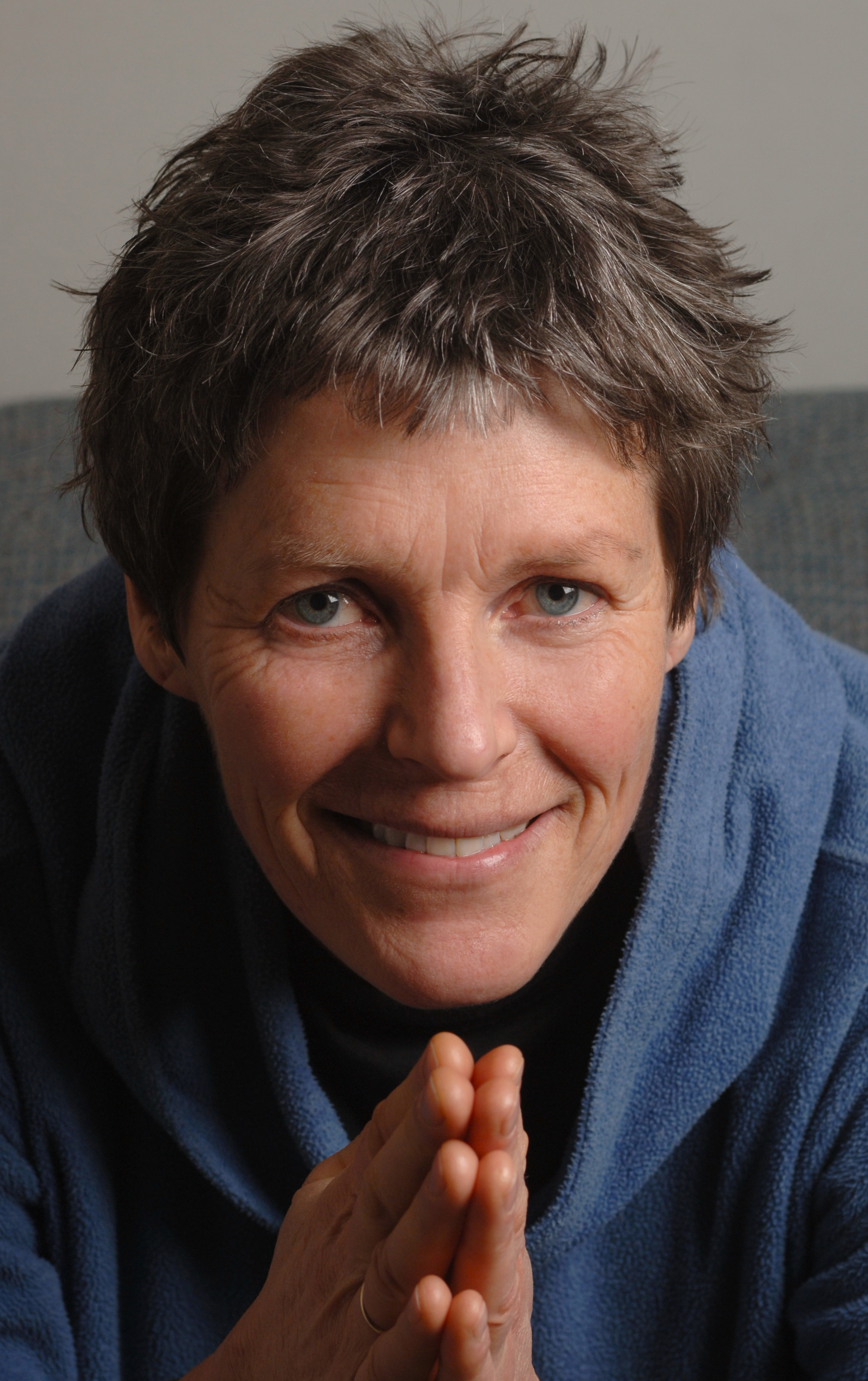
Liv Arnesen

- 2 April – Eivind Reiten, corporate officer.
- 4 April – Geir Pollen, writer.
- 4 April – Morten Steenstrup, politician (died 2025).
- 13 April – Tom Olstad, jazz drummer
- 17 April – Joakim Lystad, civil servant.
- 18 April – Per Olaf Lundteigen, politician.
- 24 April – Nina Bjerkedal, civil servant
- 24 April – Øyvind Sandberg, film director
- 1 May – Kirsti Blom, writer.
- 6 May – Sigurd Dæhli, orienteering competitor.
- 8 May – May Hansen, politician
- 12 May – Odd Riisnæs, jazz saxophonist
- 16 May – Pål Henning Hansen, cyclist.
- 16 May – Per Skjærvik, politician.
- 16 May – Ivar Skulstad, politician.
- 17 May – Sverre Kile, swimmer.
- 20 May – John Arne Markussen, journalist and newspaper editor.
- 20 May – Bjarte Tørå, politician.
- 22 May – Elsa Lundanes, chemist.
- 1 June – Liv Arnesen, adventurer.
- 2 June – Vidar Johansen, jazz saxophonist
- 14 June – Gunnar Kvassheim, newspaper editor and politician.
- 25 June – Svein Tindberg, actor.
- 29 June – Juni Dahr, actress.
- 30 June – Ståle Wikshåland, musicologist (died 2017).

=== July to September ===
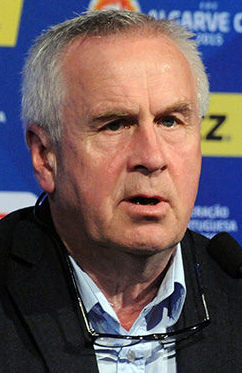
Even Pellerud

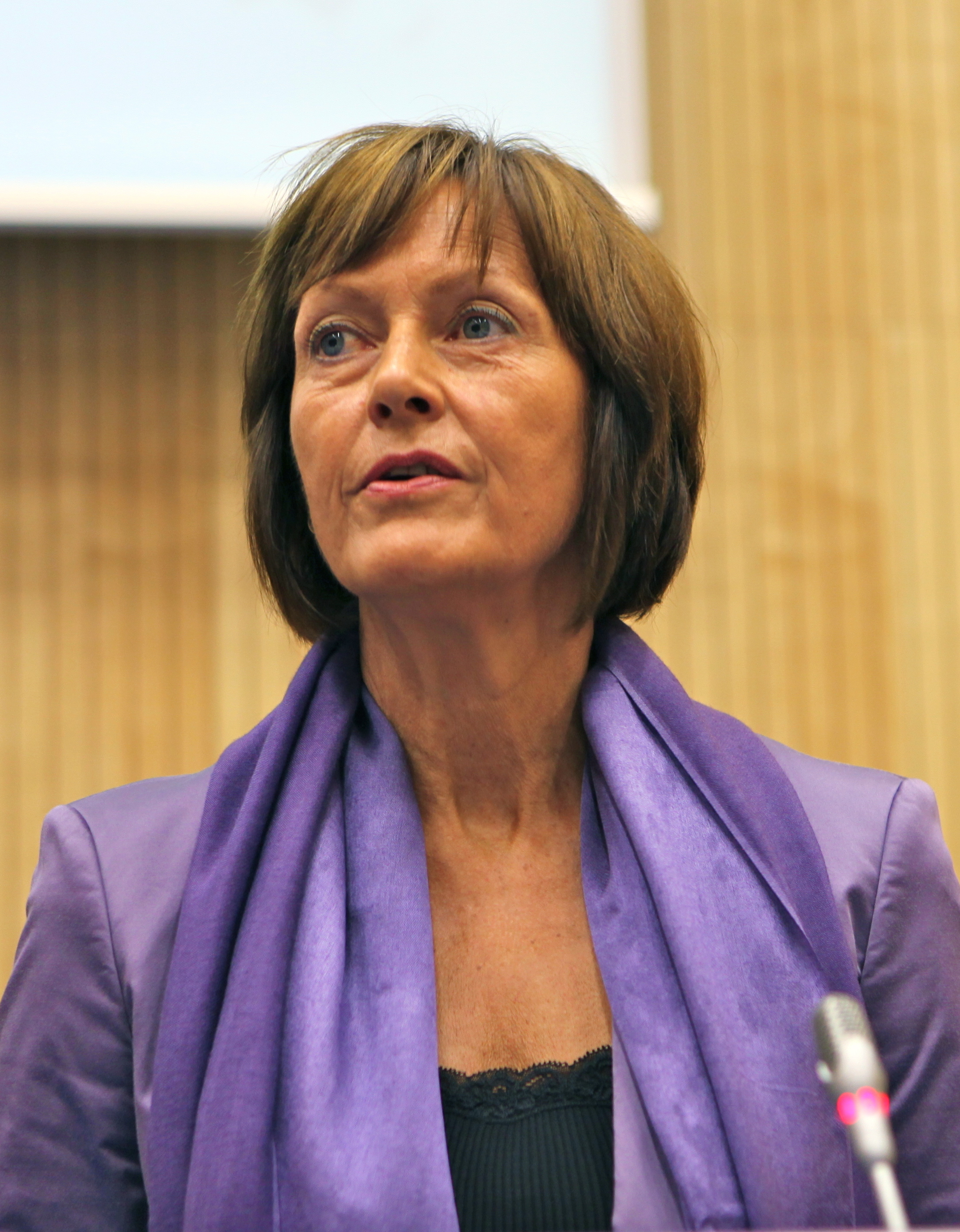
Astrid Versto

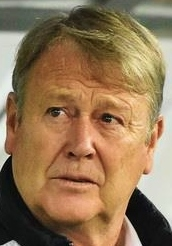
Åge Hareide

- 5 July – Magnus Skåden, politician.
- 8 July – Terje Nyberget, politician.
- 13 July – Sigurd Ulveseth, jazz upright bassist
- 15 July – Even Pellerud, football coach.
- 21 July – Kenneth Skoglund, sport shooter.
- 27 July – Hildegunn Eggen, actress.
- 29 July – Aud Marit Wiig, diplomat.
- 31 July – Trond Brænne, actor (died 2013).
- 3 August – Astrid Versto, journalist and diplomat.
- 9 August – Kay Stenshjemmet, speed skater.
- 11 August – Trygve Helgaker, chemist.
- 18 August – Sven Tore Jacobsen, handball player and coach.
- 22 August – Bente Hansen, gymnast.
- 25 August – Anne Wahl, sprint canoer.
- 27 August – Kjell Arvid Svendsen, politician.
- 31 August – Gunnar Hynne, politician.
- 8 September – Stein-Erik Olsen, guitarist.
- 9 September – Sissel Birgitte Breie, diplomat.
- 12 September – Bernt Ivar Eidsvig, catholic prelate and bishop.
- 14 September – Tom Sandberg, photographer (died 2014).
- 18 September – Leif Sande, trade unionist and politician.
- 19 September – Olav Berstad, diplomat
- 21 September – Lars Saabye Christensen, author
- 23 September – Åge Hareide, footballer (died 2025).
- 29 September – Asle Strand, luger (died 2000).
- 30 September – Atle Brynestad, investor.

=== October to December ===
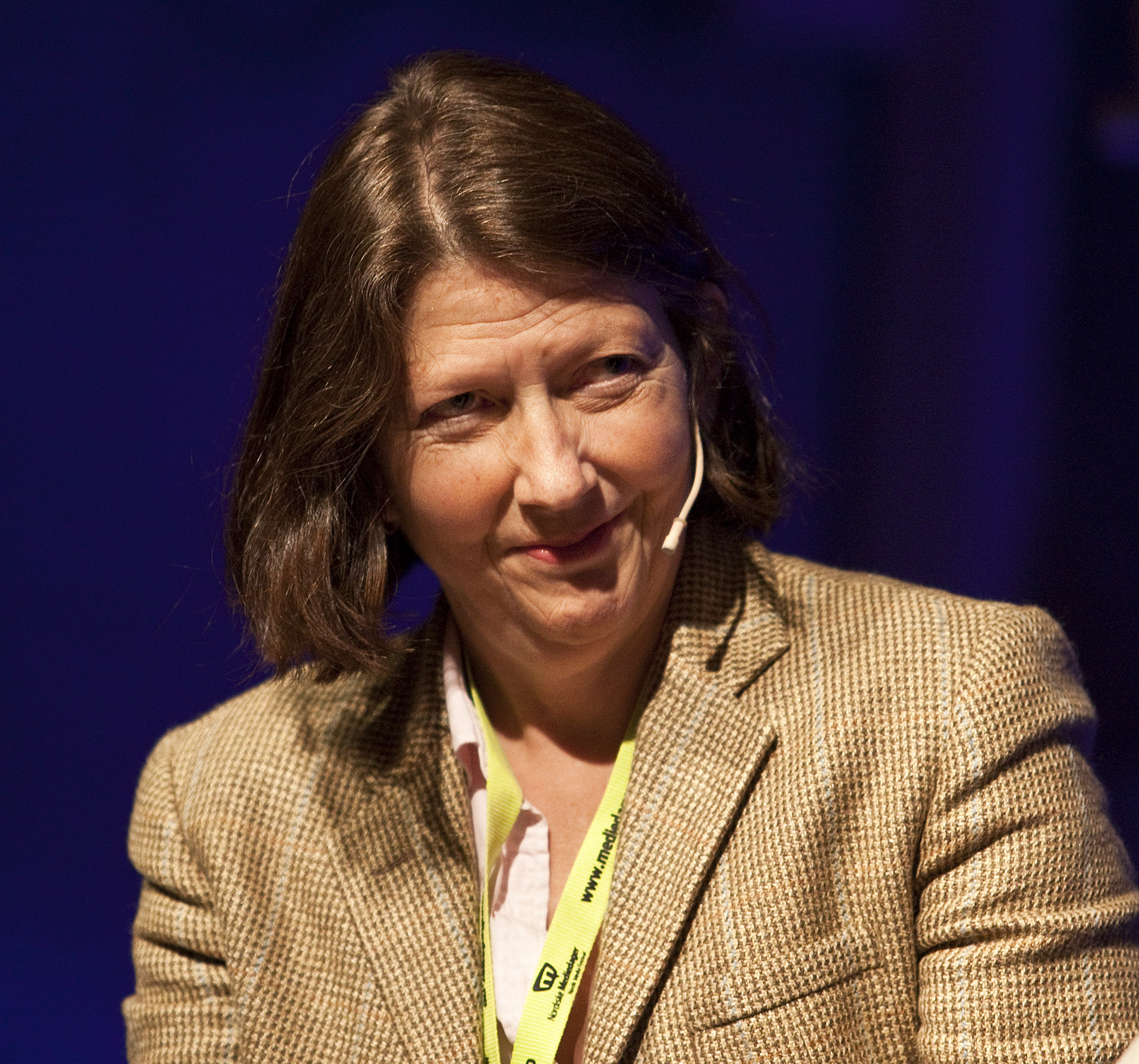
Guri Hjeltnes

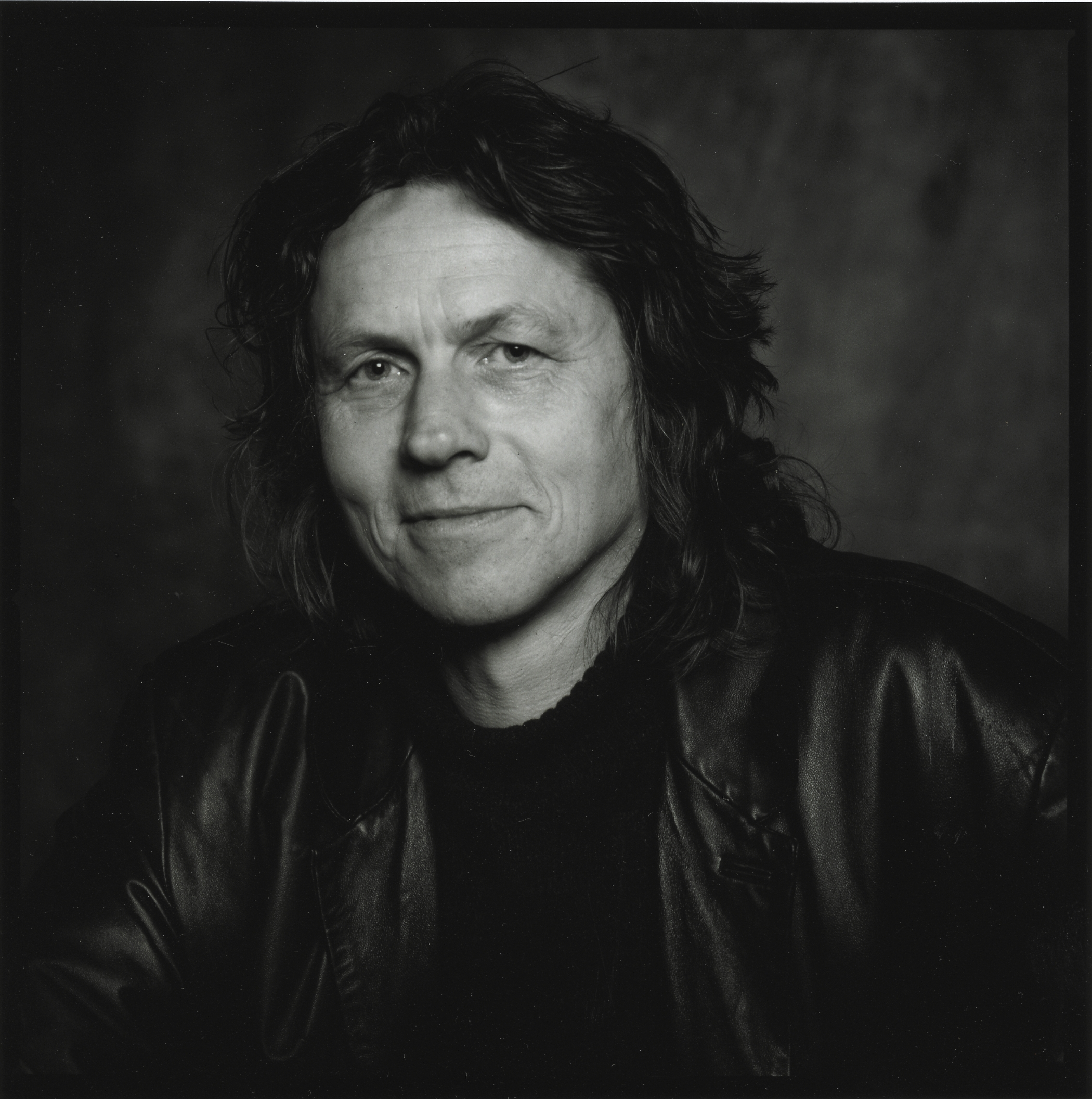
Stein Erik Lunde

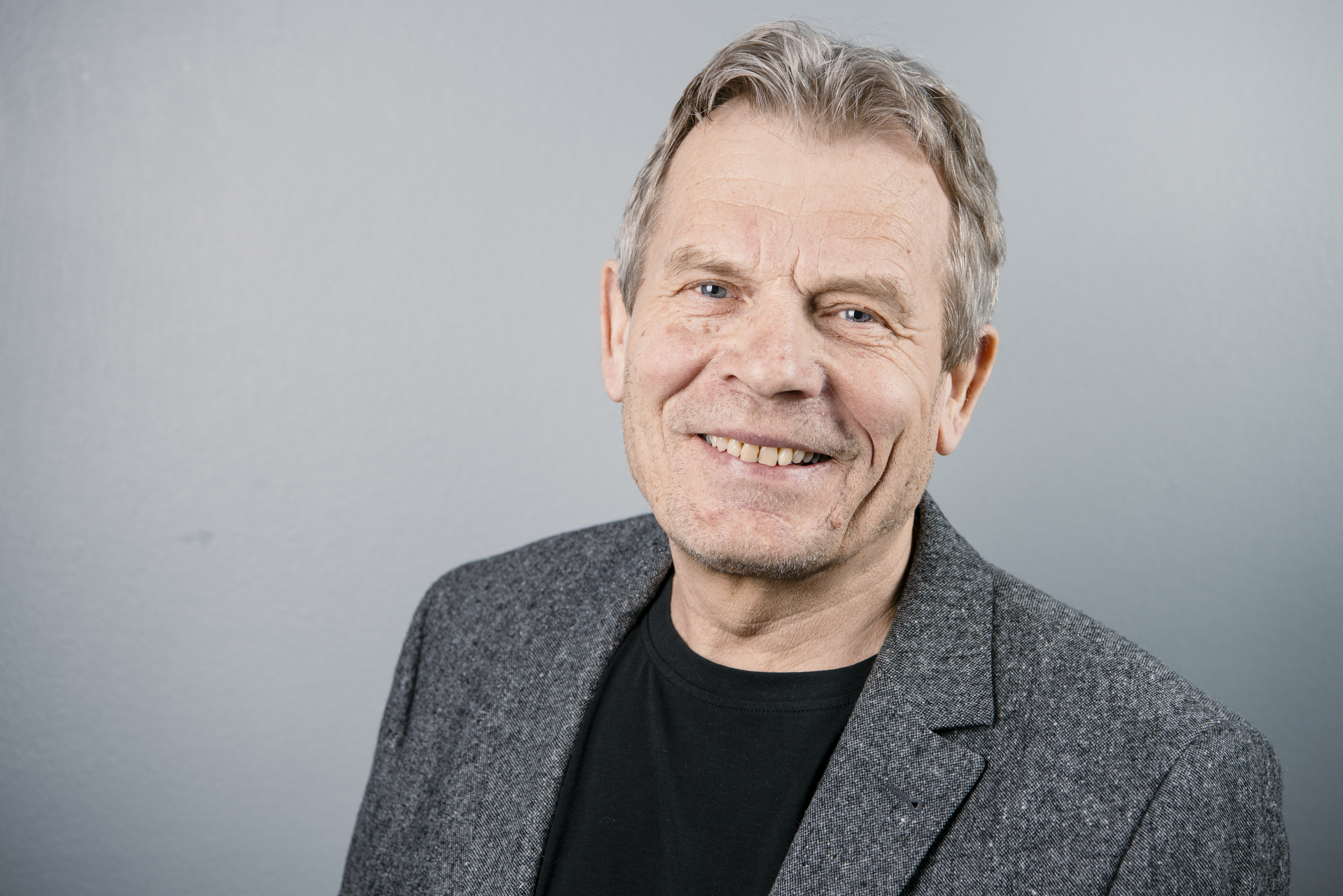
Arne Nævra

- 23 October – Guri Hjeltnes, historian.
- 25 October – Bjarne Rønning, writer.
- 31 October – Rolf Lofstad, sport shooter.
- 1 November – Hans Fredrik Grøvan, politician.
- 4 November – Ola Røtvei, politician.
- 7 November – Erik Balke, jazz saxophonist
- 10 November – Erland Kiøsterud, writer.
- 14 November – Tor Ulven, writer (died 1995).
- 22 November – Stein Erik Lunde, novelist, children's writer, biographer and textbook writer.
- 22 November – Marit Nicolaysen, children's writer.
- 25 November – Helge Gaarder, rock musician (died 2004).
- 28 November – Toril Moi, literary scholar.
- 1 December – Kirsti Saxi, politician.
- 2 December – Stein Tønnesson, historian.
- 7 December – Arne Nævra, photographer and politician, member of the Storting.
- 13 December – Torgeir Dahl, politician.

=== Full date unknown ===
- Erik Blücher, political activist
- Nils Lid Hjort, statistician and professor
- Per Hannevold, principal bassoonist of the Bergen Philharmonic Orchestra
- Elisabeth Kværne, folk musician (died 2024).
- Marry A. Somby, Sami author.

== Notable deaths ==
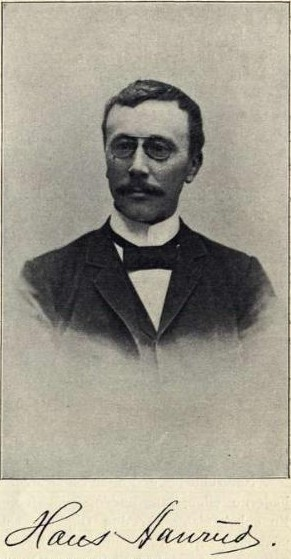
Hans Aanrud

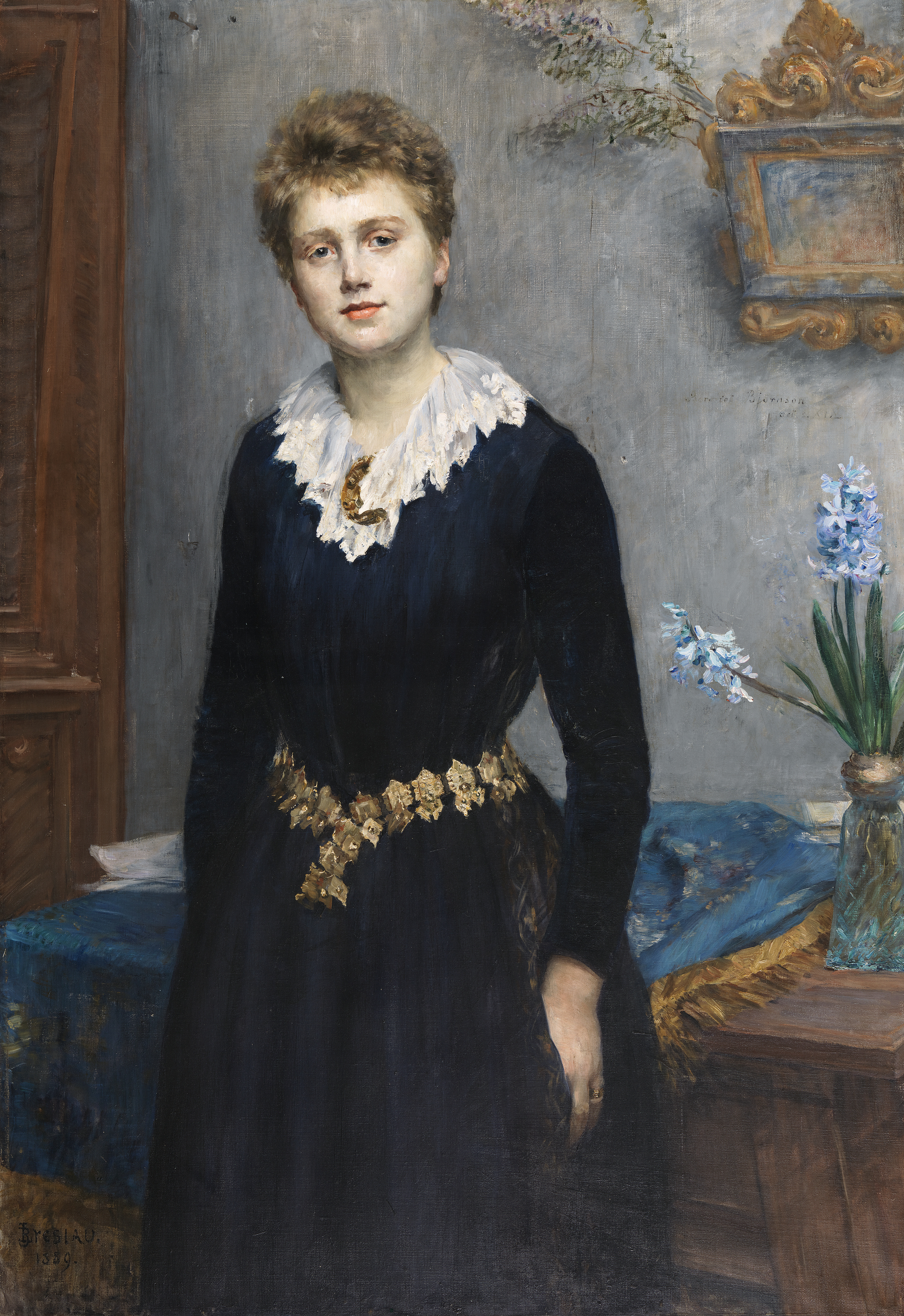
Bergliot Ibsen

- 11 January – Hans Aanrud, author, poet and playwright (born 1863)
- 18 January – Sigurd Kloumann, engineer and industrial leader (born 1879).
- 31 January – Fanny Schnelle, politician, women's rights advocate, teacher and humanitarian (born 1866)
- 2 February – Bergliot Ibsen, mezzosoprano singer (born 1869).
- 9 March – Ole Iversen, gymnast and Olympic silver medallist (born 1884)
- 2 April – Halfdan Hansen, sailor and Olympic gold medallist (born 1883)
- 20 May – Lorentz Brinch, barrister, military officer, resistance member and politician (born 1910).
- 2 June – Henrik Bull, architect (born 1864).
- 18 June – Thomas Thorstensen, gymnast and Olympic gold medallist (born 1880)
- 24 June – Jentoft Jensen, politician (born 1901)
- 12 July – Otto Olsen, rifle shooter and Olympic gold medallist (born 1884)
- 18 July – Ole Jensen Rong, politician (born 1885)
- 4 September – Magdalon Monsen, soccer player and Olympic bronze medallist (born 1910).
- 12 September – Sigrid Boo, author (born 1898)
- 21 October – Johan H. Andresen, industrialist (born 1888).
- 11 November – Marie Karsten, interior designer (born 1872).
- 9 December – Issay Dobrowen, composer and conductor (born 27 February 1891).

=== Full date unknown ===
- Solveig Haugan, stage and movie actress (born 1901)
- Kristen Holbø, painter and illustrator (born 1869)
- Johan Martin Holst, surgeon and military doctor (born 1892).
- Christian Pierre Mathiesen, politician and Minister (born 1870)
- Jonas Pedersen, politician (born 1871)
- Marius Nygaard Smith-Petersen, physician and orthopaedic surgeon in America (born 1886)
- Alfred Trønsdal, politician (born 1896)
- Eirik Vandvik, professor in literature (born 1904)
