= 2024 in Norway =

- Centuries: 19th; 20th; 21st
- Decades: 2000s; 2010s; 2020s
- See also: List of years in Norway

Events in the year 2024 in Norway.

== Incumbents ==
- Monarch – Harald V
- President of the Storting – Masud Gharahkhani (Labour).
- Prime Minister – Jonas Gahr Støre (Labour).

== Events ==
=== January ===
- 1 January – Partial revert of the municipal and county reform:
  - The former county of Troms og Finnmark is split into the counties of Troms and Finnmark.
  - The former county of Vestfold og Telemark is split into the counties of Vestfold and Telemark.
  - The former county of Viken is split into the counties of Akershus, Buskerud and Østfold.
- 19 January – Research and Higher Education Minister Sandra Borch resigns after admitting to have committed plagiarism in her master's thesis.

=== February ===
- 2 February – In two local referendums, Søgne Municipality and Songdalen Municipality both vote yes to remain parts of Kristiansand Municipality.
- 29 February – A Sikorsky S-92 helicopter owned by Bristow Norway crashes six kilometers off the coast of Bergen, killing one and injuring five others.

=== April ===
- 12 April – Health Minister Ingvild Kjerkol resigns after a probe by her alma mater Nord University found that she had committed plagiarism in her master's thesis.

=== May ===
- 22 May – Israel recalls its ambassadors to Norway, Ireland, and Spain, after the respective governments announce they will recognise the State of Palestine as a sovereign state starting 28 May, calling for a two-state solution.
- 28 May – The government officially recognises the State of Palestine, after declaring their intention to do so on May 22.

=== June ===
- 16 June – Norway announces it will give Ukraine 1.1 billion kroner (US$103 million) to help repair its energy infrastructure and secure the country's electricity supply before winter.

=== July ===
- 2 July – The Police Security Service announces the arrest of a Norwegian national at Oslo Airport on suspicion of spying for China.
- 4 July – The Oslo District Court convicts Zaniar Matapour of terrorism over the 2022 Oslo shooting and sentences him to 30 years' imprisonment.

=== August ===
- 4 August – Marius Borg Høiby, the son of Crown Princess Mette-Marit, is arrested in Oslo on suspicion of assaulting a woman.
- 17 August – Eurovision Young Musicians 2024 in Bodø
- 27 August – The Viking replica vessel Naddodd sinks during stormy conditions off the coast of Stad, killing one of its six passengers.
- 31 August – The wedding of Princess Märtha Louise and American self-professed shaman Durek Verrett takes place in Geiranger.

=== September ===
- 4 September – Sissel Knutsen Hegdal resigns as mayor of Stavanger with immediate effect following misused election campaign funds.
- 19 September – The Norwegian Veterinary Institute announces the first cases of bluetongue disease in Norway since 2009 following tests on livestock in the south of the country.
- 25 September – Authorities announce the arrest of a German resident of Cameroonian origin on suspicion of inciting crimes against humanity during the Anglophone Crisis.
- 26 September – Authorities issue an international wanted notice on a foreign-born Norwegian national suspected of involvement in the delivery of pagers used in the 2024 Lebanon pager explosions.

=== October ===
- 1 October – Jens Stoltenberg is succeeded by Mark Rutte as Secretary-General of NATO.
- 8 October – The PST raises the country's threat level from "moderate" to "high", citing an increase in threats to targets relating to Israel and Jews. The level returns to moderate on 14 November.
- 9 October – The Supreme Court designates the Norwegian chapters of the Satudarah motorcycle club as a "criminal association" and orders their banning.
- 23 October – Innlandet county council votes to close the upper secondary schools in Lom, Dombås, Dokka, Skarnes, Flisa and Sønsterud permanently.
- 24 October – The Arctic Circle Express train travelling from Trondheim to Bodø derails following a rockslide in Finneidfjord, Nordland, killing one person and injuring four others.
- 29 October – A tram derails and crashes into a store in Storgata, Oslo, injuring four people.

=== November ===
- 18 November – Marius Borg Høiby, the son of Crown Princess Mette-Marit, is arrested on suspicion of sexual assault after being found with the woman he was accused of assaulting in August.
- 20 November – A student of the University of Tromsø is arrested on suspicion of spying for Russia and Iran while concurrently working as a security guard at the US embassy in Oslo.

=== December ===
- 1 December – The government suspends the issuance of licences for deep-sea mining projects following a demand from the Socialist Left Party in exchange for it supporting the annual budget.
- 26 December – A bus carrying tourists falls into a lake near Raftsundet in the Lofoten archipelago, killing three people and injuring four others.
- 28 December – KLM Flight 1204, carrying 176 passengers and 6 crew members, took off from Oslo Airport runway 19L when the main wheel delaminated and damaged the aircraft. Part of the wheels came loose and the hydraulic system was damaged. The crew reported the issue and stopped climbing at 5000 ft. Then they decided to perform an emergency landing. As the Oslo Airport was foggy and the visibility was low, the plane diverted to Sandefjord Airport. Upon landing there, the aircraft skidded to the right, off the runway.

== Anniversaries ==
- 14 January – 100 years since the death of Arne Garborg
- 19 January – 100 years since the death of Christian Skredsvig
- 23 April – 100 years since the birth of Margit Sandemo

== Holidays ==
- 1 January - New Year's Day
- 28 March - Maundy Thursday
- 29 March – Good Friday
- 31 March - Easter Sunday
- 1 April - Easter Monday
- 1 May - May Day
- 9 May - Ascension Day
- 17 May - Constitution Day
- 19 May - Pentecost
- 20 May - Whit Monday
- 24 December - Christmas Day
- 25 December – Second Day of Christmas

== Art and entertainment ==
- List of Norwegian submissions for the Academy Award for Best International Feature Film

== Sports ==
- 5 January – At the 2024 European Speed Skating Championships, a world record of 3:34.22 minutes in the team pursuit event is set by Sander Eitrem, Peder Kongshaug and Sverre Lunde Pedersen.
- 19 January–1 February – Norway does not win any gold medals at the 2024 Winter Youth Olympics
- 28 January – Norway finishes atop the medal table at the 2024 IBU Open European Championships, winning six of the eight events.
- 4–8 June – the 2024 CONIFA Women's World Football Cup is held in Bodø.

- 8 June – the Sápmi women's national football team wins the 2024 CONIFA Women's World Cup.

- 7–12 June – Norway wins four gold medals at the 2024 European Athletics Championships
- 26 July–11 August – Norway at the 2024 Summer Olympics
- 28 August–8 September – Norway at the 2024 Summer Paralympics
- 15 September – Karoline Bjerkeli Grøvdal breaks the official Norwegian record in the half marathon, achieving 66:55 minutes in the Copenhagen Half Marathon.
- 6 October – In the 2024 Paris–Tours, Edvald Boasson Hagen competes in his last professional cycling race.
- 20 October – It is announced that Vipers Kristiansand are seeking bankruptcy. Following another attempt to save the club, the bankruptcy is finalized in 2025.

== Deaths ==
=== January ===
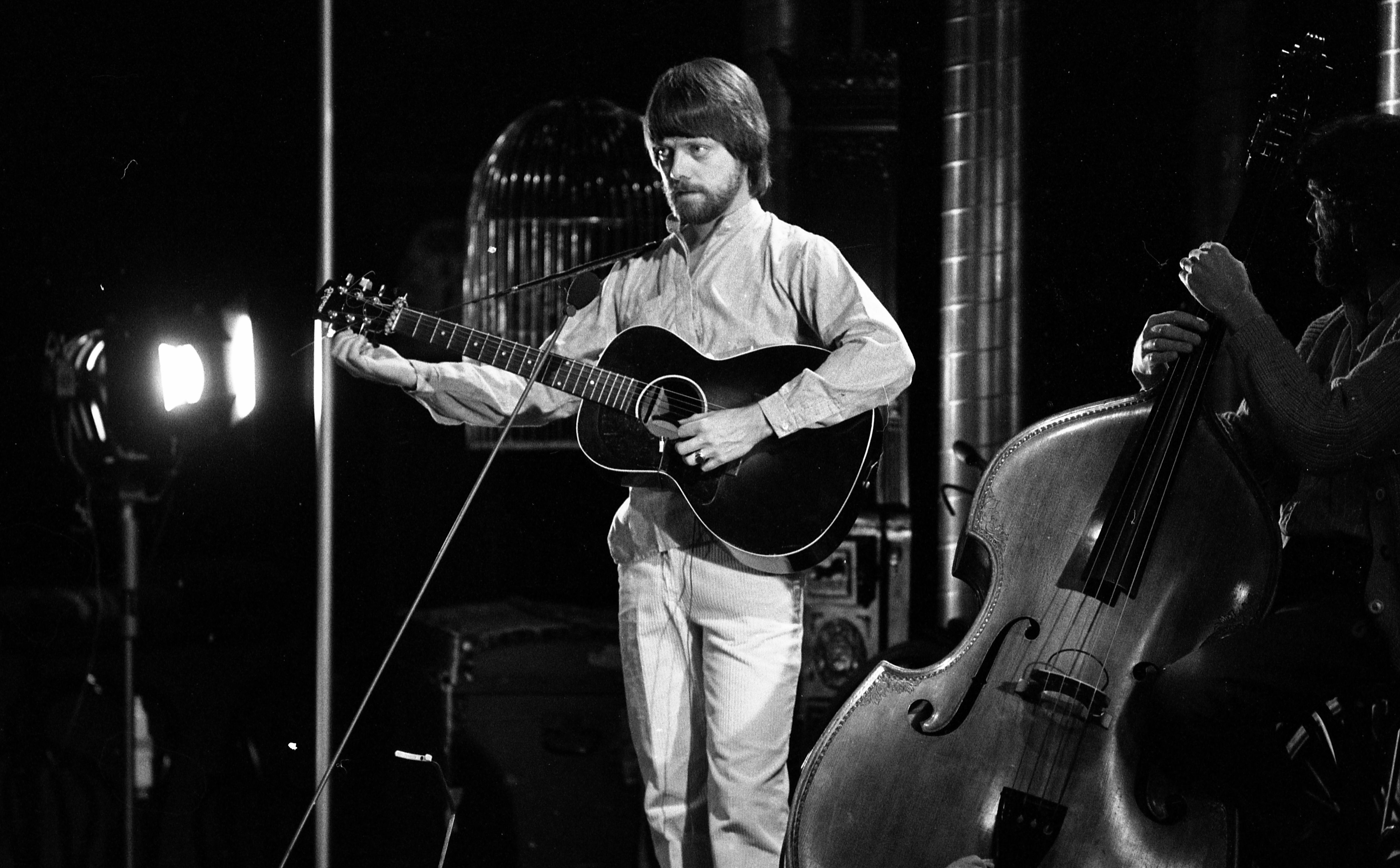
Lillebjørn Nilsen

- 1 January – Ole Daniel Enersen, climber, journalist and medical historian (born 1943).
- 2 January – Andreas Heldal-Lund, activist (born 1964).
- 7 January – Leonard Rickhard, painter (born 1945).
- 10 January – Velle Espeland, folklorist (born 1945).
- 11 January – Peter Ørebech, legal scholar and politician (born 1948).
- 12 January – Per Grieg, shipbroker and ship-owner (born 1932).
- 17 January – Knut Hjeltnes, athlete (born 1951).
- 18 January – Magne Helvig, geographer (born 1926).
- 19 January – Rolv Hellesylt, judge (born 1927).
- 21 January – Eva Heir, headmaster and politician (born 1943).
- 23 January – Lars Lefdal, politician (born 1939).
- 27 January – Lillebjørn Nilsen, singer and songwriter (born 1950).
- 28 January – Egil Egebakken, visual artist (born 1943).
- 31 January – Leif Eriksen, footballer (born 1940).

=== February ===
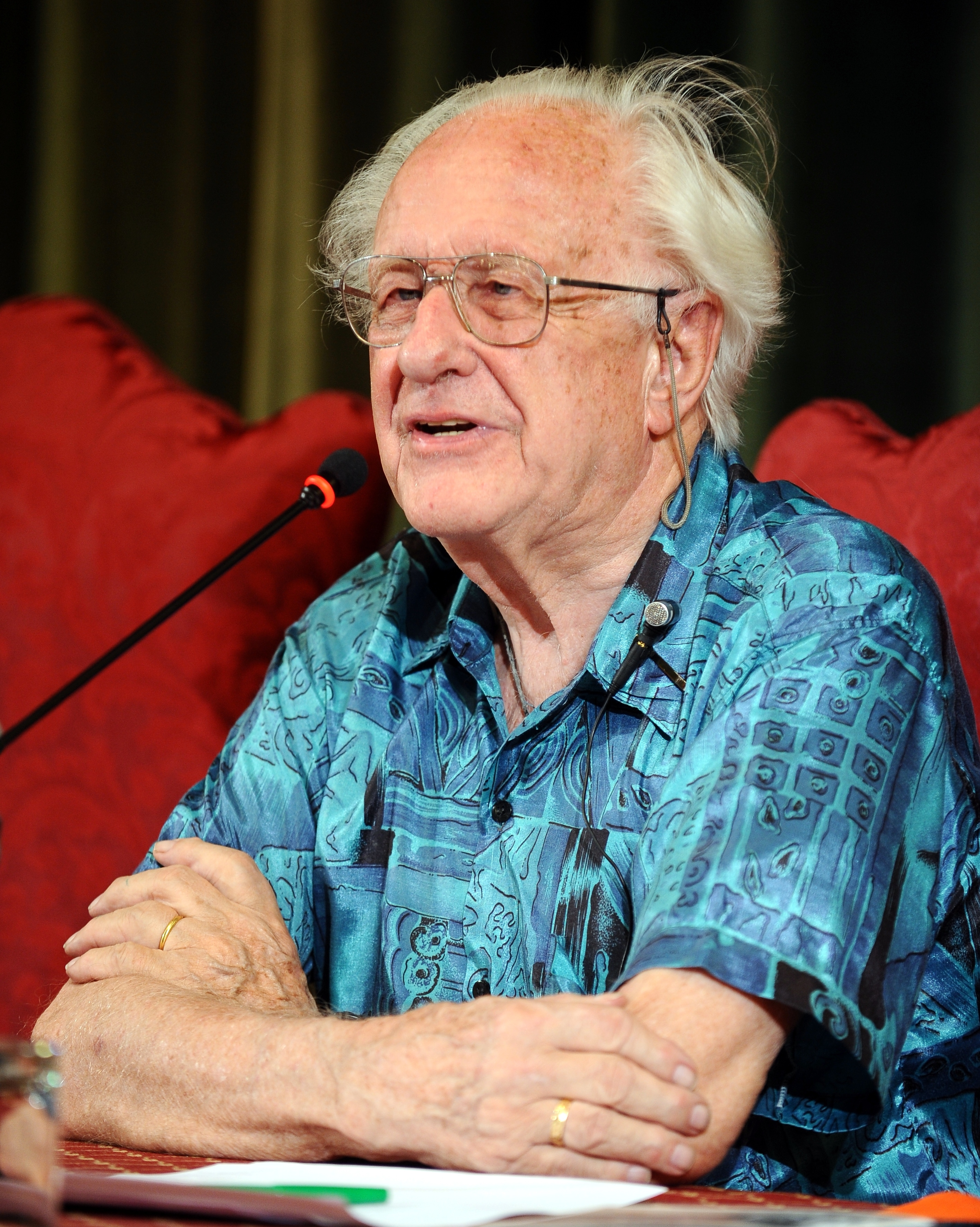
Johan Galtung

- 5 February – Toppen Bech, television presenter (born 1939).
- 6 February – Ivar Molde, politician (born 1949).
- 9 February – Eva Harr, artist (born 1951).
- 11 February – Margrethe Tennfjord, politician (born 1935).
- 12 February – Mounir Hamoud, footballer (born 1985).
- 13 February – Reidar Thomassen, writer (born 1936).
- 15 February – Arnfinn Johs. Stein, politician (born 1931).
- 16 February – Ottar Brox, politician and sociologist (born 1932).
- 17 February – Johan Galtung, sociologist (born 1930).
- 18 February –
  - Steinar Bastesen, politician (born 1945).
  - Lorns Skjemstad, cross-country skier (born 1940).
- 20 February – Martin Hole, cross-country skier (born 1959).
- 22 February – Asbjørn Aase, geographer (born 1932).
- 26 February – Rolf Aamot, artist (born 1934).
- 26 February – Johanne Hansen-Krone, artist (born 1952).
- 26 February – Stein Winge, actor and theatre director (born 1940).
- 27 February – Arild Holm, alpine skier (born 1942).

=== March ===
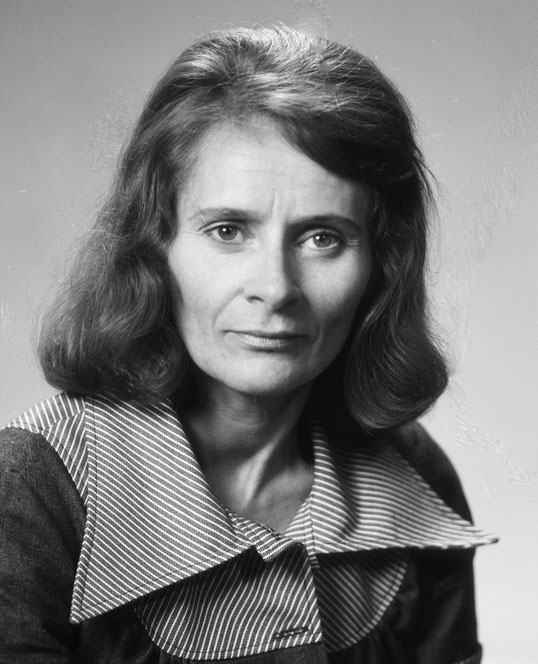
Sidsel Mørck

- 1 March – Erling Folkvord, politician (born 1949).
- 1 March – Bjørn Pedersen, chemist (born 1933).
- 2 March – Ørjar Øyen, sociologist (born 1927).
- 2 March – Odd Selmer, writer (born 1930).
- 4 March – Eivor Øvrebø, model agency owner (born 1930).
- 5 March – Dagmar Loe, journalist (born 1923).
- 5 March – Sidsel Mørck, writer (born 1937).
- 9 March – Bernt Brendemoen, turkologist (born 1949).
- 13 March – Helga Haugen, politician (born 1932).
- 14 March – Arne Alsåker Spilde, politician (born 1937).
- 14 March – Ute de Lange Nilsen, jewelry artist and puppet maker (born 1931).
- 18 March – Tone Vigeland, silversmith and jewellery designer (born 1938).
- 27 March – Stein Bråten, sociologist (born 1934).
- 30 March – Lasse Sigurd Seim, diplomat (born 1943).

=== April ===
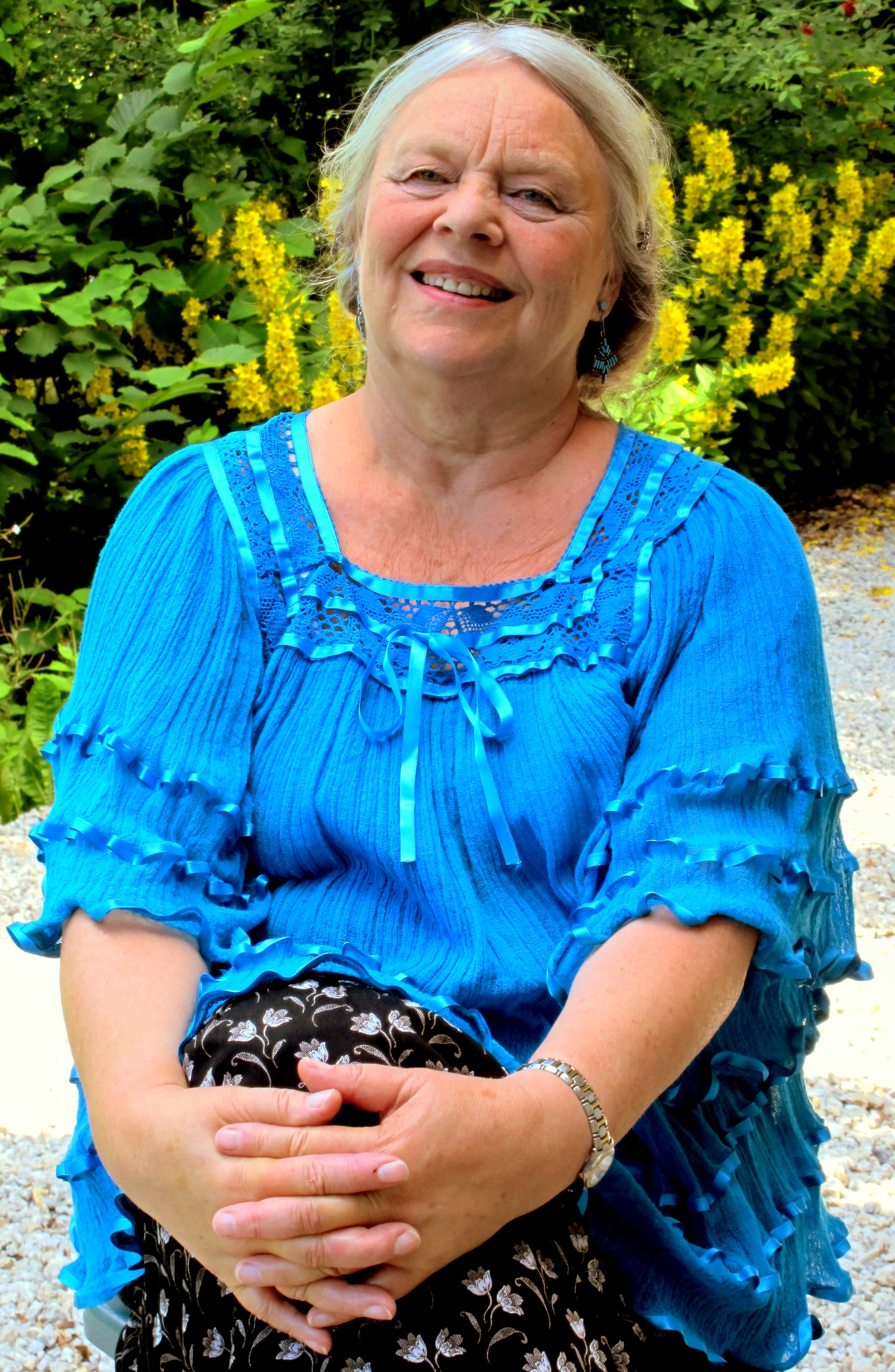
Dagne Groven Myhren

- 6 April – Dutty Dior, rapper (born 1996).
- 6 April – Kåre Venn, forest pathologist (born 1935).
- 13 April – Morten Rieker, skier and sailor (born 1940).
- 15 April – Atle Ørbeck Sørheim, veterinarian and civil servant (born 1933).
- 17 April – Per Henriksen, footballer (born 1952).
- 29 April – Dagne Groven Myhren, folk musician and literary scholar (born 1940).

=== May ===
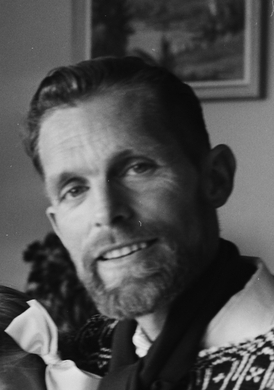
Sverre M. Fjelstad

- Announced 2 May – Halvdan Furholt, folk musician (born 1931).
- 5 May – Alexander Reichenberg, ice hockey player (born 1992).
- 7 May – Jan Helge Jansen, politician (born 1937).
- 9 May –
  - Kurt Narvesen, poet and translator (born 1948).
  - Tore Schweder, statistician (born 1943).
- 17 May – Pål Johannessen, child actor (born 1959).
- 18 May – Edgeir Benum, historian (born 1939).
- 28 May – Sverre M. Fjelstad, zoologist and photographer (born 1930).

=== June ===
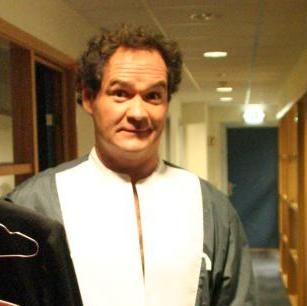
Steffen Tangstad

- 3 June – Dag Erik Pedersen, cyclist and sports journalist (born 1959).
- 4 June – Karin Gundersen, literary scholar and translator (born 1944).
- 4 June – Aase Moløkken, politician (born 1930).
- 5 June – Petter Nome, television personality, and organizational leader (born 1954).
- 9 June – Svenn Kristiansen, politician (born 1940).
- 14 June – Trygve Reenskaug, computer scientist (born 1930).
- 20 June – Gunnar Stubseid, folk musician and educator (born 1948)
- 23 June – Olav T. Laake, judge and politician (born 1934).
- 26 June – Steffen Tangstad, professional boxer (born 1959).
- 29 June – Pål Enger, art thief (born 1967).
- 30 June – Hallvard Bakke, politician (born 1943).

=== July ===
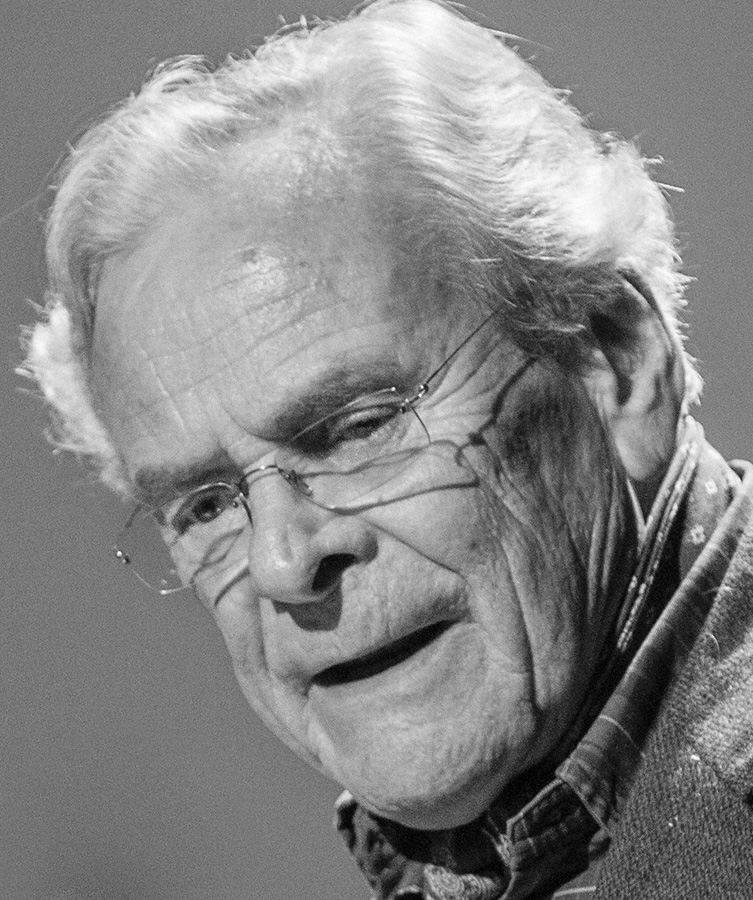
Torkjell Berulfsen

- 1 July – Thor Spydevold, footballer (born 1944).
- 6 July – André Drege, cyclist (born 1999).
- 12 July – Leif Solheim, ice hockey player (born 1932).
- 17 July –
  - Bjørn Hernæs, politician (born 1936).
  - Odd Kristian Reme, priest and politician (born 1953).
- 24 July – Torkjell Berulfsen, television personality (born 1943).
- 26 July – Geir Karlsen, footballer (born 1948).

=== August ===
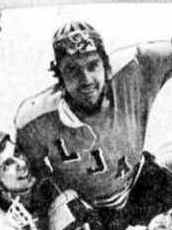
Steinar Bjølbakk

- 1 August – Steinar Bjølbakk, ice hockey player (born 1946).
- 1 August – Kari Botterud, politician (born 1943).
- 3 August – Eyvind W. Wang, politician (born 1942).
- 7 August – Kristian Eidesvik, businessperson and politician (born 1945).
- 9 August – Thor-Øistein Endsjø, physician and sport shooter (born 1936).
- 9 August – Vidar Hansson, physician (born 1944).
- 12 August – Are Næss, physician and politician (born 1942).
- 21 August –
  - Rolf Bækkelund, violinist and conductor (born 1925).
  - Vesla Vetlesen, weaver and politician (born 1930).
  - Per Werenskiold, sailor (born 1944).
- 23 August – Trude Dybendahl, cross-country skier (born 1966).
- 31 August – Hvaldimir, beluga whale (body found on this date).

=== September ===
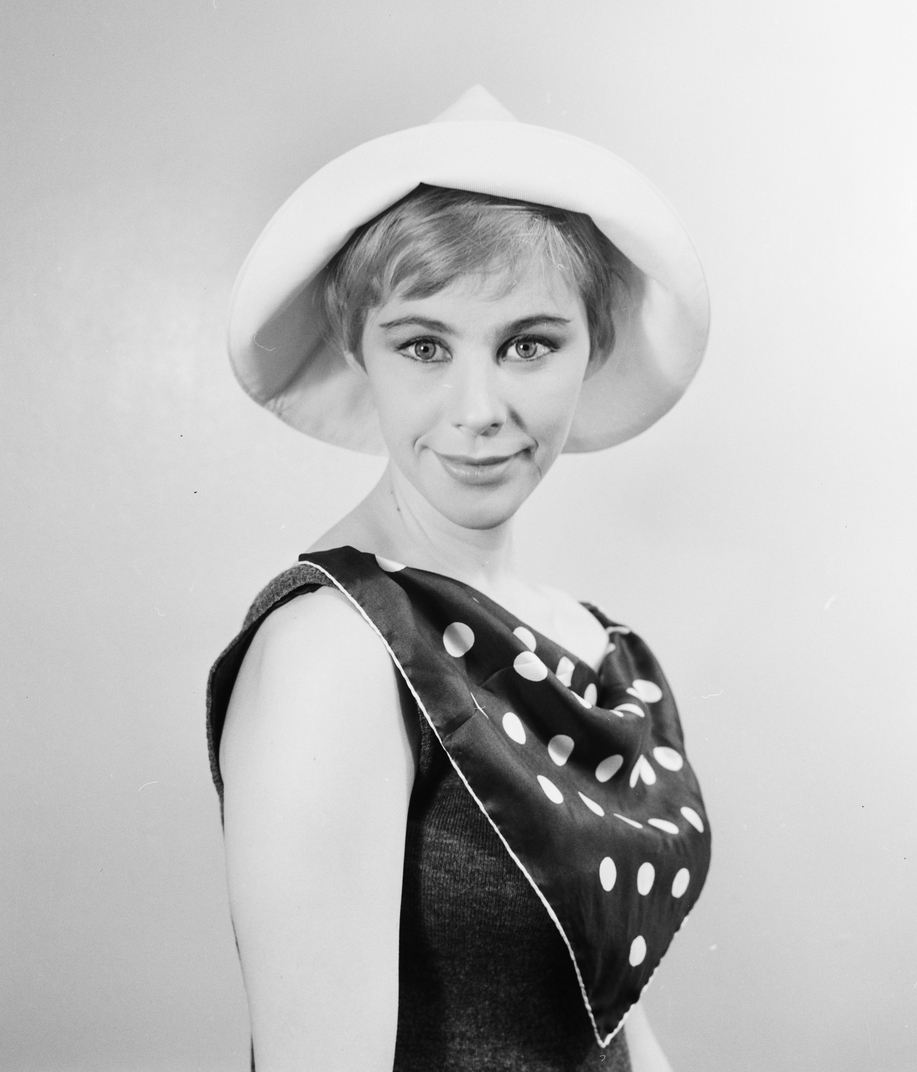
Henny Moan

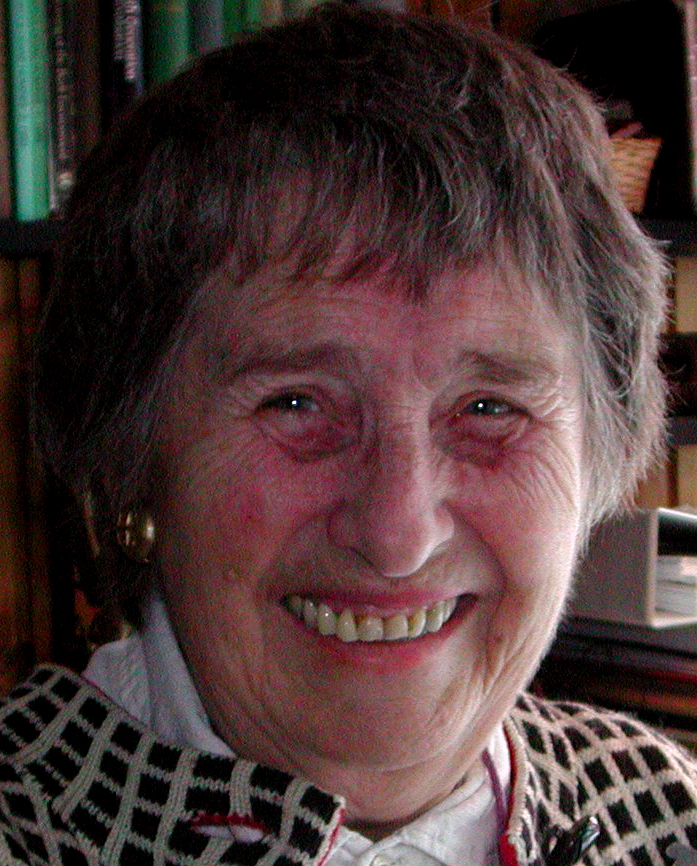
Berit Ås

- 6 September – Truls Olav Winther, literary historian (born 1944).
- 8 September – Henny Moan, actress (born 1936).
- 13 September – Per A. Utsi, politician (born 1939).
- 14 September – Berit Ås, politician (born 1928).
- 15 September – Karin Sundbye, textile artist (born 1928).
- 16 September – Alv O. Bergset, politician (born 1931).
- 19 September – Kari Vogt, historian of religion (born 1939).
- 20 September – Victor D. Norman, economist and politician (born 1946).
- 27 September – Kjeld Rimberg, businessperson (born 1943).
- 29 September – Jostein Berntsen, politician (born 1943).
- 30 September – Peter Opsvik, furniture designer (born 1939).

=== October ===
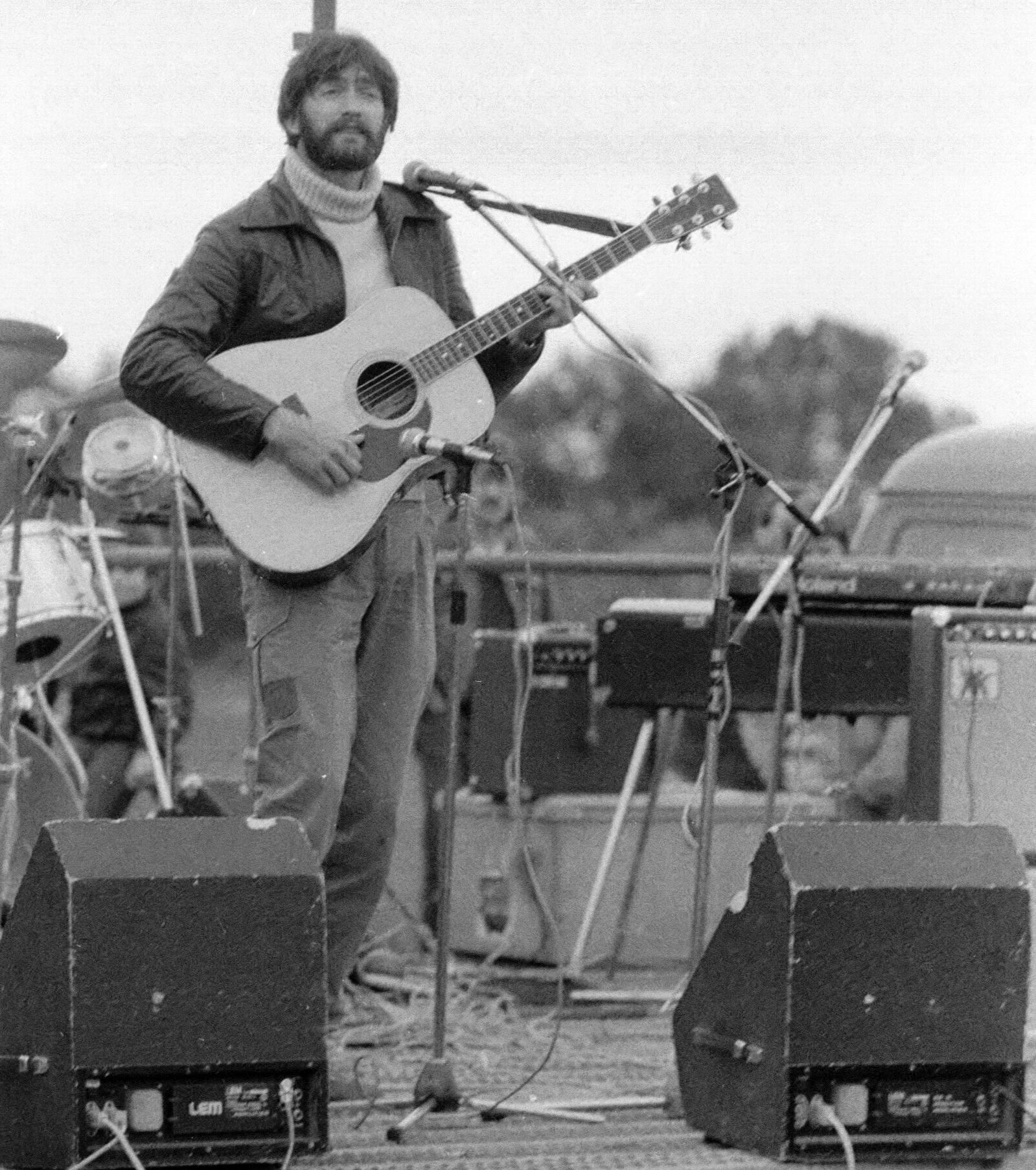
Hans Rotmo

- 1 October – Gudbrand Bakken, veterinarian and civil servant (born 1941).
- 4 October – Terje Bjørklund, jazz pianist and composer (born 1945).
- 7 October – Harald Arnljot Øye, chemical engineer (born 1935).
- 9 October – Arild Gulden, footballer and handball player (born 1941).
- 10 October – Gunnar Eggen, harness racer (born 1946).
- 13 October – Christian Fredrik Borchgrevink, physician (born 1924).
- 17 October – Egil Sakshaug, oceanographer (born 1942).
- 20 October – Peter L. Nissen, aviator and businessperson (born 1924).
- 24 October – Hans Rotmo, singer and songwriter (born 1948).
- 27 October – Fredmund Sandvik, farmer and politician (born 1951).
- 30 October – Ole Jonny Friise, bandy player, footballer (born 1941).

=== November ===
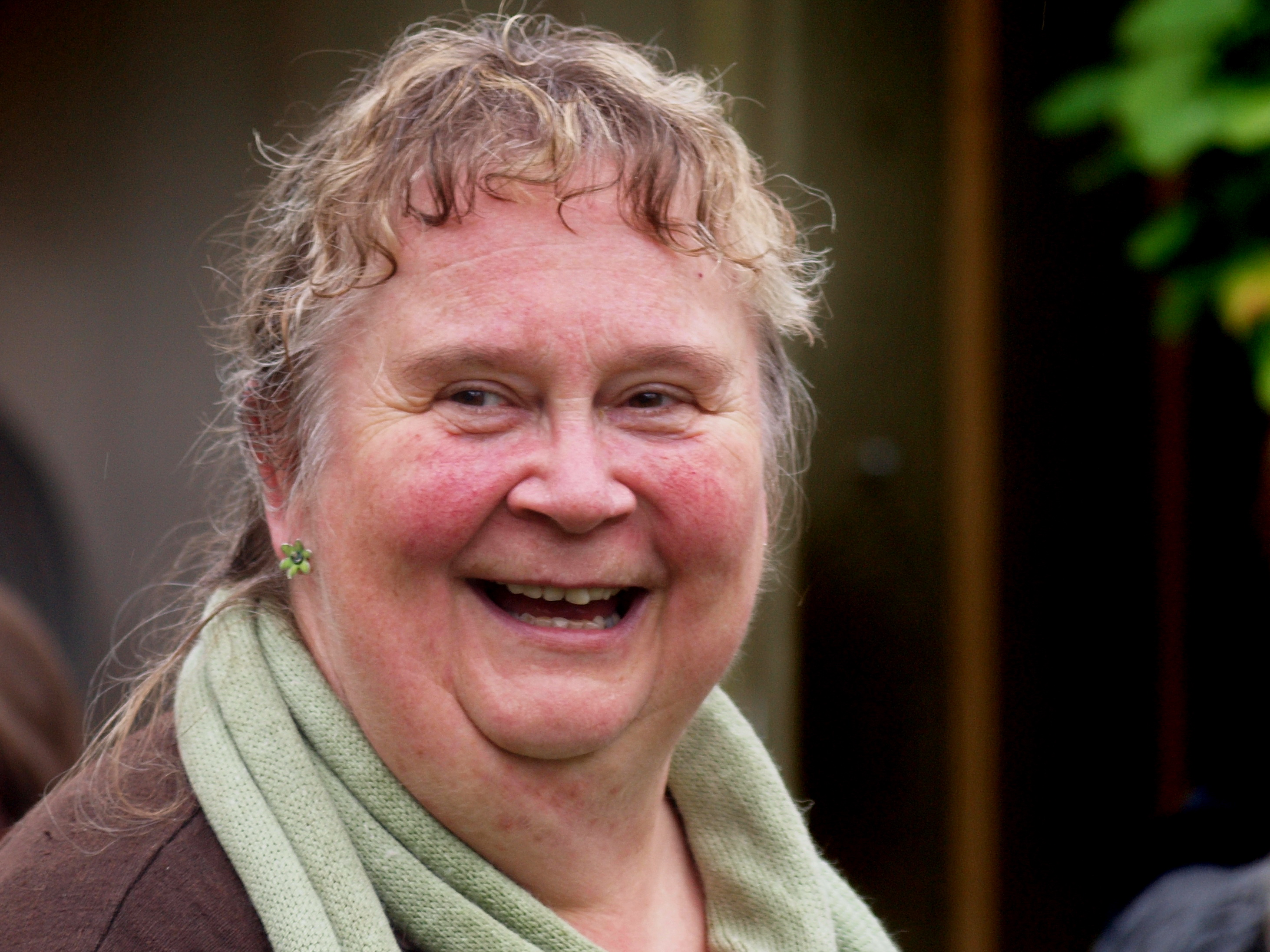
Agnes Buen Garnås

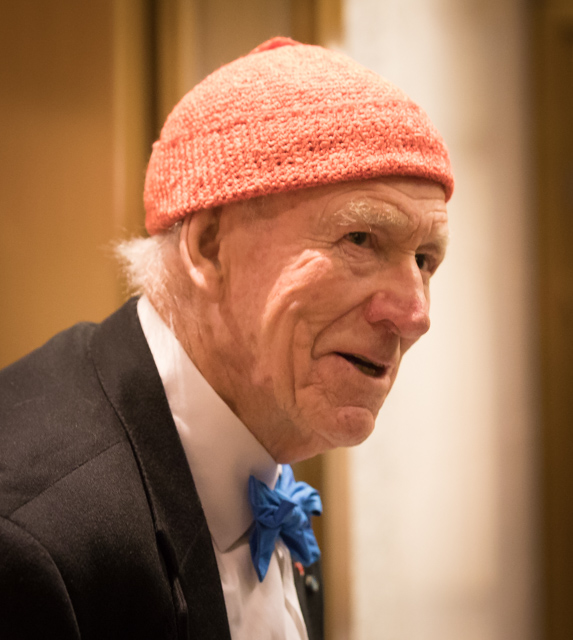
Olav Thon

- 7 November – Arent M. Henriksen, politician (born 1946).
- 8 November – Aud Voss Eriksen, politician (born 1937).
- 12 November – Bendiks H. Arnesen, politician (born 1951).
- 12 November –Agnes Buen Garnås, folk singer (born 1946).
- 15 November – Trygve Bornø, footballer and sports administrator (born 1942).
- 16 November – Olav Thon, real estate developer (born 1923).
- 17 November – Ivar Reinvang, neurologist (born 1944).
- 25 November – Odd Flattum, newspaper editor, sports official, politician (born 1942).
- 27 November – Thomas Hylland Eriksen, anthropologist (born 1962).
- 27 November – Tor Fosse, footballer (born 1966).
- 28 November – Rolf Nyberg-Hansen, neurologist (born 1939).

=== December ===
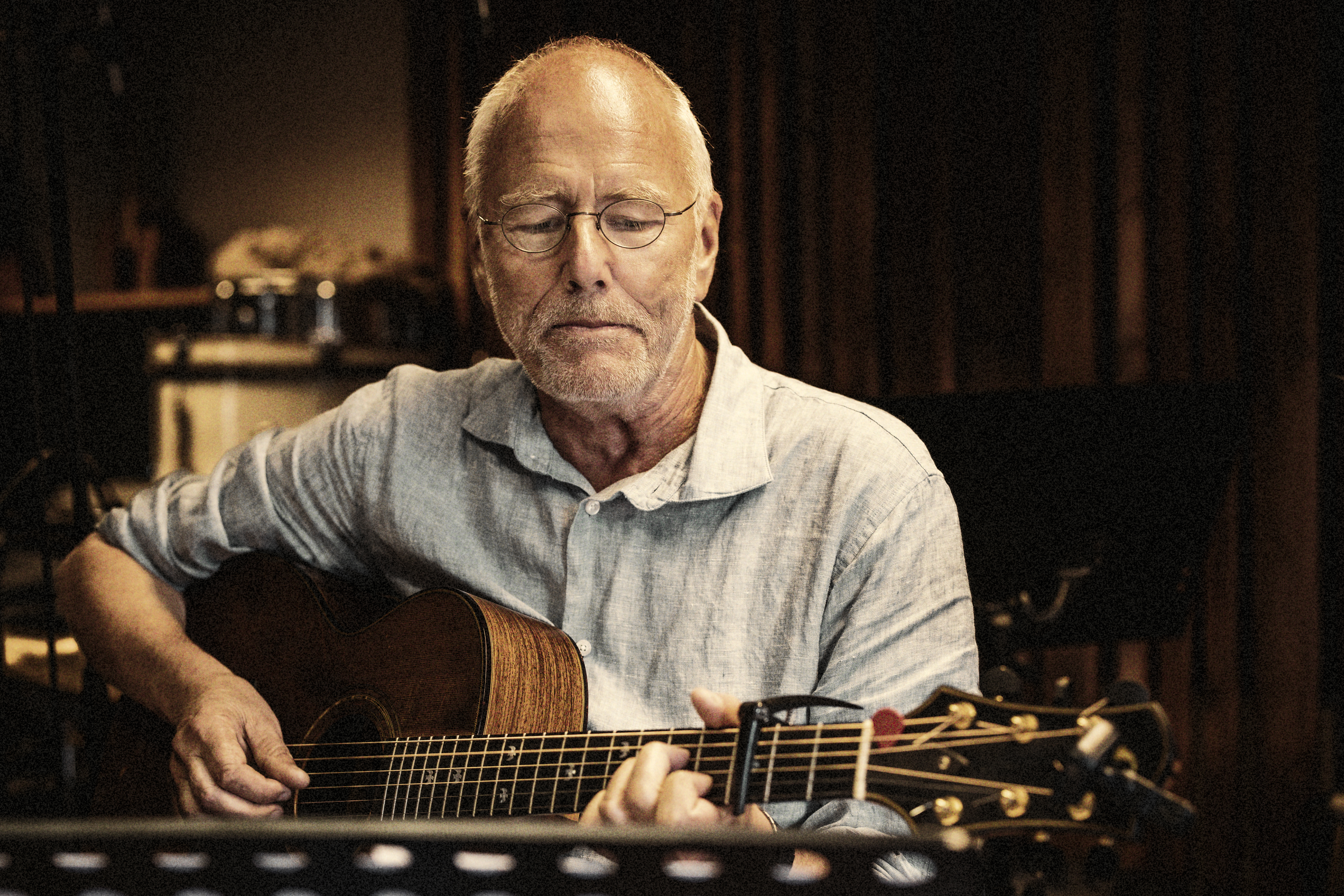
Lars Martin Myhre

- 4 December – Ruth Kleppe Aakvaag, biochemist and politician (born 1938).
- 8 December – Arild Hiim, police officer and politician (born 1945).
- 8 December – Marthe Katrine Myhre, runner and cross-country skier (born 1985).
- 8 December – Alastair Hannay, philosopher (born 1932).
- 16 December – Gunnar Breimo, politician (born 1939).
- 18 December – Bjørn Sand, revue writer and actor (born 1928).
- 24 December – Nils Aaness, speed skater (born 1936).
- 28 December – Lars Martin Myhre, guitarist and composer (born 1956).

=== Full date missing ===
- Elisabeth Kværne, folk musician (born 1953).
