= Aud (given name) =

Aud is a feminine given name used in Nordic countries. People with the name include:

- Aud Alvær (1921–2000), Norwegian politician
- Aud Blankholm (born 1947), Norwegian nurse and administrator
- Aud Blattmann (1937–2023), Norwegian politician
- Aud Egede-Nissen (1893–1974), Norwegian actress
- Aud Voss Eriksen (1937–2024), Norwegian politician
- Aud Folkestad (born 1953), Norwegian politician
- Aud Gaundal (born 1949), Norwegian politician
- Aud Groven (born 1942), Norwegian speed skater
- Aud Gustad (1917–2000), Norwegian trade unionist and politician
- Aud Haakonsdottir of Lade, Viking queen
- Aud Hove (born 1970), Norwegian politician
- Aud Hvammen (born 1943), Norwegian alpine skier
- Aud Korbøl (born 1940), Norwegian sociologist and novelist
- Aud Kvalbein (born 1948), Norwegian politician
- Aud Schønemann (1922–2006), Norwegian actress
- Aud Talle (1944–2011), Norwegian social anthropologist
- Aud the Deep-Minded (Ketilsdóttir), leader of settlers in Iceland
- Aud Valborg Tønnessen (born 1964), Norwegian theologian and academic
- Aud Marit Wiig (born 1953), Norwegian diplomat
- Aud Wilken (born 1965), Danish singer

== As a nickname for a male ==
- Aud Tuten (Audley Tuten, 1914–1994), Canadian ice hockey player

== See also ==
- Aud (disambiguation)
