= Schnelle =

Schnelle is a surname. Notable people with the surname include:

- Fanny Schnelle (1866–1953), Norwegian politician
- Udo Schnelle (born 1952), German Lutheran theologian

== See also ==
- Schneller
