= Aakvaag =

Aakvaag is a Norwegian surname. Notable people with the surname include:

- Ruth Kleppe Aakvaag (1938–2024), Norwegian biochemist and politician
- Torvild Aakvaag (1927–2020), Norwegian businessperson
