= Ingulstad =

Ingulstad is a Norwegian surname. Notable people with the surname include:

- Frid Ingulstad (1935–2026), Norwegian novelist, primarily of historical novels, many of them series
- Kari Ingulstad Botterud (1943–2024), Norwegian dentist and politician for the Centre Party
- Mats Ingulstad (born 1982), Norwegian historian and professor
