= Berstad =

Berstad is a Norwegian surname. Notable people with the surname include:

- Arnold Berstad (1940–2020), Norwegian doctor, academic and university professor
- Charles Berstad (born 1964), Norwegian football player and coach
- Finn Berstad (1901–1982), Norwegian football player
- Kristin Marie Berstad (born 1982), Norwegian author
- Olav Berstad (born 1953), Norwegian diplomat
- Ragnhild Berstad (born 1956), Norwegian composer
