= Aud the Deep-Minded =

Aud the Deep-Minded or Auðr the Deep-Minded may refer to:

- Auðr the Deep-Minded (Ívarsdóttir), 7th/8th century Norse princess
- Aud the Deep-Minded (Ketilsdóttir), 9th century settler in Iceland

== See also ==
- Aud (disambiguation)#People (for other people with the same name)
