= Bjarte =

Bjarte is a Norwegian male given name and may refer to:

- Bjarte Lunde Aarsheim (born 1975), Norwegian footballer
- Bjarte Baasland (born 1974), former Norwegian businessman and convicted fraudster
- Bjarte Birkeland (1920–2000), Norwegian literary researcher
- Bjarte Breiteig (born 1974), Norwegian short story writer
- Bjarte Bruland (born 1969), Norwegian historian
- Bjarte Eikeset (born 1937), Norwegian lawyer, judge and politician for the Conservative Party
- Bjarte Flem (born 1958), former Norwegian football goalkeeper
- Bjarte Haugsdal (born 1990), Norwegian footballer
- Bjarte Hjelmeland (born 1970), Norwegian actor and theatre director
- Bjarte Ludvigsen (born 1975), record producer from Bergen, Norway
- Bjarte Myrhol (born 1982), Norwegian handball player
- Bjarte Tørå (born 1953), Norwegian politician for the Christian Democratic Party
- Bjarte Engen Vik (born 1971), former Norwegian Nordic combined athlete
