= Skåden =

Skåden is a surname. Notable people with the surname include:

- Magnus Skåden (born 1953), Norwegian politician
- Sigbjørn Skåden (born 1976), Sámi and Norwegian poet and novelist
