= Kenneth Skoglund =

Norwegian sport shooter (born 1953)

Personal information
- Nationality: Norwegian
- Born: 21 July 1953 (age 73) Eidskog, Norway

Sport
- Sport: Shooting

Kenneth Skoglund (born 21 July 1953) is a Norwegian sport shooter. He was born in Eidskog Municipality. He competed in 50 metre running target at the 1976 and 1984 Summer Olympics, wherein he came fifth and seventeenth respectively.

He won the kongepokal trophy in 1975.
