= Fredmund Sandvik =

Norwegian politician (1951–2024)

Fredmund Sandvik (6 August 1951 – 27 October 2024) was a Norwegian farmers' leader and politician for the Centre Party.

== Life and career ==
Sandvik hailed from Laksøybygda in Meldal Municipality, and is a dairy farmer. He was the chair of Tine Midt-Norge from 1998, board member of the nationwide dairy cooperative Tine from 2002 and chair from 2006. Sandvik has also been a board member of the Norwegian Agrarian Association, and a member of the municipal council of Meldal Municipality for twelve years and Sør-Trøndelag county council for twelve years. He was a deputy representative to the Parliament of Norway from Sør-Trøndelag during the terms 1989–1993 and 1993–1997, Sp, albeit without meeting in parliamentary session.

He stepped down as chair of Tine in 2010, citing high blood pressure as the reason. In 2010 he also stepped down as chair of Norsk Landbrukssamvirke. In 2011 he was voted as leader of the election committee in the Norwegian Agrarian Association.

Sandvik died on 27 October 2024, at the age of 73.

Business positions
Preceded by Jostein Frøyland	Chair of Tine; 2006–2010	Succeeded by Trond Reierstad
