= Aud =

Aud or AUD may refer to:

== Universities ==
- Ambedkar University Delhi
- American University in Dubai

== Ships ==
- SS Aud, a 1907 Norwegian merchant ship
- SS Libau, a German merchant ship which was disguised as the Aud in an arms trafficking operation.

== People ==
- Aud (given name), list of people with the given name
- Anya Jenkins or Aud, a character in the Buffy: The Vampire Slayer TV series

== Venues ==
- Buffalo Memorial Auditorium, known as "The Aud"
- Kitchener Memorial Auditorium Complex, known as "The Aud"
- Utica Memorial Auditorium, known as "The Aud"

== Other uses ==
- AUD, ISO 4217 currency code for the Australian dollar
- Aud, Missouri, a community in the United States
- Audley End railway station, Essex, England (National Rail station code AUD)
- Doctor of Audiology (Au.D.)
- Alcohol use disorder
- Aud Publishing, an imprint of VDM Publishing devoted to the reproduction of Wikipedia content
- KAUD (FM), a radio station in Mexico, Missouri
- WAUD, a radio station in Auburn, Alabama
- Auditing and Attestation in the Uniform Certified Public Accountant Examination
