= Stein Stugu =

Norwegian trade unionist

Stein Stugu (born 25 January 1953) is a Norwegian trade unionist and politician for the Red Electoral Alliance.

He grew up in Stabekk as a son of pianist Eva Sandvik Stugu.

He joined the Workers' Communist Party in the 1970s, and started his career at Frydenlunds Bryggeri in 1977. He later made a name as a trade unionist within the breweries system. In 1990 he became the employees' representative in the board of Ringnes, which bought Frydenlund, and later the Orkla Group since 1994 after it bought Ringnes. He left Orkla when it sold Ringnes in 2004, and then he also left Ringnes in 2006. In 2005 he lost a vote for secretary of the Norwegian Union of Food, Beverage and Allied Workers.

He was elected to Bærum municipal council in 1983 as the first representative of the Red Electoral Alliance. He was re-elected in 1987 and 1991, serving for twelve years. In 2005 he started working part-time in the union think tank De Facto. He has worked there full-time since 2007.
