= Per Inge Torkelsen =

Norwegian comedian, author, and politician (1953–2021)

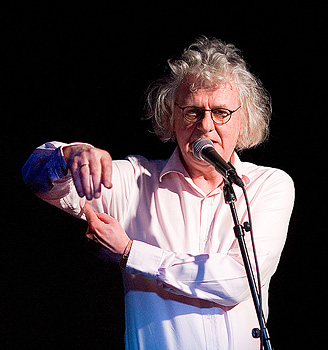
- Per Inge Torkelsen in "Stand Up Stavanger"
- Born: 21 March 1953; Stavanger, Norway
- Died: 22 June 2021 (aged 68); Radiumhospitalet, Oslo, Norway

Comedy career
- Genres: stand-up comedy, satire
- Subject: Norwegian society

Per Inge Torkelsen (21 March 1953 – 22 June 2021) was a Norwegian comedian, author, radio personality, and self declared clown. He was known for the Norwegian expression "Gi ungdommen en flaske brennevin før idretten tar dem" (English: Give the youth a bottle of liquor before they are lost to athletics). In 2007 he was elected into the city council in Stavanger for the Liberal Party of Norway. Between 2003 and 2007 he was the leader of the Eiganes og Våland borough council. He was listed as a clown in the telephone book.

== Biography ==
Born in Stavanger, Torkelsen was a trained teacher of English, but was most well known as a comedian. He had worked as a postman, scrap dealer, illusionist, and was the Norwegian champion of magic. He held talks for companies and was involved in debates. He was also the host of children's television programmes in Norway and for a time he had a permanent role as part of the long-running NRK program Norge rundt. Starting in 1980, he was a member of the municipality council in his home city of Stavanger. He was the leader of the Eiganes og Våland city district council for the Liberal Party of Norway.

He was only 15 years old when he was first noticed in the national media. He fooled all of Norway's archaeologists by placing five Chinese coins from the 10th century in an excavation field in Stavanger. At the end of the 1960s, Stavanger prison and some other buildings in the market area of Stavanger were torn down, and at the same time archaeologists were excavating. Stavanger museum sent out press releases about the find, and soon the discovery was known around the world. But after some time, Torkelsen contacted the regional newspaper Stavanger Aftenblad in order to tell the truth about the coins. Oddmund Møllerop, the director of the Stavanger archaeological museum at the time, said that Torkelsen had planted the coins in the perfect spot. The coins happened to be planted in a location where the age of the land that the archaeologists were excavating was precisely the same age as the coins. Had the coins been placed anywhere else in the excavation site, the archaeologists would have been able to tell that they were planted there.

Torkelsen was also known as a talented spokesperson for smokers and he played many times around with this theme. He was also known for collecting comic books and owned one of Norway's biggest collections with over 28,000 books. Most of them are displayed in the children's museum in Stavanger. In addition, he was known for the release of the books Den store stygge idrettsboka (English: The big ugly sports book), Den store norske begravelsesboka (English: The big Norwegian funeral book), Ikkje heilt rektige (English: Not altogether sane), and the controversial Den store, stygge eldreboka (English: The big, ugly book of the elderly). In addition to all this, he had success with the variety show group Løgnaslaget (together with Dag Schreiner and Steinar Lyse). The group has also released music.

Torkelsen was one of the founders of Den Store Norske Humorfestivalen (English: The Big Norwegian Comedy Festival).

Beginning in 2003, he was a permanent weekly radio columnist for the radio program Norgesglasset on NRK radio.

== Controversies ==
In 2000 there was much debate and resentment from the public when Torkelsen released the book Den store stygge eldreboka (English: The big ugly elderly book), which he initially wanted to call Drep de eldre (English: Kill the elderly). The book contains a bunch of negative characteristics of the elderly. Because of this he received death threats and was attacked on the street. In the same year, he reported regional newspaper Rogalands Avis to the police because of someone who wrote in to the newspaper urging pensionists to shoot Torkelsen. When the report was dismissed, he filed a complaint against the newspaper, but the paper was found not to be at fault. In the book, Torkelsen wrote, among other things, that pensioners who have too much money should pay for themselves, so that other pensioners without any income, single mothers, and families just starting out would have it better. Torkelsen said that there would be no requirement for them to do this, however. He also said that he expected to cause a stir after his confrontation with the conservatives among the elderly, but didn't expect death threats or physical attacks.

There was also controversy when he released one of his older books, Den store norske begravelsesboka in 1996. Earlier, in 1992, he released Den store stygge idrettsboka (English: The big ugly sports book), where he attacked sports. After publishing the book, he was sued by the javelin thrower Trine Hattestad because she thought that he had defamed her. The case was settled in court and Torkelsen said he was willing to pay 100,000 NOK in damages. In the same book he also made the statement "Give the kids alcohol before they get hooked on sports," which caused some controversy. However, despite his perceived hatred of sports, Torkelsen did in fact regularly attend the home games of his local football team Viking FK.

== Other engagements ==
In 2006, he was the master of ceremonies for the theatre festival in Sandnes where there were 13 different theatres. From the fall of 2006 until the spring of 2008 he was a director for Teaterverkstedet Ganddal in cooperation with Rogaland amateur theatre.

As a director for the theater company Teaterverkstedet Ganddal, he directed two pieces:

- Zapp på ein måde
- Pengane eller livet

These two performances were a huge success for both Torkelsen and Teaterverkstedet Ganddal.

== Bibliography ==
- 2016: ``Ka va det eg sa`` (Autobiography)
- 2006: Den store, stygge Per Inge (Humor)
- 2004: Ikkje heilt rektige (Autobiography)
- 2003: Gledelig røyk og godt nyttår (Humor)
- 2001: Det gjekk på engelsk og norsk
- 2000: Den store, stygge eldreboka (Humor)
- 1999: Den store norske doboka (Humor)
- 1999: Verdikollisjonen (Humor)
- 1998: O jul med din vrede (Humor)
- 1997: Fra Bethania til Texas. Stavanger i etterkrigstida (History, with John G. Johnsen)
- 1996: Den store norske begravelsesboka (Humor)
- 1994: Vitseboka for smore og stå (Humor)
- 1994: Forelska, forlova, forgifta, forvirra (Humor)
- 1993: Den store norske injurieboka (Humor)
- 1992: Den store stygge idrettsboka (Humor)
- 1992: Moroboka for smore og stå (Humor)
- 1991: Lause skrua (Humor)
- 1991: Blaute vitsar (Humor)
- 1990: Kva er vitsen (Humor)
- 1989: Den store norske doboka (Humor)
- 1989: Er det nokon vits? (Humor)
- 1988: Der e någe med alt (Humor)
- 1986: Det e løye med det (Humor)
