= Kirsti Blom =

Norwegian author

- Born: Hov, Søndre Land, Norway
- Occupation: Author; art photographer
- Genre: Novels, poetry, short stories, children's books (non-fiction)
- Years active: 1973–present

Kirsti Blom (born 1 May 1953) is a Norwegian author, raised in the village of Hov in Søndre Land Municipality.

== Career ==
She made her debut at the age of 20 in 1973 with the novel Bilde av et menneske (Picture of a Man). Blom has since written several novels, collections of poems and short storiesm, and a number of children's books, including non-fiction books about animals and nature in the Polarserien (Polar Series).

In 2007, Kirsti Blom and Kit M. Kovacs were nominated for the Brage Prize for the Polar Bear in the non-fiction class for children. In 2013, she was "longlisted" for the P2 listeners' novel prize for I saw everything.

The novel Kitten from 2003 is the story of a young Norwegian who goes to the Belgian Congo in the year 1900, and undergoes a development from a fairly innocent youth to an oppressor and abuser.

Several of her novels are about artists' relationship to themselves and the world around them. In 2013 she published a novel about the Spanish painter Francisco Goya, and in 2017 came the novel Av jord, which is about the painter Jean and his attempt to withdraw completely from the rest of the world in order to paint true.

Blom lives and writes periodically in Andalusia. Both the novel Jeg så alt (I Saw Everything; 2013) and the collection of poems Den første vanlige dagen (The First Ordinary Day; 2014) draw inspiration from Andalucía and Spain.

Her books have been translated into English, Arabic, Serbian, Macedonian and Spanish.

Kirsti Blom led the foreign work in the Norwegian Writers' Association when she was a board member there from 1990 to 1996. She has also been a board member of Norwegian PEN from 1994 to 2003, where she was deputy chairman in her last year. She has since been involved in, among other things, the North Norwegian author team.

Kirsti Blom is also a writer with contributions in newspapers and magazines. She is also an art photographer and has illustrated several of her own books.

Blom has lived in Tromsø and currently lives in Oslo.

== Bibliography ==
- 1972: Bilde av et menneske – novel
- 1979: Det er bare kjærligheten som ikke sover: en roman om Randsfjordkonflikten – novel
- 1984: Karameh – novel
- 1992: Marianne på Galdhøpiggen – picture book for children with photographs by Per Blom (published on Tiden in collaboration with the Norwegian Tourist Association)
- 1994: Breen – novel
- 1996: Delta – collection of poems illustrated with own photographs
- 2000: Flekker – novel (published in Serbian 2001, 2004)
- 2003: Kitten – novel
- 2003: Fjellreven – non-fiction, fact book for children (published in English as The Arctic Fox, 2004)
- 2005: Hvalrossen – non-fiction, fact book for children
- 2006: Den som svarer – novel
- 2007: Isbjørnen – non-fiction, fact book for children
- 2008: Snø, is og klima – non-fiction, fact book for children, Cappelen Damm
- 2009: Svalbardrypa – textbook for children and young people, Cappelen Damm
- 2010: Dyr i Arktis – textbook for children and young people, Cappelen Damm
- 2011: Sjøfuglene i Arktis – non-fiction, fact book for children, Cappelen Damm
- 2013: Jeg så alt: en roman om Francisco Goya – novel, October
- 2014: Den første vanlige dagen – collection of poems, October
- 2015: Hvitkinngåsa – textbook for children and young people, Cappelen Damm
- 2016: Søppelplasten i havet – Cappelen Damm
- 2017: Av jord – novel, October
- 2017: Snøugla – textbook for children and young people, Cappelen Damm
- 2018: Svalbardreinen – textbook for children and young people, Cappelen Damm
- 2019: Søppelplasten i havet – textbook for children and young people, Cappelen Damm
- 2019: Lemen – textbook for children and young people, Cappelen Damm
