= Elsa Lundanes =

Norwegian chemist (born 1953)

- Born: May 22, 1953 (age 73); Ålesund, Norway
- Education: University of Oslo; University of Texas
- Known for: Analytical chemistry
- Awards: Norwegian Academy of Science and Letters (2009)
- Scientific career
- Fields: Analytical chemistry
- Workplaces: University of Oslo; Nycomed

Elsa Lundanes (born 22 May 1953) is a Norwegian chemist.

She was born in Ålesund and took her cand.real. degree in 1978. After two years at Texas University she took the dr.scient. degree in 1986. She worked in the pharmaceutical industry for Nycomed before she was employed by the University of Oslo in 1988. Her specialty is analytical chemistry. She became professor in 1999 and a member of the Norwegian Academy of Science and Letters in 2009.
