= Ute de Lange Nilsen =

Czech-Norwegian jewelry artist and puppet maker (1931–2024)

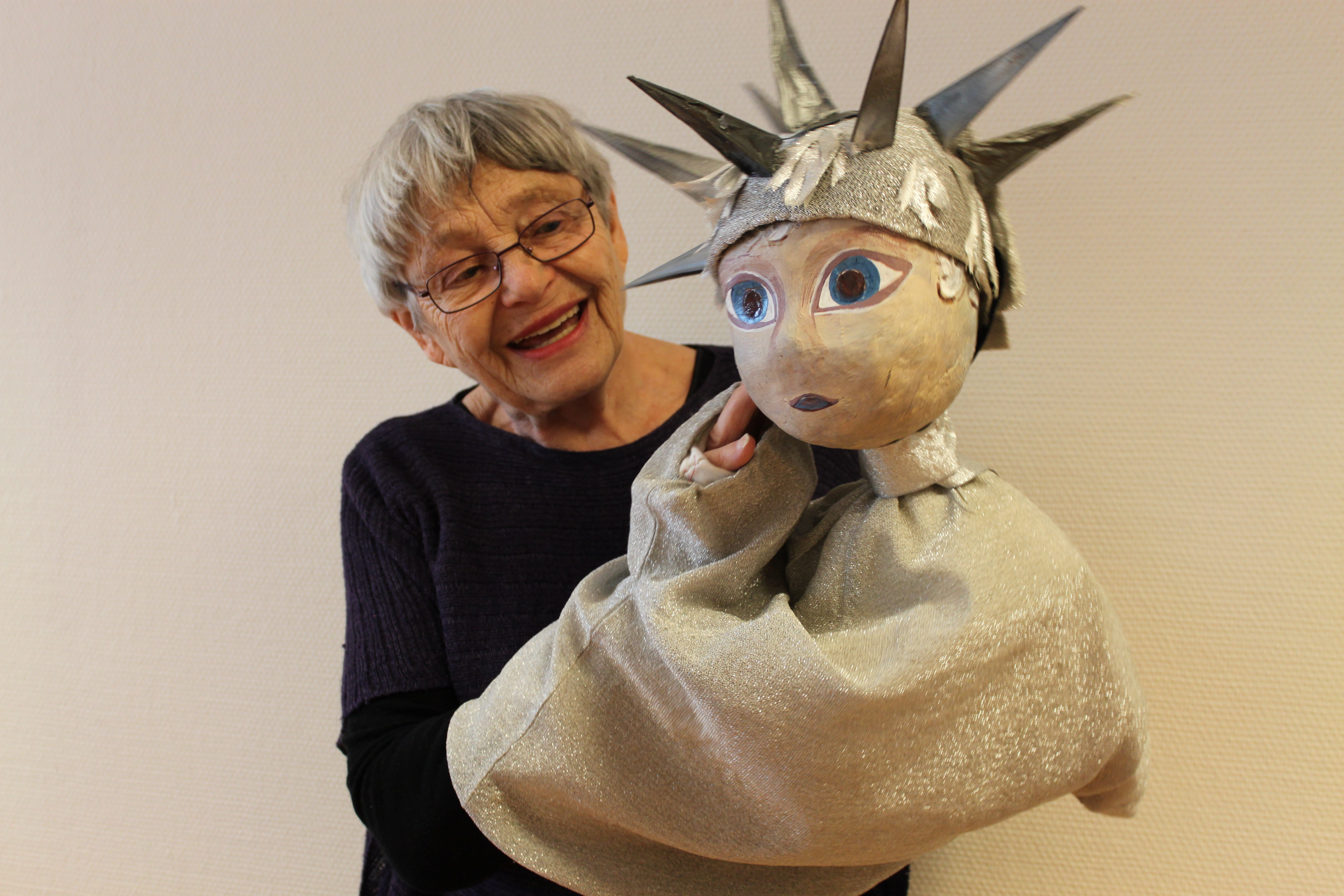
- Ute de Lange Nilsen with her puppet Solungen ('child of the sun')
- Born: August 2, 1931; Jablonec nad Nisou, Czechoslovakia
- Died: March 14, 2024 (aged 92)
- Occupations: Jewelry artist, puppet maker

Ute de Lange Nilsen Scharf (August 2, 1931 – March 14, 2024) was a Czech-Norwegian jewelry artist and puppet maker. She lived in Arendal.

== Biography ==
Ute de Lange Nilsen was born in Jablonec nad Nisou, Czechoslovakia. She studied in Germany from 1947 to 1950, where she obtained her journeyman certification as a goldsmith, and then at the College of Art and Crafts from 1948 to 1953.

She moved to Norway as a newly graduated goldsmith in 1953/54. There she worked for one year at the Holthe jewelry factory in Arendal, and then she moved back to Germany to obtain her master-tradesman's certificate in 1956. Later she returned to Arendal. There she had her own goldsmith workshop and several retail locations in the town. She participated in several exhibits, including the traveling exhibit Norwegian Arts and Crafts from Agder (Norske kunsthåndverkere Agder) in 1982, at the Lyngdal Art Society (Lyngdal kunstforening) in 1982, and at the Hillestad Gallery in Tovdal in 1987. In addition to working with jewelry, she created artworks in metal, stone, and enamel. People, faces, masks, geology, plants, and animals were among her many interests and inspirations.

She was also known for her puppet theater work, and she was active in Arendal's puppet theater and in the Arendal Drama Society (Arendal Dramatiske Selskab). She held many courses in puppet making and arranged puppet theater classes for children. The performance Den magiske kosten (The Magic Broom) in February 2013 was her 19th and last performance since the theater was established in the late 1960s.

Ute de Lange Nilsen was a member of the Norwegian Craftsmen's Association of South Norway (Norske kunsthåndverkere Sør-Norge) and the International Puppetry Association.
