= Arne Nævra =

Norwegian photographer and politician

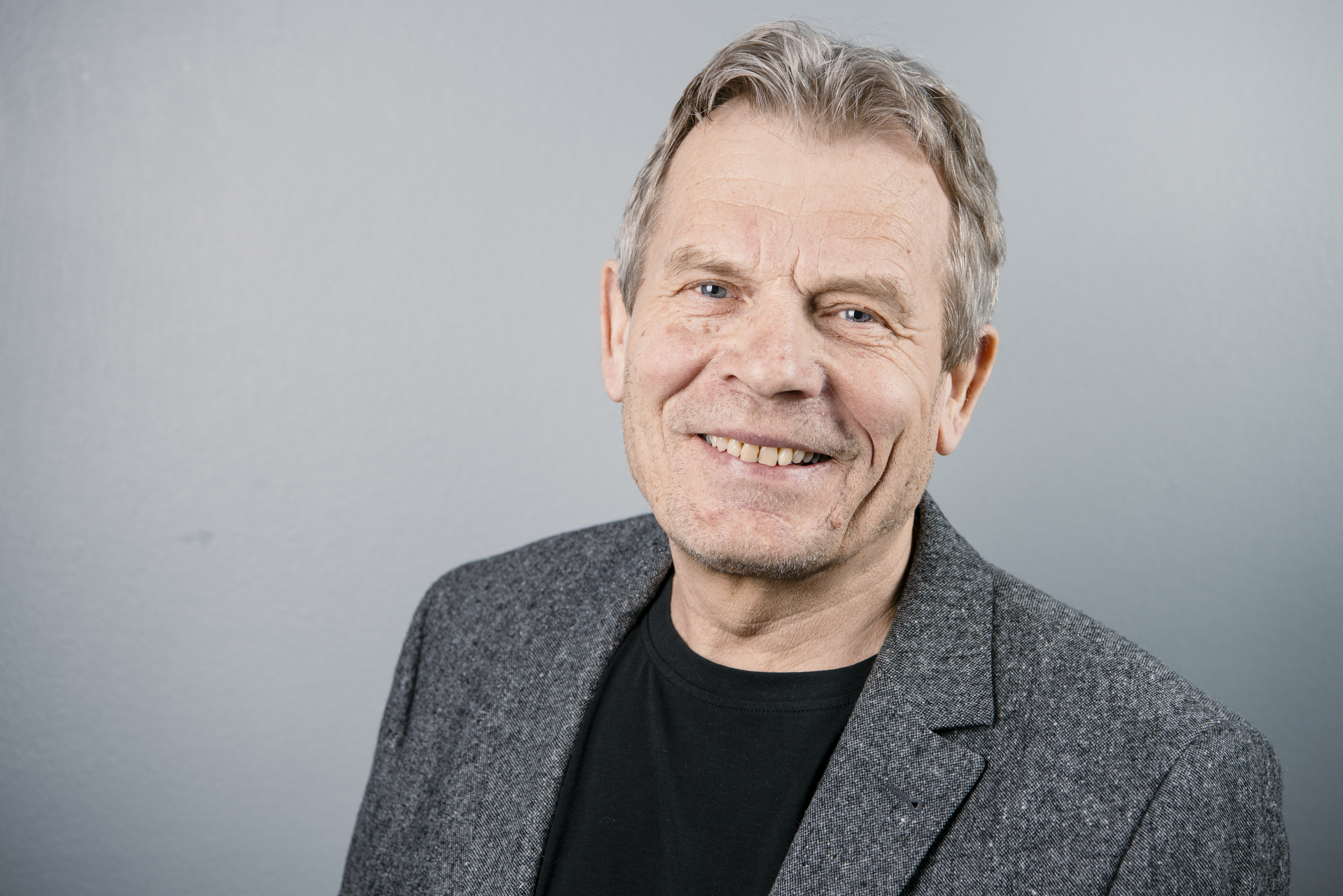
- Nævra in 2017
- Born: 7 December 1953 (age 72); Øvre Eiker, Norway
- Education: University of Oslo
- Occupations: photographer and politician
- Political party: Socialist Left Party

Arne Nævra (born 7 December 1953) is a Norwegian photographer and politician.

== Biography ==
Nævra was born in Øvre Eiker. He was elected representative to the Storting from Buskerud for the period 2017–2021 for the Socialist Left Party. He was a member of Buskerud county council from 1979 to 1983.

Nævra has studied biology and ecology at the University of Oslo, and is a nature photographer and film producer by profession. His books include Norske Rovdyr from 1997, Dyrene på Langedrag from 2001, and Villdyr og Villmark from 2010.

He was awarded Friluftslivets Hederspris in 2013.
