= Per Hannevold =

Norwegian musician

Per Hannevold, born 1953, is a member of the Bergen Woodwind Quintet and has been principal bassoon of the Bergen Philharmonic Orchestra since 1979. He was a member of the Norwegian Radio Orchestra (Kork) from 1974 till 1979. He is a professor at the Grieg Academy, University of Bergen. His repertoire includes all of the standard bassoon concerto and chamber music works, and Ruth Bakke’s Illuminations, John Williams’s The Five Sacred Trees, and Jean Françaix’s Concerto. Worldwide appearances include performances in Taiwan, Lithuania, and the Lincoln Center concert honoring the 50th Anniversary of the Universal Declaration of Human Rights. Mr. Hannevold has presented master classes internationally and has served as a juror at bassoon competitions in Finland, France, Lithuania, Latvia, and the U.S. He has been a faculty member of the Aspen Music Festival and School since 1993. The spring of 2016 he celebrated 25 years of the Nordic Bassoon Symposium in Bergen, Norway. He studied with Arnulf Brachel in Oslo, Knut Sønstevold in Stockholm, and in the United States with Harold Goltzer and Louis Skinner. Mr. Hannevold’s latest CD, the highly acclaimed Music for Per includes Lassen’s Strange Interlude No. 3 in which he imitates rock-guitar riffs, as well as works by David Maslanka and Oivind Westby. He has studied conducting with Aldo Ceccato and Sergiu Celibidache.
