= Nina Bjerkedal =

Norwegian civil servant (born 1953)

Nina Bjerkedal (born 24 April 1953) is a Norwegian civil servant.

She graduated as siv.øk. from the Norwegian School of Economics and Business Administration in 1975, worked for a short period as research assistant under Finn Kydland before starting a career in the Ministry of Finance. She is currently deputy under-secretary of State in the Ministry of Finance, being in charge of the Government Pension Fund – Global.
