= Kjell Terje Fevåg =

Norwegian politician (born 1953)

- Born: 2 March 1953 (age 73); Kristiansund, Norway
- Occupation: Politician

Kjell Terje Fevåg (born 2 March 1953) is a Norwegian politician.

He was elected deputy representative to the Storting for the periods 1989–1993, 1993–1997 and 1997–2003 for the Labour Party. He replaced Ottar Kaldhol at the Storting from October 1993 to January 1994, when Kaldhol served as state secretary.
