= Magne Helvig =

Norwegian physicist

Magne Helvig (28 December 1926 – 18 January 2024) was a Norwegian geographer.

He was born in Egersund as a son of a carpenter. Originally meant to follow the same line of work, he was injured in a work accident in the 1940s, which opened an academic path for him. He finished his secondary education in 1948 and graduated with the cand.philol. degree from the University of Oslo in 1955.

Given a Fulbright scholarship, he studied at the University of Texas for one year before returning to Norway. He was a planner in Oslo Municipality and a research director at the Institute of Transport Economics, then went to the US a second time as a research fellow. He finished the PhD at the University of Chicago in 1964 with the thesis Chicago's External Truck Movements: Spatial Interactions Between the Chicago Area and Its Hinterland.

Helvig was subsequently appointed as a docent of geography at the University of Oslo. He then became a professor at the University of Bergen in 1970. He was inducted into the Norwegian Academy of Science and Letters in 1971.

Helvig left academia in 2005, pursuing hobbies such as painting and carpentry. He died in January 2024, aged 97.
