= Peter Ørebech =

Norwegian legal scholar

Peter Thomas Ørebech (11 March 1948 – 11 January 2024) was a Norwegian legal scholar and politician for the Centre Party.

Ørebech was a professor of law at the University of Tromsø, specializing in fisheries law and maritime law.

He was elected as a deputy representative to the Parliament of Norway from Troms for the term 2009–2013, and met during 3 days of parliamentary session. He was active in the organization against Norwegian membership in the EU, Nei til EU, and contributed to Norges Kystfiskarlag.

Ørebech died at Ullevål Hospital in January 2024, aged 75, leaving behind a wife and four children.
