= Sverre M. Fjelstad =

Norwegian zoologist and photographer (1930–2024)

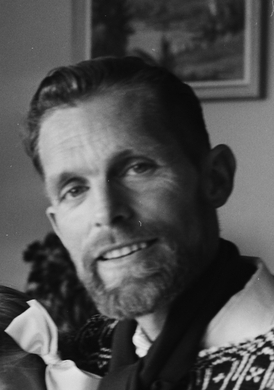
- Born: 17 October 1930; Oslo, Norway
- Died: 28 May 2024 (aged 93)
- Occupation(s): Zoologist, photographer, non-fiction writer and producer for radio and television
- Employer: NRK

Sverre Martin Fjelstad (17 October 1930 – 28 May 2024) was a Norwegian zoologist, photographer, non-fiction writer and producer for radio and television. He is probably best known to the public for the series Naturmagasinet, which was aired by the Norwegian Broadcasting Corporation between 1966 and 1974.

== Personal life ==
Born in Oslo on 17 October 1930, Fjelstad was a son of Sverre Henrik Fjelstad, a real estate broker, and his wife Asta Fjelstad. He was married to Anne Kathrin Dahl.

Fjelstad died on 28 May 2024, at the age of 93.

== Selected works ==
- Med nebb og klør. 1961.
- På kloss hold. 1962.
- Nattens jegere. 1963. (novel)
- Det fløy en fugl – på fotojakt i skog og mark. 1964.
- Ville venner. 1965.
- Fuglefløyt og dyretråkk. 1966.
- Naturmagasinet. 1971.
- Nye naturmagasinet. Fra Korpåsen til Kilimanjaro. 1973.
- Dyrenes land – Afrika. 1975.
- Dyr omkring oss. 1977.
- Naturen rundt oss. 1979.
- Ville dyr hjemme og ute. 1981.
- Ville dyr i skogen. Skogen har mange hemmeligheter. 1987.
- Afrika i speilrefleks. På safari. 1992.
- Dyrene i skogen. 1993.
- Østmarka naturreservat. Oslos siste villmark. 1994.
- Fuglene i skogen. 1996.
- Spor og sportegn. 1997.
- På tur!. 1999.
- I skogen – året rundt. 2000.
- Dyrenes forunderlige verden. 2002.
- Mitt liv i villmarka. 2006.
