= Harald Arnljot Øye =

Norwegian chemist (1935–2024)

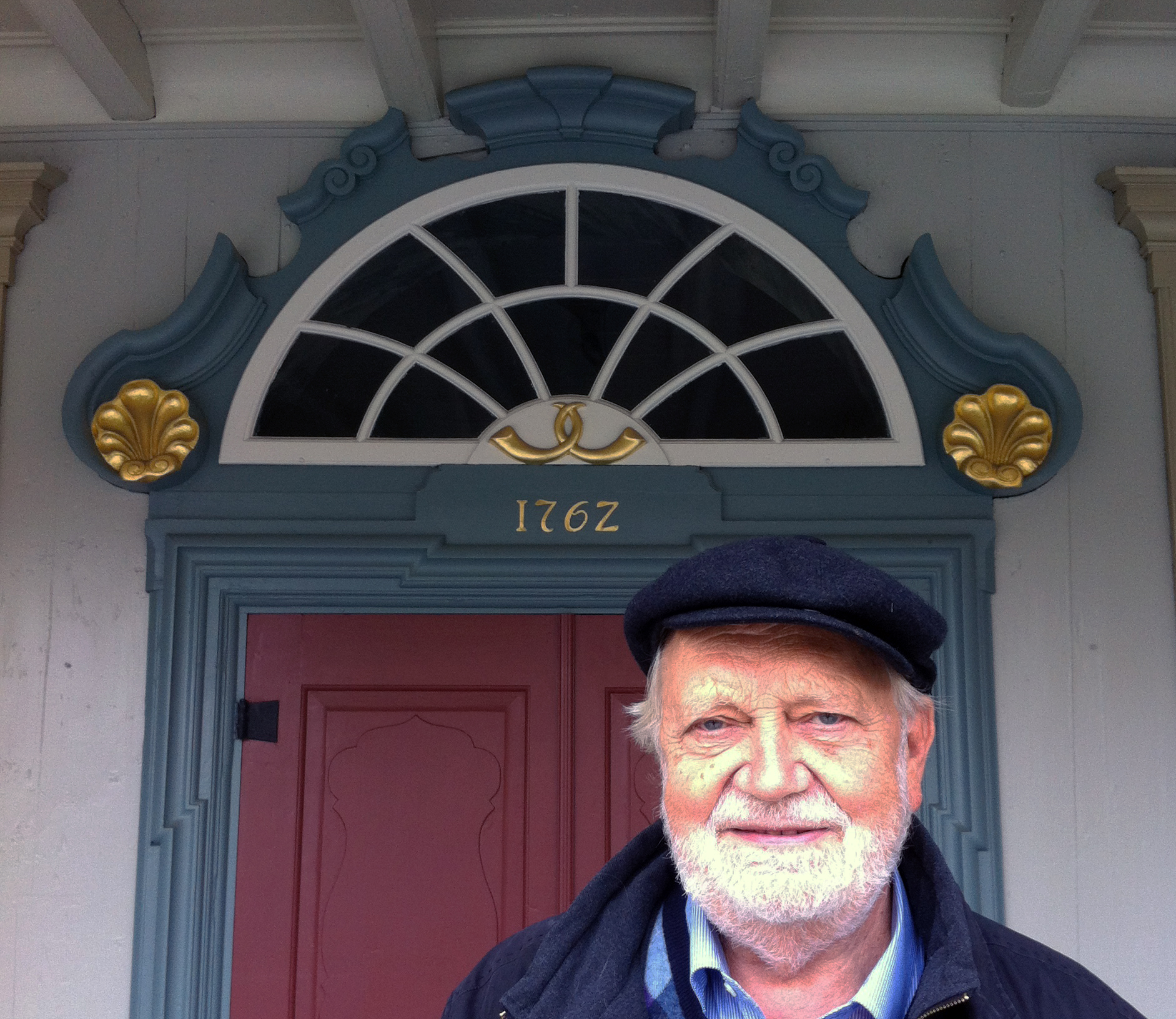

Harald Arnljot Øye (1 February 1935 – 7 October 2024) was a Norwegian chemist.

== Biography ==
Øye took the dr.techn. degree in 1963. He was a professor of inorganic chemistry at the Norwegian Institute of Technology from 1973 to his retirement. He has also led the International Course on Process Metallurgy of Aluminium since 1981. He was a fellow of the Norwegian Academy of Science and Letters and the Norwegian Academy of Technological Sciences. In November 2016, FLOGEN Star Outreach awarded him the Fray International Sustainability Award at SIPS 2016 (Sustainable Industrial Processing Summit), in Hainan Island, China. Øye died on 7 October 2024, at the age of 89.
