= Schneller =

Schneller may refer to:

== People ==
- Abba Hushi, né Schneller (1898–1969), Israeli politician
- Ernst Schneller (1890–1944), German school teacher, politician and concentration camp victim
- George C. Schneller (? – 2000), Anglican Orthodox bishop and metropolitan
- Johanna Schneller, Canadian film journalist and television personality
- John Benjamin Schneller (1911–1978), American football player
- Lajos Reményi-Schneller (1892–1946), Hungarian politician
- Oliver Schneller (born 1966), German composer and saxophonist
- Otniel Schneller (born 1952), Israeli politician

== Other ==
- Schneller Orphanage, a German Protestant orphanage in Jerusalem from 1860 until World War II, afterwards known as Camp Schneller
- Schneller (crater), a lunar crater
- 1782 Schneller, an asteroid
- Dein Herz schlägt schneller, a song performed by a German hip hop band Fünf Sterne Deluxe
- Marka refugee camp, Jordan, sometimes called "Schneller camp"
