= Aud Folkestad =

Norwegian politician (born 1953)

Aud Folkestad (born 10 February 1953) is a Norwegian politician for the Liberal Party.

She was a deputy representative to the Norwegian Parliament from Møre og Romsdal during the term 1997–2001. In total she met during 8 days of parliamentary session.

== See also ==
- Politics of Norway
