= Olav Berstad =

Norwegian diplomat

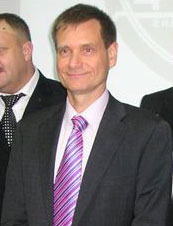
Olav Berstad

Olav Berstad (born 19 September 1953) is a Norwegian diplomat.

He was born in Tromsø, and is a cand.mag. by education. He started working for the Norwegian Ministry of Foreign Affairs in 1980. After serving as sub-director from 1996 to 1998, he was the Norwegian ambassador to Azerbaijan from 1998 to 2001, and to Ukraine from 2006 to 2011. Since May 2013 he has been the board chair of Tangen V home owner's association in Nesodden, Akershus, Norway.
