= Aud Voss Eriksen =

Norwegian politician (1937–2024)

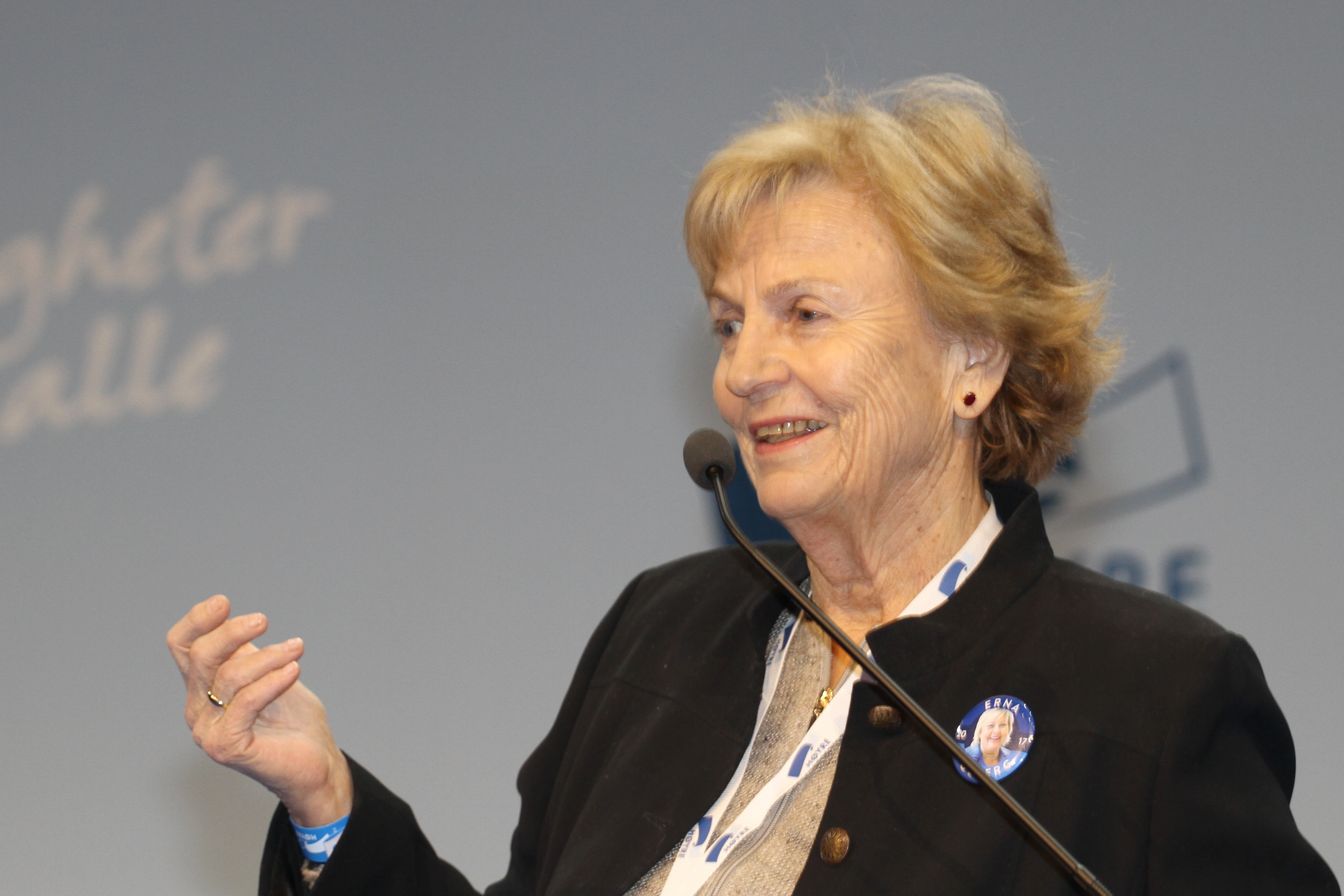
Voss Eriksen in 2017

Aud Voss Eriksen (4 May 1937 – 8 November 2024) was a Norwegian politician for the Conservative Party.

== Life and career ==
Eriksen was born and grew up in Oslo, but moved to Stavanger where she finished her secondary education. She studied science at the University of Oslo, and was hired as chief chemist for Exxon in Bangkok. She lived in Thailand and the United States for twelve years before moving to Bærum.

She started her political career as leader of the Bærum Conservative Women's Association, and advanced to county leader in Akershus. She was elected to Bærum municipal council in 1983. She was elected as a deputy representative to the Parliament of Norway from Akershus for the terms 1981–1985, 1985–1989 and 1989–1993. In total she met during 22 days of parliamentary session. In 1990 she was selected as chairperson of Bærum Conservative Party. From 1991 to 1999 she served as deputy mayor of Bærum, before retiring from politics. She also chaired the Henie-Onstad Art Centre from 1996 to 1999.

Eriksen resided at Jar and later at Fossum. She was married and had three children. Eriksen died on 8 November 2024, at the age of 87.
