= Elisabeth Kværne =

Norwegian musician (1953–2024)

Elisabeth Kværne (31 August 1953 – 12 September 2024) was a Norwegian musician. She played the langeleik, a string instrument similar to the Appalachian dulcimer. She won the 1985 Spellemannprisen in the category folk music and old dance for På langeleik. Kværne died on 12 September 2024, at the age of 71.

== See also ==
- Music of Norway
