= Magnus Skåden =

Norwegian politician

Magnus Skåden (born 5 July 1953) is a Norwegian politician for the Labour Party.

He served as a deputy representative to the Norwegian Parliament from Hordaland during the term 1997–2001.

Outside politics he is the manager of an entrepreneur company. He is a former board chairman of the Helse Fonna, a health trust under the Western Norway Regional Health Authority.
