= Odd Kristian Reme =

Norwegian priest and politician (1953–2024)

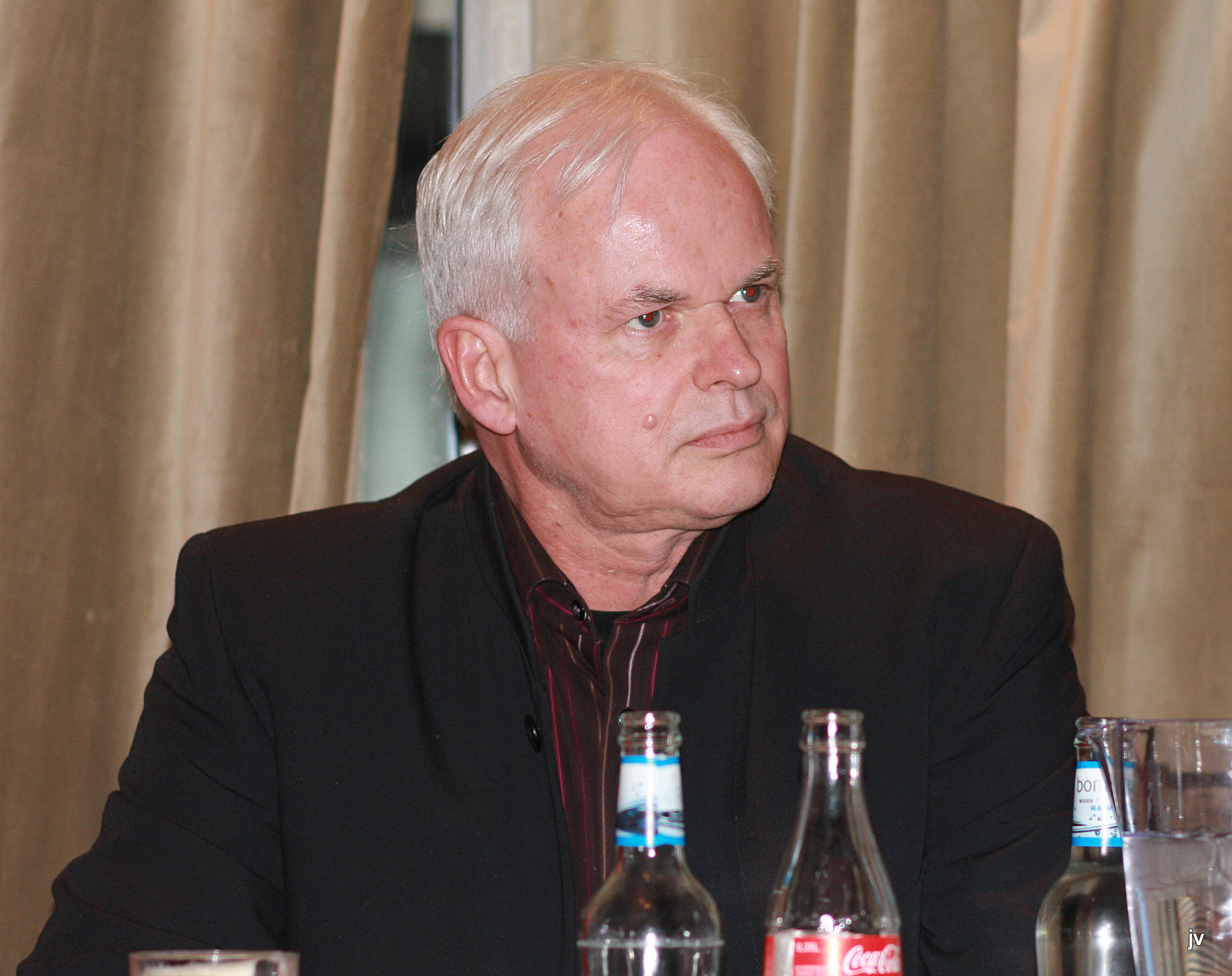
- Born: 8 March 1953; Brooklyn, New York, U.S.
- Died: 17 July 2024 (aged 71)
- Occupations: Priest and politician
- Political party: Labour

Odd Kristian Reme (8 March 1953 – 17 July 2024) was a Norwegian priest and politician.

== Life and career ==
Born in Brooklyn on 15 August 1953, Reme was educated as priest, and was the first leader of the diaconal foundation Church City Mission in Stavanger.

A politician for the Labour Party, he was elected member of the Stavanger city council, and he was also a member of the Labour Party central committee from 2000 to 2011.

By chairing the victims committee, he was a long-term proponent for deeper investigation into the 1980 capsize of the semi-submersible platform Alexander L. Kielland.

Reme died on 17 July 2024, at the age of 71.
