= Kari Ingulstad Botterud =

Norwegian politician (1943–2024)

Kari Ingulstad Botterud (7 March 1943 – 1 August 2024) is a Norwegian dentist and politician for the Centre Party.

She was elected as a deputy representative to the Parliament of Norway from Østfold for the terms 1989–1993 and 1993–1997. In total she met during 59 days of parliamentary session. Locally, she was a member of Skiptvet municipal council and the Østfold county health and social board. In 1987 she was proposed, but ultimately rejected as leader of the county health and social board. She was also a member of the regional college board of Østfold for five years.

She graduated in dentistry in Tübingen in 1969, and worked as a school dentist in Ski from 1970 to 1978 and then district dentist in Askim. She resided at Heiestad in Skiptvet.
