= Fanny Schnelle =

Norwegian politician (1866–1953)

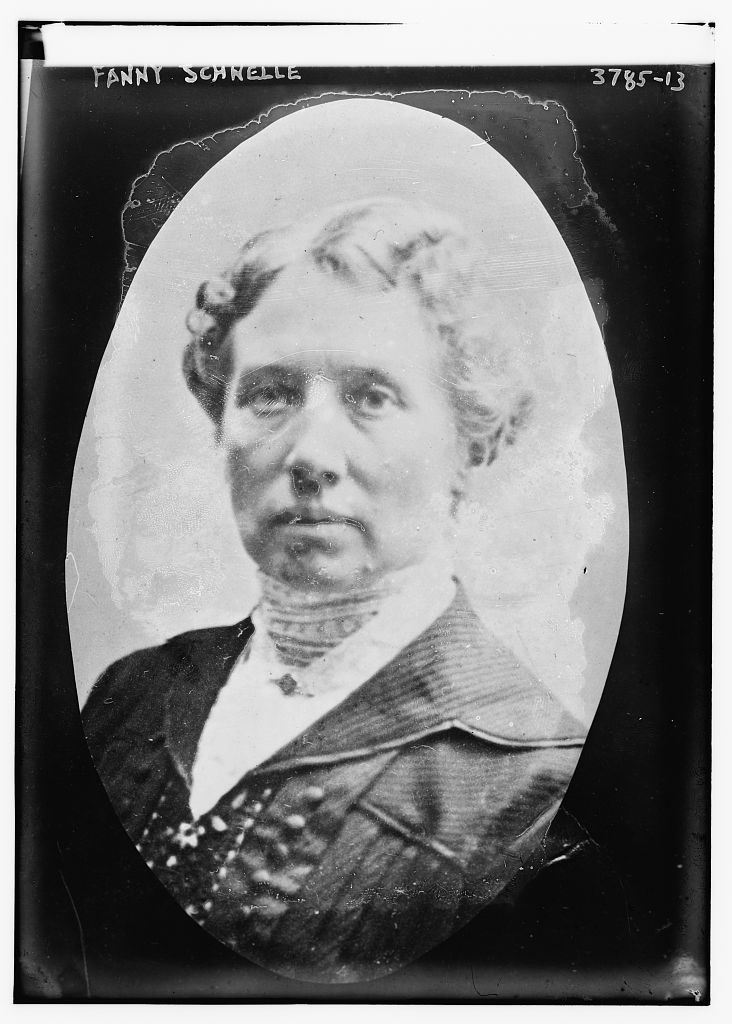
Fanny Schnelle in 1915

Fanny Schnelle (30 November 1866 – 31 January 1953) was a Norwegian politician for the Liberal Left Party, women's rights advocate, teacher and humanitarian.

== Biography ==
Schnelle chaired the Bergen chapter of the Norwegian Association for Women's Rights for 25 years and served as vice president of the Norwegian National Women's Council 1910–1919 and 1925–1929. She was a member of the executive board of the Liberal Left Party from 1910 to 1915. She represented the party in the city council and city government of Bergen, and was the first woman to serve in the city government. She stood for parliamentary election in 1930, albeit as a minor ballot candidate for her party.

Schnelle was actively involved in humanitarian relief work for children and was a member of several committees. From 1912 Schnelle was a national board member of Norges husflidsraad. In 1932 she became an honorary member of the Norwegian National Women's Council.

She was also known for donating a substantial gift to the chemistry department of the University of Bergen.

In 1936 she was decorated with the King's Medal of Merit in gold. She died in January 1953 and was buried in Møllendal. A relief of her was unveiled in Bergen in 1956.
