= Ruth Kleppe Aakvaag =

Norwegian politician (1938–2024)

Member of the Storting for Hordaland
- In office 16 October 1989 – 3 November 1990

Personal details
- Born: 5 August 1938 Bergen, Norway
- Died: 4 December 2024 (aged 86)
- Party: H
- Education: University of Bergen
- Occupation: Biochemist

Ruth Kleppe Aakvaag (5 August 1938 – 4 December 2024) was a Norwegian politician. A member of the Conservative Party, she served in the Storting from 1989 to 1990.

Aakvaag died on 4 December 2024, at the age of 86.
