= Aud Marit Wiig =

Norwegian diplomat (born 1953)

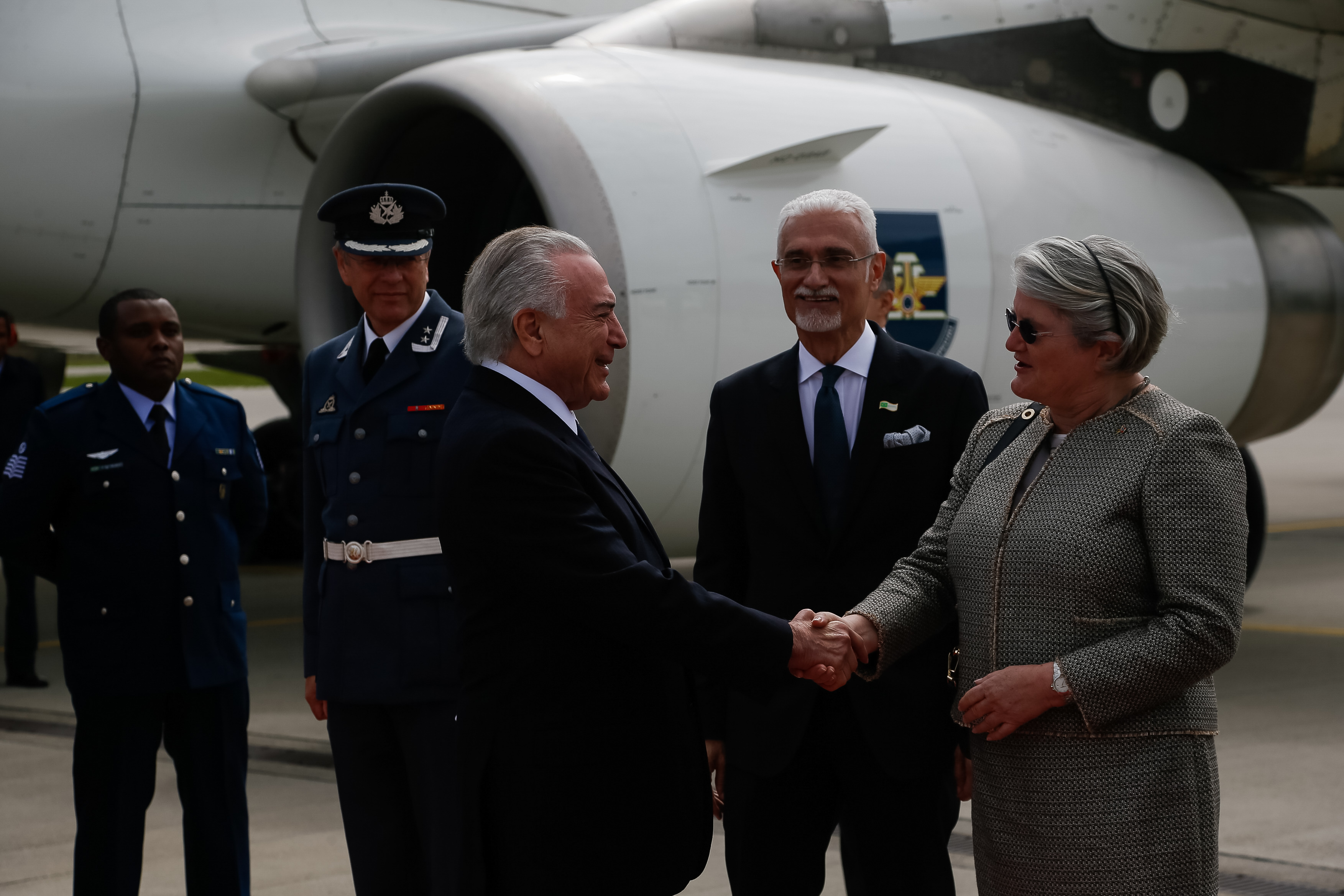
Aud Marit Wiig on the right (2017)

Aud Marit Wiig (born 29 July 1953) is a Norwegian diplomat.

She was born in Mandal, and was a cand.philol. by education. She started working for the Norwegian Ministry of Foreign Affairs in 1983. She served in the Norwegian embassy in Pretoria from 1996 to 2001, and as head of department in the Ministry of Foreign Affairs from 2001 to 2004. From 2004 to 2007 she was the executive director of the African Development Bank. She then served as the Norwegian ambassador to Pakistan from 2007 to 2008, and as deputy under-secretary of state in the Ministry of Foreign Affairs from 2009.
