= Bjarte Tørå =

Norwegian politician

Bjarte Tørå (born 20 May 1953) is a Norwegian politician for the Christian Democratic Party.

He served as a deputy representative to the Norwegian Parliament from Telemark during the terms 1981–1985 and 1985–1989. He is a former secretary of international affairs in the Christian Democratic Party. Hailing from Nordagutu, he has also been involved in local politics.

He later worked for the National Democratic Institute, as country director in Kenya.
