= 2026 in Norway =

- Centuries: 19th; 20th; 21st
- Decades: 2000s; 2010s; 2020s
- See also: List of years in Norway

Events in the year 2026 in Norway.

== Incumbents ==
- Monarch – Harald V (until 28 August); Haakon VIII (since 28 August).
- Prime Minister – Jonas Gahr Støre (Labour).
- President of the Storting – Masud Gharahkhani (Labour).

== Events ==
=== January ===
- 15 January–1 February – 2026 European Men's Handball Championship in Denmark, Norway, and Sweden.
- 26 January – Two executives of Hemla Africa Holding, a subsidiary of energy firm PetroNor E&P, are charged with paying $25 million in bribes to Republic of Congo President Denis Sassou Nguesso and his family.

=== February ===
- 1 February – Marius Borg Høiby is arrested on charges of assault, threats with a knife and violation of a restraining order.
- 6–22 February – Norway at the 2026 Winter Olympics
- 8 February – Mona Juul resigns as ambassador to Jordan after she and her husband, Terje Rød-Larsen, are named in the Epstein files.
- 12 February – Former prime minister Thorbjørn Jagland is charged with "gross corruption" after being named in the Epstein files.

=== March ===
- 8 March – An explosion occurs at the US embassy in Oslo, causing minor damage to the complex. Three brothers are subsequently arrested on suspicion of involvement.
- 15 March – Sentimental Value, directed by Joachim Trier, wins the Academy Award for Best International Feature Film at the 2026 Oscars, the first Norwegian film to do so.
- 26 March – The Storting passes a bill temporarily cutting petrol and diesel taxes in response to surging energy costs amid the 2026 Strait of Hormuz crisis.

=== May ===
- 22–24 May – 2026 UEFA Women's Champions League final

=== June ===
- 5 June – Crown Princess Mette-Marit suspends her official duties after being placed on a lung transplant list due to her pulmonary fibrosis.
- 11 June–19 July – Norway participates at the 2026 FIFA World Cup.
- 15 June – Marius Borg Høiby, the son of Crown Princess Mette-Marit, is convicted of 34 criminal charges by the Oslo District Court, including two counts of rape, domestic violence, assault, drug possession and supply, and restraining order violations. He is sentenced to four years' imprisonment.
- 17 June – The Royal Palace says that Crown Princess Mette-Marit underwent a lung transplant surgery at the Oslo University Hospital.
- 19 June — The government announces a near ban on generative AI tools for pupils in primary education, with restricted use in lower secondary education, and structured AI training in upper secondary education. The policy is to be implemented from late August 2026.

=== July ===
- 17 July — Krokstadelva fire: The largest residential fire in the country's modern history breaks out in Drammen, destroying more than 100 homes.
- 24 July – The United States imposes a 12.5% tariff on Norway, citing the presence of alleged forced labor in the supply chain.

=== August ===
- 24 August — A cyberattack claimed by pro-Russian hackers is carried out on multiple government agencies.
- 28 August — King Harald V dies at Oslo University Hospital, Rikshospitalet and is succeeded by his son, Haakon VIII.

=== September ===
- 8 September — Norway sanctions products from Israeli settlements in the West Bank. (Note: However, Norway clarified that settlement trade restrictions are contingent on EU action.)
- 9 September — The state funeral of King Harald V is held in Oslo.
- 24 September — Norway pledges an additional 125 million Norwegian kroner ($13.17 million) in aid to Palestine, bringing overall assistance to the country to almost 1 billion Norwegian kroner in that year.

=== October ===
- 4 October – Two people are killed in a shooting during a hunting party near Halden.

== Holidays ==
- 1 January – New Year's Day
- 2 April – Maundy Thursday
- 3 April – Good Friday
- 5 April – Easter Sunday
- 6 April – Easter Monday
- 1 May – Labour Day
- 14 May – Ascension Day
- 17 May – Constitution Day
- 24 May – Pentecost
- 25 May – Whit Monday
- 24 December – Christmas Eve
- 25 December – Christmas Day
- 26 December – 2nd Day of Christmas

== Deaths ==
=== January ===
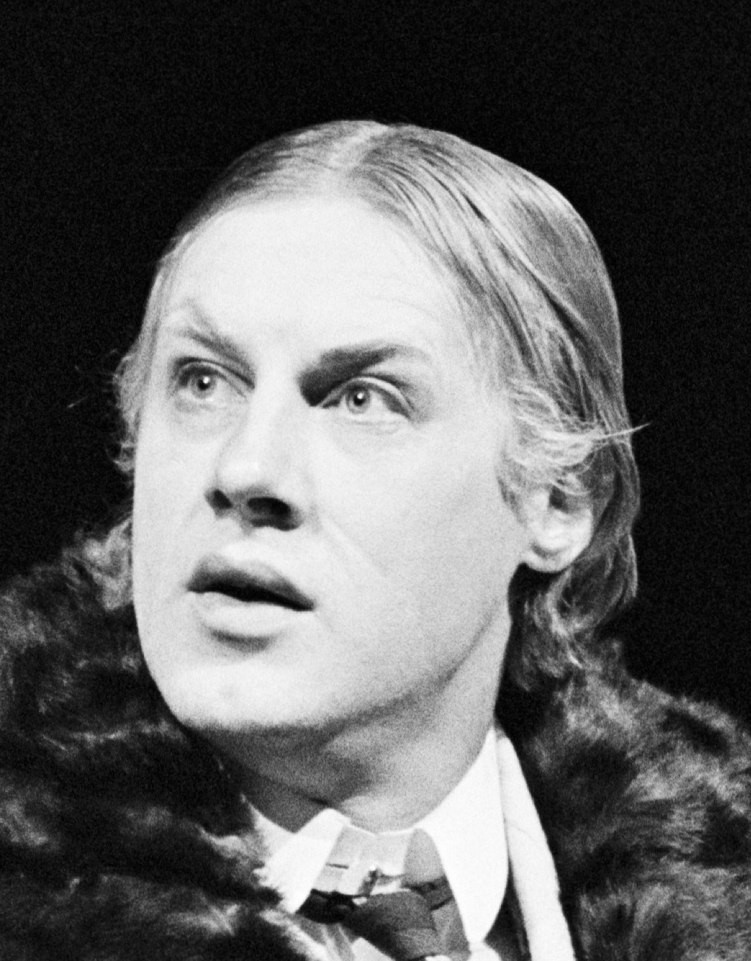
Sverre Anker Ousdal

- 4 January – Sverre Anker Ousdal, actor (born 1944).
- 8 January – Kjersti Scheen, writer and illustrator (born 1943).
- c.11 January – Grete Salomonsen, film director (born 1951).
- 24 January – Stål Aanderaa, mathematician (born 1931).
- 28 January – Rune E. Kristiansen, politician (born 1948).
- c.28 January – Amina Sewali, musician and actress (born 1989).
- 29 January – Stig Millehaugen, convicted murderer (born 1969).

=== February ===
- 3 February – Janken Varden, theatre director (born 1938).
- 4 February – Kari Garmann, politician (born 1945).
- 4 February – Bjørn Lofterød, sailor (born 1949).
- 7 February – Kåre Grøttum, jazz musician (born 1934).
- 14 February – Ivar Bjørklund, anthropologist and writer (born 1949).
- 15 February – Roger Hverven, handball player (born 1944).
- 18 February – Svein Jarvoll, writer (born 1946).
- 22 February – Kaare Aksnes, astronomer (born 1938).
- 24 February – Petter Bjørheim, politician (born 1965).
- 25 February – Petter Planke, businessman (born 1936).
- 26 February – Bjarte Baasland, convicted fraudster (born 1974).

=== March ===
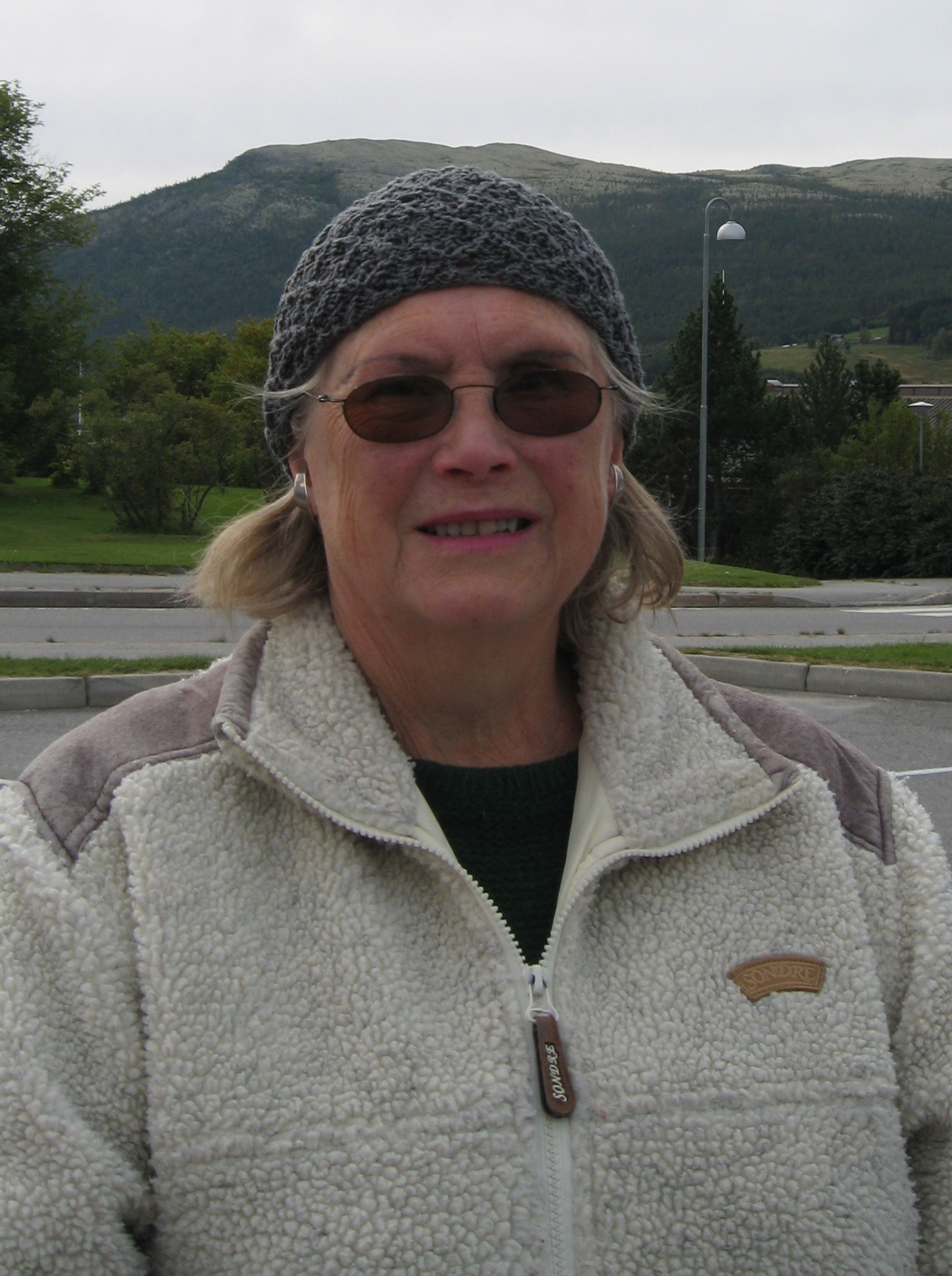
Unni-Lise Jonsmoen

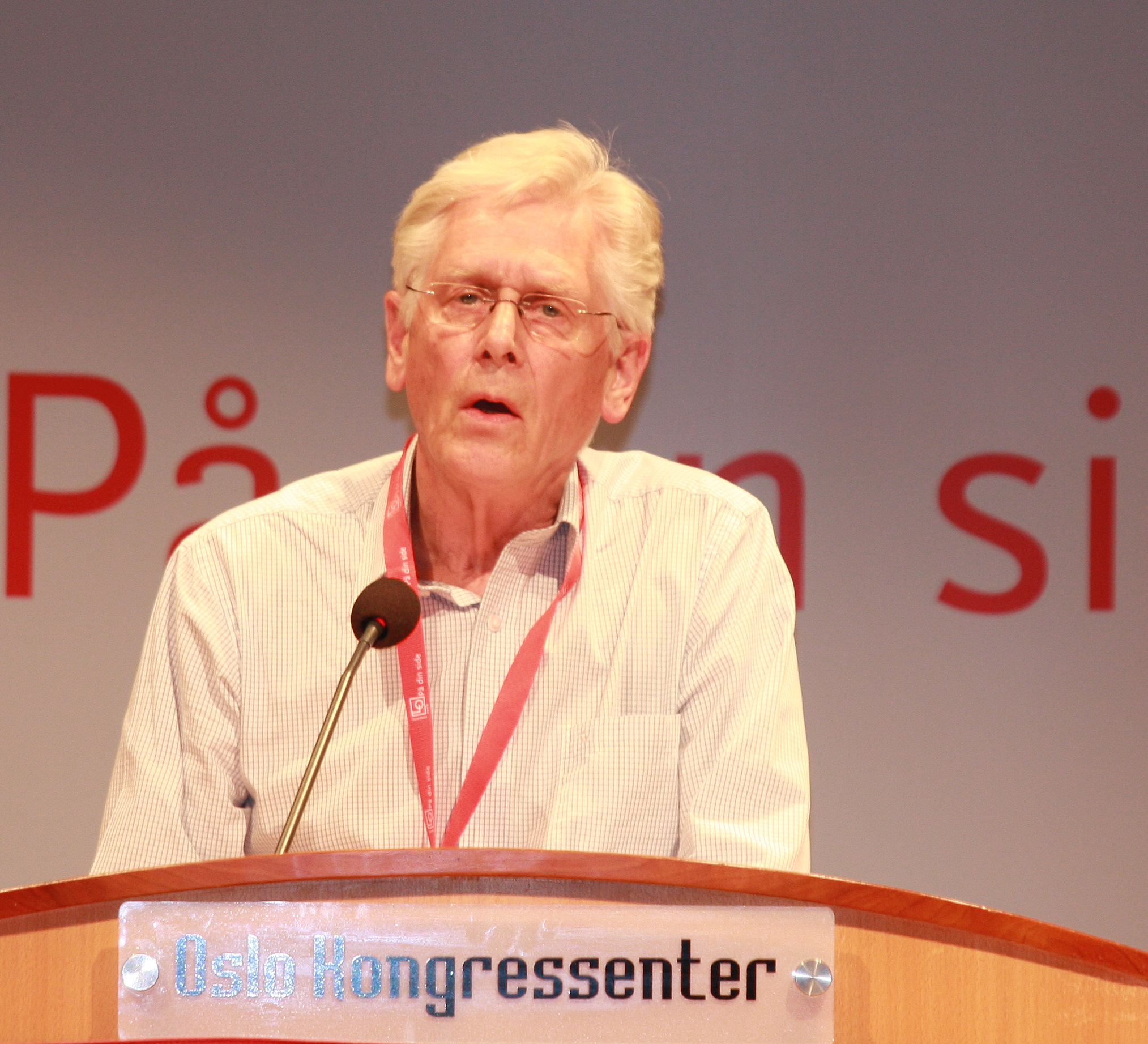
Kleiv Fiskvik

- 1 March – Dagfinn Føllesdal, philosopher (born 1932).
- 3 March – Unni-Lise Jonsmoen, illustrator (born 1936).
- 14 March – Odd Holten, politician (born 1940).
- 16 March – Bjørn Nilsen, poet and journalist (born 1934).
- 18 March – Jan Smedslund, psychologist (born 1929).
- 18 March – Finn-Erik Vinje, philologist (born 1936).
- 21 March – Kleiv Fiskvik, trade unionist (born 1943).
- 22 March – Per Hegna, tennis player (born 1945).
- 25 March – John Andreassen, television producer (born 1943).
- 25 March – Tordis Ørjasæter, writer and literary critic (born 1927).
- 29 March – Willy Ustad, writer (born 1946).
- 30 March – Knut Midgaard, political scientist (born 1931).
- 31 March – Siri Aurdal, sculptor (born 1937).

=== April ===
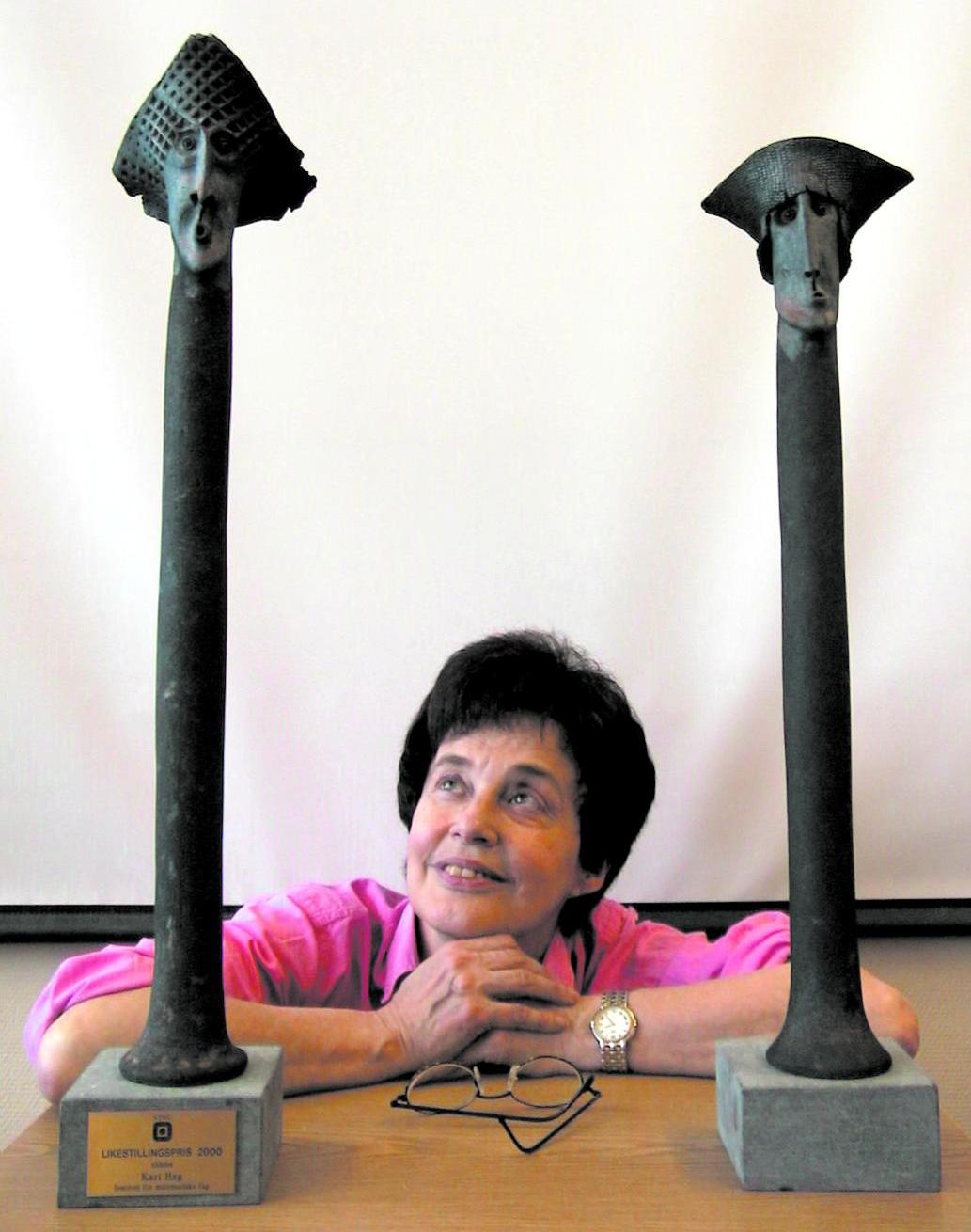
Kari Hag

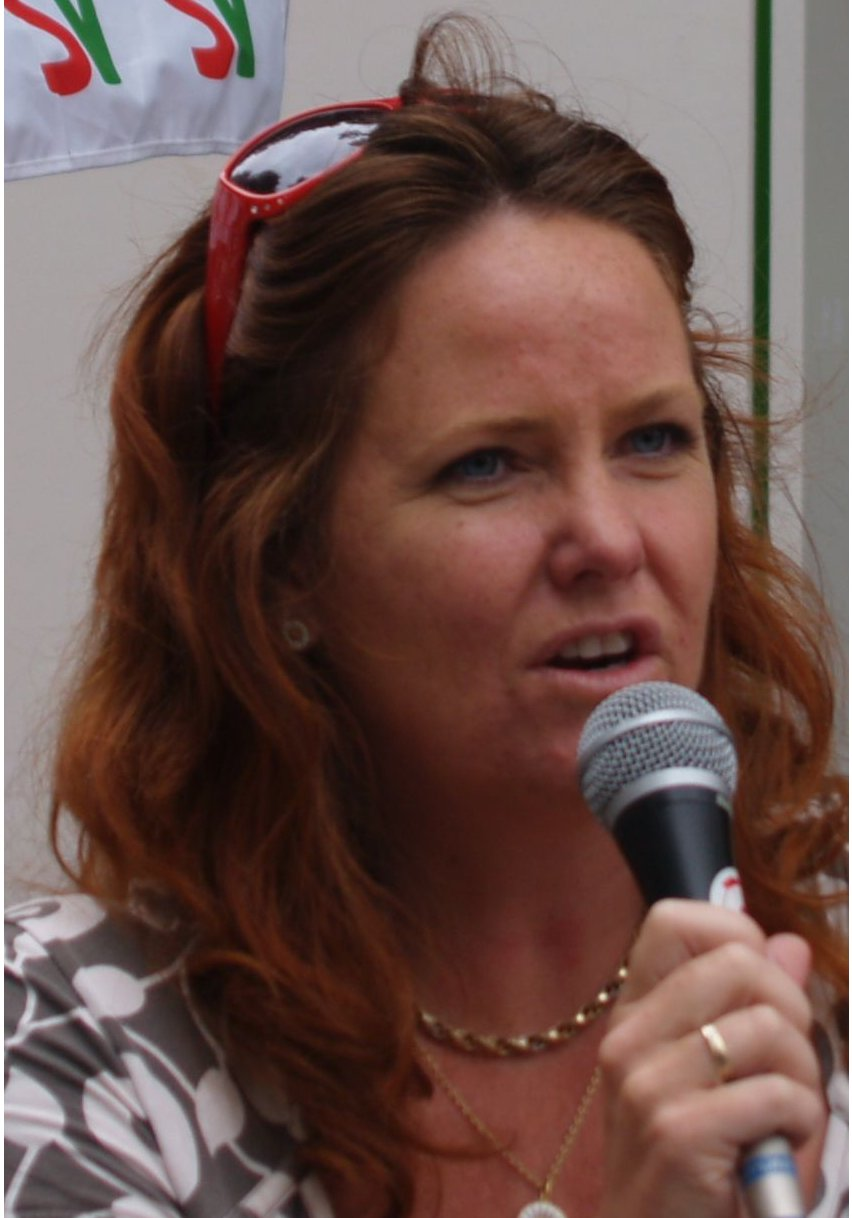
Heidi Sørensen

- 2 April – Trygve Berge, alpine skier (born 1932).
- 6 April – Brit Solli, archaeologist (born 1959).
- 7 April – Eva Ramm, writer and psychologist (born 1925).
- 8 April – Eldrid Nordbø, civil servant and politician (born 1942).
- 15 April – Kari Hag, mathematician (born 1941).
- 16 April – Pete Knutsen, musician (born 1947).
- 22 April – Kjell Syversen, journalist and script writer (born 1926 or 1927).
- 25 April – Heidi Sørensen, politician (born 1970).

=== May ===
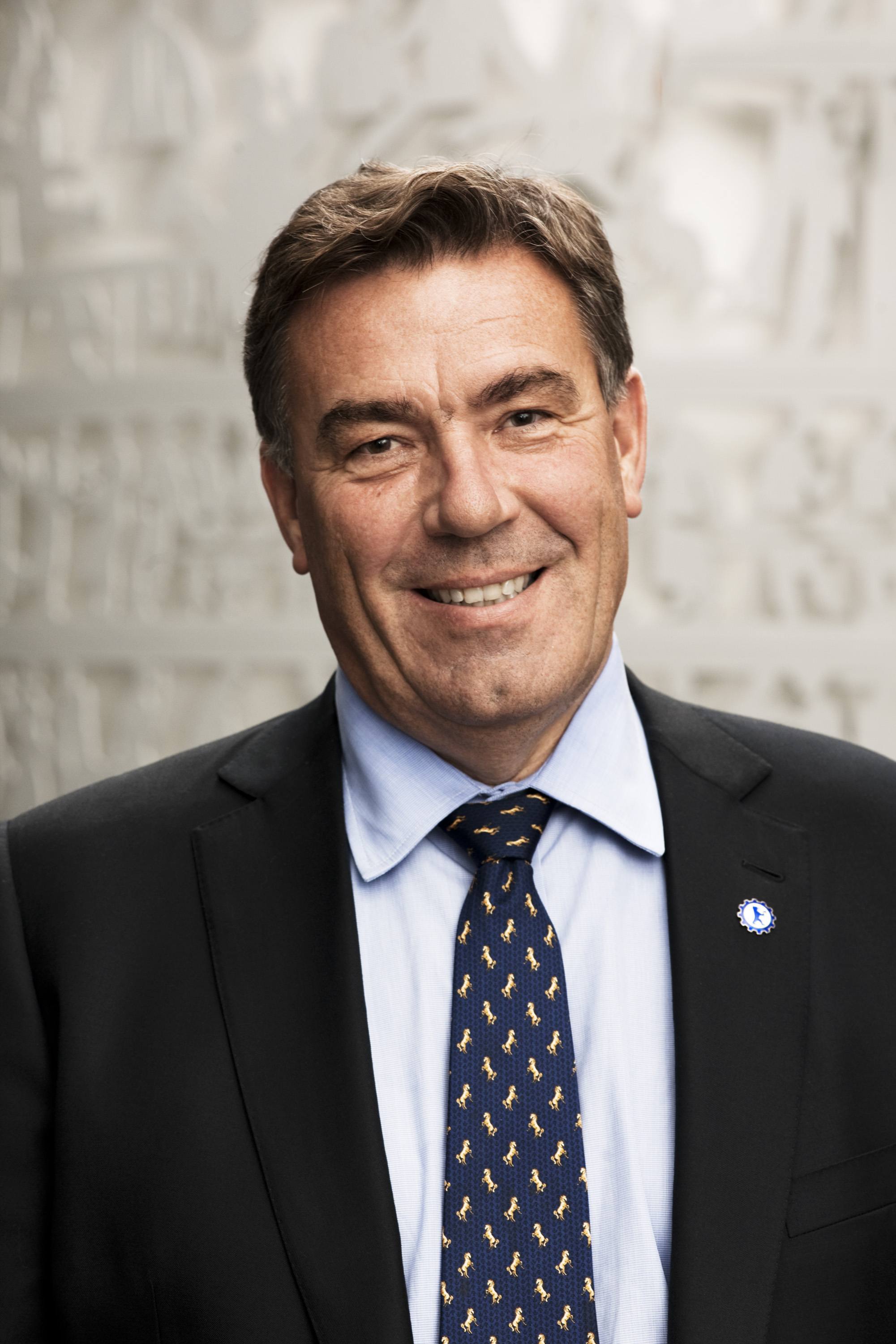
Stein Erik Hagen

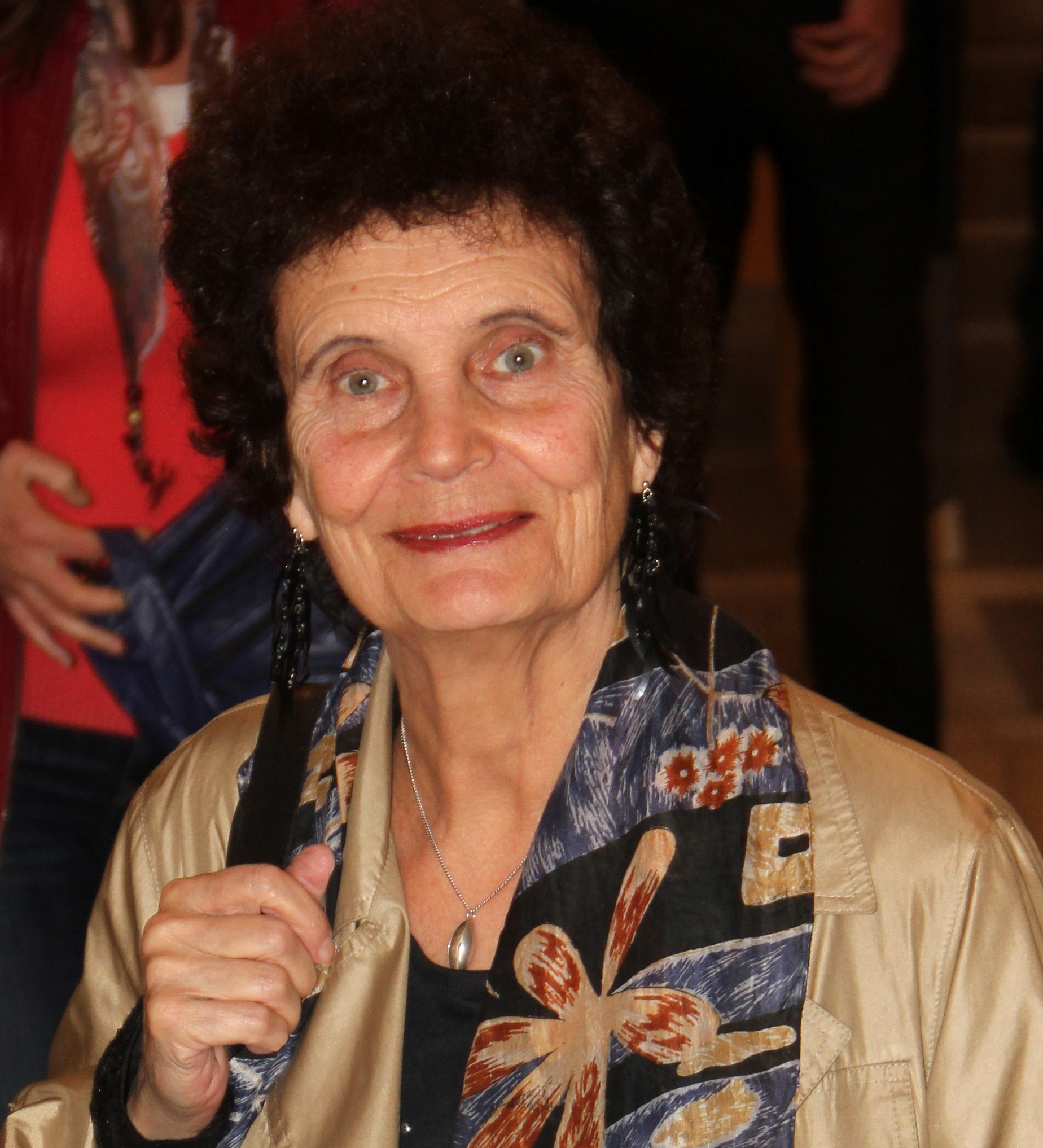
Anja Breien

- 2 May – Finn Wagle, bishop (born 1941).
- 4 May – Stein Erik Hagen, businessman (born 1956).
- 5 May – Terje Haugland, long jumper and high jumper (born 1944).
- 8 May – Tore Ryen, revue writer and screenwriter (born 1946).
- 9 May – Frid Ingulstad, writer (born 1935).
- 9 May – Åsfrid Svensen, literary historian (born 1936).
- 10 May – Anja Breien, film director (born 1940).
- 18 May – Tore Berger, sprint canoeist (born 1944).
- 23 May – Tom Lund, footballer (born 1950).
- 24 May – Edvard Moseid, zoo and amusement park director (born 1945).
- 28 May – Carsten Smith, judge (born 1932).
- 31 May – Sven Henning, stage director (born 1940).

=== June ===
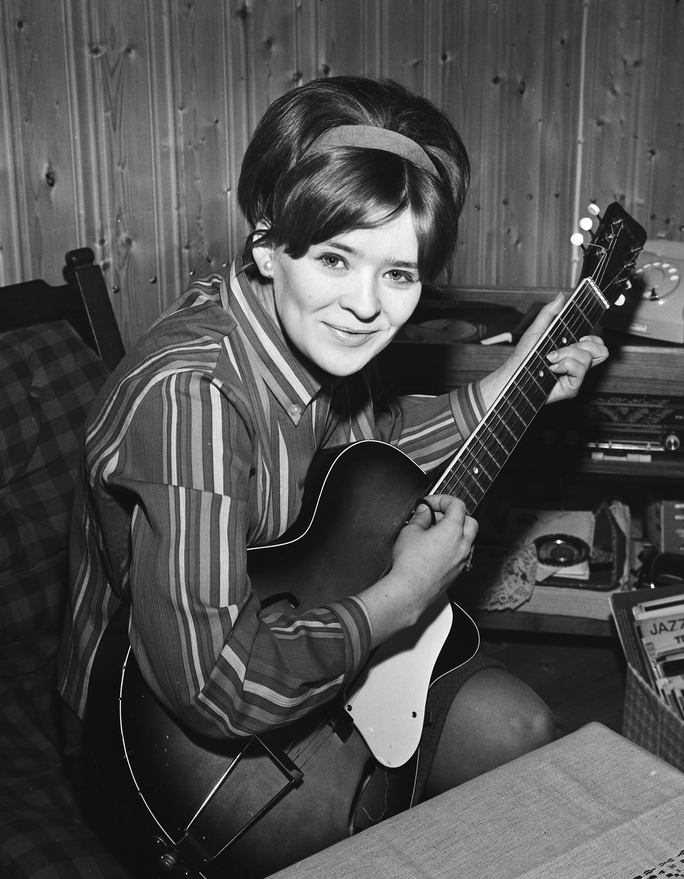
Kirsti Sparboe

- 1 June – Knut Husebø, actor (born 1944).
- 3 June – Max Kleven, 92, Norwegian-born American stuntman and director (born 1933).
- 5 June – Roar Arntzen, engineer and corporate executive (born 1947).
- 16 June – Per Ottesen, sports official (born 1932).
- 17 June – Andreas Høivold, professional poker player (born 1972).
- 18 June – Kirsti Sparboe, singer (born 1946).
- c.19 June – Trond Johansen, intelligence officer (born 1924).
- 22 June – Villy Haugen, speed skater (born 1944).
- 28 June – Knut Erling Granaas, sledge hockey goaltender (born 1967).
- 28 June – Egil Ulateig, journalist and non-fiction writer (born 1946).

=== July ===
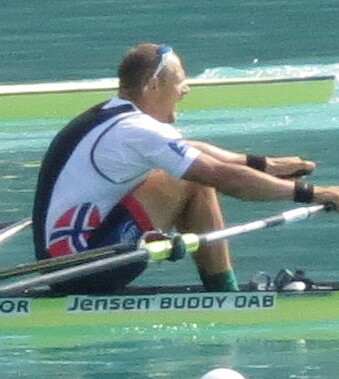
Olaf Tufte

- 3 July – Erling Diesen, engineer and civil servant (born 1932).
- 3 July – Torunn Isberg, artistic gymnast (born 1949).
- 8 July – Ole Tom Nord, ski jumper (born 1940).
- 10 July – Eva Røine, psychologist and writer (born 1928).
- 16 July – Johan Baumann, sports executive (born 1934).
- 21 July – Olaf Tufte, rower (born 1976).
- 22 July – Ingar Tore Narvhus, officer (born 1927).
- 27 July – Turid Iversen, politician (born 1934).

=== August ===
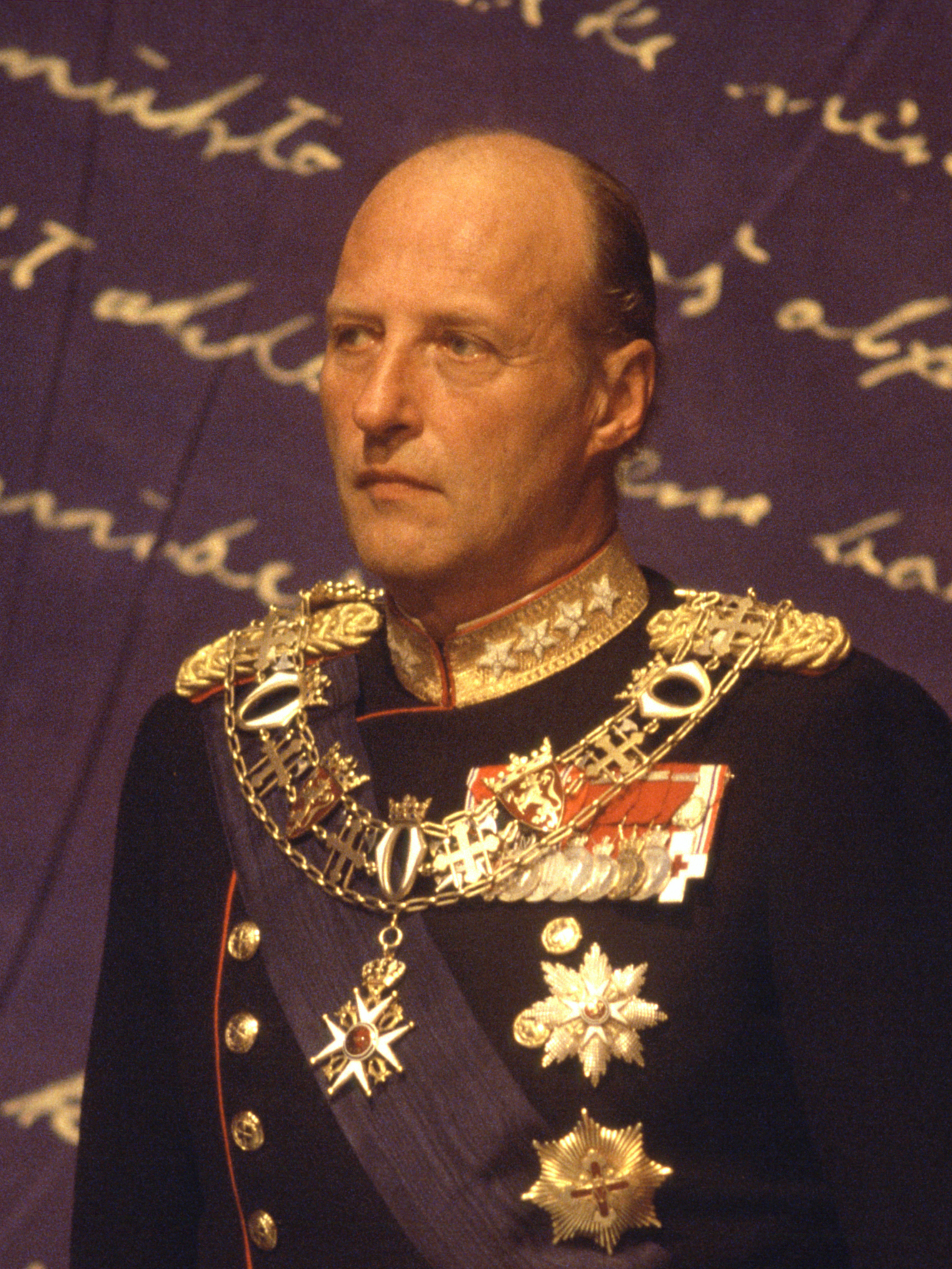
Harald V

- 4 August – Åshild Anmarkrud, politician (born 1939).
- 5 August – Bernt H. Lund, civil servant, politician and diplomat (born 1924).
- 9 August – Reidun Andreassen, politician (born 1936).
- 12 August – Kai Krüger, professor of law (born 1940).
- 21 August – Tom Lotherington, writer (born 1950).
- 23 August – Svein Mønnesland, linguist (born 1943).
- 25 August – Per Hilmar Nybø, footballer (born 1966).
- 28 August – Harald V, king (born 1937).

=== September ===
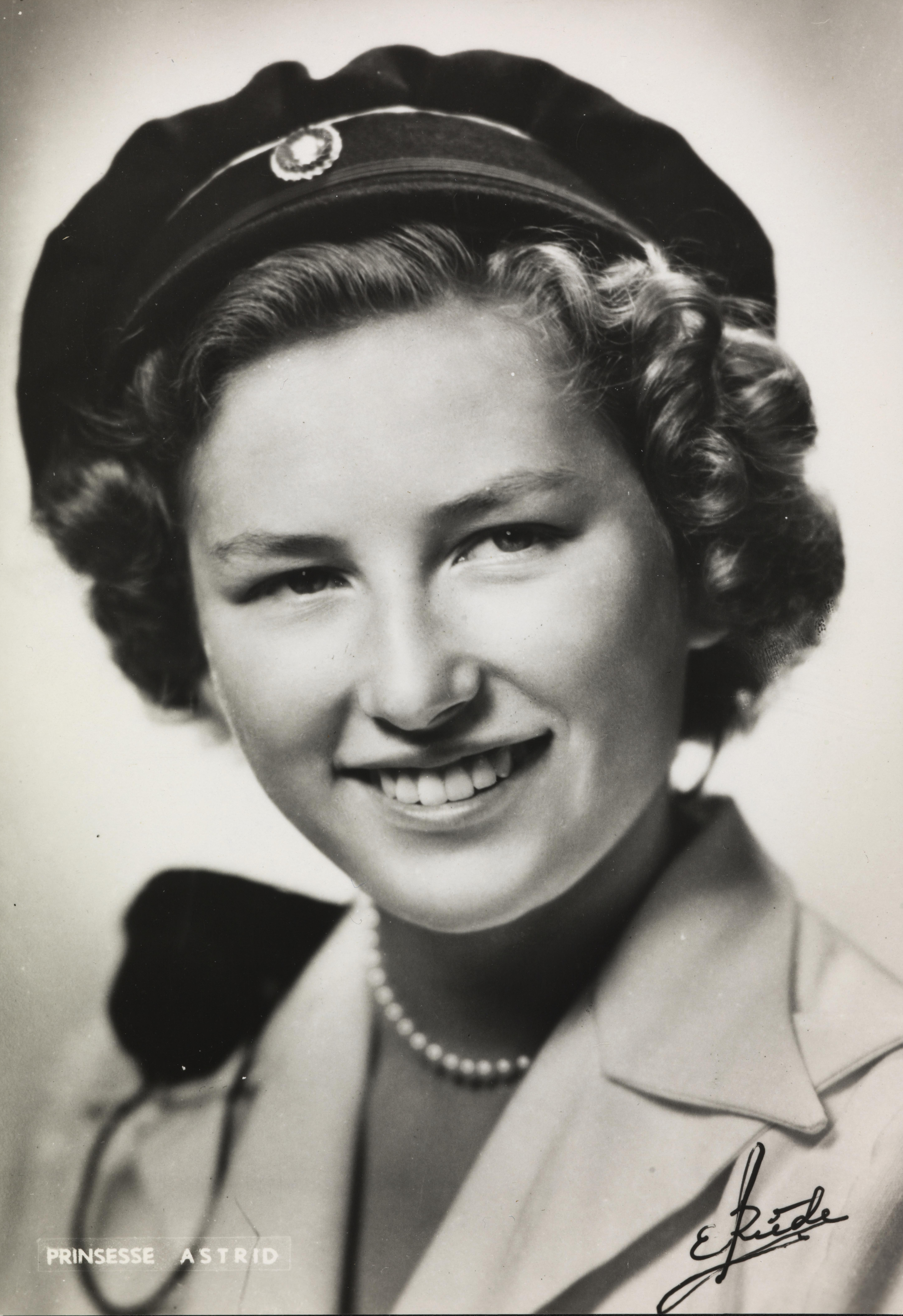
Princess Astrid

- 4 September – Lars Ivar Hansen, historian (born 1947).
- 5 September – Torstein Jøssang, physicist (born 1933).
- 11 September – Princess Astrid, Mrs. Ferner, royal (born 1932).
- 13 September – Bodolf Hareide, politician (born 1937).
- 13 September – Kari Wærness, sociologist (born 1939).
- 14 September – Bodil Cappelen, textile artist (born 1930).
- 25 September – Johan Buttedahl, politician (born 1935).
- c.29 September – Frank Grønlund, footballer (born 1952).

=== October ===
Eli Rygg

- 1 October – Oscar Reynert Olsen, artist (born 1925).
- 4 October – Amund Sjøbrend, speed-skater (born 1952).
- 7 October – Eirik Skadsdammen, ice hockey player (born 1981).
- 12 October – Rolf Nyhus, sports administrator (born 1942).
- 14 October – Asbjørn Eide, human rights scholar (born 1933).
- 15 October – Eli Rygg, television host (born 1955).
- 17 October – Per Haftorsen, footballer (born 1947).
- 18 October – Inger Nordal, botanist (born 1944).
- 18 October – Arne Ruste, writer (born 1942).
- 22 October – Tor Berntin Næss, diplomat (born 1942).
- 25 October – Sverre Horge, actor (born 1944).

=== November ===
- 11 November – Finn Coren, singer-songwriter (born 1961).
- 14 November – Ole Lund, barrister and industrial leader (born 1934).
- 20 November – Herman Kristoffersen, politician (born 1947).
