= Smedslund =

Smedslund is a surname. Notable people with the surname include:

- Jan Smedslund (born 1929), Norwegian psychologist
- Ragnar Smedslund (1900–1981), Finnish diplomat
