= Postmodernism =

Artistic, cultural, and theoretical movement

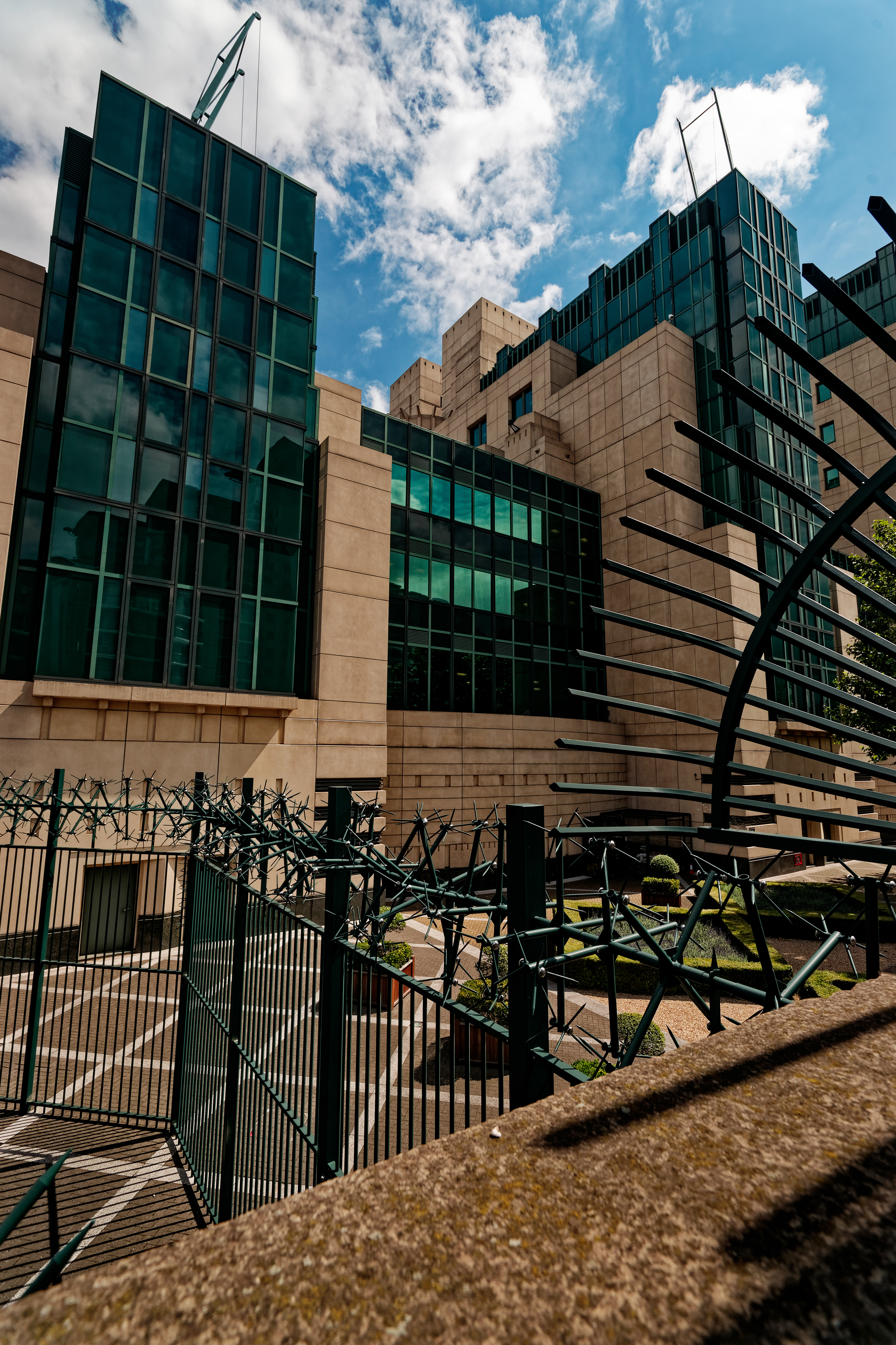
SIS Building (1994) by Terry Farrell: Detail view of the British intelligence service (MI6) headquarters in London, a "hulking, postmodern fortress" influenced by 1930s industrial modernist design and Mayan and Aztec temples.

Postmodernism encompasses a variety of artistic, cultural, and philosophical movements. It emerged in the mid-20th century as a skeptical response to modernism, emphasizing the instability of meaning, rejection of universal truths, and critique of grand narratives. While its definition varies across disciplines, it commonly involves skepticism toward established norms, blending of styles, and attention to the socially constructed nature of knowledge and reality.

The term began to acquire its current range of meanings in literary criticism and architectural theory during the 1950s–1960s. In opposition to modernism's alleged self-seriousness, postmodernism is characterized by its playful use of eclectic styles and performative irony, among other features, notably pluralism and skepticism. Critics claim it supplants moral, political, and aesthetic ideals with mere style and spectacle.

In the 1990s, "postmodernism" came to denote a generally celebratory response to cultural pluralism. Proponents align themselves with feminism, multiculturalism, and postcolonialism. Building upon poststructural theory, postmodern thought defined itself by the rejection of any single, foundational historical narrative. This called into question the legitimacy of the Enlightenment account of progress and rationality. Critics allege that its premises lead to a nihilistic form of relativism. In this sense, it has become a term of abuse in popular culture.

Historically, it arose alongside industrialization, globalization, and cultural upheaval, with early uses in art and literature evolving into philosophical and social theory through figures like Lyotard, Derrida, Foucault, Baudrillard, and Jameson. In practice, postmodernism manifests in arts, architecture, literature, music, dance, theater, fashion, marketing, and academic fields by embracing plurality, pastiche, reflexivity, and relativism. Although some argue postmodernism has waned, its influence persists in contemporary culture, now sometimes transitioning into so-called post-postmodern or reconstructive movements.

== Definitions ==
"Postmodernism" is "a highly contested term", referring to "a particularly unstable concept", that "names many different kinds of cultural objects and phenomena in many different ways". It may be described simply as a general mood or Zeitgeist. (Note: A sampling from other scholars: It is "diffuse, fragmentary, [and] multi-dimensional". Critics have described it as "an exasperating term" and claim that its indefinability is "a truism". Put otherwise, postmodernism is "several things at once". It has no single definition, and the term does not name any single unified phenomenon, but rather many diverse phenomena: "postmodernisms rather than one postmodernism".)

Although postmodernists are generally united in their effort to transcend the perceived limits of modernism, "modernism" also means different things to different critics in various arts. Further, there are outliers on even this basic stance; for instance, literary critic William Spanos conceives postmodernism not in period terms but in terms of a certain kind of literary imagination so that pre-modern texts such as Euripides' Orestes or Cervantes' Don Quixote count as postmodern.

According to scholar Louis Menand, "Postmodernism is the Swiss Army knife of critical concepts. It's definitionally overloaded, and it can do almost any job you need done." From an opposing perspective, media theorist Dick Hebdige criticized the vagueness of the term, enumerating a long list of otherwise unrelated concepts that people have designated as postmodernism, from "the décor of a room" or "a 'scratch' video", to fear of nuclear armageddon and the "implosion of meaning", and stated that anything that could signify all of those things was "a buzzword".

All this notwithstanding, scholar Hans Bertens offers the following:

If there is a common denominator to all these postmodernisms, it is that of a crisis in representation: a deeply felt loss of faith in our ability to represent the real, in the widest sense. No matter whether they are aesthestic [sic], epistemological, moral, or political in nature, the representations that we used to rely on can no longer be taken for granted.

In practical terms, postmodernisms share an attitude of skepticism towards grand explanations and established ways of doing things. In art, literature, and architecture, this attitude blurs boundaries between styles and genres, and encourages freely mixing elements, challenging traditional distinctions like high art versus popular art. In science, it emphasizes multiple ways of seeing things, and how people's cultural and personal backgrounds shape how they see the world, making it impossible to be completely objective. In philosophy, education, history, politics, and many other fields, it encourages critical re-examination of established institutions and social norms, embracing diversity, and breaking down disciplinary boundaries. Though these ideas weren't strictly new, postmodernism amplified them, using an often playful, at times deeply critical, attitude of pervasive skepticism to turn them into defining features.

== Historical overview ==
Two broad cultural movements, modernism and postmodernism, emerged in response to profound changes in the Western world. The Industrial Revolution, urbanization, secularization, technological advances, two world wars, and globalization deeply disrupted the social order. Modernism emerged in the late 1800s, seeking to redefine fundamental truths and values through a radical rethinking of traditional ideas and forms across many fields. Postmodernism emerged in the mid-20th century with a skeptical perspective that questioned the notion of universal truths and reshaped modernist approaches by embracing the complexity and contradictions of modern life.

The term "postmodernism" first appeared in print in 1870, but it only began to enter circulation with its current range of meanings in the 1950s—60s.

=== Early appearances ===
The term "postmodern" was first used in 1870 by the artist John Watkins Chapman, who described "a Postmodern style of painting" as a departure from French Impressionism. Similarly, the first citation given by the Oxford English Dictionary is dated to 1916, describing Gus Mager as "one of the few 'post' modern painters whose style is convincing".

Episcopal priest and cultural commentator J. M. Thompson, in a 1914 article, uses the term to describe changes in attitudes and beliefs in the critique of religion, writing, "the raison d'être of Post-Modernism is to escape from the double-mindedness of modernism by being thorough in its criticism by extending it to religion as well as theology, to Catholic feeling as well as to Catholic tradition". Cultural critic Randolph Bourne used the word to describe Japan in his essay "Trans-National America." In 1926, Bernard Iddings Bell, president of St. Stephen's College and also an Episcopal priest, published Postmodernism and Other Essays, which marks the first use of the term to describe a historical period following modernity. The essay criticizes lingering socio-cultural norms, attitudes, and practices of the Enlightenment. It is also critical of a purported cultural shift away from traditional Christian beliefs.

The term "postmodernity" was first used in an academic historical context as a general concept for a movement by Arnold J. Toynbee in a 1939 essay, which states that "Our own Post-Modern Age has been inaugurated by the general war of 1914–1918".

In 1942, the literary critic and author H. R. Hays described postmodernism as a new literary form. Also in the arts, the term was first used in 1949 to describe a dissatisfaction with the modernist architectural movement known as the International Style.

Although these early uses anticipate some of the concerns of the debate in the second part of the 20th century, there is little direct continuity in the discussion. Just when the new discussion begins, however, is also a matter of dispute. Various authors place its beginnings in the 1950s, 1960s, 1970s, and 1980s.

=== Theoretical development ===
In the mid-1970s, the American sociologist Daniel Bell provided a general account of the postmodern as an effectively nihilistic response to modernism's alleged assault on the Protestant work ethic and its rejection of what he upheld as traditional values. The ideals of modernity, per his diagnosis, were degraded to the level of consumer choice. This research project, however, was not taken up in a significant way by others until the mid-1980s when the work of Jean Baudrillard and Fredric Jameson, building upon art and literary criticism, reintroduced the term to sociology.

Discussion about the postmodern in the second part of the 20th century was most articulate in areas with a large body of critical discourse around the modernist movement. Even here, however, there continued to be disagreement about such basic issues as whether postmodernism is a break with modernism, a renewal and intensification of modernism, or even, both at once, a rejection and a radicalization of its historical predecessor.

While discussions in the 1970s were dominated by literary criticism, these were supplanted by architectural theory in the 1980s. Some of these conversations made use of French poststructuralist thought, but only after these innovations and critical discourse in the arts did postmodernism emerge as a philosophical term in its own right.

==== In literary and architectural theory ====
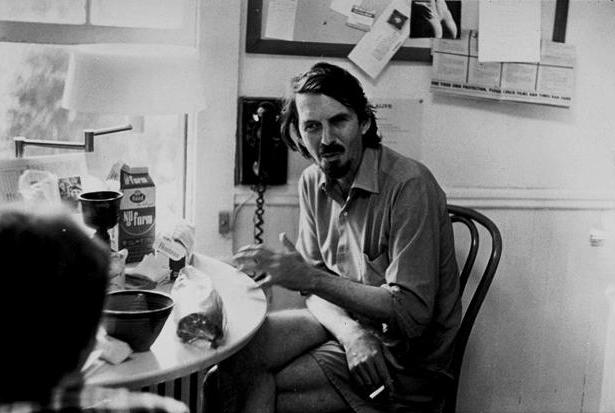
The poet Robert Creeley in 1972

According to Hans Bertens and Perry Anderson, the Black Mountain poets Charles Olson and Robert Creeley first introduced the term "postmodern" in its current sense during the 1950s. Their stance against modernist poetry – and Olson's Heideggerian orientation – was influential in the identification of postmodernism as a polemical position opposed to the rationalist values championed by the Enlightenment project.

During the 1960s, this affirmative use gave way to a pejorative use by the New Left, who used it to describe a waning commitment among youth to the political ideals of socialism and communism. The literary critic Irving Howe, for instance, denounced postmodern literature for being content to merely reflect, rather than actively attempt to refashion, what he saw as the "increasingly shapeless" character of contemporary society.

In the 1970s, this changed again, largely under the influence of the literary critic Ihab Hassan's large-scale survey of works that he said could no longer be called modern. Taking the Black Mountain poets as an exemplary instance of the new postmodern type, Hassan celebrates its Nietzschean playfulness and cheerfully anarchic spirit, which he sets off against the high seriousness of modernism. Yet, from another perspective, Friedrich Nietzsche's attack on Western philosophy and Martin Heidegger's critique of metaphysics posed deep theoretical problems not necessarily a cause for aesthetic celebration. Their further influence on the conversation about postmodernism, however, would be largely mediated by French poststructuralism.

If literature were at the center of the discussion in the 1970s, architecture was at the center in the 1980s. The architectural theorist Charles Jencks, in particular, connected the artistic avant-garde to social change in a way that captured attention outside of academia. Jencks, much influenced by the American architect Robert Venturi, celebrated a plurality of forms and encourages participation and active engagement with the local context of the built environment. He presented this as in opposition to the "authoritarian style" of International Modernism.

==== The influence of poststructuralism ====
In the 1970s, postmodern criticism increasingly came to incorporate poststructuralist theory, particularly the deconstructive approach to texts most strongly associated with Jacques Derrida, who attempted to demonstrate that the whole foundationalist approach to language and knowledge was untenable and misguided. It is during this period that postmodernism came to be particularly equated with a kind of anti-representational self-reflexivity. (Note: The incorporation of deconstruction into postmodernism, while common in the U.S., was resisted in the U.K. Furthermore, the more general category of poststructuralism itself was a largely American category, foreign to the disparate French thinkers upon whom it was imposed.)

In the 1980s, some critics began to take an interest in the work of Michel Foucault. This introduced a political concern about social power-relations into discussions about postmodernism. This was also the beginning of the affiliation of postmodernism with feminism and multiculturalism. The art critic Craig Owens, in particular, not only made the connection to feminism explicit, but went so far as to claim feminism for postmodernism wholesale, a broad claim resisted by even many sympathetic feminists such as Nancy Fraser and Linda Nicholson.

==== Generalization ====
Although postmodern criticism and thought drew on philosophical ideas from early on, "postmodernism" was only introduced to the expressly philosophical lexicon by Jean-François Lyotard in his 1979 (Note: English translation, 1984.) The Postmodern Condition: A Report on Knowledge. This work served as a catalyst for many of the subsequent intellectual debates around the term.

By the 1990s, postmodernism had become increasingly identified with critical and philosophical discourse directly about postmodernity or the postmodern idiom itself. No longer centered on any particular art or even the arts in general, it instead turned to address the more general problems posed to society in general by a new proliferation of cultures and forms. It is during this period that it also came to be associated with postcolonialism and identity politics.

Around this time, postmodernism also began to be conceived in popular culture as a general "philosophical disposition" associated with a loose sort of relativism. In this sense, the term also started to appear as a "casual term of abuse" in non-academic contexts. Others identified it as an aesthetic "lifestyle" of eclecticism and playful self-irony.

=== The "Science Wars" ===
The basis for what became known later as the Science Wars was the 1962 publication of The Structure of Scientific Revolutions by the physicist and historian of science Thomas Kuhn. Kuhn presented the direction of scientific inquiry — the kind of questions that can be asked, and what counts as a correct answer — as governed by a "paradigm" defining what counts as "normal science" during any given period. While not based on postmodern ideas or continental philosophy, Kuhn's intervention set the agenda for much of The Postmodern Condition and has subsequently been presented as the beginning of "postmodern epistemology" in the philosophy of science.

In Kuhn's 1962 framework, the assumptions introduced by new paradigms make them "mutually incommensurable" with previous ones, although they may provide improved explanations of the material world. (Note: By this Kuhn did not mean that scientific revolutions did not progressively reveal truths about objective reality, only that their lack of a shared vocabulary makes one-to-one comparison impossible, and so requires conceptual translation from one paradigm to another. In spite of Kuhn's own interpretation, The Structure of Scientific Revolutions was widely interpreted by its readers as undermining the basic objectivity and rationality of scientific knowledge itself.) A more radical version of incommensurability, introduced by the philosopher of science Paul Feyerabend, made stronger claims that connected the largely Anglo-American debate about science to the development of poststructuralism in France.

To some, the stakes were more than epistemological. (Note: Or financial: In the counter-culture in the 1960s, U.S. military spending on science – which, post-WWII, had been unquestioned – was again made an object of controversy.) The philosopher Israel Scheffler, for instance, argued that the ever-expanding body of scientific knowledge embodies a sort of "moral principle" protecting society from its authoritarian and tribal tendencies. In this way, with the addition of the poststructuralist influence, the debate about science expanded into a debate about Western culture in general.

The French political philosophers Alain Renaut and Luc Ferry began a series of responses to this interpretation of postmodernism, and these inspired the physicist Alan Sokal to submit a deliberately nonsensical paper to a postmodernist journal, where it was accepted and published in 1996. Although the so-called Sokal hoax proved nothing about postmodernism or science, it added to the public perception of a high-stakes intellectual "war" that had already been introduced to the general public by popular books published in the late '80s and '90s. (Note: Their subtitles speak for themselves: philosopher Allan Bloom's 1987 The Closing of the American Mind: How Higher Education Has Failed Democracy and Impoverished the Souls of Today's Students and biologist Paul Gross and mathematician Norman Levitt's 1994 Higher Superstition: The Academic Left and Its Quarrels with Science.) By the late '90s, however, the debate had largely subsided, in part due to the recognition that it had been staged between strawman versions of postmodernism and science alike.

== In the arts ==
Andy Warhol's Campbell's Soup I (1968)

Postmodernism encompasses a wide range of artistic movements and styles. In visual arts, pop art, conceptual art, feminist art, video art, minimalism, and neo-expressionism are among the approaches recognized as postmodern. The label extends to diverse musical genres and artists: John Cage, Madonna, and punk rock all meet postmodern definitions. Literature, film, architecture, theater, fashion, dance, and many other creative disciplines saw postmodern expression. As an example, Andy Warhol's pop art across multiple mediums challenged traditional distinctions between high and low culture, and blurred the lines between fine art and commercial design. His work, exemplified by the iconic Campbell's Soup Cans series during the 1960s, brought the postmodernist sensibility to mainstream attention.

Criticism of postmodernist movements in the arts include objections to departure from beauty, the reliance on language for the art to have meaning, a lack of coherence or comprehensibility, deviation from clear structure, and consistent use of dark and negative themes.

=== Architecture ===
Children's Museum of Houston, Texas LCCN2011635279

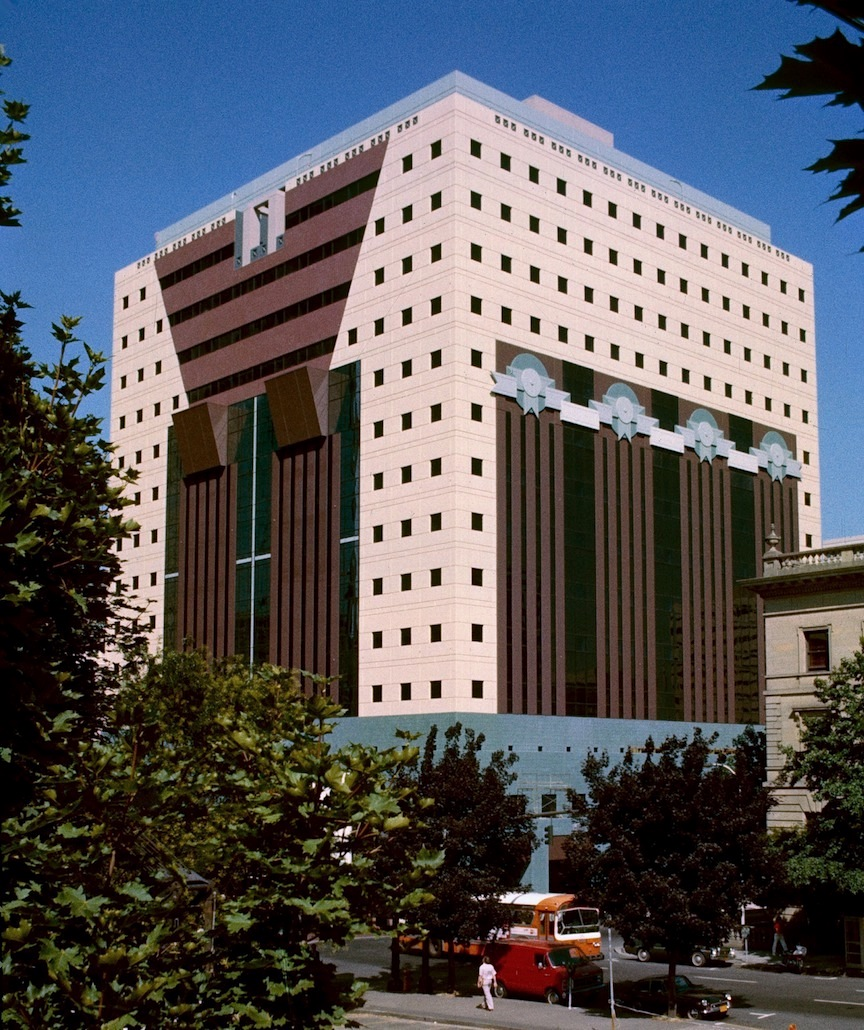
Portland Building (1982) by Michael Graves, considered the first built example of postmodern architecture in a tall building and "a seminal Postmodern work"

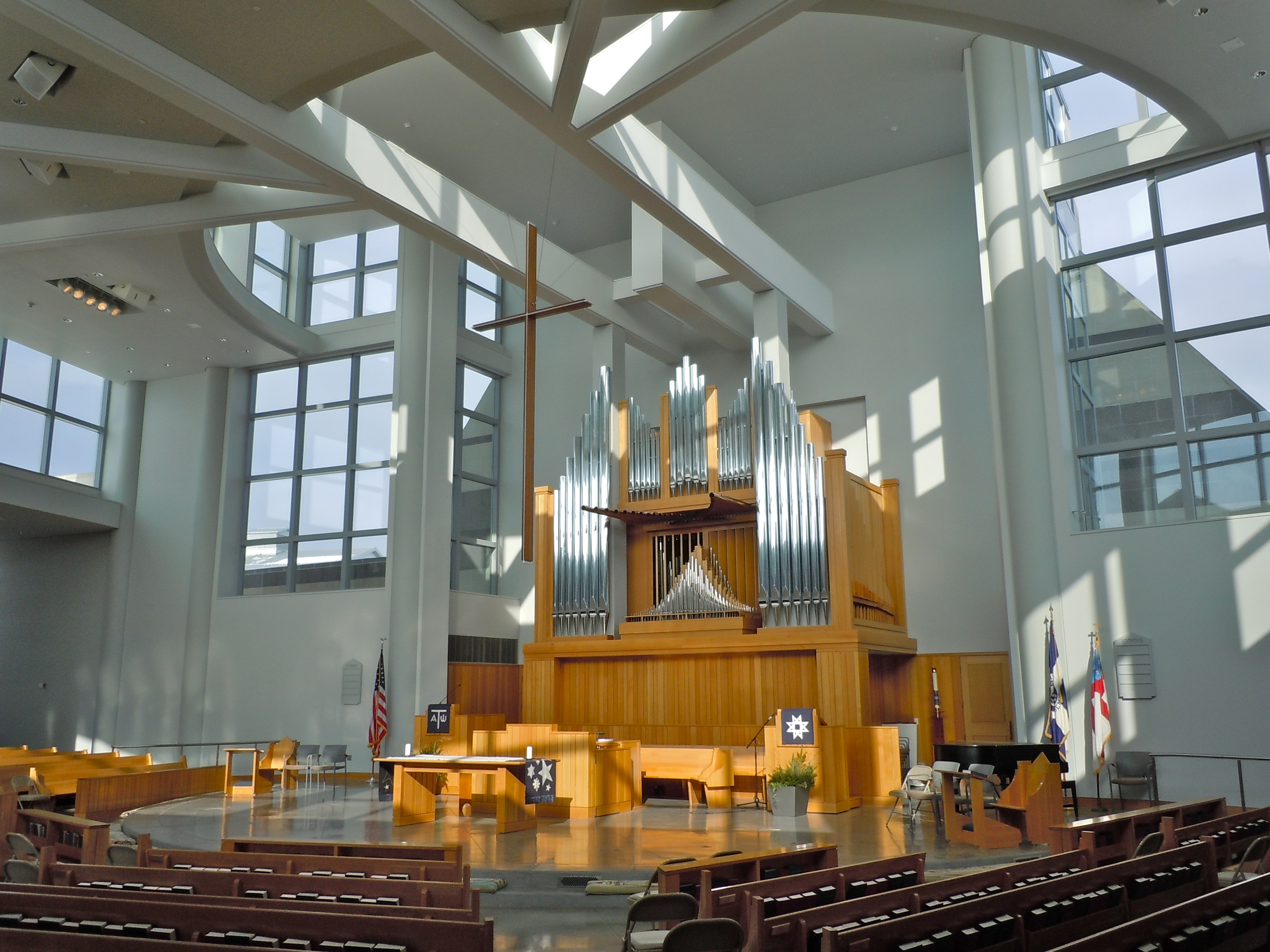
Interior of the Chapel at the Episcopal Academy near Newtown Square, PA by alumnus of the Academy architect Robert Venturi

Scholarship regarding postmodernism and architecture is closely linked with the writings of critic-turned-architect Charles Jencks, beginning with lectures in the early 1970s and his essay "The Rise of Post-Modern Architecture" from 1975. His magnum opus, however, is the book The Language of Post-Modern Architecture, first published in 1977, and since running to seven editions (in which he famously wrote: "Modern architecture died in St. Louis, Missouri, on 15 July 1972 at 3:32 p.m. (or thereabouts) when the infamous Pruitt–Igoe scheme, or rather several of its slab blocks, were given the final coup de grâce by dynamite.").

Jencks makes the point that postmodernism (like modernism) varies for each field of art, and that for architecture it is not just a reaction to modernism but what he terms double coding: "Double Coding: the combination of Modern techniques with something else (usually traditional building) in order for architecture to communicate with the public and a concerned minority, usually other architects."

In their book, "Revisiting Postmodernism", Terry Farrell and Adam Furman argue that postmodernism brought a more joyous and sensual experience to the culture, particularly in architecture. For instance, in response to the modernist slogan of Ludwig Mies van der Rohe that "less is more", the postmodernist Robert Venturi rejoined that "less is a bore".

=== Dance ===
The term "postmodern dance" is most strongly associated with the Judson Dance Theater, located in New York's Greenwich Village during the 1960s and 1970s. Perhaps its most important principle is taken from the composer John Cage's efforts to break down the distinction between art and life, developed in particular by the American dancer and choreographer Merce Cunningham, Cage's partner. The Judson dancers "[stripped] dance of its theatrical conventions such as virtuoso technique, fanciful costumes, complex storylines, and the traditional stage [and] drew on everyday movements (sitting, walking, kneeling, and other gestures) to create their pieces, often performing them in ordinary spaces." Anna Halprin's San Francisco Dancers' Workshop, established in the 1950s to explore beyond the technical constraints of modern dance, pioneered ideas later developed at Judson; Halprin, Simone Forti, and Yvonne Rainer are considered "giants of the field".

The Judson collective included trained dancers, visual artists, filmmakers, writers, and composers, exchanging approaches, and critiquing traditional dance, with a focus "more on the intellectual process of creating dance than the end result". The end of the 1970s saw a distancing from this analytical postmodern dance, and a return to the expression of meaning. In the 1980s and 1990s, dance began to incorporate other typically postmodern features such as the mixing of genres, challenging high–low cultural distinctions, and incorporating a political dimension.

=== Film ===
Postmodern film aims to subvert the mainstream conventions of narrative structure and characterization, and to test the audience's suspension of disbelief. Typically, such films also break down the cultural divide between high and low art and often upend typical portrayals of gender, race, class, genre, and time with the goal of creating something that does not abide by traditional narrative expression.

Certain key characteristics are used to separate the postmodern from modernist cinema and traditional narrative film. One is an extensive use of homage or pastiche, imitating the style or character of other artistic works. A second is meta-reference or self-reference, highlighting the relation of the image to other images in media and not to any kind of external reality. Viewers are reminded that the film itself is only a film, perhaps through the use of intertextuality, in which the film's characters reference other works of fiction. A third characteristic is stories that unfold out of chronological order, deconstructing or fragmenting time to emphasize the constructed nature of film. Another common element is a bridging of the gap between highbrow and lowbrow. Contradictions of all sorts are crucial to postmodernism.

Ridley Scott's Blade Runner (1982) has been widely studied as a prime example of postmodernism. The setting is a future dystopia where "replicants", enhanced android workers nearly indistinguishable from humans, are hunted down when they escape from their jobs. The film blurs boundaries between genres and cultures, and fuses disparate styles and periods: futuristic visuals "mingle with drab 1940s clothes and offices, punk rock hairstyles, pop Egyptian styles and oriental culture." The blending of film noir and science-fiction into tech noir illustrates the deconstruction of both cinema and genre. The film can also be seen as an example of major studios using the "mystique and cachet of the term 'postmodern' as a sales pitch", resulting in Hollywood movies that "demonstrate all the postmodern characteristics". From another perspective, "critical responses to Blade Runner fall on either side of a modern/postmodern line" – critical analysis from "modernist" and "postmodernist" approaches produce entirely different interpretations.

=== Literature ===
In 1971, the American literary theorist Ihab Hassan made "postmodernism" popular in literary studies with his influential book, The Dismemberment of Orpheus: Toward a Postmodern Literature. According to scholar David Herwitz, American writers such as John Barth (who had controversially declared that the novel was "exhausted" as a genre), Donald Barthelme, and Thomas Pynchon responded in various ways to the stylistic innovations of Finnegans Wake and the late work of Samuel Beckett. Postmodern literature often calls attention to issues regarding its own complicated connection to reality. The postmodern novel plays with language, twisted plots, multiple narrators, and unresolved endings, unsettling the conventional idea of the novel as faithfully reflecting the world.

In Postmodernist Fiction (1987), Brian McHale details the shift from modernism to postmodernism, arguing that postmodernist works developed out of modernism, moving from concern with questions about the nature and limits of knowledge about one's "world" ("epistemological dominant") to concern with questions of modes of being and existence in relation to "different kinds of worlds" ("ontological dominant"). McHale's "What Was Postmodernism?" (2007) follows Raymond Federman's lead in now using the past tense when discussing postmodernism. Others argue that postmodernism in literature utilizes compositional and semantic practices such as inclusivity, intentional indiscrimination, nonselection, and "logical impossibility."

=== Music ===
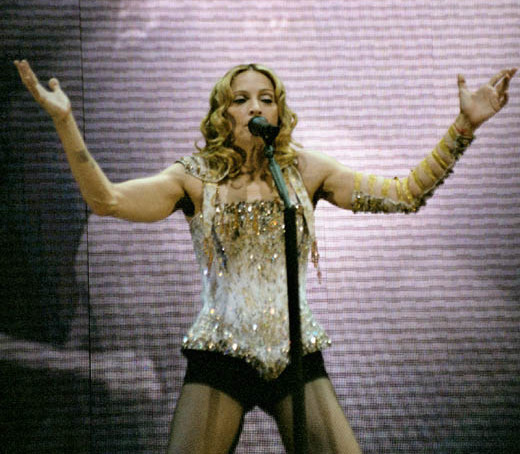
American singer-songwriter Madonna

Postmodern influence extends across all areas of music; its accessibility to a general audience requires an understanding of references, irony, and pastiche that varies widely between artists and their works. In popular music, Madonna, David Bowie, and Talking Heads have been singled out by critics and scholars as postmodern icons. The belief that art music – serious, classical music – holds higher cultural and technical value than folk and popular traditions, lost influence under postmodern analysis, as musical hybrids and crossovers attracted scholarly attention.

Across musical traditions, postmodernism can be identified through several core characteristics: genre mixing; irony, humor, and self-parody; "surface" exploration with less concern for formal structure than in modernist approaches; and a return to tonality. This represents a loss of authority of the Eurocentric perspective on music and the rise of world music as influenced by postmodern values. Composers took different routes: some returned to traditional modes over experimentation, others challenged the authority of dominant musical structures, others intermingled disparate sources.

The composer Jonathan Kramer has written that avant-garde musical compositions (which some would consider modernist rather than postmodernist) "defy more than seduce the listener, and they extend by potentially unsettling means the very idea of what music is." In the 1960s, composers such as Henryk Górecki and Philip Glass reacted to the perceived elitism and dissonant sound of atonal academic modernism by producing music with simple textures and relatively consonant harmonies, whilst others, most notably John Cage challenged the modernist account of structure by including the contingent in the structure of his compositions themselves.

In 2023, music critic Andy Cush described Talking Heads as "New York art-punks" whose "blend of nervy postmodernism and undeniable groove made them one of the defining rock bands of the late 1970s and '80s." Media theorist Dick Hebdige, examining the "Road to Nowhere" music video in 1989, said the group "draw eclectically on a wide range of visual and aural sources to create a distinctive pastiche or hybrid 'house style' which they have used since their formation in the mid-1970s deliberately to stretch received (industrial) definitions of what rock/pop/video/Art/performance/audience are", calling them "a properly postmodernist band." According to lead vocalist/guitarist/songwriter David Byrne, commenting in 2011, "Anything could be mixed and matched – or mashed up, as is said today – and anything was fair game for inspiration."

Avant-garde academics labelled American singer Madonna a "personification of the postmodern" and created a sub-discipline of cultural studies known as Madonna studies. Her self-aware constructs of gender and identity, and classic film references in music videos for "Material Girl" (1984) and "Express Yourself" (1989), made her a favorite of cultural theorists, who saw her as "enacting postmodernist models of subjectivity." Madonna was seen to embody fragmentation, pastiche, retrospection, anti-foundationalism, and de-differentiation; her "subversion of the subversion of the subversion of the male gaze" in the "Material Girl" video was analyzed.

=== Performance and theater ===
Postmodern theater emerged as a reaction against modernist theater. Most postmodern productions are centered on highlighting the fallibility of definite truth, instead encouraging the audience to reach their own individual understanding. Essentially, thus, postmodern theater raises questions rather than attempting to supply answers.

=== Sculpture ===
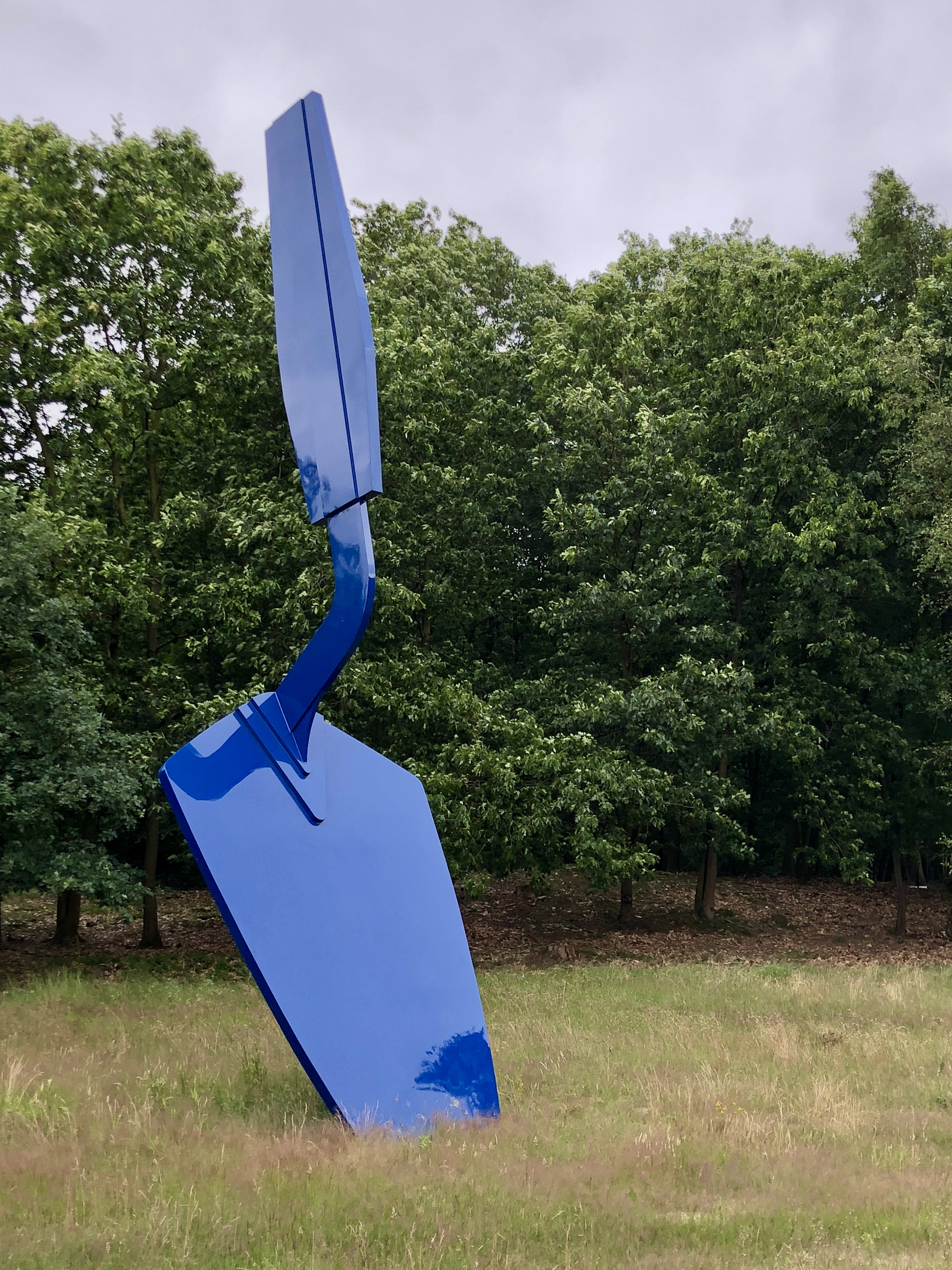
"Trowel" (1976) by Claes Oldenburg

Sculptor Claes Oldenberg, at the forefront of the pop art movement, declared in 1961: "I am for an art that is political-erotical-mystical … I am for an art that embroils itself with everyday crap and still comes out on top." That year, he opened The Store in a dime store area of New York's Lower East Side, where he blurred the line between art and commerce by producing and selling brightly painted plaster replicas of hamburgers and cans of soda, dresses, underwear, and other everyday objects: "Museum in b[ourgeois] concept equals store in mine".

== In philosophy ==
=== Poststructuralist precursors ===
In the 1970s, a disparate group of French theorists – often grouped together as "poststructuralists" – developed a critique of modern philosophy with roots discernible in Friedrich Nietzsche and Martin Heidegger's critique of metaphysics. Although few themselves relied upon the term, they became known to many as postmodern theorists. Poststructuralism is sometimes treated as distinct from or a subcategory of postmodernism and sometimes is treated as having been subsumed by postmodernism. (Note: For instance, contrast Poster 1989, p. 4 with Sim 2011b, pp. ix–x.) While their ideas exerted a great influence on debates about the postmodern, the French poststructuralists themselves did not intervene or attempt to provide their own definitions of the postmodern.

Poststructuralists, like structuralists, start from the assumption that people's identities, values, and economic conditions determine each other as parts of a common whole, rather than having intrinsic properties that can be understood in isolation. While structuralism explores how meaning is produced by a set of essential relationships in an overarching quasi-linguistic system, poststructuralism accepts this premise, but rejects the assumption that such systems can ever be fixed or centered. Instead, poststructuralists stress the various ways that cultural structures are produced in history. They also emphasize how meaning is generated, rather than discovered, and they replace the traditional concept of "representation" (according to which meaning is determined by the objected signified) to focus instead upon the elastic potentialities of language to generate new meanings. (Note: Poster 1989, (p. 4) offers as linguistic examples écriture (Derrida), discourse/practice (Foucault), code (Baudrillard), and phrases and le différend (Lyotard). On signification more generally, Best & Kellner 1991, (p. 21) present dissemination (Derrida), desire (Deleuze and Guattari), intensities (Lyotard), semiurgy (Baudrillard), and power (Foucault).)

Politically, all of them began with Marxist sympathies, became disillusioned, and eventually opposed the French Communist Party and its application of theory. The chaos following the briefly successful communist revolution of May '68 in France was a particular point of rupture.

==== Jacques Derrida and deconstruction ====
Deconstruction is a practice in philosophy, literary criticism, and close reading developed by Jacques Derrida. It is based on the assumption, which it seeks to validate by textual analysis, that any text harbors inherent points of "undecidability" that undermine any stable meaning intended by the author. The process of writing inevitably, he aims to show, reveals suppressed elements, challenging the oppositions that are thought to sustain the text. Nevertheless, Derrida does not wish to do away with such concepts as "origin" or "truth". What he challenges is any claim to finality. Such metaphysical concepts are, as he puts it, "under erasure", and this, he says, makes deconstructive reading a kind of "double play".

From this perspective, Derrida argues that the practice of metaphysics in the Western tradition depends upon hierarchies and orders of subordination within various dualisms that it does not acknowledge. It prioritizes presence and purity over the contingent and complicated, dismissing them as aberrations irrelevant to philosophical analysis. In essence, according to Derrida, metaphysical thought prioritizes one side of an opposition while ignoring or marginalizing the alternative. He uses the term metaphysics of presence to describe the foundationalist approach to knowledge, taking himself to have demonstrated that people do not have unmediated access to reality. This project of deconstructing and challenging the assumptions of modern philosophy was influential for many postmodern thinkers.

==== Michel Foucault on power relations ====
French philosopher and social theorist Michel Foucault argued that power operates according to the logics of social institutions that have become unmoored from the intentions of any actual individuals. Individuals, according to Foucault, are both products and participants in these dynamics. Among other strategies, he employed a Nietzsche-inspired "genealogical method" to analyze power-relations across their historical permutations.

Both Foucault's political orientation and the consistency of his positions continue to be debated among critics and defenders alike. Nevertheless, Foucault's political works share two common elements: a historical perspective and a discursive methodology. He analyzed social phenomena in historical contexts and focused on how they have evolved over time. Additionally, he employed the study of written texts, usually academic texts, as the material for his inquiries. In this way, Foucault sought to understand how the historical formation of discourses has shaped contemporary political thinking and institutions.

==== Jean Baudrillard on hyperreality ====
Although trained in sociology, Jean Baudrillard worked across many disciplines. Drawing upon some of the technical vocabulary of the psychoanalyst Jacques Lacan, Baudrillard argued that social production had shifted from creating real objects to instead producing signs and symbols. This system of symbolic exchange, detached from the real, constitutes hyperreality. In the words of one commentator, "the hyperreal is a system of simulation that simulates itself."

Postmodernity, Baudrillard said, is the condition in which the domain of reality has become so heavily mediated by signs as to become inaccessible in itself, leaving us entirely in the domain of the simulacra, images that bear no relation to anything outside of themselves. This hyperreality is presented as the terminal stage of simulation, where signs and images become entirely self-referential.

Baudrillard's vision of postmodernity has been described as "apocalyptic", and scholars disagree about whether his later works are intended as science fiction or truthful theoretical claims. Another interpretation is that Baudrillard deliberately adopts the role of agent provocateur.

=== A crisis of legitimacy ===
At the center of the intellectual debate about postmodernism is the question of what, if anything, grounds theory. What establishes that a statement is true or that an action is right? This foundational debate is most prominently on display in Habermas's rejoinder to Lyotard's anti-foundational, postmodern challenge to Habermas's own foundational version of modernism.

==== The Postmodern Condition ====
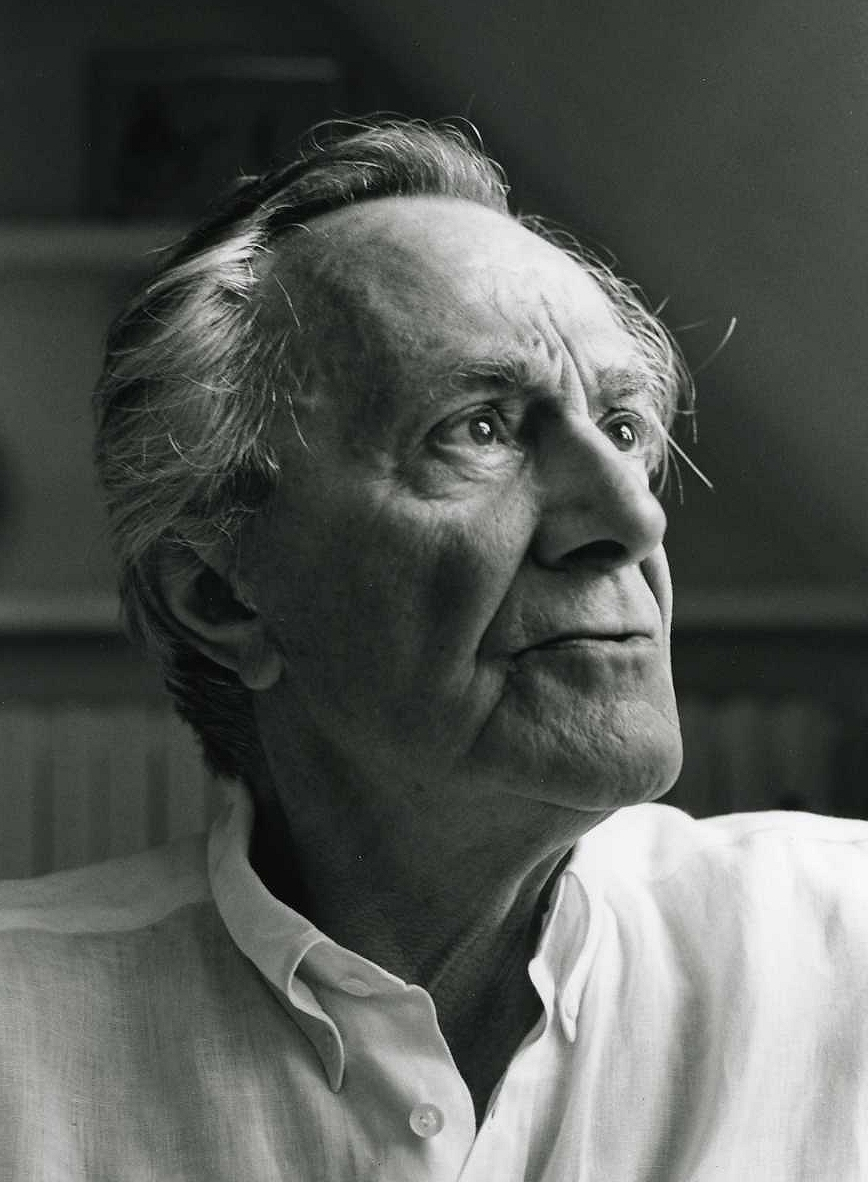
Philosopher Jean-François Lyotard, photo by Bracha L. Ettinger, 1995

Jean-François Lyotard is credited with being the first to use the term "postmodern" in a philosophical context. This appeared in his 1979 The Postmodern Condition: A Report on Knowledge. In this influential work, Lyotard provided the following definition: "Simplifying to the extreme, I define postmodern as incredulity towards metanarratives". (Note: Le métarécit, sometimes also grand récit, "grand narrative")

By "metanarratives", Lyotard meant such overarching narrative frameworks as those provided by Christianity, G. W. F. Hegel, and Karl Marx that unite and determine people's basic sense of place and significance in the world. It was his early disillusionment with his early Marxism that would later be generalized into the universal claim about metanarratives. In a society with no unifying narrative, he argued, people are left with heterogeneous, group-specific narratives (or "language games", as adopted from Ludwig Wittgenstein) with no universal perspective from which to adjudicate among them.

According to Lyotard, this introduced a general crisis of legitimacy, a theme he adopts from the philosopher Jürgen Habermas, whose theory of communicative rationality Lyotard rejected. While he was particularly concerned in that report with the way that this insight undermined claims of scientific objectivity, Lyotard's argument undermines the entire principle of transcendent legitimization. Instead, proponents of a language game must make the case for their legitimacy with reference to such considerations as efficiency or practicality. Far from celebrating the apparently relativistic consequences of this argument, however, Lyotard focused much of his subsequent work on how links among games could be established, particularly with respect to ethics and politics.

==== The philosophical criticism of Jürgen Habermas ====
The philosopher Jürgen Habermas, a prominent critic of philosophical postmodernism, argued in his 1985 work The Philosophical Discourse of Modernity (Note: This volume is an extension of his 1980 speech "Modernity—An Unfinished Project", published the next year as "Modernity versus Postmodernity". Even though Lyotard is not treated directly, Habermas describes the work as an explicit response to Lyotard's challenges to the theory of communicative rationality.) that postmodern thinkers were caught in a performative contradiction, more specifically, that their critiques of modernity rely on concepts and methods that are themselves products of modern reason.

Habermas criticized these thinkers for their rejection of the subject and their embrace of experimental, avant-garde strategies. He asserted that their critiques of modernism ultimately lead to a longing for the very subject they seek to dismantle. Habermas also took issue with postmodernists' leveling of the distinction between philosophy and literature. He argued that such rhetorical strategies undermine the importance of argument and communicative reason.

Habermas's critique of postmodernism set the stage for much of the subsequent debate by clarifying some of its key underlying issues. According to scholar Gary Aylesworth – against those who would dismiss postmodernist discourse as simple nonsense – the fact that Habermas was "able to read postmodernist texts closely and discursively testifies to their intelligibility". His engagement with their ideas has led some postmodern philosophers, following Lyotard, to similarly engage with Habermas's criticisms.

=== Frederic Jameson's Marxist rejoinder ===
The appearance of linguistic relativism also inspired an extensive rebuttal by the Marxist critic Fredric Jameson. Building upon the theoretical foundations laid out by the Marxist economist Ernst Mandel and observations in the early work of the sociologist Jean Baudrillard, Jameson developed his own conception of the postmodern as "the cultural logic of late capitalism" in the form of an enormous cultural expansion into an economy of spectacle and style, rather than the production of goods. According to Jameson, because the postmodern is result of political and historical circumstances that make up the social world, it is not something that can be simply embraced or condemned. Instead, it must be analyzed and understood so that we may confront the world as it is.

Jameson categorizes a variety of features of the postmodern. One is the elision of the distinction between high culture and mass culture. Also, because of the loss of a unified "bourgeois ego", subjectivity is less focused, and people experience what he terms a "waning of the affect", an emotional disengagement from the social world. This loss of significance leads to what he calls "depthlessness", a difficulty in getting beneath the surfaces of cultural objects to find any deeper significance than is offered directly to the subject. Reduced to a set of styles, history looses its political force. This phenomenon finds expression, for instance, in the shift from "parody", in which styles are mixed in the interest of making a point, to "pastiche", in which styles are mixed together without attention to their original contexts.

=== Richard Rorty's neopragmatism ===
Richard Rorty was an American philosopher known for his linguistic form of neopragmatism. Initially attracted to analytic philosophy, Rorty later rejected its representationalism. His major influences, rather than the poststructuralists, include Charles Darwin, Hans Georg Gadamer, G. W. F. Hegel, and Martin Heidegger.

Rorty challenged the notion of a mind-independent, language-independent reality. He argued that language is a tool used to adapt to the environment and achieve desired ends. This naturalistic approach led him to abandon the traditional quest for a privileged mental power that allows direct access to things-in-themselves.

Instead, Rorty advocated for a focus on imaginative alternatives to present beliefs rather than the pursuit of independently grounded truths. He believed that creative, secular humanism, free from authoritarian assertions about truth and goodness, is the key to a better future. Rorty saw his neopragmatism as a continuation of the Enlightenment project, aiming to demystify human life and replace traditional power relations with those based on tolerance and freedom.

== In other fields ==
Postmodernism is more fully understood by observing its effects in such diverse fields as law, education, urban planning, religious studies, politics and many others. Its influence varies widely across disciplines, reflecting the extent to which postmodern theories and ideas have been integrated into actual practices.

=== Anthropology ===
Reflexivity is central to postmodern anthropology, a continuous practice of critical self-awareness that attempts to address the subjectivity inherent in interpretation. Other key practices are an emphasis on including the perspectives of the people being studied; cultural relativism, which considers values and beliefs within their cultural context; skepticism towards the notion that science can produce objective and universally valid knowledge; and rejection of grand narratives or theories that attempt to explain other cultures.

The issue of subjectivity is a concern: as ethnographies are influenced by the perspective of the author, the question arises in the study of individual cultures as to whether the author's opinions should be considered scientific. Clifford Geertz, considered a founding member of postmodernist anthropology, holds that, "anthropological writings are themselves interpretations, and second and third order ones to boot. (By definition, only a 'native' makes first order ones: it's his culture.)"

=== Feminism ===
Postmodern feminism mixes postmodern theory and French feminism that rejects a universal female subject. The goal is to destabilize the patriarchal norms entrenched in society that have led to gender inequality. Essentialism, philosophy, and universal truths are opposed, in favor of embracing the differences that exist amongst women to demonstrate that not all women are the same. Applying universal truths to all women in a society minimizes individual experience; ideas displayed as the norm in society stem from masculine notions of how women should be portrayed.

Postmodern feminism seeks to analyze notions that have led to gender inequality, and attempts to promote equality through critiquing logocentrism, supporting multiple discourses, deconstructing texts, and seeking to promote subjectivity. This approach is not readily accepted by all feminists—some believe postmodern thought undermines the attacks that feminist theory attempts to create, while other feminists are in favor of the union.

=== Law ===
In response to the perceived shortcomings of legal formalism and positivism, postmodern legal scholars developed several new approaches to address both formal and ethical issues in jurisprudence. In particular, they emphasize the inequalities introduced to the legal system by such matters as race, gender, and economic status.

=== Psychology ===
In 1992, the Los Angeles Times reported on "a group of increasingly influential psychologists – postmodern psychologists seems to be the name that is sticking", who had come to the conclusion that "the American conception of an isolated, unified self" does not exist. People are composed of many different selves, constructed for different situations. In this way, postmodernism challenges the modernist view of psychology as the science of the individual, in favor of seeing humans as a cultural/communal product, dominated by language rather than by an inner self.

In 2001, Kenneth Gergen, a pioneer in postmodern psychological theory, identified "emphasis on the individual mind, an objectively knowable world, and language as carrier of truth" as the cornerstones of traditional modernist psychology. He noted criticism of these assumptions coming from "every quarter of the humanities and the sciences", and the emergence of a psychology in which "colonialist universalism is replaced by a global conversation among equals". He also considered the "strong critical reservation", including the realist argument that a socially constructed world cannot negate a clearly observable objective reality; the claim of incoherence, wherein postmodernism denies truth and objectivity while simultaneously making truth claims; and its moral relativism, which fails to take a principled ethical stand. Ultimately, he concluded that psychology's future is "hanging in the balance".

In 2021, psychologist Jan Smedslund discussed how psychology tried for decades to emulate the natural sciences and address unpredictable individual behavior. He described how the dominant methodology came to rely exclusively on statistical analysis of group-level data and average findings, whereby it "lost contact with the psychological processes going on in individual persons." He advocated for abandoning the natural science approach that had "led into a clearly discernible blind alley."

In 2024, American psychology professor Edwin Gantt wrote that psychology remains in a state of continual struggle "to decide whether its true intellectual home is to be found among the humanities, especially philosophy and literature, or among the STEM disciplines." He finds psychology "a key site where the intellectual tug-of-war between modernism and postmodernism plays itself out in academia."

=== Urban planning ===
Modernism sought to design and plan cities that followed the logic of the new model of industrial mass production; reverting to large-scale solutions, aesthetic standardization, and prefabricated design solutions. This approach was found to have eroded urban living by its failure to recognize differences and aim towards homogeneous landscapes. Jane Jacobs's 1961 book The Death and Life of Great American Cities, was a sustained critique of urban planning as it had developed within modernism, and played a major role in turning public opinion against modernist planners, notably Robert Moses.

Postmodern urban planning involves theories that embrace and aim to create diversity, elevating uncertainty, flexibility, and change, and rejecting utopianism while embracing a utopian way of thinking and acting. The postmodernity of "resistance" seeks to deconstruct modernism, a critique of the origins without necessarily returning to them.

=== Theology ===
The postmodern theological movement interprets Christian theology in light of postmodern theory and various forms of post-Heideggerian thought, using approaches such as poststructuralism, phenomenology, and deconstruction to question fixed interpretations, explore the role of lived experience, and uncover hidden textual assumptions and contradictions. The movement emerged in the 1980s and 1990s when a handful of philosophers who took philosopher Martin Heidegger as a common point of departure began publishing books engaging with Christian theology.

Theologian Kevin J. Vanhoozer combines and expands on other scholarly classifications to present seven types of postmodern theology: postliberal, postmetaphysical, deconstructive, reconstructive, feminist, Anglo-American postmodernity, and radical orthodoxy. He notes that the typology should be considered "provisional and fallible [yet] not entirely arbitrary", having met two main criteria: each is an approach taken by more than one theologian, and each "believes itself to be responding to, rejecting, or passing through modernity, not inhabiting it."

== In popular culture ==
=== Fashion ===
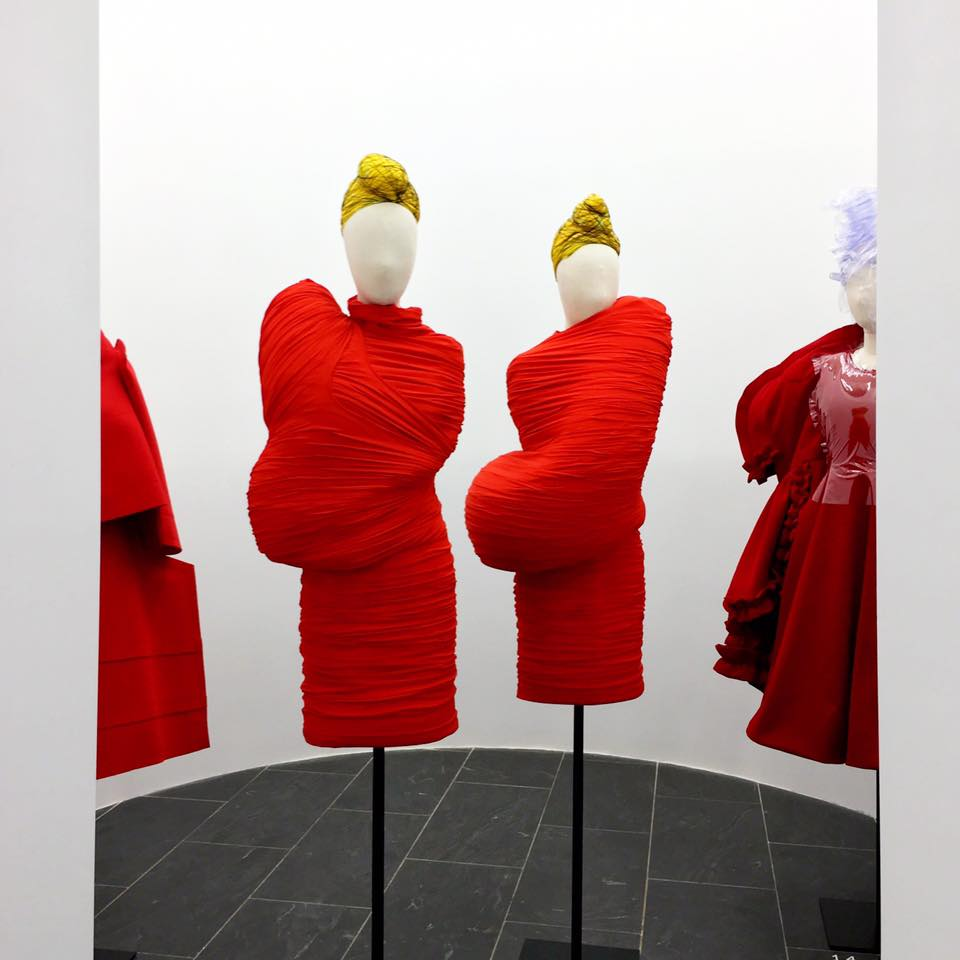
Padded dresses by Rei Kawakubo (1997)

One manifestation of postmodernism in fashion explored alternatives to conventional concepts of elegance: Rei Kawakubo’s Spring/Summer 1997 collection featured "dresses asymmetrically padded with goose down, creating bumps in unexpected areas of the body". Issey Miyake's 1985 dreadlocks hat "offered an immediate, yet impermanent, 'multi-culti' fashion experience". Vivienne Westwood took "an extremely polyglot approach", from early work with copies of 1950s clothes, to exploration of historic modes and cultural influences. In 1981, her first runway show, "Pirate", merged British history, 18th- and 19th-century dress, and African textile design, with a rap and ethnic music soundtrack.

The postmodern fashion sensibility appeared also through the subcultures of the 1960s and 1970s. Hippies, punks and other countercultural groups constructed their own nonconformist identities through choices in music, drugs, slang, and appearance. As these styles gained mainstream popularity, critics claim they lost their deeper meaning: "the adoption of surface attributes offers the frisson of rebellion without a commitment to a subcultural lifestyle."

=== Graphic design ===
Early mention of postmodernism in graphic design appeared in the British magazine, Design, during the late 1960s. The discussion took a pragmatic if not entirely comfortable view of graphic design as engaging with the economic necessities of a changing world. Graphic design had the role of "active stylization of product surfaces (such as those of packaging and promotion)", engaging without moralizing with consumer desires. Editor Corin Hughes-Stanton concluded, "Post-Modernism' is an attitude that takes the form of a creative response to unfolding developments in the socio-economic sphere; it is a sign of active engagement rather than an academic retreat from its commercial and professional concerns."

=== Marketing ===
Postmodernism in marketing focuses on customized experiences where broad market generalizations are no longer applied. According to academic Stephen Brown, "Marketers know about consumers, consumers know about marketers, marketers know consumers know about marketers, and consumers know marketers know consumers know about marketers." Brown, writing in 1993, stated that the postmodern approach in many ways rejects attempts to impose order and work in silos. Instead marketers should work collectively with "artistic" attributes of intuition, creativity, spontaneity, speculation, emotion, and involvement.

== Ongoing influence ==
Since the late 1990s, there has been a growing sentiment in popular culture and in academia that postmodernism "has gone out of fashion". Others argue that postmodernism is dead in the context of current cultural production.

A 2020 study investigated the reported transition from postmodernism to post-postmodernism, those "changing social conditions that lead the consumer to consume in a particular manner". Song lyrics were selected from Madonna (postmodern), Taylor Swift (post-postmodern), and Lady Gaga as a transitional example. Five postmodern characteristics consistently found in marketing literature were compared to their post-postmodern counterparts: anti-foundationalism to rewriting; dedifferentiation to redifferentiation; fragmentation to reengagement; reversal of production and consumption to rebalancing of production and consumption; and hyperreality to alternative reality. Postmodernism, it finds, "remains vibrant, re-inventive, and calls for its demise may be somewhat overblown." Swift's success "suggests a significant shift from deconstructive to reconstructive positions regarding the self and its surroundings", noting that her "post-postmodern engagement, enthusiasm and sincerity" appeared to be "somewhat superficial, sociopathic, and couched in fabulation."

The connection between postmodernism, posthumanism, and cyborgism has led to a challenge to postmodernism, for which the terms Post-postmodernism and postpoststructuralism were first coined in 2003. A small group of critics has put forth a range of theories that aim to describe culture or society in the alleged aftermath of postmodernism, most notably Raoul Eshelman (performatism), Gilles Lipovetsky (hypermodernity), Nicolas Bourriaud (altermodern), and Alan Kirby (digimodernism, formerly called pseudo-modernism). None of these new theories or labels have so far gained very widespread acceptance.

Writing in 2022, Steven Connor argues that, despite continuing reports of its death or imminent demise, postmodernism has instead undergone a kind of disappearance into the general culture by way of assimilation. He notes there is little that can now be called postmodern style because "the clashing or commingling of styles has become entirely routine at all levels of culture." The energizing antagonism between high and low culture has been "pestled into a tepid porridge." And the general postmodern condition is now "universal, irreversible and metastable, embodied above all in the massive increase in digitally mediated information technologies." According to Connor, postmodernism in the 2020s is a sensibility that has been integrated into everyday life, having been subject to a considerable degree of shifting, perhaps temporarily, from irony, pluralism and ambivalence to urgency, indignation, and reductive absolutism.

== See also ==
Theory

- Anti-foundationalism – Epistemology without sure premises
- Transmodernism – Philosophical and cultural movement

Culture and politics

- Defamiliarization – Artistic technique

Religion

- Postmodern religion – Religion influenced by postmodernism

History

- Second modernity – Transformation into information society

Opposed by

- Altermodern – Method of considering an artwork
- Metamodernism – Movement that emerged from and reacts to postmodernism
- Remodernism – Present-day modernist philosophical movement
