= Marcus Coates =

- Born: 1968 (age 57–58); London, United Kingdom
- Known for: Conceptual art; performance art; shamanism
- Notable work: Journey to the Lower World (2004); The Plover’s Wing (2009) "The Directors"(2022)
- Website: https://www.marcuscoates.co.uk

Marcus Coates is a contemporary artist and ornithologist living in London. His works, including performances and installations that have been recorded as video art, employ shamanistic rituals in communication with "the lower world", and contrast natural and man-made processes.

== Career ==
Coates was born in 1968 in London, UK. He graduated from the Kent Institute of Art and Design in 1990 and completed his MA at the Royal Academy Schools, London, in 1993.

Some of his work has focused on housing in Elephant and Castle, South London, including a film (Vision Quest – a Ritual for Elephant & Castle) and an on-stage trance in 2009. In 2013 Coates was a shortlisted for the Fourth plinth, Trafalgar Square artwork (2015/16). His proposal for the fourth plinth commission is to cast and install a replica of the "Eagle Rock" at Brimham Rocks in Yorkshire, UK. In 2022 Coates was commissioned by Artangel to make The Directors — five films made in collaboration with individuals with lived experiences of psychosis.

Coates has exhibited extensively internationally since 1999 including Altermodern, the Tate Triennial and Kunsthalle Zurich in 2009 and "Super 8" at the Museum of Modern Art Rio de Janeiro and "Galápagos" at the Centro de Arte Moderna in Lisbon, Portugal in 2013.

== Publications ==
In 2001, Grizedale Arts published the eponymous book Marcus Coates, based on his residency at Grizedale Arts in 1999. This was followed by The Trip which was published by Koenig Books, and documents his installation at the Serpentine Gallery, London in 2011.

== Notable exhibitions ==
- 2022 "The Directors", Artangel, London
- 2013 "Anchorhold – Meetings with Marcus Coates", Hai arts, Island of Hailuoto, Finland
- 2013 "Follow the Voice, City in the City", Canary Wharf Screen, Art on the Underground, London.
- 2012 "Proxy", Kate MacGarry, London, UK
- 2012 "Marcus Coates", Workplace Gallery, Gateshead, UK
- 2012 "Dawn Chorus", Aberystwyth Arts Centre, Wales, UK
- 2012 "Follow The Voice", Canary Wharf, Screen, London, UK
- 2012 "Vision Quest: a ritual for Elephant & Castle", Elephant & Castle Shopping Centre, London
- 2012 "Stories from the Lower World", South Alberta Art Gallery, Canada
- 2012 "Eva International Biennial of Visual Art", Limerick City, Ireland
- 2011 "Skills Exchange: Urban Transformation and the Politics of Care, a project for the Process Room at the Serpentine Gallery", London
- 2011 "The Trip", Serpentine Gallery, London
- 2010 "Implicit Sound", ESPAI 13, Fundació Joan Miró, Barcelona
- 2010 "Questions & Answers", Kate MacGarry, London
- 2010 Port Eliot Festival, Cornwall (performance)
- 2010 "Psychopomp", Milton Keynes Gallery
- 2009 Altermodern, Tate Britain, London
- 2009 "Marcus Coates", Mori Art Museum, Tokyo (performance)
- 2009 "Marcus Coates", Kunsthalle Zurich – Parallel Space (exhibition and performance)
- 2009 "The Plover's Wing", Workplace Gallery, Gateshead
- 2008 "Marcus Coates", NOMA New Orleans Museum of Art
- 2008 "Marcus Coates", Kunsthalle Zurich – Parallel Space (exhibition and performance)
