= Inger Lise Husøy =

Norwegian trade unionist and politician

Inger Lise Husøy (born 30 January 1957) is a Norwegian trade unionist and politician for the Norwegian Labour Party.

She was born in Grytten Municipality (present-day Rauma Municipality), as a daughter of Gunnar Husøy and Karin Nord. She took her primary and secondary education in Åndalsnes, and also attended Borgund Folk High School and various colleges in the late 1970s and early 1980s. She worked in the newspaper Verdens Gang from 1980 to 1984, and later as a consultant for Fafo Institute for Labour and Social Research from 1986 to 1987 and National Institute for Consumer Research from 1987 to 1991.

In between, from 1984 to 1986, she worked as a secretary for the Labour Party in Oslo. She was a deputy member of Oslo city council from 1987 to 1991, and served on the board of the local party chapter from 1988 to 1998. She served as a deputy representative to the Parliament of Norway from Oslo during the terms 1989–1993 and 1993–1997. She met in Parliament on a regular basis in November 1991 (replacing cabinet member Bjørn Tore Godal) and from 1993 to 1997 (replacing cabinet members Thorbjørn Berntsen and Jens Stoltenberg). She then served as a regular representative during one term, being a member of the Standing Committee on Scrutiny and Constitutional Affairs.

She was also a board member of Oslo faglige samorg from 1991 to 2007, national board member of the Norwegian Civil Service Union from 1995 to 1999 and leader of the international committee in Oslo's branch of the Norwegian Confederation of Trade Unions from 1997 to 2007. From 2001 to 2007, she also took various education at both the Oslo University College, the Norwegian School of Management and the University of Oslo. She chaired the Labour Party branch in Gamle Oslo from 2000 to 2003. She was also involved in solidarity and peace work, as member of the board and Fellesutvalget for Palestina from 2001 to 2006 and county leader of Nei til Atomvåpen from 2002 to 2003. From 2006 to 2013 she worked as manager of the Norwegian Burma Committee.

She is a cohabitant of fellow trade unionist and politician Kleiv Fiskvik.
