= Norwegian Burma Committee =

The Norwegian Burma Committee (Norwegian: Den norske Burmakomité, DnK) is a Norwegian advocacy group.

It was established on 2 January 1992 with the mandate to support and strengthen the Burmese democracy movement. Originally named the Norwegian Burma Council, it took its current name in 2001.

The NBCs work is primarily conducted through financial support to projects in Burma and through political advocacy in Norway. The NBC supports Aung San Suu Kyi and the National League for Democracy and was founded as a direct result of the Nobel Peace Prize being awarded to Aung San Suu Kyi in 1991. The Norwegian Burma Committee is supported financially by the Norwegian Ministry of Foreign Affairs and the Norwegian Agency for Development Cooperation.

The administrative manager is Inger Lise Husøy, while chairman of the board is professor Harald Bøckman. The offices are in Oslo.
