= 2027 in Norway =

- Centuries: 19th; 20th; 21st
- Decades: 2000s; 2010s; 2020s
- See also: List of years in Norway

Events in the year 2027 in Norway.

== Events ==
=== Predicted and scheduled ===
- 2 August – Solar eclipse of August 2, 2027 (partial eclipse)
- 2026–27 Norwegian Football Cup

== Holidays ==
- 1 January – New Year's Day
- 2 April – Maundy Thursday
- 3 April – Good Friday
- 5 April – Easter Sunday
- 6 April – Easter Monday
- 1 May – Labour Day
- 14 May – Ascension Day
- 17 May – Constitution Day
- 24 May – Pentecost
- 25 May – Whit Monday
- 24 December – Christmas Eve
- 25 December – Christmas Day
- 26 December – 2nd Day of Christmas
