= Ingar Tore Narvhus =

Norwegian major general (1927–2026)

- Born: Ingar Tore Johannessen; 3 September 1927; Oslo, Norway
- Died: 21 July 2026 (aged 98); Sandefjord, Norway
- Burial place: Orelund kapell og gravlund
- Military career
- Allegiance: Norway
- Branch: Royal Norwegian Air Force
- Service years: 1948–1981
- Rank: Major general
- Commands: Chief of the Royal Norwegian Air Force (1978–1981)

Ingar Tore Narvhus (3 September 1927 – 22 July 2026) was a Norwegian military aviator and air force officer who served as the Chief of the Royal Norwegian Air Force from 1978 to 1981. He served as a fighter pilot, military attaché, and representative at international disarmament negotiations in Vienna.

== Life and career ==
Ingar Tore Narvhus was born on 3 September 1927 in Oslo but grew up in Notodden, where his father was involved in local resistance activities during World War II. He was educated at the Norwegian Air Force Flight School in 1947 as a navigator and later as a fighter pilot in the United States. He was a student at the first class of the Royal Norwegian Air Force Academy from 1949 to 1951, and at the Norwegian Air Force Staff School from 1959 to 1960. After serving as a pilot in several squadrons, he became a squadron commander at 339 Special Operations Aviation Squadron in 1956. In 1960, he became the first Norwegian to fly twice the speed of sound.

He served in the long-term planning group in the Norwegian Air Force High Command, held positions as operations group commander in Bodø, been Air Service Inspector at the Fighter Aircraft Office in the Royal Norwegian Air Force, commander of Andøya Air Station, commander of Bodø Main Air Station, air commander in Northern Norway and Chief of the Royal Norwegian Air Force. He was also Deputy Commander of NATO's Northern Command and Commander of NATO's Air Forces in Northern Europe. He concluded 40 years of service in the Norwegian Armed Forces as a representative at the disarmament negotiations in Vienna and defense attaché in Austria and Yugoslavia. From 1987 to 1997, he was principal of the Norwegian State Commercial Aviation School.

Narvhus died on 21 July 2026, at the age of 98.
