= Hypermodernity =

Stage of society in postmodernism

Hypermodernity (or supermodernity) is a type, mode, or stage of society that reflects an inversion of modernity. Hypermodernism stipulates a world in which the object has been replaced by its own attributes. The new attribute-driven world is driven by the rise of technology and aspires to a convergence between technology and biology and more importantly information and matter. Hypermodernism finds its validation in emphasis on the value of new technology to overcome natural limitations. It rejects essentialism and instead favours postmodernism. In hypermodernism the function of an object has its reference point in the form of an object rather than function being the reference point for form. In other words, it describes an epoch in which teleological meaning is reversed from the standpoint of functionalism in favour of constructivism.

== Hypermodernity ==
Hypermodernity emphasizes a hyperbolic separation between past and present because:

- The past oriented attributes and their functions around objects.
- Objects that do exist in the present are only extant due to some useful attribute in the hypermodern era.

Hypermodernity inverts modernity to allow the attributes of an object to provide even more individuality than modernism. Modernity trapped form within the bounds of limited function; hypermodernity posits that function is now evolving so rapidly, it must take its reference point from form itself. Both positive and negative societal changes occur due to hyper-individualism and increased personal choice.

Postmodernity rejected the idea of the past as a reference point and curated objects from the past for the sole purpose of freeing form from function. In postmodernism, truth was ephemeral as the focus was to avoid non-falsifiable tenets. Postmodernity described a total collapse of modernity and its faith in progress and improvement in empowering the individual.

== Supermodernity ==
If distinguished from hypermodernity, supermodernity is a step beyond the ontological emptiness of postmodernism and relies upon plausible heuristic truths. Whereas modernism focused upon the creation of great truths (or what Lyotard called "master narratives" or "metanarratives"), and postmodernity was intent upon their destruction (deconstruction); supermodernity operates extraneously of meta-truth. Instead, attributes are extracted from objects of the past based on their present relevance. Since attributes are both true and false, a truth value is not necessary including falsifiability. Supermodernity curates useful attributes from modern and postmodern objects in order to escape nihilistic postmodern tautology. Related authors are Terry Eagleton After Theory, and Marc Augé Non-Places: Introduction to an Anthropology of Supermodernity.

== See also ==
- Altermodern
- Hypermodernism
- Hypermodernism (chess)
- Metamodernism

== Bibliography ==
- S. Charles and G. Lipovetsky, Hypermodern Times, Polity Press, 2006.
- S. Charles, Hypermodern Explained to Children, Liber, 2007 (in French).
- R. Colonna, L'essere contro l'umano. Preludi per una filosofia della surmodernità, Edises, Napoli, 2010 (in Italian).
- F. Schoumacher, Eidolon: simulacre et hypermodernité, Paris, Balland, 2024.
