= Kai Krüger =

Norwegian jurist and professor of law (1940–2026)

Kai Krüger (4 May 1940 – 12 August 2026) was a Norwegian jurist and professor of law at the University of Bergen.

== Life and career ==
Kai Krüger was born in Copenhagen, Denmark, but moved to Norway when he was six years old. He graduated as cand.jur. from the University of Oslo in 1966 and as dr.juris in 1979 with the dissertation "Særlig om deviasjon i sjøtransport". In the same year, he was appointed professor of law at the University of Bergen.

His main work, Norsk kontraktsrett, was finished in 1989. He received the Meltzers award for this book and his other scholarly activity at the University of Bergen in 1990. In 1994, he became a member of the Norwegian Academy of Science and Letters.

Krüger died on 12 August 2026, at the age of 86.
