= Herman Kristoffersen =

Norwegian politician

Herman Kristoffersen (24 August 1947 – 20 November 2026) was a Norwegian politician for the Labour Party. He is known as a former mayor of Tromsø.

Kristoffersen was elected mayor in 1999, and again in 2003. In 2003 however, he had to form a coalition with the Socialist Left Party in order to take office. Kristoffersen did not stand for re-election in 2007. He was succeeded by Arild Hausberg of the same party.

Kristoffersen is popularly known as Red Herman reflecting his former involvement in the Workers' Communist Party and the Red Electoral Alliance.

Kristoffersen died on 20 November 2026, at the age of 79.
