= Ivar Bjørklund =

Norwegian anthropologist and writer (1949–2026)

Ivar Bjørklund (1949 – 14 February 2026) was a Norwegian anthropologist and writer.

Bjørklund was born on 25 December 1949. He was professor of cultural studies at the University of Tromsø – The Arctic University of Norway and a researcher on interethnic relations in Northern Norway. In 2019, he was co-editor and co-author of the two-volume work Erindringer – Sami accounts of the Kautokeino uprising's background, ethics and morality, which was published in Sami as Muitalusat. Bjørklund died on 14 February 2026, at the age of 76.
