= Per Haftorsen =

Norwegian footballer (1947–2026)

Personal information
- Date of birth: 6 September 1947
- Place of birth: Haugesund, Norway
- Date of death: 17 October 2026 (aged 79)
- Place of death: Haugesund, Norway
- Position: Goalkeeper

Senior career*
Years	Team	Apps	(Gls)
1966–1970	Haugar		
1971–1974	Fredrikstad	69	(0)
1975–1979	Haugar		

International career
1965	Norway U19	5	(0)
1970–1971	Norway U21	6	(0)
1969–1972	Norway	12	(0)
- * Club domestic league appearances and goals

Per Haftorsen (6 September 1947 – 17 October 2026) was a Norwegian football goalkeeper. He spent the majority of his career with his hometown team SK Haugar, where he became recognised as one of Norway's best goalkeepers despite playing in the second tier of the Norwegian league. He made his international debut in 1969 while still a member of Haugar, coming on as a substitute for Kjell Kaspersen in a friendly against Poland.

== Career ==
In 1971, Haftorsen joined top-flight Fredrikstad where he played four seasons, and was a member of the Fredrikstad sides that reached the 1971 Cup Final, and finished second in the league in 1972. He returned to Haugar after the 1974 season.

Haftorsen played a total of 12 international games for Norway. He was on the winning side in four of those matches, and kept a clear sheet twice, but was never selected again for the national team after Norway's 9–0 defeat against the Netherlands in a 1972 World Cup qualifier.

== Personal life and death ==
His son, Per Andreas Haftorsen, also became a goalkeeper who played for Brann, Haugesund and Norway U21 in the 1990s.

Per Haftorsen died on 17 October 2026, at the age of 79.
