= Chief of the Royal Norwegian Air Force =

Norwegian military position

- Sjef Luftforsvaret (Norwegian)
- Incumbent; Major General Øivind Gunnerud since 9 August 2024
- Royal Norwegian Air Force
- Reports to: Chief of Defence
- Precursor: Inspector General of the Air Force
- Formation: 1944 (historic); 2017 (current)

The Chief of the Royal Norwegian Air Force (Norwegian: Sjef Luftforsvaret) is the most senior officer in the Royal Norwegian Air Force. The incumbent is Major General Øivind Gunnerud.

== List of officeholders ==
No.	Portrait	Name (born–died)	Term of office			Ref.
No.	Portrait	Name (born–died)	Took office	Left office	Time in office	Ref.
Sjef for Luftforsvaret
1		Hjalmar Riiser-Larsen (1890–1965)	1944	1946	1–2 years	
Generalinspektør for Luftforsvaret
1		Kåre Stenwig (1916–2005)	13 June 1969	1975	5–6 years	
Sjef Luftforsvaret
1		Tonje Skinnarland (born 1967)	February 2017	11 August 2021	4 years, 6 months	
2		Rolf Folland (born 1968)	11 August 2021	9 August 2024	2 years, 364 days	
3		Øivind Gunnerud (born 1970)	9 August 2024	Incumbent	2 years, 29 days	
