= Knut Midgaard =

Norwegian political scientist (1931–2026)

Knut Midgaard (11 February 1931 – 30 March 2026) was a Norwegian political scientist.

== Life and career ==
Born in Oslo on 11 February 1931, he first studied the history of ideas. In 1958 he was among the proponents of the Norwegian Institute of International Affairs, and in 1959 he graduated with the mag.art. degree. He was briefly lecturer at the University of Oslo before getting a NAVF scholarship as a research fellow at the Nansen Institute and Harvard University.

Midgaard was later research fellow in the history of ideas at the University of Oslo from 1962, then associate professor in political science from 1968. He advanced to docent in 1971 and professor in 1975, studying game theory, international politics and political theory among others. He chaired the committee that produced the Norwegian Official Report 1985:17.

He was a member of the Norwegian Academy of Science and Letters from 1993 and the Royal Norwegian Society of Sciences and Letters from 2009, and a Festschrift was issued to him in 1992.

Midgaard died on 30 March 2026, at the age of 95.
