= Altermodern =

Method of considering an artwork

Altermodern, a blend word defined by Nicolas Bourriaud, is an attempt at contextualizing art made in today's global context as a reaction against standardisation and commercialism. It is also the title of the Tate Britain's fourth Triennial exhibition curated by Bourriaud.

== Concept ==
In his keynote speech to the 2005 Art Association of Australia & New Zealand Conference, Nicolas Bourriaud said:

Artists are looking for a new modernity that would be based on translation: What matters today is to translate the cultural values of cultural groups and to connect them to the world network. This “reloading process” of modernism according to the twenty-first-century issues could be called altermodernism, a movement connected to the creolisation of cultures and the fight for autonomy, but also the possibility of producing singularities in a more and more standardized world.

Altermodern can essentially be read as an artist working in a hypermodern world or with supermodern ideas or themes.

== Exhibitions ==
=== Tate Britain 2009 ===
The Tate exhibition included a series of four one-day events (called "Prologues"), aiming to "introduce and provoke debate" around the Triennial's themes. Each Prologue included lectures, performances, film and a manifesto text and attempts to define what the curator sees as the four main facets of Altermodern:

1. The end of postmodernism
2. Cultural hybridisation
3. Travelling as a new way to produce forms
4. The expanding formats of art
