= Kleiv Fiskvik =

Norwegian politician

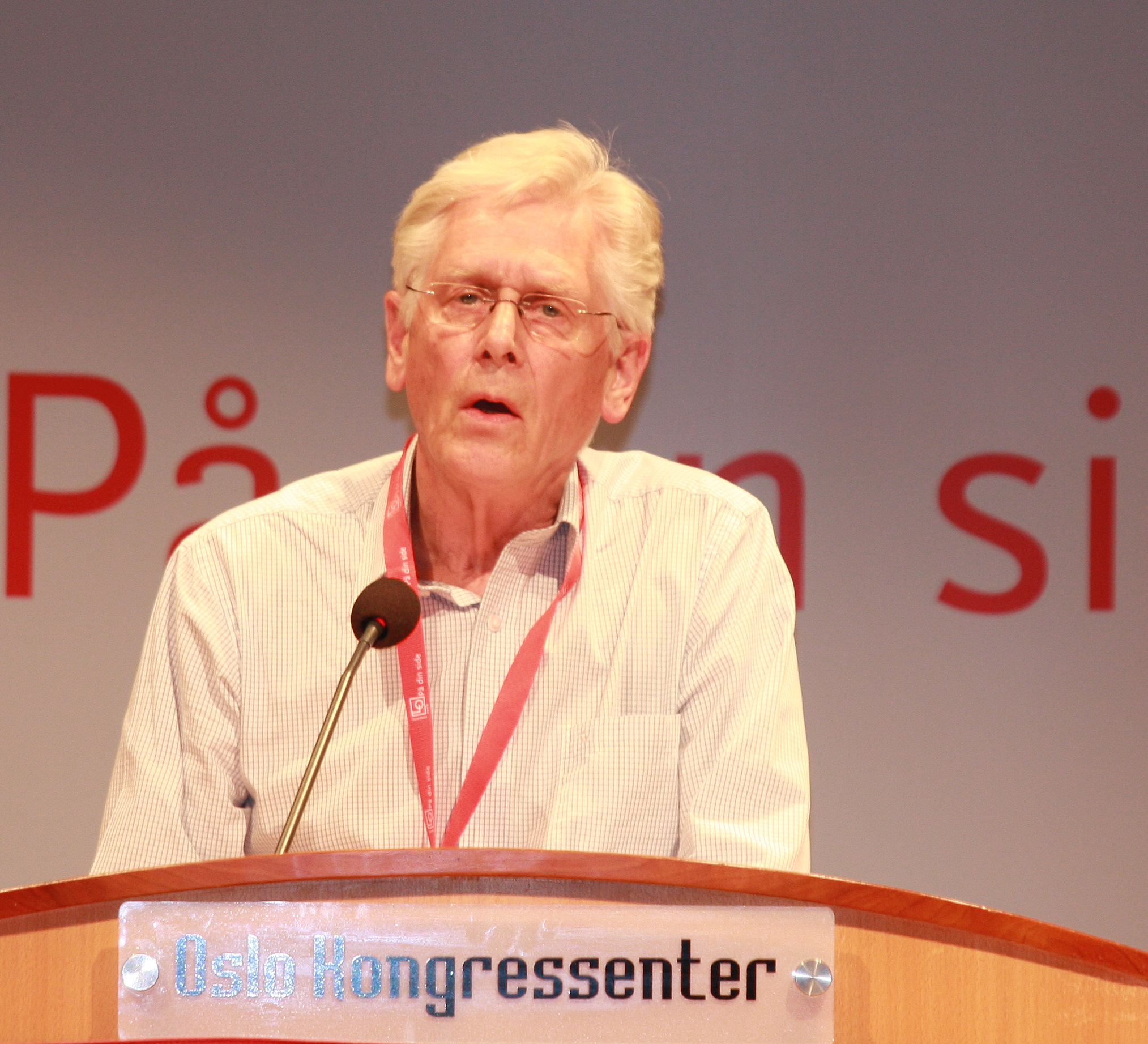
Kleiv Fiskvik

Kleiv Simon Fiskvik (7 August 1943 – 21 March 2026) was a Norwegian trade unionist president and politician.

Fiskvik was the leader of the Norwegian Confederation of Trade Unions in Norway's capital Oslo for many years, stepping down in 2009. He was formerly involved in the Norwegian Union of Municipal Employees.

Fiskvik was until 1997 a member of the Socialist Left Party, and was elected as a deputy representative to the Parliament of Norway from Oslo during the term 1989–1993. He was present during 4 days of parliamentary session. He was also a member of Furuset borough council in the 1990s. Fiskvik was later active in the Norwegian Labour Party.

He was a cohabitant of fellow politician Inger Lise Husøy. He did in March 2026, aged 82.
