= Jan Smedslund =

Norwegian psychologist (1929–2026)

Jan Ewald Smedslund (1 May 1929 – 18 March 2026) was a Norwegian psychologist.

He was born in Oslo, but grew up in Helsinki and finished his secondary education in Finland before studying psychology at the University of Oslo. He took the mag.art. degree in 1951 and the dr.philos. degree in 1955. In the 1950s and 1960s, he was a guest scholar in Geneva and at the Center for Cognitive Studies, Harvard University, and he was employed by the Norwegian Institute for Social Research.

From 1964, he held a professorship of psychology at the University of Bergen, changing to the University of Oslo in 1966. He was inducted into the Norwegian Academy of Science and Letters in 1975. His later guest scholar stints include the University of Minnesota, the University of Kansas, Stanford University, Oxford University and Cambridge University.

From 1977 to 2009, he was also a clinical psychologist with a private clinic. He resided in Oslo.
