= Deaths in June 1978 =

The following is a list of notable deaths in June 1978. Entries for each day are listed alphabetically by surname. A typical entry lists information in the following sequence:

- Name, age, country of citizenship at birth, subsequent country of citizenship (if applicable), reason for notability, cause of death (if known), and reference.

== June 1978 ==
=== 2 ===
- Santiago Bernabéu, 82, Spanish footballer, coach, and administrator, he is posthumously regarded as one of the most important figures in the history of Real Madrid, having served as its president for 34 years and 264 days, from 11 September 1943 until his death on 2 June 1978.

=== 4 ===
- Dominique Darel, 27 or 28 (date of birth uncertain), French model and actress, primarily active in the Italian cinema, she made her film debut in Luchino Visconti's historical drama Death in Venice (1971), then became a minor starlet in Italian genre cinema, for a pictorial that was published in the August 1974 issue of Playboy magazine, Darel and her boyfriend Max Delys were photographed nude by their associate Andy Warhol with his Polaroid camera, she was killed in a car accident.

=== 7 ===
- Ronald George Wreyford Norrish, 80, British chemist,as a result of the development of flash photolysis, Norrish was awarded the Nobel Prize in Chemistry in 1967 along with Manfred Eigen and George Porter for their study of extremely fast chemical reactions.

=== 8 ===
- Jenny Hasselquist, 83, Swedish prima ballerina, ballet teacher, and silent film actress,she appeared as a guest dancer in many of Europe's leading theatres, including the London Coliseum, the Théâtre des Champs-Élysées in Paris and the Deutsches Theater in Berlin.

=== 12 ===
- Norris Goff, 72, American actor and comedian, he co-created the rural comedy Lum and Abner, which was reportedly "one of the longest running and most popular programs ever on radio".

=== 14 ===
- Robert Fabian, 77, English police officer and crime writer,he rose to the rank of Detective Superintendent in the Metropolitan Police, his work as a crime writer was dramatised in the BBC police procedural series Fabian of the Yard (1954-1956), each episode ended with an epilogue in which Fabian described the real-life case on which the preceding story had been based, he subsequently wrote a somewhat salacious but revelatory account of Soho's vice trade in the book London After Dark (1954).
- Matty Matlock, 71, American clarinettist, saxophonist and arranger in the genre of Dixieland jazz,his entry in The Rough Guide to Jazz credits him as the arranger who perfected the sound of 'arranged white Dixieland', with his style setting the modern standard for the genre.

=== 16 ===
- Felicia Montealegre, 56, Costa Rican and American actress, beginning in 1949, she starred in leading roles on weekly television anthology dramas for Kraft Television Theatre (NBC), Studio One (CBS), Suspense (CBS), The Chevrolet Tele-Theatre (NBC) and The Philco Television Playhouse (NBC), among others,death caused by breast cancer that had metastasized to Montealegre's lungs.
- Joan Winfield, 59, Australian-born American actress, violinist, and philanthropist, she was offered several roles in the B films at the film studio Warner Bros.,; she was presented by the studio's publicists as a stereotypical pin-up girl, supposedly popular with Australian soldiers during World War II,she later became the President of the American charity organization SHARE, death caused by lung cancer.

=== 17 ===
- Niels Onstad, 69, Norwegian ship-owner and art collector,he and his wife Sonja Henie co-founded the art museum Henie-Onstad Art Centre (Henie Onstad Kunstsenter) at Høvikodden in Bærum.

=== 19 ===
- Mabel Wayne, 87, American composer and screenwriter,she is noted for being one of the first female composers to write successful hit songs, she was inducted to the Songwriters Hall of Fame in 1972.

=== 20 ===
- Mark Robson, 64, Canadian-American film director, producer, and editor, in 1940, Robson worked as an assistant to Robert Wise on the editing of Citizen Kane (1941), the film debut of Orson Welles; he and Wise also edited Welles' next film, The Magnificent Ambersons (1942), and made drastic cuts to the ending of the film, which Welles disagreed with,as a director, Robson's greatest hit was Peyton Place (1957) for 20th Century Fox, he was nominated for an Academy Award for Best Director for this film; he was nominated again for the same award the following year for directing The Inn of the Sixth Happiness (1958).

=== 21 ===
- Luther Youngdahl, 82, American politician and judge, he served as the governor of Minnesota from 1947 until 1951, as a governor, he increased funding for public education, expanded public housing, increased benefits for veterans, created activities to improve young people's health, desegregated the Minnesota National Guard, passed anti-discrimination laws in employment, and banned slot machines and strengthened anti-liquor laws despite the legislature's opposition, death caused by an unspecified "lingering illness".

=== 22 ===
- Tom Gorman, 77, Australian rugby league footballer,he was the first Queenslander to be named captain of a touring side when he was announced as Australian captain for the 1929–30 Kangaroo tour of Great Britain.

=== 23 ===
- Kim Winona, 47, American actress, sculptor, and enrolled member of the Santee Sioux people,she had a regular role as the character Morning Star in Western television series Brave Eagle (1955–1956),a show which was praised for casting several Native American actors in regular roles, and for having a Chippewa technical advisor.

=== 24 ===
- Ahmad al-Ghashmi, 42, Yemeni military officer and politician, he served as the President of the Yemen Arab Republic (North Yemen) from 1977 until his death in office in 1978, he reinstated the 1970 Constitution, which had been suspended by his predecessor Ibrahim al-Hamdi in 1974,; however, the Consultative Council was not reinstated, under his leadership, the Constituent People's Assembly approved the abolition of the Military Command Council, he was assassinated. Al-Ghashmi was meeting a diplomatic envoy sent by Salim Rubai Ali, the President of the People's Democratic Republic of Yemen (South Yemen), when a briefcase exploded, killing both al-Ghashmi and the envoy. It is not conclusively known who set off the explosion.

=== 26 ===
- Salim Rubaya Ali, 44, Yemeni Maoist politician and revolutionary, he served as the Chairman of the Presidential Council of South Yemen from 1969 until 1978,his government committed approximately 2,000 troops to support the Ethiopian government during the Ogaden War (1977–1978), and this deployment represented a significant expansion of South Yemen's regional military commitments in the Horn of Africa, Rubaya Ali was deposed and executed by the collective leadership of the Yemeni Socialist Party (YSP).

=== 28 ===
- Clifford Dupont, 72, British-born Rhodesian politician, solicitor, and rancher, he served as the Deputy Prime Minister of Rhodesia from 1964 until 1965,as the Officer Administrating the Government from 1965 until 1970,and as the first President of Rhodesia from 1970 until 1975,he died while undergoing radium treatment for cancer.

=== 29 ===
- Bob Crane, 49, American actor, drummer, and disc jockey, he had the starring role of Colonel Robert E. Hogan in the World War II-themed sitcom Hogan's Heroes,he was found dead in his own apartment, bludgeoned to death with a weapon that was never identified, though the local investigators believed it to be a camera tripod. An electrical cord had been tied around Crane's neck, but Crane's body showed no signs of strangulation.The crime scene yielded few clues; no evidence was found of forced entry, and nothing of value was missing.

=== 30 ===
- William F. Harrah, 66, American businessman, primarily active in the gambling industry, he used his political influence to create the Nevada Gaming Control Board in 1955, an organization designed to regulate gaming in Nevada,; in 1959, Harrah helped create an even stronger Gaming Commission to rid Nevada's casinos of corruption,he died on the operating table during a cardiac surgery operation to repair an aortic aneurysm.
- Frank Santillo, 65, American film editor, he won the Academy Award for Best Film Editing for his editing of the sports drama Grand Prix (1966),he died in his sleep, with the cause of death unclear.

== Sources ==
- Halliday, Fred (2002). Revolution and Foreign Policy: The Case of South Yemen, 1967-1987. Cambridge University Press. p. 336. ISBN 0-521-89164-7.
- John Meredyth Lucas (2004) Eighty Odd Years in Hollywood; Memoir of a Career in Film and Television. p. 171. McFarland & Co, North Carolina. ISBN 0 7864 1838 9
- Mandel, Leon (1982). William Fisk Harrah : The Life and Times of a Gambling Magnate. Doubleday. ISBN 0-385-15513-1.
