= Kristin Danielsen =

Kristin Danielsen may refer to:

- Kristin Danielsen (orienteer)
- Kristin Danielsen (dancer)
