= Blinker (disambiguation) =

A blinker, or turn signal, is a type of automotive lighting.

Blinker may also refer to:

- Blinkers (horse tack), to restrict a horse's vision
- Blinkers (film), a 2007 Spanish sports film
- Blink comparator, in early astrophotography
- Smoke deflector, on a steam locomotive
- Signal lamp, on a ship
- The Wright Brothers' early aircraft stabiliser

== People with the name ==
- Regi Blinker (born 1969), Dutch former professional footballer
- William Reginald Hall, known as "blinker".

== See also ==
- Blink (disambiguation)
