= Arts Council Norway =

Official arts council of Norway

The Arts Council Norway (Norwegian: Norsk kulturråd, often shortened to Kulturrådet) is the official arts council for Norway.

Based in Oslo, it is a Norwegian state institution created in 1965 (60 years ago) as a result of a parliamentary decision in 1964.

Arts Council Norway's administration is in charge of a broad spectrum of administrative tasks and functions within the cultural field, including artists' grants, the Audio and Visual Fund and a number of other funding schemes. In 2010, Arts Council Norway was merged with ABM-utvikling, the Norwegian Archive, Library and Museum Authority. The library functions were transferred to the National Library of Norway. In 2015, the archive functions were transferred to the National Archives of Norway.

Arts Council Norway administers funding schemes for literature, music, performing and visual arts, museum development, youth culture, cultural heritage and creative industries. Arts Council Norway also develops, funds and commissions cultural research projects and evaluations of major projects funded by the Cultural Fund. In addition, the administration is the main contact point for the EEA Grants Culture, Creative Europe and other international cultural cooperation efforts. The administration also houses the secretariat for The Cultural Rucksack.

== The Arts Council ==
The arts council is charged with managing the Norwegian culture fund, reviewing applications and allocating funds to achieve cultural objectives at the members' academic and artistic discretion, but consistent with the sitting Parliament's priorities. The council also serves as an advisory body for the public in cultural matters.

The Council may, on their own initiative, hold conferences, perform cultural experiments and initiate studies. The council annually awards the Arts Council Norway Honorary Prize (Norwegian: Norsk kulturråds ærespris).

Chairman of the arts council is Yngve Slettholm.

== Arts Council chairs ==
- Sigmund Løvåsen (appointed 2022)
- Lars Petter Hagen (appointed 2020)
- Tone Hansen (appointed 2016)
- Yngve Slettholm (appointed 2012)
- Bentein Baardson (appointed 2009)
- Vigdis Moe Skarstein (appointed 2001)
- Jon Bing (appointed 1993)
- Oddvar S. Kvam (appointed 1985)
- Edvard Beyer (appointed 1973)
- Hartvig Kiran (appointed 1981)
- Leif J. Wilhelmsen (appointed 1965)

== Administration ==
Halvdan Skard was the director from 1983 to 1992, but was then granted an absence of leave to become chairman of the Norwegian Association of Local and Regional Authorities. On 18 December 1992 it was announced that Lidvin Osland would serve as acting director until 1 July 1996. Osland stepped down as planned, but his successor was not appointed immediately, as the council rejected all applicants and asked for other candidates. On 20 September 1996, it was announced that Halvard Kausland had been appointed as acting director from 1 November 1996 to 31 March 2000. However, Kausland withdrew three days before actually assuming the post. The deputy director briefly advanced to become acting director during this vacancy. On 20 December Ole Jacob Bull was appointed. In early 2004, Skard finally quit as director. Bull applied to become the new director, and got the position on a permanent basis in July 2004.

Since October 2010, director of Arts Council Norway was Anne Aasheim, previously editor-in-chief of Dagbladet. After her death in 2016, Kristin Danielsen was appointed as director.

=== Directors ===
- Kristin Danielsen (appointed 2016)
- Anne Aasheim (appointed 2010)
- Ole Jacob Bull (appointed 1997)
- Lidvin Osland (appointed 1993)
- Halvdan Skard (appointed 1982)
- Åsmund Oftedal (appointed 1977)
- Ingeborg Lyche (appointed 1966)
