= Ole Jacob Bull =

Norwegian translator and cultural director

Ole Jacob Bull (born 11 March 1948) is a Norwegian translator and cultural director.

He holds the cand.mag. degree from 1974. He worked as director of the Norwegian Writers' Center from 1980 to 1982, studied abroad from 1982 to 1983 (and 1979 to 1980), and then worked in the publishing house Aschehoug Forlag from 1985 to 1997. He was acting director of the Arts Council Norway from 1997 to 2010 and he translates novels and plays from English, Swedish, and Danish.

Civic offices
Preceded by Lidvin Osland	Director of the Arts Council Norway; 1997–2010	Succeeded by Anne Aasheim
