= Lars Helle =

Norwegian journalist and editor (born 1962)

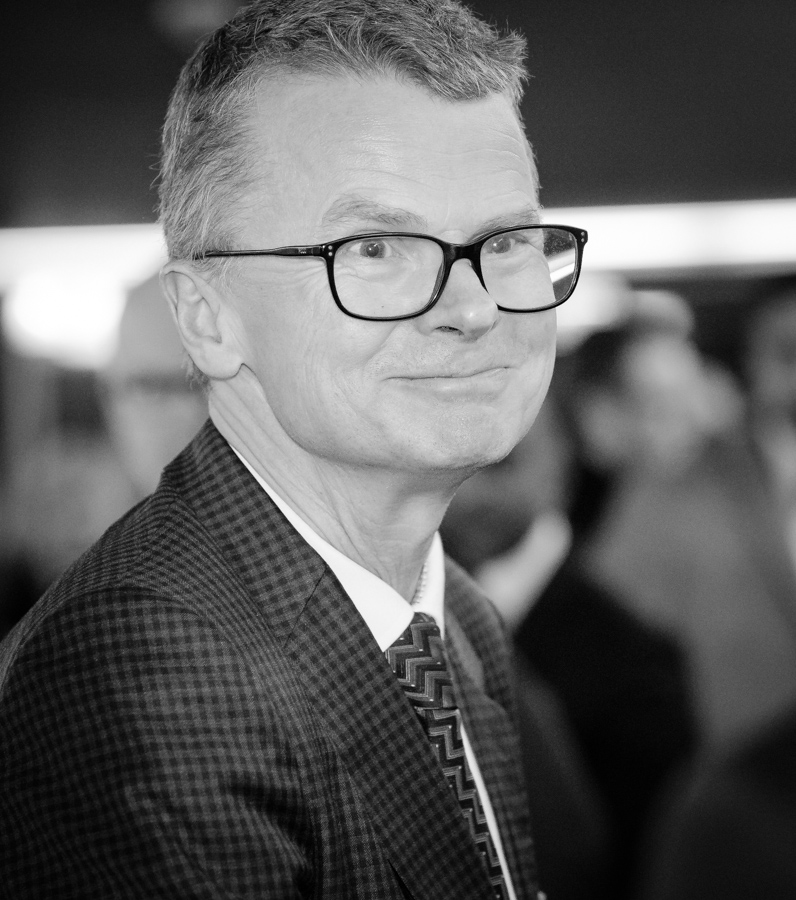
Lars Helle

Lars Helle (born 1 November 1962) is a Norwegian journalist and editor.

He was chief editor of Rogalands Avis from 1996 to 2000. He was then hired in Dagbladet, and held various mid-level leadership positions. When Thor Gjermund Eriksen withdrew in March 2006, Helle became acting chief editor. He stepped down in August the same year when Anne Aasheim was hired as the new editor. He held the position as ethics editor under Aasheim. In January 2010, Aasheim resigned and Helle became acting editor again.

In May 2010 the position was made permanent. He resigned in the autumn of 2011 to become editor-in-chief of Stavanger Aftenblad. Helle was chief editor of Stavanger Aftenblad from 2012 to 2021, and was succeeded by Kjersti Sortland.

He is married to journalist Hilde Torgersen.

Media offices
Preceded by Thor Gjermund Eriksen	Chief editor of Dagbladet (acting); March 2006–August 2006	Succeeded by Anne Aasheim
Preceded by Anne Aasheim	Chief editor of Dagbladet; May 2010–2011 (acting since January 2010)	Succeeded by John Arne Markussen
Preceded by Tom Hetland	Chief editor of Stavanger Aftenblad; 2012–2021	Succeeded by Kjersti Sortland
