= Leif Jarmann Wilhelmsen =

Norwegian philologist and civil servant

- Born: 13 December 1910; Stokke, Norway
- Died: 14 November 1976 (aged 65)
- Occupations: Philologist; Civil servant

Leif Jarmann Wilhelmsen (13 December 1910 – 14 November 1976) was a Norwegian philologist and civil servant.

He was born in Stokke to Thomas Wilhelmsen and Else Larsen. He served as cultural attaché in London from 1946 to 1949, and was director of the University of Bergen from 1949 to 1957. From 1957 to 1964 he was appointed at the Ministry of Culture and Education, and from 1965 to 1967 at the Norwegian Academy of Science and Letters. He chaired the Arts Council Norway from 1965 to 1972. He was decorated Knight, First Class of the Order of St. Olav in 1965.
