= Tone Hansen =

Norwegian museum director

- Born: 1970 (age 55–56); Kirkenes, Norway
- Education: Norwegian National Academy of Fine Arts
- Occupation: Museum director
- Employer(s): Henie Onstad Kunstsenter; Munch Museum

Tone Hansen (born 1970) is a Norwegian artist, curator and museum director. She has been director of the Munch Museum since 2022.

== Career ==
Born in Kirkenes in 1970, Hansen grew up in Klæbu Municipality. She studied at the Norwegian National Academy of Fine Arts between 1994 and 1998, and had further studies at Konsthögskolan i Malmö.

She was curator at the Henie Onstad Kunstsenter from 2008, and director of the museum from 2011 to 2022. From 2022 she was appointed director of the Munch Museum in Oslo.

She chaired the Arts Council Norway from 2016 to 2019.

Her publications include the book Hvordan tenke museum i dag? from 2007. She also edited the anthologies What does Public mean? from 2006, and The New Administration of Aesthetics from 2007.
