= Niels Onstad =

Norwegian shipowner and art collector

Niels Onstad (26 March 1909 – 17 June 1978) was a Norwegian shipowner and art collector.

== Biography ==
Niels Onstad was born in Kristiania (now Oslo), Norway. Onstad played football for SFK Lyn in his younger days. He played as defender on the club's first-team, including a feature in the 1928 Norwegian Football Cup final.

In 1935, together with his brother Haakon Onstad (1901-1980), he started the shipping company, Niels Onstad Tank Rederi A / S, which later was named Niels Onstads Tankrederi with headquarters in Oslo. Haakon Onstad had entered ship owning in 1932 with the Pan Gothia but because of the uncertain financial times the ship was given Swedish registry under Rederi A/B Pagota. In 1940, during the Occupation of Norway by Nazi Germany, Niels Onstad moved to New York City where he worked for the Norwegian Shipping and Trade Mission (Nortraship). Haakon Onstad relocated to Kungsbacka, Sweden, where he formed Rederi A/B Kungsoil and Rederi A/B Monacus.

In 1956, Niels Onstad married Sonja Henie. Onstad, whose mother had been a painter, had many contacts in the Norwegian art world, including Edvard Munch. Together, Onstad and Henie established the Henie-Onstad Art Centre (Henie Onstad Kunstsenter) at Høvikodden in Bærum southwest of Oslo. The Centre was opened in 1968, with a collection of art, and the building in which it is displayed, donated by the couple.

The ship Susanne Onstad was featured in the movie King Kong from 1976. The Susanne Onstad was the oil tanker that brought King Kong from Skull Island to the United States.

== Related reading ==
- Hovdenakk, Per; Susanne Rajka, Øivind Storm Bjerke (2007) Henie-Onstad kunstsenter (Oslo: Grøndahl og Dreyer) ISBN 9788250420953
