= Netzeitung =

German online newspaper

- Type: Online newspaper
- Owner(s): M. DuMont Schauberg
- Editor: Domenika Ahlrichs
- Founded: 2000
- Language: German
- Headquarters: Berlin
- Website: www.netzeitung.de

Netzeitung was a German online newspaper produced in Berlin from 2000 to 2009. On 4 January 2010 netzeitung.de had been converted into an automated portal displaying contents from nachrichten.de (an online news portal operated by Tomorrow Focus).

Netzeitung had claimed to be the first German newspaper that was completely online, and to have been the most cited news source in Germany in 2005. The paper went online in November 2000 and was started by the same company that publishes the Norwegian online newspaper Nettavisen.

In 2006, the paper employed some 60 journalists and reached, according to Michael Maier, then the chief editor, some 1.2 million households per month and was to earn €8 million. According to Google Ad Planner, the site ranked #25 in Germany in monthly visitors of news sites.

Chief editor was Domenika Ahlrichs (2007–2009). After 2007 the paper was owned by a subsidiary of the Mecom Group, which in January 2009 sold its German division to M. DuMont Schauberg.
