= Paramedics incident in Oslo 2007 =

Incident in Norway

The paramedics incident in Oslo 2007 involved two paramedics who were dispatched to Sofienberg park in Oslo, Norway, on August 6, 2007, in response to a reported head injury from an altercation. Upon arrival, paramedics determined the issue was not medically urgent, and requested police at the scene take the subject to the hospital as he appeared intoxicated and unruly. It was later revealed the man's injuries were indeed life-threatening, which led to public outcry and controversy in the months following the incident.

== Incident ==
While having a picnic in the park, a Somali-Norwegian man named Ali Farah claims he was physically assaulted and hit in the head by a 23-year-old male from Ghana. Farah was knocked to the ground after requesting the 23-year-old male and his friends to tone down their behavior. After the altercation, Farah's friends called for an ambulance, which arrived on the scene approximately 15 minutes later. The ambulance paramedic crew decided not to take Farah to the hospital as he seemed to be intoxicated. Farah reportedly urinated, with the urine hitting first the trouser leg of one of the paramedics and then the ambulance. The paramedics requested a police patrol present at the scene take Farah to the hospital. The ambulance left shortly thereafter, leaving Farah in the park. He was then transported in a taxi by his friends to a medical center where it was determined the injury to his head was life-threatening. He was diagnosed with intracranial hemorrhage and had to undergo surgery, after which he also developed meningitis. He was placed in a medically-induced coma for a few days and eventually recovered.

When the story first broke in the Norwegian media, the decision by the paramedics to leave Farah in the park led to a massive public outcry, and accusations of blatant racism were directed toward the paramedics by several politicians and leading figures, including Beate Gangås, the Norwegian Equality and Anti-Discrimination ombud.

The paramedics involved maintained their initial observation of the victim led them to believe he was not in need of urgent medical assistance, and they made the decision to have police escort him to the hospital after he urinated on one of the paramedics and the ambulance. Farah and his friends claimed the ambulance crew were hostile toward them, and that the paramedics did not perform a proper medical examination of the victim.

The paramedics were eventually removed from active duty due to their handling of the case, and fined for failing to give proper duty of care to Farah. Several subsequent inquiries and a court found the paramedics' actions, while "indefensible" and "unprofessional", could not be shown to be an act of racial discrimination.

== Media coverage of the event ==
The case was widely covered in Norwegian media, creating a heated national debate about the incident. Many media articles focused on the failure of the paramedics to properly deal with the victim and portrayed this incident as one of racial discrimination. The photograph media used to strengthen this claim showed an injured victim lying on the ground bleeding heavily from the nose. This picture contradicted the paramedic's claim that Farah was standing up when they left the scene. Later, a picture was published in the media that supported the paramedics' version in which Farah can be seen standing next to the ambulance as it is leaving the park.

=== Libel suit ===
In May 2011 Erik Schjenken won a libel suit against the Norwegian newspaper Dagbladet in the Oslo District Court, and was awarded one million Nkr on the grounds they had misrepresented facts and published factual errors regarding the case. In 2013, Dagbladet lost the appeal case in Borgarting Court of Appeal, but received a different ruling reducing the compensation awarded to Schjenken to 200,000 Nkr. Dagbladet appealed the case once more in May 2013 to the Supreme Court of Norway.

== Timeline ==
- Aug. 6, 2007: Ali Farah was assaulted by a 23-year-old male from Ghana at 5:05 p.m. The ambulance arrived on the scene at 5:13 p.m. Paramedics determine that Farah was intoxicated and should be taken to the hospital by the police. They decide to leave the scene without Farah at 5:20 p.m. Farah's friends hail a taxicab, which took Farah to a local medical center at 5:21 p.m. Farah arrived at the medical center 5 minutes later at 5:26 p.m. After examining Farah, a doctor decided his injuries required urgent hospital treatment. An ambulance was requested and arrived to transport Farah to Ullevål University Hospital, where he arrived at 7:13 p.m. Farah was then placed in a medically induced coma at 11:00 p.m.
- Aug. 11, 2007: The 23-year-old attacker was arrested and placed in police custody for two weeks.
- Aug. 13, 2007: The paramedics were removed from active duty.
- Aug. 19, 2007: Ali Farah woke up from the medically induced coma and was for the first time able to talk about the incident.
- Aug. 19, 2007: Petter Schou, the head medical advisor to the city of Oslo, concluded the paramedics were guilty of racism, and that they had acted in an unprofessional manner.
- March 27, 2008: The Equality and Anti-Discrimination Ombud concluded the paramedics were guilty of racism.
- June 18, 2008: The 23-year-old attacker was sentenced to 1 ½ years in prison by Oslo District Court. The sentence was appealed by the attacker’s legal team.
- Dec. 4, 2008: A Norwegian court decided Erik Schjenken, one of the paramedics, did not commit a criminal act when he left Ali Farah behind in the park.
- Dec. 6, 2008: Schjenken lodged a complaint with the Norwegian Parliamentary Ombudsman for Public Administration to have legal actions taken towards three Cabinet Members (chiefs of Government Departments) and Dagfinn Høybråten for defamation.
- Feb. 29, 2009: The Equality and Anti-Discrimination Ombud reversed its initial decision of March 27, 2008, in which it claimed Erik Schjenken was guilty of racism and completely exonerated the two paramedics of any wrongdoing.
- March 10, 2009: Erik Schjenken received a NOK 100,000 compensation payout from the Norwegian organization, Victims of the Media.
- March 18, 2009: The Parliamentary Ombudsman for Public Administration concluded there was no legal basis for Schjenken to pursue legal action against the four politicians.
- July 11, 2011: Dagbladet appealed the court order to pay restitution to Erik Schjenken.
- July 11, 2011: Documentary about how media coverage failed in this case.
- April 23, 2013: After appealing to the Borgarting Court of Appeal, Dagbladet received a different ruling and the compensation awarded to Schjenken was reduced to 200,000 Nkr.
