= Kjersti Sortland =

Norwegian newspaper editor

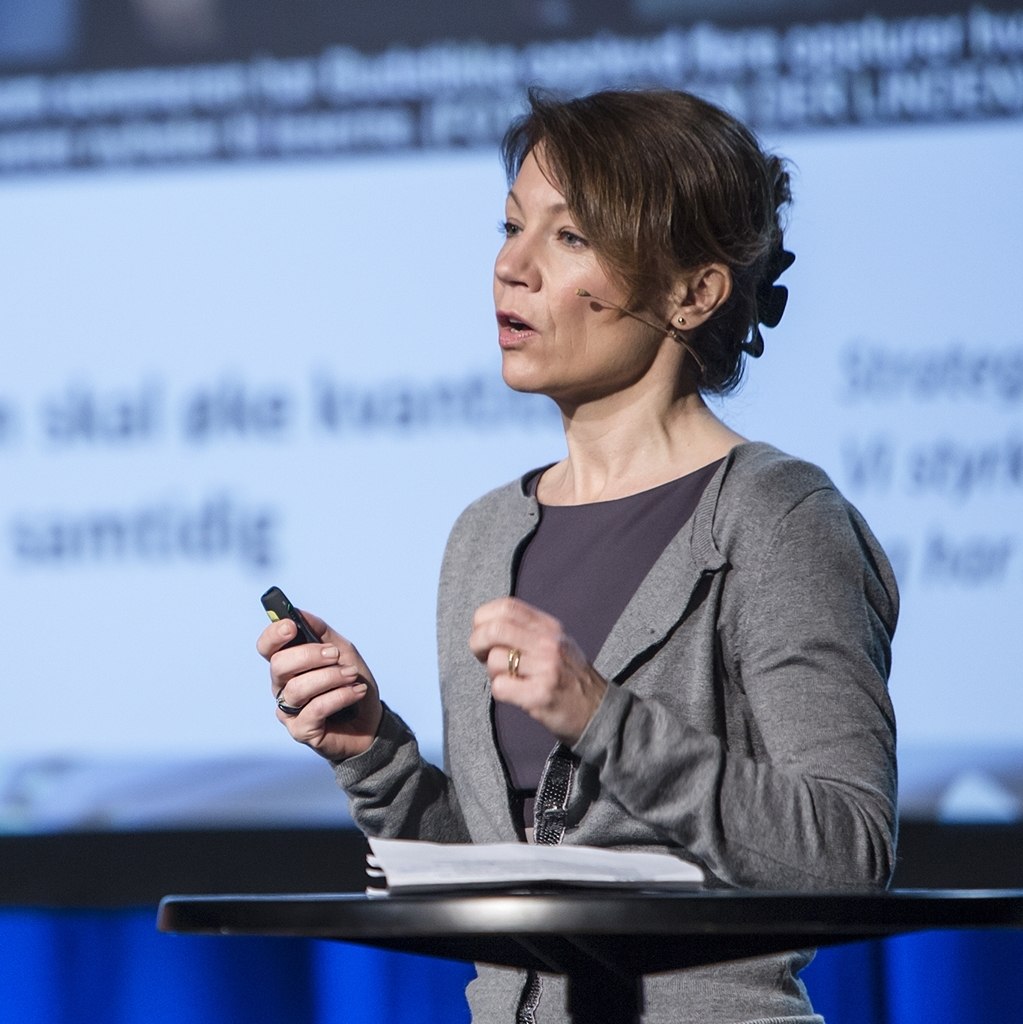
- Born: 23 November 1968 (age 57); Bømlo Municipality, Norway
- Education: Stavanger University College
- Occupations: journalist and newspaper editor

Kjersti Sortland (born 23 November 1968) is a Norwegian journalist, newspaper editor and media executive. She edited the newspaper Budstikka from 2013 to 2021, and has been editor-in-chief of the newspaper Stavanger Aftenblad since 2022.

== Biography ==
Sortland was born in Bømlo Municipality on 23 November 1968. She graduated as journalist from the Stavanger University College in 1989. She worked as journalist for the newspapers Bergensavisen, Stavanger Aftenblad and Bergens Tidende, and was then assigned with Verdens Gang from 1991 to 2013, where she assumed various positions.

From 2013 to 2021 she was chief editor of Budstikka, and from 2020 also managing director of the newspaper. She was honored Editor of the year 2017 by the Oslo Association of Editors.

In 2022 she was appointed editor-in-chief of Stavanger Aftenblad, succeeding Lars Helle.

Media offices
Preceded by Andreas Gjølme	Chief editor of Budstikka; 2013–2021	Succeeded by Karianne Steinsland
Preceded by Lars Helle	Chief editor of Stavanger Aftenblad; 2022–	Succeeded by
