= Budstikka =

Norwegian newspaper

- Type: Daily newspaper
- Format: Tabloid
- Owner: Edda Media (31.5%)
- Editor: Kjersti Sortland
- Founded: 1898
- Political alignment: Conservative; Non-partisan
- Headquarters: Billingstad, Norway
- Circulation: 28,258
- ISSN: 0808-9450
- Website: budstikka.no

Budstikka (The Bidding Stick), prior to 2004 known as Asker og Bærum Budstikke, is a daily local newspaper published out of Billingstad in Asker, Norway. It covers the municipalities of Asker and Bærum, and is the only newspaper issued in the area.

== History ==
The newspaper was founded in 1898 by book printer Jørgen Chr. Kanitz. Its political alignment was with the Conservative Party. Today it claims an "independent conservative" editorial orientation. It launched its internet edition in 2000, changed to tabloid format in 2002, and changed the name to Budstikka in 2004. Published out of Sandvika for most of its history, it moved to Billingstad in recent years.

It has a circulation of 28,258, of whom 27,791 are subscribers. It is published by the company Asker og Bærums Budstikke ASA, which is owned 31.5% by Edda Media.

== Editors ==
- 1898–1913: Jørgen Chr. Kanitz
- 1913–1915: Chr. Sangesland
- 1913–1917: Audun Hjermann
- 1917–1918: Anton B. Onstad
- 1918–1958: Johs. Løken
- 1958–1961: A. Arthur Herstrøm
- 1961–1991: Rolf Kluge
- 1991–2013: Andreas Gjølme
- 2013–2021: Kjersti Sortland
- 2022–present: Karianne Steinsland
