= Hans-Wilhelm Steinfeld =

Norwegian journalist

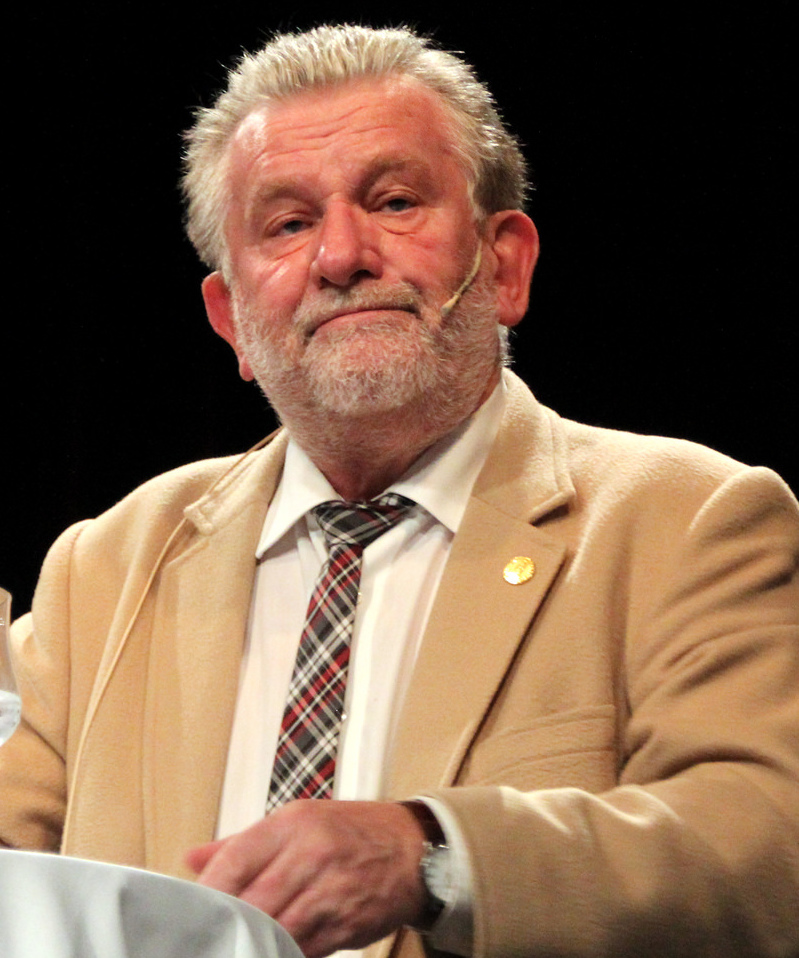
- Steinfeld in 2014
- Born: 29 March 1951 (age 75); Bergen, Norway
- Occupations: journalist, foreign correspondent and non-fiction writer.
- Employer: Norwegian Broadcasting Corporation
- Relatives: Dag Steinfeld (brother)
- Awards: Narvesen Prize (1990); Cappelen Prize (1990); Peer Gynt Prize (1991)

Hans-Wilhelm Steinfeld (born 29 March 1951) is a Norwegian journalist, foreign correspondent and non-fiction writer.

He has worked for the Norwegian Broadcasting Corporation (NRK) from 1976, and been a foreign correspondent for NRK in Moscow for four periods. He has written several books. He received the Narvesen Prize in 1990, the Cappelen Prize in 1990, and the Peer Gynt Prize in 1991.

Media offices
Preceded by Elnar Seljevold	Norwegian Broadcasting Corporation correspondent in Moscow; 1980–1984	Succeeded by Marit Christensen
Preceded by Marit Christensen	Norwegian Broadcasting Corporation correspondent in Moscow; 1988–1994 (joint with Jan Espen Kruse 1991–1994)	Succeeded by Gro Holm
Preceded by Morten Jentoft	Norwegian Broadcasting Corporation correspondent in Moscow; 2000–2003	Succeeded by Arne Egil Tønset
Preceded by Morten Ruud	Norwegian Broadcasting Corporation correspondent in Moscow; 2010–2014	Succeeded by Morten Jentoft
Awards
Preceded by Vigdis Hjorth	Recipient of the Cappelen Prize; 1990 (shared with Kjell Arild Pollestad)	Succeeded by Paal-Helge Haugen
