= Marit Christensen =

Norwegian journalist (1948–2022)

- Born: 11 November 1948
- Died: 30 September 2022 (aged 73)
- Occupation: Journalist
- Language: Norwegian
- Genre: Journalism

Marit Christensen (11 November 1948 – 30 September 2022) was a Norwegian journalist.

Christensen was a cand.mag. by education. She worked for the Norwegian Broadcasting Corporation between 1977 and 2002. Here, she was a journalist, correspondent in Moscow from 1984 to 1988, and presenter for the entertainment shows For galleriet (1992–1993) and Apropos (1998–1999). Her time in Moscow earned her the nickname "Moskva-Marit" ("Moscow Marit").

On 17 August 2013, Christensen disclosed that for the last year of Wenche Behring Breivik's life, the mother of Norwegian mass murderer Anders Behring Breivik, Christensen had been her confidant. The book was published in the autumn 2013, under the title "The Mother".

Media offices
Preceded by Hans-Wilhelm Steinfeld	Norwegian Broadcasting Corporation correspondent in Moscow; 1984–1988	Succeeded by Hans-Wilhelm Steinfeld
