= Yngve Slettholm =

Norwegian cultural executive and politician (born 1955)

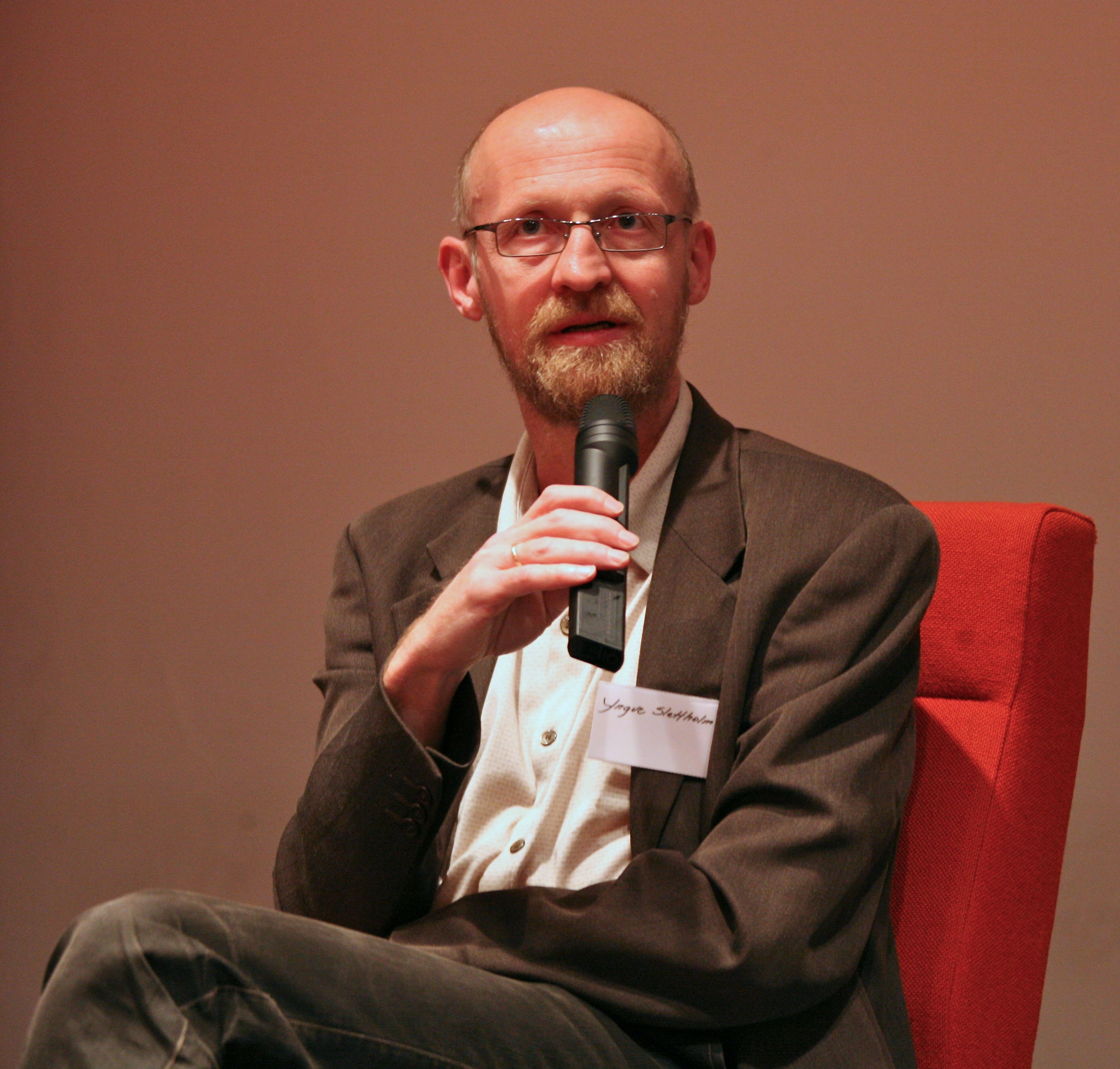
Yngve Slettholm

Yngve Slettholm (born 28 December 1955) is a Norwegian cultural executive, politician for the Christian Democratic Party and Salvationist.

== Early life and education ==
Slettholm attended the Norwegian Academy of Music from 1974 to 1980. He received his degree in music education in 1977 and completed his studies in composition under Finn Mortensen, receiving his diploma in composition in 1980. From 1986 to 1988, in the Fulbright Program, he studied at the State University of New York at Buffalo, with Morton Feldman as his teacher in composition. He received his PhD in composition in 1989.

== Composing career ==
Slettholm began his composing career in contemporary music in 1980. In the period 1982–1986, he was the President of the national organisation Ny Musikk (the Norwegian section of the International Society for Contemporary Music) until he traveled to the United States to continue his training. Slettholm has won many prizes for his work, as well as many study and work grants.

Slettholm has comprehensive teaching practice, running from instructor and conductor workshops in musical ensembles via school work as an associate professor in composing and music theory at the Norwegian Academy of Music, as well as prorector.

As well as his compositions in contemporary music, Slettholm has composed for choirs and brass bands in the Salvation Army.

== Politics and cultural executive ==
Slettholm's political career, where he represented the Christian Democratic Party, reached its high point when he was State Secretary in the Norwegian Ministry of Culture and Church Affairs under Valgerd Svarstad Haugland from 2001–2005. He has also been deputy leader of Oslo Christian Democratic Party.

Since 2006, Slettholm has been the executive director of the copyright management organisation Kopinor. From 2012–2016 he chaired the Arts Council of Norway. He is also chair of Dronning Sonja Internasjonale Musikkonkurranse. He has been chair of Composers' Remuneration Fund, vice chair of the Norwegian Society of Composers, TONO and the Ultima Oslo Contemporary Music Festival and board member of the Norwegian Music Fund.

== Works ==
=== Recorded and major works ===
- "Fire profiler" ("Four Profiles"), 1978 for saxophone
- "Magma", 1979 for piano
- "Introduksjon og toccata" ("Introduction and Toccata"), 1981 for saxophone and percussion
- "Sed spes est", 1982 for brass ensemble
- "Koralvariasajoner" (Choral Variations), 1982 for brass band
- "Lux", 1983 for flute
- "Agnus Dei", 1983 for choir
- "Six Pieces for Marimba", 1983
- "Is" ("Ice"), 1984 for children's/women's choir
- "Aggregations", 1984 for orchestra
- "Fem studier" ("Five Studies"), 1985 for ensemble
- "Hos Gud er evig glede", 1986 for ensemble
- "Katharsis", 1987 for two pianos and two vibraphones
- "Prismer" ("Prisms"), 1987 for clarinet and percussion quartet
- "Possible Selections", 1989 for flute and orchestra
- "Landscapes in Transformation", 1989 for piano
- "...wie ein Hauch...", 1989 for saxophone quartet
- "Beyond", 1990 for brass ensemble
- "Gull" ("Gold"), 1991 for female choir
- "Nature morte", 1991 for chamber ensemble
- "Air II", 1992 for percussion
- "Aura", 1994 for chamber ensemble
- "Circular Fragment", 1995 for orchestra
- "Déjà vu", 1998 for ensemble
- "Two Movements for Marimba", 1998
- "Ti bagateller for harpe" ("Ten Miniatures for Harp"), 2000
- "Ild" ("Fire"), 2001 for brass band
- "Blå skygge" ("Blue Shadow"), 2001 for soprano and harp
- "Shiranama", 2001 for reader, choir and chamber ensemble
- "Den store julefortellingen", 2002 to text by Emil Skartveit
- "Film", 2006 for piano and percussion
- "Det som en gang var" 2008 for soloists, children's choir and instrumental ensemble

=== Discography ===
- Mysterious Mountains Aurora 1989 (NCD 4923) with Elisabeth Klein
- Ensemble K4 live Albedo 1990 (ALBCD 001)
- Asheim/Slettholm Aurora 1993 (ACD 4967)
- Norwegian Signatures Aurora 1995 (ACD 4984) with BIT20 Ensemble, conductor Ingar Bergby
- Piano Aurora 1997 (ACD 5001) with Einar Henning Smebye
- Déjà vu Hemera Music 2000 (HCD 2937) with Nanset Ungdomsmusikkorps, conductor Odd Terje Lysebo
- Nocturnus Aurora 2003 (ACD 5022) with the Norwegian Soloist's Choir conductor Grete Pedersen.
- Possible Selections Aurora Records 2006 (ACD 5030) with the Oslo Philharmonic Orchestra, conductor Christian Eggen and soloists Tom Ottar Andreassen (flute) and Vegard Landaas (saxophone).
- Chamber music for saxophone and percussion Lawo Records 2010 (LWC 1017) with Vegard Landaas, Kjell Tore Innervik, Sidsel Walstad, NOxAS Saxophone Quartet
