= Jan Espen Kruse =

Norwegian journalist and correspondent (born 1956)

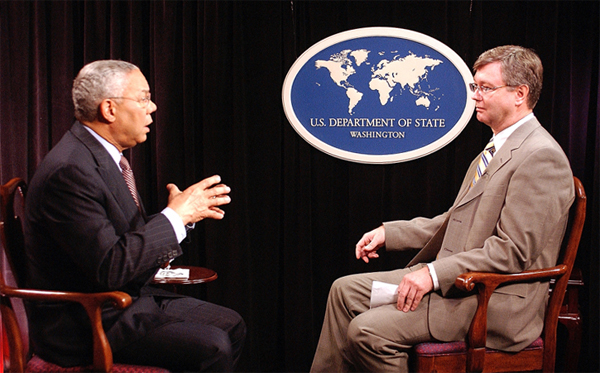
Colin Powell & Jan Espen Kruse

Jan Espen Kruse (born 9 July 1956) is a Norwegian journalist and correspondent.

He was born in Stavern. In 1990 he joined the Norwegian Broadcasting Corporation's foreign news desk, and from 1991 to 1996 he was their correspondent in Moscow. From 2003 to 2007 he held the same position in Washington, DC, and in 2018 he was hired for a new stint in Moscow. He also acts as an advisor and political commentator on all things concerning Russia and the Middle East.

== In private ==
Jan Espen Kruse has a wife named Julia Kruse and 4 kids: Christine Kruse, Birgitte Kruse, Camilla Kruse & Pavel Henry Kruse. They have on occasion appeared in Norwegian tabloids as well as Norwegian newspapers.

Media offices
Preceded by Hans-Wilhelm Steinfeld	Norwegian Broadcasting Corporation correspondent in Moscow; 1991–1996	Succeeded by Morten Jentoft; Gro Holm
Preceded by Wenke Eriksen	Norwegian Broadcasting Corporation correspondent in Washington, DC; 2003–2007	Succeeded by Annette Groth
Preceded by Morten Jentoft	Norwegian Broadcasting Corporation correspondent in Moscow; 2018–present	Succeeded by incumbent
