= Nettavisen =

Norwegian online newspaper

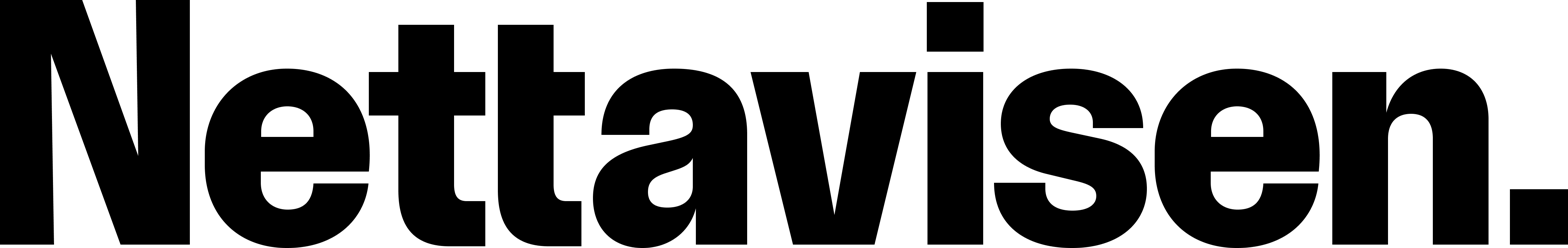
- Website type: Online newspaper
- Available in: Norwegian, Polish, Arabic, Russian, Somali
- Headquarters: Oslo
- Country of origin: Norway
- Owner: Amedia
- Editor: Alexandra Beverfjord
- Revenue: ▲171,3 million NOK (2021)
- Website: www.nettavisen.no
- Launched: 1996; 30 years ago
- ISSN: 0808-2049

Nettavisen is a Norwegian online newspaper, launched in 1996 as the first online-only newspaper in Norway. The current editor is Alexandra Beverfjord. As of 2015, it was one of Norway's most popular news websites.

== History ==
The online newspaper (its literal name in Norwegian) was launched on 1 November 1996, and was founded by Odd Harald Hauge, Stig Eide Sivertsen and Knut Ivar Skeid. In 1999 the newspaper was bought by Spray Sweden, which became part of Lycos Europe in 2000. In 2000 the founders of Nettavisen helped launch the (now-defunct) German sister site Netzeitung.

In 2002 Nettavisen was bought by Norway's largest commercial television channel TV 2. Due to millions of NOK in deficits and resulting major staff cuts, on 23 October 2008 the board of TV 2 decided to initiate negotiations with its owners, Egmont and Amedia, to sell the newspaper. From 2009 Nettavisen has been owned directly by Egmont and Amedia.

The newspaper has been part of the media company Mediehuset Nettavisen since 2008. In 2014 the media company posted record earnings with 39,7 per cent in annual income growth. By the 2010s Nettavisen turned deficits into major surpluses, making it in the unusual position in 2015 of being able to hire new staff with its new offices in traditional newspaper street Akersgata, when other newspapers continue to be under strong pressure despite millions in press support (of which Nettavisen receives none).

Nettavisen was as of 2015 the second most visited news website in Norway on mobile platforms, and one of the largest overall on digital platforms. It has a weekly readership of 2.6 million in the Norwegian market. According to Stavrum, Nettavisen is currently the only large national newspaper in Norway considered somewhat right-of-centre. Stavrum himself supports the Liberal Party. In 2017 the newspaper launched editions in Polish, Arabic, Russian and Somali. The same year, Amedia purchased full ownership of Nettavisen.
