= Anne Aasheim =

Norwegian editor

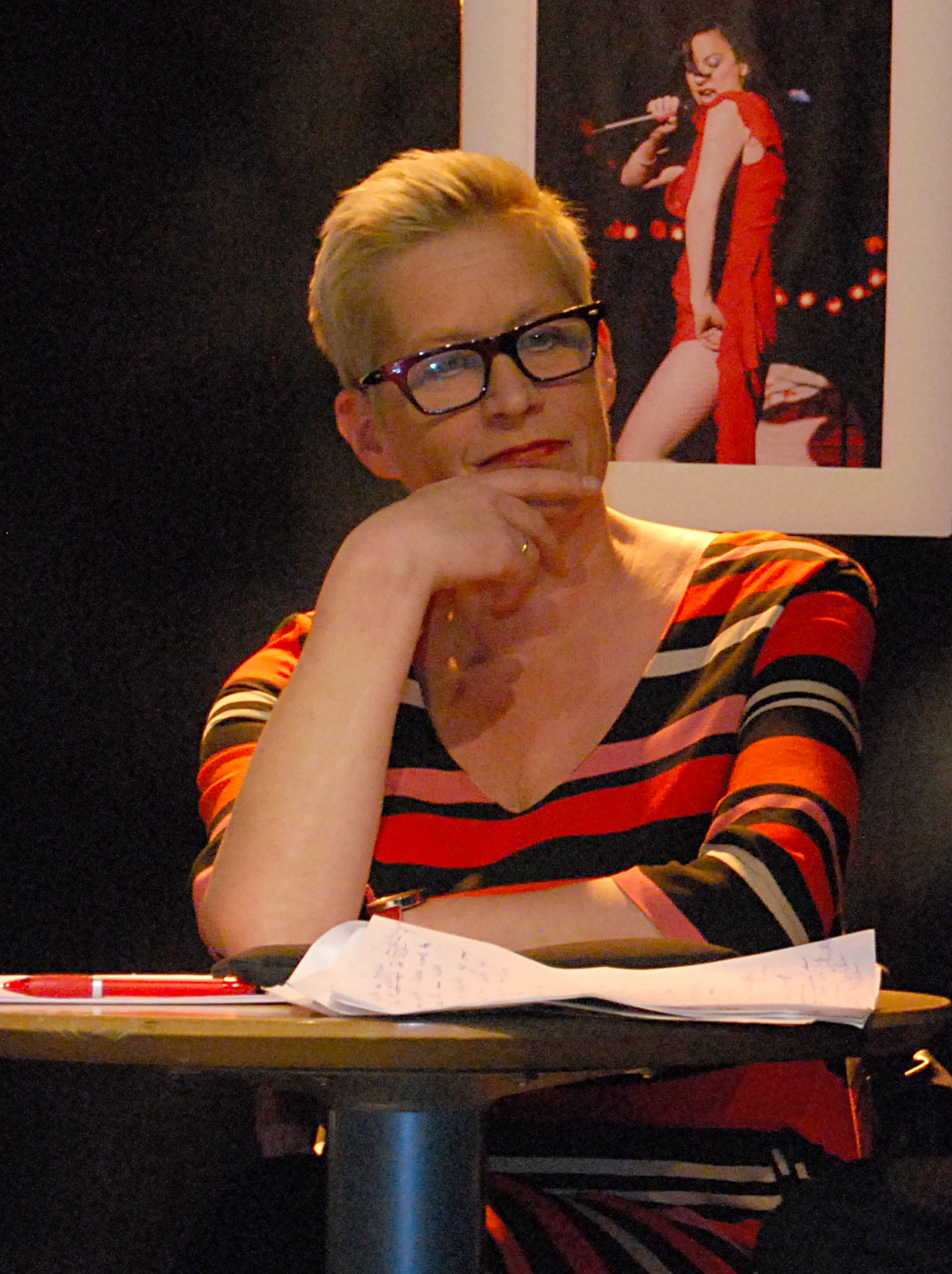
- Aasheim in 2012
- Born: 22 April 1962; Porsgrunn
- Died: 30 March 2016 (aged 53)
- Occupations: journalist, newspaper editor, cultural administrator

Anne Aasheim (22 April 1962 – 30 March 2016) was a Norwegian editor.

She was born in Porsgrunn and started her journalist career in the neighboring city's largest newspaper Varden in the late 1970s. She worked in Dagen and Bergens Arbeiderblad before being hired in NRK Hordaland in 1988.

She served as acting director of NRK P3 in Trondheim and NRK P2 in Oslo before being appointed as director of the local news post Østlandssendingen in 1997. In 1999 she served as acting director of culture in the news corporation, before serving as director of national and district news from 2001 to 2005. After a period as editor-in-chief of Dagbladet from 2006 to 2010, she resigned and became the new managing director of the Arts Council Norway in 2011.

She was married to researcher Mette Tollefsrud, resided in Ila, Oslo.

Aasheim died of lung cancer in Oslo in 2016.

Media offices
Preceded by Tom Berntzen	Director of national and district news, Norwegian Broadcasting Corporation; 2001–2005	Succeeded by Gro Holm
Preceded by Lars Helle (acting)	Chief editor of Dagbladet; 2006–2010	Succeeded by Lars Helle (acting)
Cultural offices
Preceded by Guri Skjeldal (acting)	Director of the Arts Council Norway; 2011–2016	Succeeded by Kristin Danielsen
