= Gro Holm =

Norwegian news editor and correspondent (born 1958)

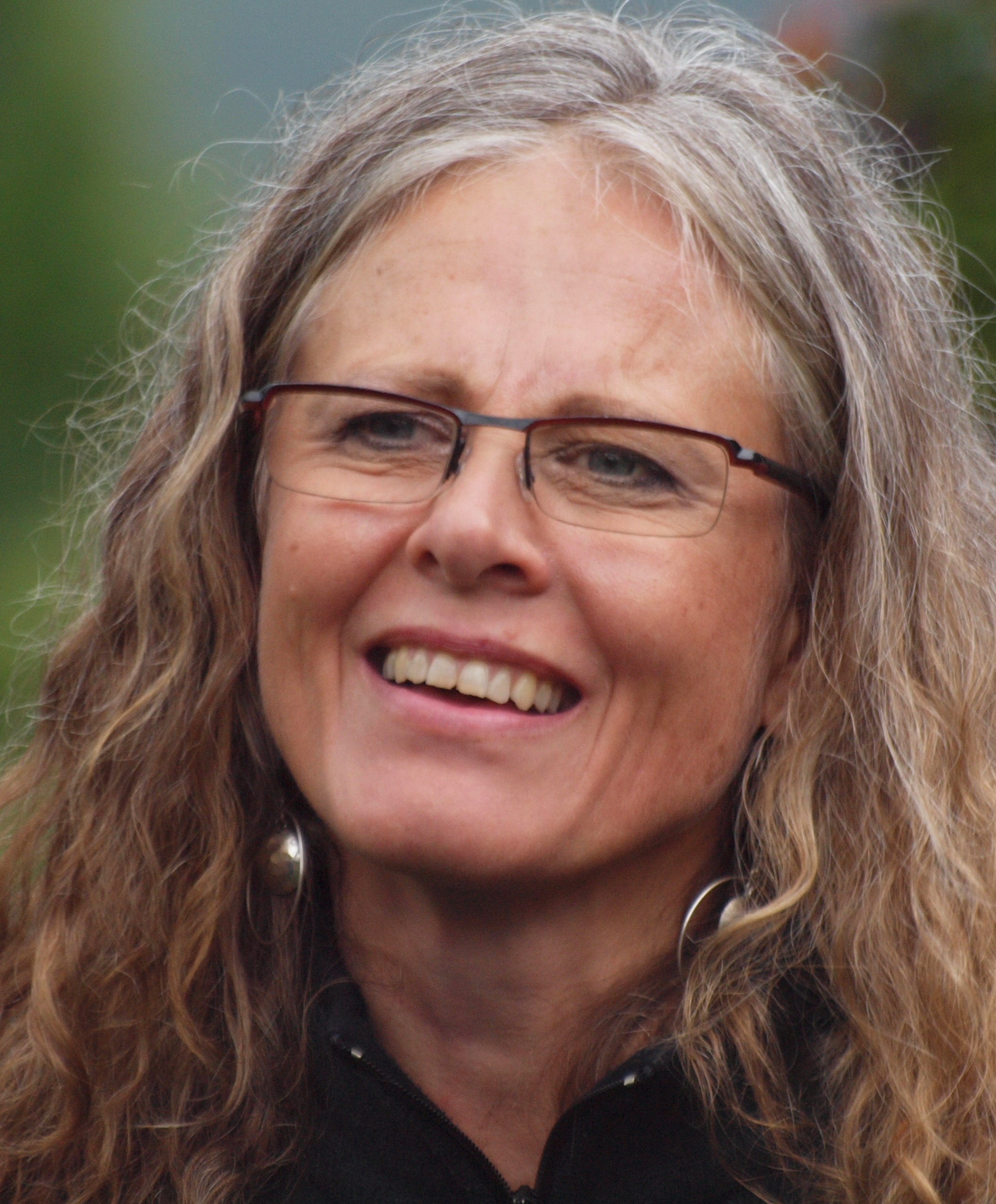
- Born: 11 April 1958 (age 67); Oslo
- Occupations: News editor and correspondent for Washington D.C. for NRK
- Spouse(s): Trond Nordby (formerly) [[Kai Eide 24 til 2019
- Children: 5 (total)

Gro Holm (born 11 April 1958) is a Norwegian news editor and correspondent.

She was hired in the Norwegian Broadcasting Corporation in 1982. From 1994 to 1998, she served as their Moscow correspondent. She was later foreign affairs editor of the news division before being appointed as director of national and district news in 2005. She was let go in September 2008 after disagreeing with the leadership on a proposed organizational model. In 2013, she was appointed as the Norwegian Broadcasting Corporation's correspondent in Washington, D.C.

She was married to professor of political history, Trond Nordby, before marrying high-ranking diplomat Kai Eide. She has three daughters from her first marriage; her current husband had two earlier. The couple reside in Lommedalen.

Media offices
Preceded by Hans-Wilhelm Steinfeld	Norwegian Broadcasting Corporation correspondent in Moscow; 1994–1998 (joint with Jan Espen Kruse 1994–1996, joint with Morten Jentoft 1996–1998)	Succeeded by Morten Jentoft
Preceded by Anne Aasheim	Director of national and district news, Norwegian Broadcasting Corporation; 2005–2008	Succeeded by
Preceded by Jon Gelius	Norwegian Broadcasting Corporation correspondent in Washington, DC; 2013–2017	Succeeded by Anders Magnus
