= Frode Hansen (editor) =

Norwegian newspaper editor

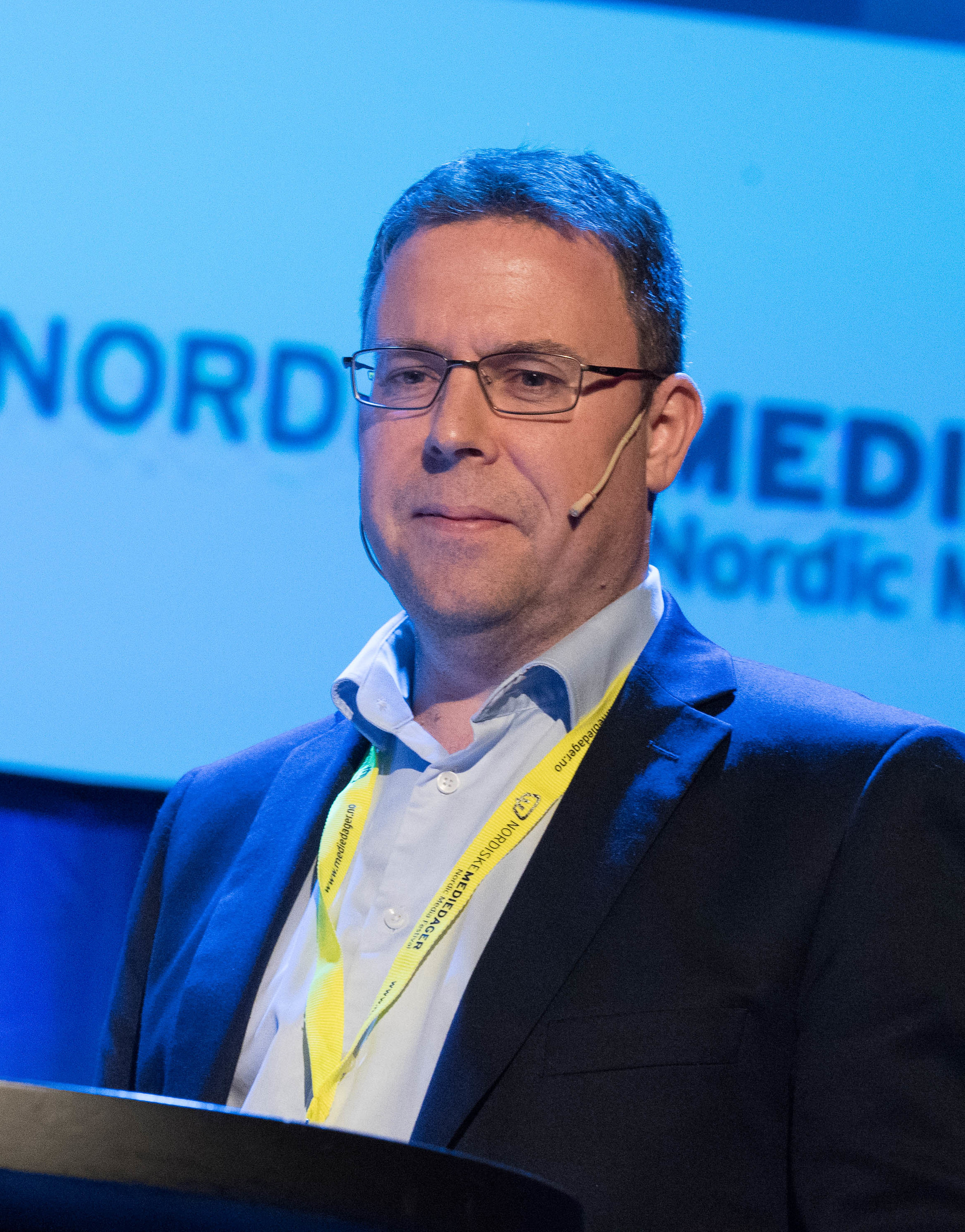
- Hansen in 2018
- Born: 24 January 1973 (age 53); Kirkenes, Norway
- Education: Høgskolen i Oslo
- Occupations: journalist and newspaper editor
- Employer: Dagbladet (Aller Media)

Frode Hansen (born 24 January 1973) is a Norwegian journalist and non-fiction writer. He was editor-in-chief of the newspaper Dagbladet from 2023 to 2025.

== Biography ==
Hansen was born in Kirkenes on 24 January 1973, and studied journalism at Høgskolen i Oslo from 1995 to 1997. He worked as journalist for the newspaper Sør-Varanger Avis from 1992 to 1995, and has worked for Dagbladet since 1995, first as crime reporter, then various positions. In 2005 he published the book Mette-Marit – i gode og onde dager.

In 2023 he was appointed editor-in-chief of Dagbladet, succeeding Alexandra Beverfjord. He resigned in September 2025.

Media offices
Preceded by Alexandra Beverfjord	Chief editor of Dagbladet; 2023-2025;	Succeeded by Martine Lunder Brenne and Mads A. Andersen (constituted)
