= Morten Jentoft =

Norwegian journalist

Morten Jentoft (born 22 July 1956) is a Norwegian journalist.

He was the Norwegian Broadcasting Corporation correspondent in Helsinki, Finland at the end of the Cold War. He made the first documentary ever aired on TV 2, titled "Olgas lange reise" together with Odd Isungset. After some time working foreign affairs in the radio's news division he was hired as the correspondent in Moscow, commencing in 1996. He left in 2000. He has authored several books, with themes revolving around Russia. He then had another stint as correspondent in Moscow from 2014 to 2018.

Select bibliography:

- Finland - vår utsatte nabo - nordmenn og finner i krig og fred (2025, Gyldendal)

Media offices
Preceded by Jan Espen Kruse	Norwegian Broadcasting Corporation correspondent in Moscow; 1996–2000 (joint with Gro Holm 1996–1998)	Succeeded by Hans-Wilhelm Steinfeld
Preceded by Hans-Wilhelm Steinfeld	Norwegian Broadcasting Corporation correspondent in Moscow; 2014–present	Succeeded by Jan Espen Kruse
