= Alexandra Beverfjord =

Norwegian journalist and writer (born 1977)

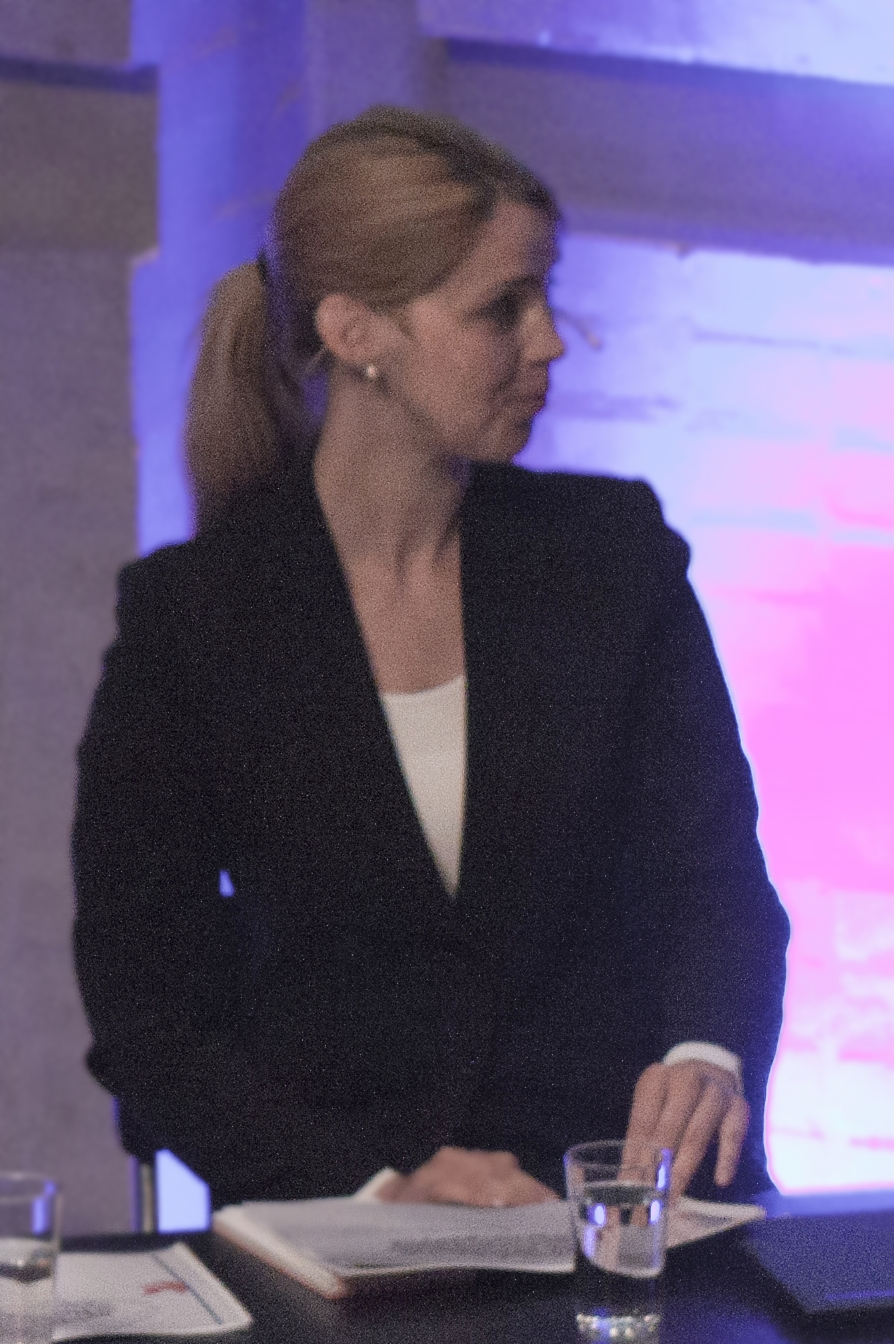
- Beverfjord in 2013
- Born: 2 June 1977 (age 49); Trondheim, Norway
- Education: Norwegian University of Science and Technology
- Occupations: journalist, crime fiction writer, newspaper editor, media executive
- Employer: Aller Media

Alexandra Beverfjord (born 2 June 1977) is a Norwegian journalist, crime fiction writer, newspaper editor and media executive. She was editor-in-chief of the newspaper Dagbladet from 2018 to 2023.

== Biography ==
Beverfjord was born in Trondheim on 2 June 1977, and was educated as social anthropologist from the Norwegian University of Science and Technology in 2002. She has been assigned with the newspapers Adresseavisen and Dagbladet, and with NRK. In 2018 she was appointed editor-in-chief of Dagbladet.

In 2023 Beverfjord was appointed as media executive in Aller Media, and Frode Hansen succeeded her as chief editor of Dagbladet. Berrefjord was executive in Aller Media from 2023 to 2025, and from 2025 she was executive in the media group Amedia. In 2026 she was appointed as responsible editor of the Amedia-owned online newspaper Nettavisen, while continuing her executive role in the owner company.

Her books include Det bor et barn i mitt hjerte (2009, jointly with Atle Dyregrov and Aida Løver), and the crime fiction novels Kretsen (2010) and Kronprinsem (2012).

Media offices
Preceded by John Arne Markussen	Chief editor of Dagbladet; 2018–2023	Succeeded by Frode Hansen
