= Blink (disambiguation) =

A blink is a rapid eyelid closure.

Blink may also refer to:

== Arts and entertainment ==
=== Film ===
- Blink (1993 film), a neo-noir thriller following a blind witness
- Blink (2022 film), a horror short following a paralysed woman
- Blink (2024 American film), a documentary about genetic blindness
- Blink (2024 Indian film), an Indian time-travel thriller
- Blink, a 2009 short starring Ben Foster

=== Literature ===
- Blink: The Power of Thinking Without Thinking, a 2005 popular psychology text by Malcolm Gladwell
- Blink (character), a 1994 Marvel Comics superheroine
- Blink (novel), a 2003 work of Christian fiction by Ted Dekker

=== Music ===
==== Bands ====
- Blink (band), an Irish band formed 1991
- Blink. (American band), an American jazz fusion group formed 2006
- Blink-182, an American pop-punk band formed 1992
- Blink, name of the fandom club of South Korean girl group Blackpink

==== Albums ====
- Blink (Plumb album), 2007, or its title song
- Blink (Revive album), 2010, or its title song

==== Songs ====
- "Blink" (Rosie Ribbons song), 2002
- "Blink" (U.V.U.K. song), 2012
- "Blink", a song on Bad Gyal 2018 album Worldwide Angel
- "Blink", a song by Boom Boom Satellites
- "Blink", a song by Meghan Trainor from Treat Myself
- "Blink", a song by Moloko from I Am Not a Doctor
- "Blink", a song by Oh My Girl from Real Love
- "Blink", a song by Corbyn Besson & Tzuyu
- "Blink" (またたき), a song by mothy

=== Television episodes ===
- "Blink" (CSI: NY)
- "Blink" (Doctor Who)
- "Blink" (Eureka)
- "Blink" (Law & Order: Criminal Intent)
- "Blink" (The 4400 episode)

=== Other media ===
- WNEW-FM or Blink 102.7, a New York City radio station during 2003
- Blink, a young adult imprint of HarperCollins

== Businesses ==
- Blink (airline), United Kingdom (2007–2008)
- Blink Home, a home automation company (founded 2009)
- Blink Fitness, part of Equinox Group (2011–2024)

== Computing ==
- Blink (browser engine), web browser engine of Chrome since 2014
- Blink (SIP client), VoIP software (initial release: 2009)
- Blink element (<blink>), a non-standard HTML tag
- Blink (community), a Norwegian online forum (2002–2011)

== Other uses ==
- Charles Roberts (Canadian football) (born 1979), nicknamed Blink

== See also ==
- Quantum dot blinking, or fluorescence intermittency
