= John Arne Markussen =

Norwegian journalist and newspaper editor

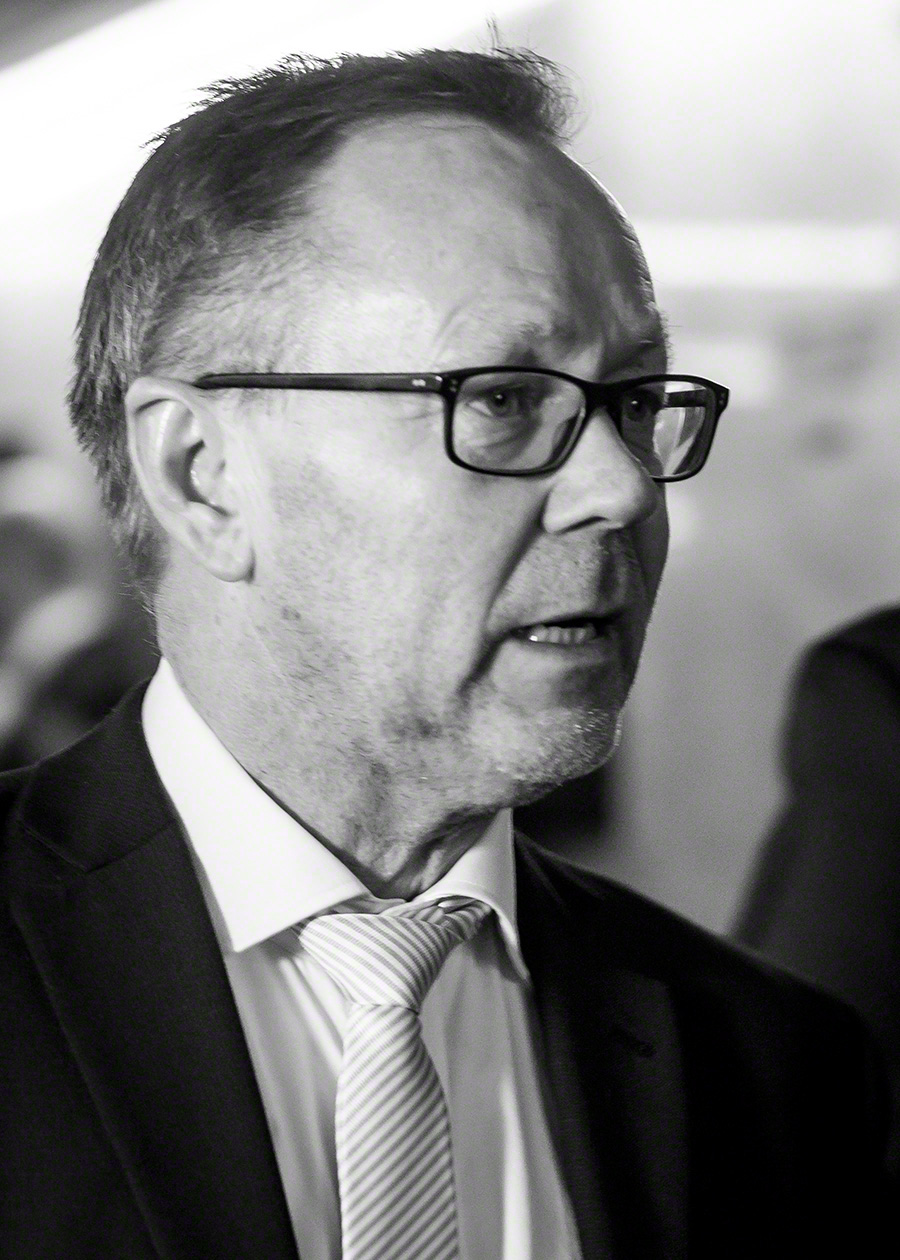
- Markussen in 2016
- Born: 20 May 1953 (age 72); Repvåg, Norway
- Occupations: journalist and newspaper editor

John Arne Markussen (born 20 May 1953) is a Norwegian journalist and newspaper editor. He was chief editor of the newspaper Dagbladet from 2011 to 2018.

== Career ==
Markussen was born on 20 May 1953 in Repvåg in Nordkapp Municipality, Norway. He was journalist for the newspaper Altaposten from 1971 to 1976, and for Dagbladet from 1977. In 2011 he was appointed chief editor of Dagbladet, succeeding Lars Helle. In 2018 Alexandra Beverfjord succeeded him as chief editor of Dagbladet. He was media executive of Aller Media from 2018 to 2019.

Among his books are Norske redaktører - voktere av enigheten from 1979, and Frihet og frykt - nærbilder av USA from 1996.

Media offices
Preceded by Lars Helle	Chief editor of Dagbladet; 2011–2018	Succeeded by Alexandra Beverfjord
