= Paal-Helge Haugen =

Norwegian poet, novelist, dramatist and children's writer

- Born: 26 April 1945 (age 81); Valle, Norway
- Occupations: Poet, novelist, playwright and children's writer
- Awards: Gyldendal's Endowment (1985); Nynorsk Literature Prize (1985); Dobloug Prize (1987); Norwegian Critics Prize for Literature (1990); Cappelen Prize (1991); Brage Prize (1992); Aschehoug Prize (2008); Order of St. Olav (2009)

Paal-Helge Haugen (born 26 April 1945) is a Norwegian poet, novelist, dramatist and children's writer who has published over 30 books. His titles have been translated into at least 20 languages. His 1968 "punktroman" or "pointillist novel," Anne, was the first in its genre and was soon considered a modern classic. In 2019, Hanging Loose Press published the first English translation of Anne], after Julia Johanne Tolo's translation of the book won the sixth annual Loose Translations Prize, jointly sponsored by Hanging Loose Press and the graduate writing program of Queens College, City University of New York.

== Career ==
Haugen was born in Valle Municipality, Setesdal, and studied medicine at the University of Oslo. He made his literary debut with Blad frå ein austleg hage in 1965, a translation of Japanese haiku.

He has collaborated with numerous artists (Kjell Nupen, Grete Nash, Olaf Chr. Jensen, Jens Johannesen, Jan Groth, and others) and both Norwegian and international composers (Iannis Xenakis, Atli Heimir Sveinsson, Kjell Habbestad, Bjørn Kruse, Arne Nordheim, Lillebjørn Nilsen and others).

He received the Dobloug Prize in 1987, and was awarded the Norwegian Critics Prize for Literature in 1990. He received the Brage Prize in 1994 for Sone 0. Haugen was nominated for the Nordic Council's Literature Prize in 1991 for Meditasjonar over Georges de La Tour.

In January 2009 King Harald V of Norway made Haugen a Knight, First Class of the Royal Norwegian Order of St. Olav, awarding him for his work for Norwegian literature and culture.

== Awards ==
- Gyldendal's Endowment 1985
- Nynorsk Literature Prize 1985
- Dobloug Prize 1987
- Norwegian Critics Prize for Literature 1990
- Cappelen Prize 1991
- Brage Prize 1992
- Aschehoug Prize 2008
- Royal Norwegian Order of St. Olav 2009

Awards
Preceded by Hans Wilhelm Steinfeld, Kjell Arild Pollestad	Recipient of the Cappelen Prize; 1991	Succeeded by Axel Jensen
