= Dag Steinfeld =

Norwegian barrister (born 1955)

- Born: 14 March 1955 (age 71)
- Education: University of Bergen
- Occupation: barrister
- Employer: Wikborg Rein
- Relatives: Hans-Wilhelm Steinfeld (brother)

Dag Steinfeld (born 14 March 1955) is a Norwegian barrister.

He graduated as cand.jur. from the University of Bergen in 1981, and was admitted to the Supreme Court from 1988. Since 1990 he has been partner in the law company Wikborg Rein, based in Bergen. Steinfeld is known from several cases of significant public interest, such as the fraud case against rear admiral Atle Torbjørn Karlsvik, and a case involving the shipping company Westfal-Larsen.

Steinfeld is a brother of Hans-Wilhelm Steinfeld.
