= Trond Nordby =

Norwegian historian and political scientist

- Born: 6 July 1943 (age 82); Norway
- Occupations: Historian and political scientist
- Spouse: Gro Holm (formerly)

Trond Nordby (born 6 July 1943) is a Norwegian historian and political scientist.

He graduated candidatus philologiæ in 1972, and received his PhD in 1984. He worked as a research fellow and lecturer of history at the University of Oslo from 1975 to 1986. From 1985 to 1989 he was a researcher for NAVF, and from 1990 he worked at the Norwegian Institute for Social Research. He is now a professor in the Department of Political Science, University of Oslo, having been promoted in 1995.

His research has centered on several issues. His background with health history shows in the 1989 biography of Karl Evang and his 1993 book chapter Det offentlige helsevesenet - en fagstyrets høyborg, about the technocracy in health management in Norway. The book I politikkens sentrum. Variasjoner i Stortingets makt 1814-2004 (second edition 2004) focuses on the Norwegian Parliament and Constitution. He has also synthesized social and political history, among others in the book Det moderne gjenombruddet i bondesamfunnet. Norge 1870-1920.
