= Tom Hetland =

Norwegian journalist and editor (born 1954)

Tom Magnar Hetland (born 10 July 1954 in Sandnes) is a Norwegian journalist and editor.

He majored in history at the University of Bergen, with minors in Norwegian and Russian. While studying he was editor in Norsk Tidend. He also worked as a journalist in various minor newspapers.

He was hired as a journalist Stavanger Aftenblad in 1986 and became political editor in 1998. In 2002 he was appointed acting chief editor; the position was made permanent in 2003.

Hetland was chief editor of Stavanger Aftenblad from 2002 to 2011, and was succeeded by Lars Helle.

Preceded by Jens Barland	Chief editor of Stavanger Aftenblad; 2002–2011	Succeeded by Lars Helle
