= Ingeborg Lyche =

Norwegian civil servant (1910–1990)

Ingeborg Lyche (7 August 1910 – 7 January 1990) was a Norwegian civil servant, born in Østre Toten Municipality, Norway. She was the first manager of Arts Council Norway, from 1966 to 1977. She was decorated Knight, First Class of the Order of St. Olav in 1977, and Commander of the Order of the Lion of Finland.
