= Kjell Arild Pollestad =

Norwegian Catholic author, translator and theologian

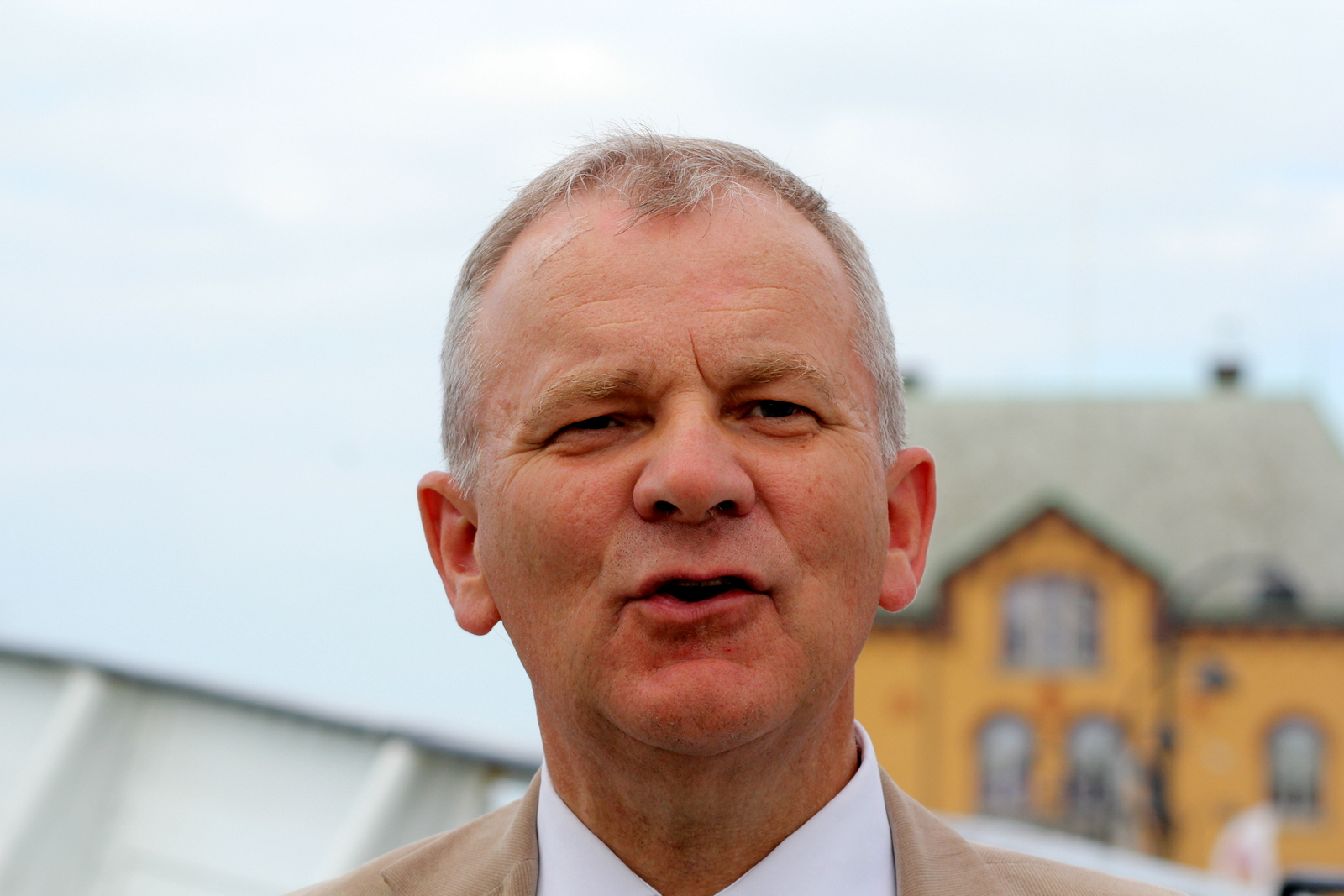
Kjell Arild Pollestad

Kjell Arild Pollestad, OP (born 27 May 1949 in Hå, Jæren) is a Norwegian Catholic author, translator, theologian, philologist, and Dominican priest.

Pollestad studied Russian language and Lutheran theology at the University of Oslo, graduating as cand. theol. in 1977. He graduated in Catholic theology at the Institut Catholique de Toulouse in 1979, and studied ancient Oriental languages (Syriac and Coptic) at the Pontifical Biblical Institute in Rome from 1979 to 1981. He is fluent in a large number of languages. Converting to Catholicism and joining the Dominican Order in 1975, he was ordained a Catholic priest by Bishop John Willem Gran on 12 April 1980. He was head of the press office of the Catholic Church in Norway 1981–1988, and parish priest in Tønsberg 1988–1996. He has lived in the monastery of St. Jacques in Paris since 2005.

Pollestad has been a popular and award-winning author since the 1980s. He has published several books and essays, and has translated a collection of poems by Constantine P. Cavafy in 2002. He won the Cappelen Prize (jointly with Hans-Wilhelm Steinfeld) in 1990. He is also a member of the Norwegian Academy for Language and Literature. Pollestad is an outspoken liberal who has been one of Norway's best known Catholics for many years, frequently appearing as a commentator on Catholic issues in national media. He was one of three presenters of the Norwegian Broadcasting Corporation documentary series Tre muntre herrer i Roma (Three Cheerful Gentlemen in Rome), that was aired in 2007.

Within the Catholic Church itself, he has been controversial due to his perceived liberal stance notably on homosexuality, with several priests signing a protest petition against him when he published the Cavafy collection that included some of Cavafy's homoerotic poems. In an op-ed in Aftenposten, he announced his intention to resign as a Catholic priest in 2010, but eventually changed his mind.

== Publications ==
- Lofottorsk på nonnebord, essays (1984)
- Min Islandsferd (1986)
- Skål for Norge (1987)
- 17. mai i Samarkand (1988)
- Paven i Rom (1989)
- Veien til Rom – hvordan jeg ble katolikk (1990)
- Maten er halve føda (1991)
- Humørpiller. Muntre epistler i utvalg (1992)
- Pater Hilarion (1993)
- Parabol (1996)
- Therese (1997)
- Veier overalt (1998)
- Livet er bedre enn sitt rykte (1999)
- Kirkeliv i nord før Svartedauden (2001)
- Constantine P. Cavafy: Siden jeg ikke kan tale om min kjærlighet (2002)
- Gleden er gratis (2002)
- Samtaler med Horats – Dagbok 2000–2004 (2004)
- Peters svar : kristendom for dannede hedninger og lunkne kristne (2007)
- På feil klode? - Dagbok 2004-2008 (2008)

Awards
Preceded by Vigdis Hjorth	Recipient of the Cappelen Prize (jointly with Hans-Wilhelm Steinfeld); 1990	Succeeded by Paal-Helge Haugen
