= Per Hovdenakk =

Norwegian art historian

- Born: 11 December 1935; Ørsta, Norway
- Died: 14 June 2016 (aged 80)
- Occupation: Art historian

Per Hovdenakk (11 December 1935 – 14 June 2016) was a Norwegian art historian.

He was born in Ørsta in Møre og Romsdal county, Norway. From 1959 to 1969 he was a journalist at Bergens Arbeiderblad. He was assigned with the Henie Onstad Kunstsenter from 1969, and served as director of the museum from 1989 to 1996. He was decorated Knight of the Order of St. Olav in 2012.
