= Blink (community) =

Online community in Norway

Blink was one of the earliest and largest online communities in Norway, which operated from 2002 to 2011. Launched by the media lab of the national daily newspaper Dagbladet, at its peak, it had 300,000 users.

The community was finally closed down at the end of 2011, due to a mass flight of users to competitors like Facebook. After this flight, the 4,000 active members were not enough for the community to remain viable and it was therefore closed down.
