= Kristin Danielsen (dancer) =

Norwegian dancer, choreographer, cultural administrator (born 1972)

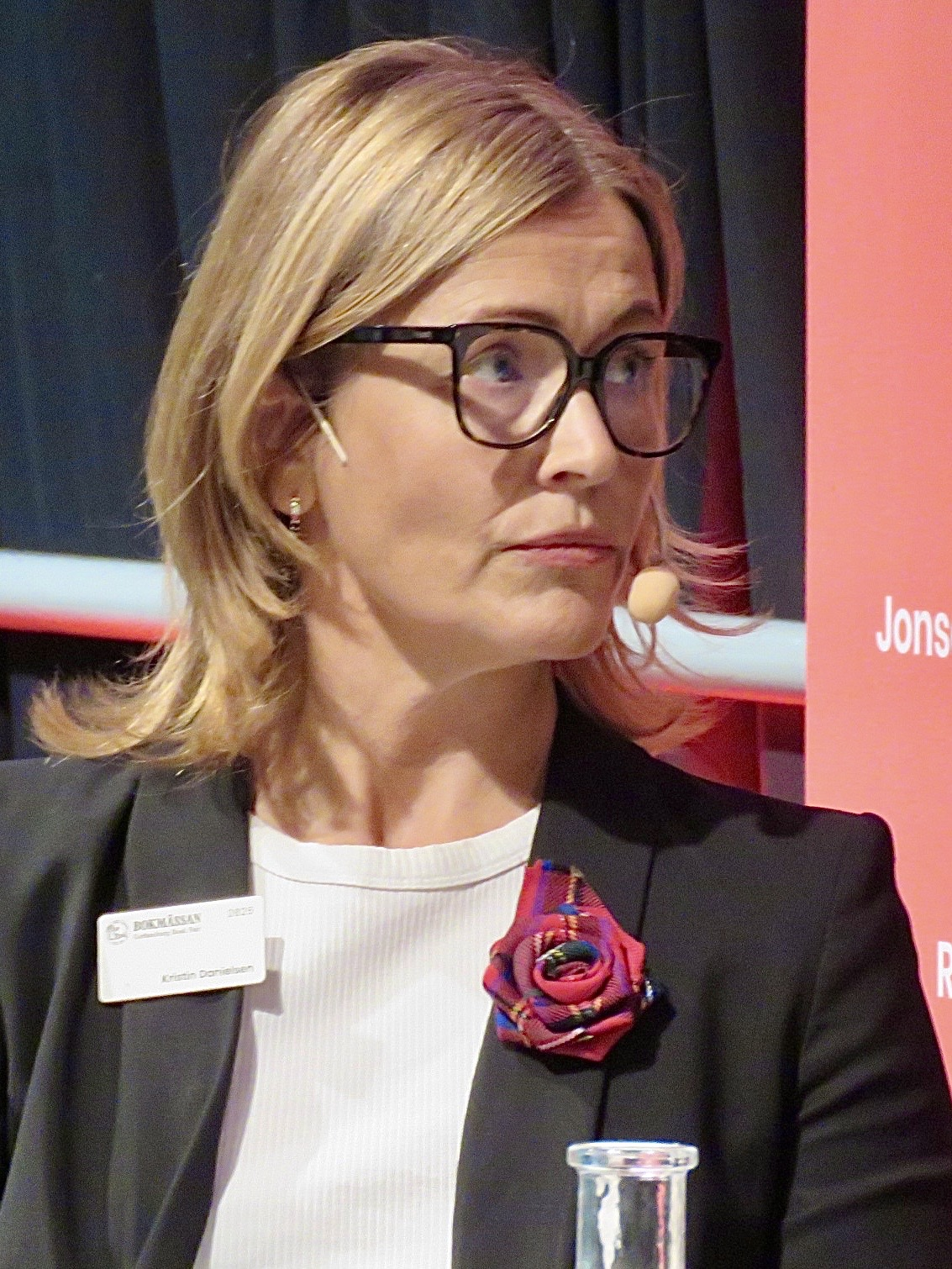
- at the Gothenburg Book Fair 2025.
- Born: 1972 (age 53–54); Arendal, Norway
- Education: City, University of London
- Occupations: dancer, choreographer and cultural administrator

Kristin Danielsen (born 1972) is a Norwegian dancer, choreographer and cultural administrator.

She was born in Arendal. She was trained as dancer at Den norske balletthøgskole in Oslo and the Broadway Dance Centre in New York City, and graduated as Master of Arts Management from the City, University of London. After a career as dancer and choreographer, she assumed various administrative positions. From 1999 to 2001 she was manager of the Black Box Teater in Oslo, and she was producer at the Danse- og teatersentrum from 2001 to 2002. She further held administrative positions at Ny Musikk (2006–2010), Det Norske Teatret (2010–2011), MIC Norsk musikkinformasjon (2011–2013), and Oslo Public Library (2014–2016). She was appointed Director of the Arts Council Norway in 2016.

Cultural offices
Preceded by Anne Aasheim	Director of the Arts Council Norway; 2016–	Incumbent
