= Henie Onstad Kunstsenter =

Art museum in Norway

Coordinates: 59°53′19.59″N 10°33′10.56″E

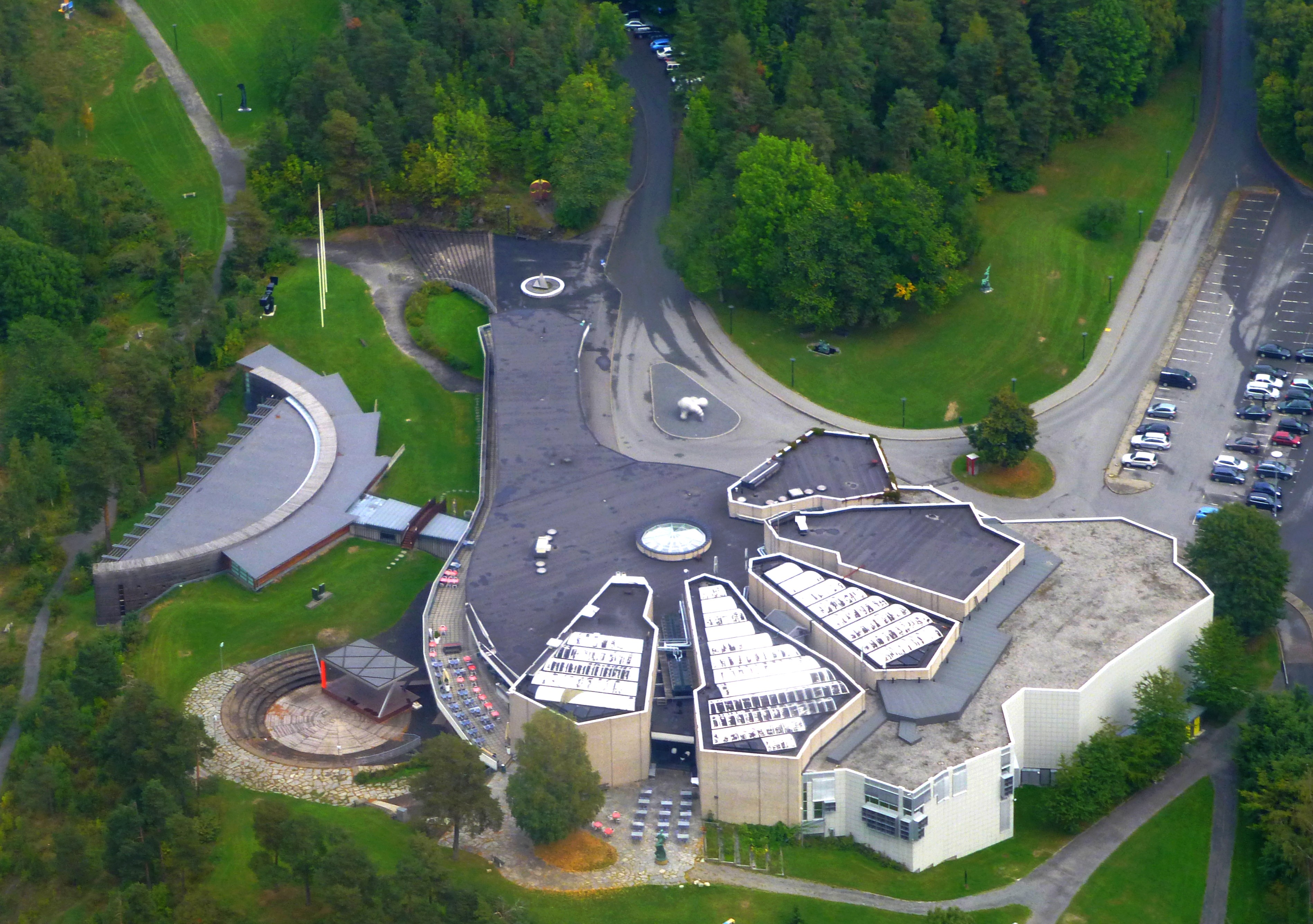
Henie Onstad Kunstsenter

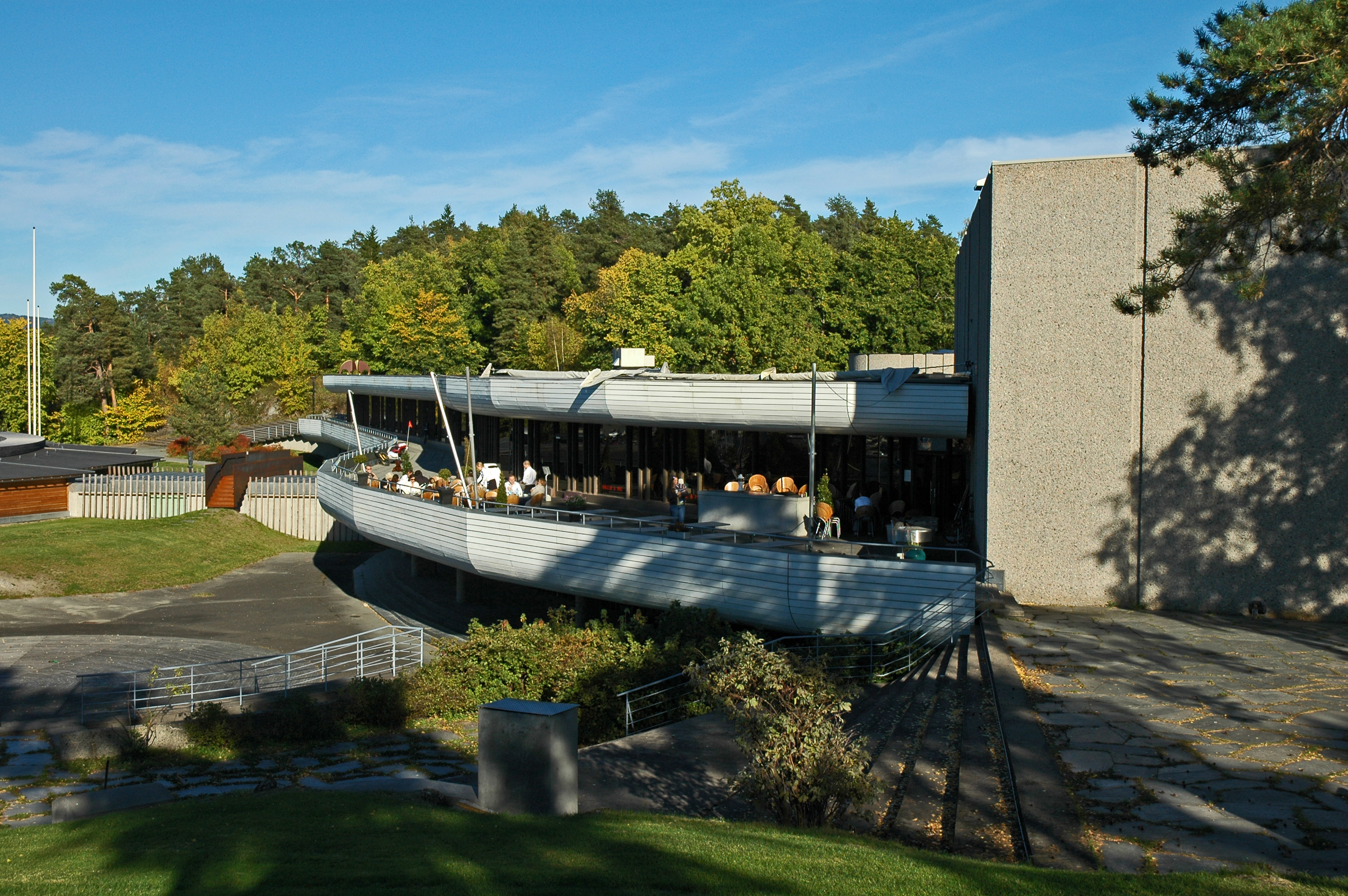
Henie Onstad Kunstsenter

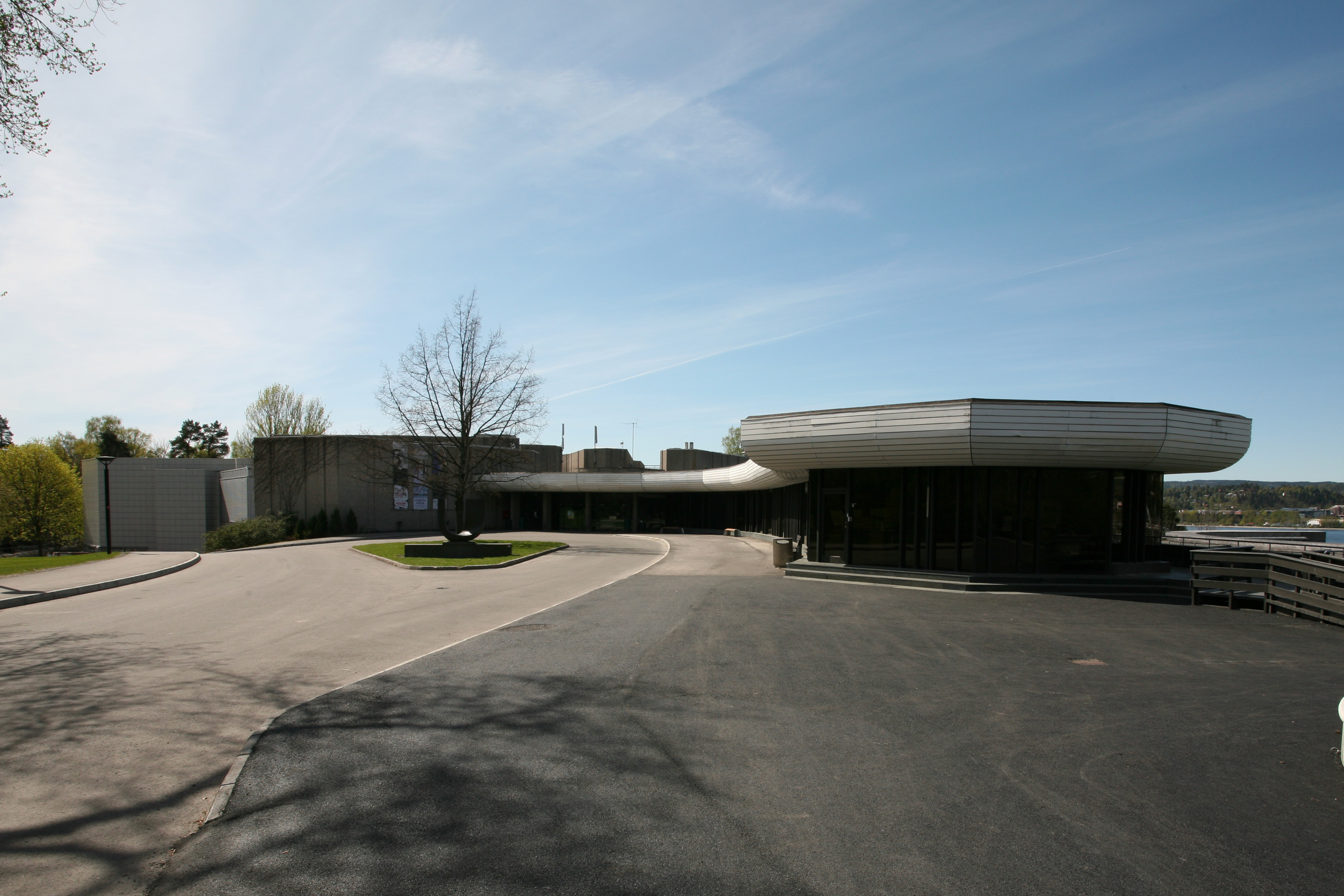
Henie Onstad Kunstsenter

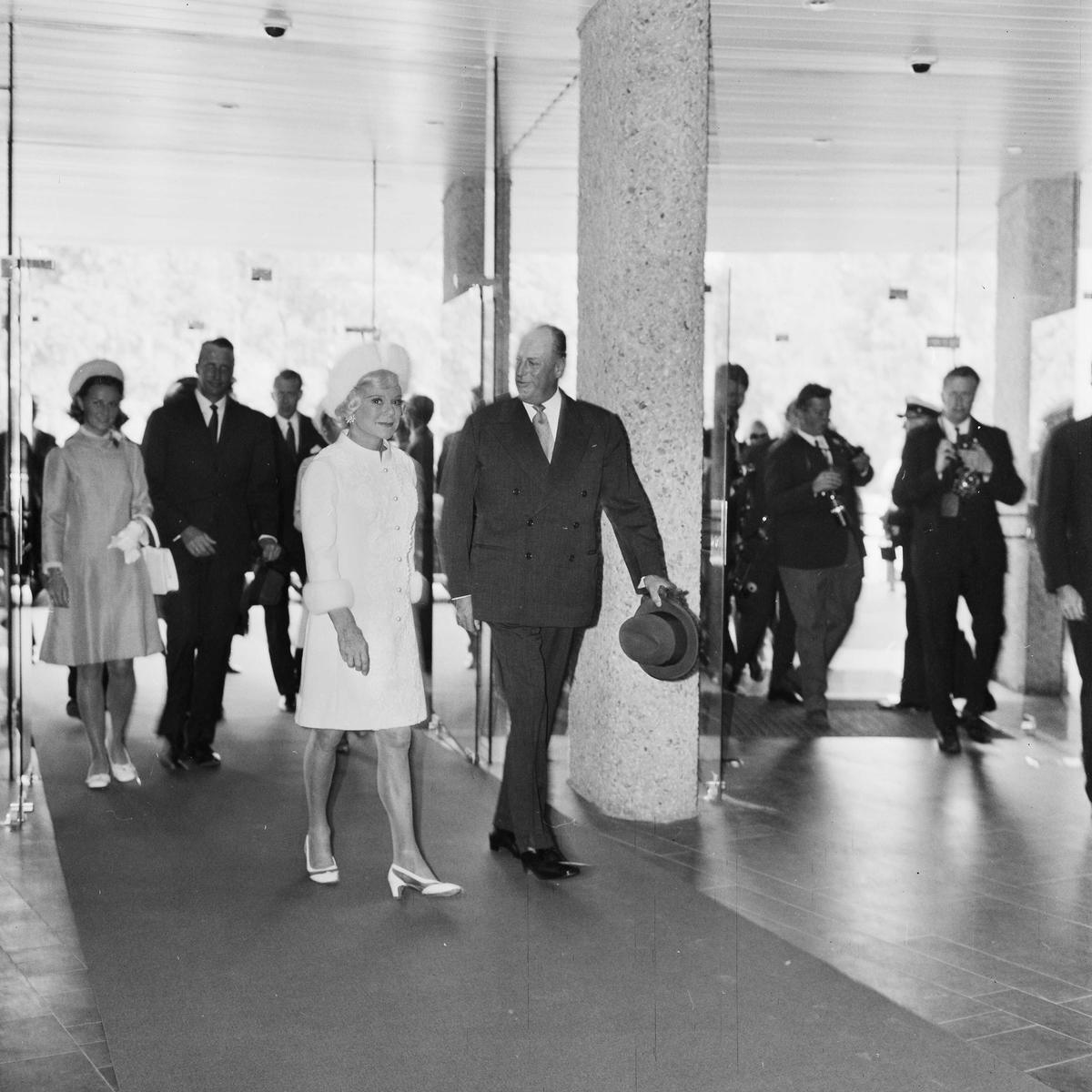
Sonja Henie and King Olav V of Norway enter the Henie Onstad Kunstsenter during the opening, followed by Crown Princess Sonja and Niels Onstad.

The Henie Onstad Kunstsenter is an art museum located at Høvikodden in Bærum municipality in Akershus county, Norway. It is situated on a headland jutting into the Oslofjord, approximately 10 kilometres (6.2 mi) southwest of Oslo.

The art center was founded in 1968 by World and Olympic champion figure skater Sonja Henie (1912–1969) and her husband, shipping magnate and art collector Niels Onstad (1909–1978). Their private collection of contemporary art, total 110 images, as well as funds for construction and operation of the centre was donated by the couple in 1961, when the Sonja Henie and Niels Onstad Foundation was created. The centre was designed by Norwegian architects Jon Eikvar and Sven Erik Engebretsen. Today, the collection consists of more than 8,000 works.

== Exhibitions and programs ==
Henie Onstad Kunstsenter is a venue for modern and contemporary art, presenting national and international visual art with a broad program of exhibitions, concerts, dance, and performance. The centre typically presents between four and six temporary exhibitions each year, in addition to its three permanent exhibitions.

=== Hymn of Life ===
Hymn of Life is a mirror-based installation by Yayoi Kusama that visitors can enter. The work consists of mirrors on the walls and floor, along with pulsating lights that change color. The installation was produced for Kusama’s exhibition at Henie Onstad Kunstsenter in 2016. It was inaugurated on 23 August 2018 in connection with the museum’s 50th anniversary and is part of the permanent collection.

=== Sal Merz ===
Sal Merz opened in 2021 and is dedicated to the German avant-garde artist Kurt Schwitters and his contemporaries and successors. The permanent exhibition Merz! Flux! Pop! presents works drawn from Henie Onstad Kunstsenter’s own collections and archives, including Fluxus works and the Jean Brown Personal Papers.

=== Sonja Henie Prize Collection ===
In 2021, Henie Onstad Kunstsenter opened a new installation of Sonja Henie’s prize collection in a renovated room. The exhibition presents Henie’s career as a figure skater and film actress, from her Olympic debut in 1924 to international championships and Hollywood film roles.

=== Sculpture Park ===
The art centre is surrounded by a sculpture park containing 30 sculptures. The donors, Sonja Henie and Niels Onstad, are buried on the premises.

=== Notable events ===
The centre celebrated its 40th anniversary in 2008 with exhibitions, seminars, book, concert and movie titled Høvikodden LIVE.

In 2019 the Henie Onstad Kunstsenter hosted the first FIDE World Fischer Random Chess Championship.

== Building and architecture ==
In 1964, Sonja Henie and Niels Onstad announced an architectural competition for the art center. The competition was won by the Norwegian architects Jon Eikvar and Svein-Erik Engebretsen, and the project was their first architectural commission. The art center was completed in 1968 and was designed to adapt to the landscape along the Oslo Fjord. The architecture uses materials such as glass, stone, natural concrete, and copper.

In 1994, the building was extended, and a two-story wing with exhibition spaces and technical rooms was added. This project was designed by the same architects—the new wing abuts the main body of the building as an organic extension. In 2003, another extension was made, this time in the form of an annex that extends into the outdoor park, connected to the main building by a passage leading from the lower level. In addition to six exhibition halls, the Centre also has an auditorium and smaller meeting rooms. Today, the total building area is approximately 9,500 square meters, of which 3,500 are occupied by exhibition spaces.

=== Workshop ===
In 2026, Henie Onstad Kunstsenter plans to open a new workshop facility dedicated to creative activity and educational programs, through the redevelopment of parts of its premises at Høvikodden. Sal Haaken was donated by Haaken A. Christensen in 2003. The building is planned to be redeveloped and opened towards the waterfront with a new terrace, and will be used for workshop activities. In the main building, plans include the establishment of a permanent gallery for the collection, located in the area currently occupied by the Lab.

The project is fully funded through support from Sparebankstiftelsen DNB, Bærum municipality, Akershus County Municipality, and the State budget of Norway. The workshop is estimated to open in the summer of 2026.

== Controversy ==
After being identified in an exhibition catalogue in 2012 by the family of noted French-Jewish art dealer Paul Rosenberg, it was demanded that the HOK return Profil bleu devant la cheminée (Woman in Blue in Front of Fireplace) (1937), a Matisse painting that was confiscated by the Nazis in 1941. Museum Director Tone Hansen said the museum did not know the painting was stolen by the Nazis, until it was notified by the Rosenberg family.

Rosenberg had bought the painting direct from Matisse in 1937, and had it stored at the time of the 1940 Nazi invasion of France in a bank vault in Libourne, a commune in the Gironde department in Aquitaine, southwestern France. The Einsatzstab Reichsleiter Rosenberg entered the vault in March 1941 to confiscate the art pieces, and after cataloging at Galerie nationale du Jeu de Paume in September 1941, it was designated to the private collection of Hermann Göring. Then via various dealers during the Nazi period, post-war in the late 1940s it was bought by Niels Onstad from the Paris-based dealer Henri Bénézit. It has since appeared in numerous publications, and toured the world on several occasions. Although under Norwegian law, due to the period of ownership the painting now belongs to HOK, Norway was one of 44 signatories to the 1998 Washington Conference Principles on Nazi-Confiscated Art. Protracted mediation, overseen by Christopher A. Marinello, saw the painting returned to the heirs of Paul Rosenberg in March 2014.

As a result, the Henie Onstad Kunstsenter launched a Provenance Project.

== Directors ==
- 2023– : Anne Hilde Neset
- 2011–22: Tone Hansen
- 2004–11: Karin Hellandsjø
- 2003–04: Jan Feldborg
- 1998–2003: Gavin Jantjes
- 1989–96: Per Hovdenakk
- 1966–89: Ole Henrik Moe

== Other sources ==
- Hellandsjø, Karin The Henie Onstad Art Centre: The Art of Tomorrow Today : The Collection (Torino: Skira, 2008)
