= Høvikodden =

Headland in Bærum, Norway

Coordinates: 59°53′16″N 10°33′12″E

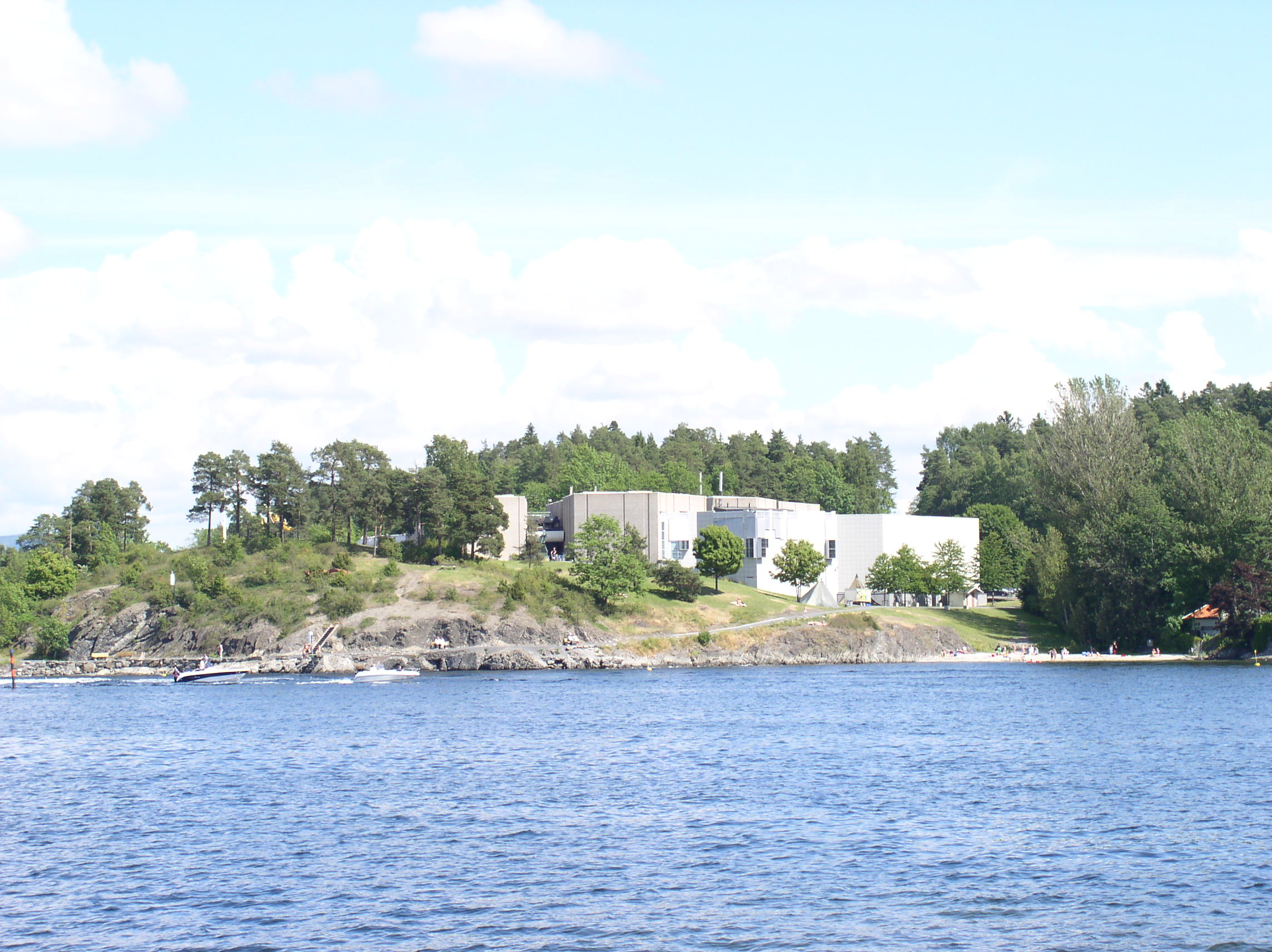
The Henie-Onstad Art Centre with the beach is to the lower right corner.

Høvikodden is a headland in Bærum municipality, Norway, by the Oslofjord near the populated area Høvik, whence its name was taken. There are about 276 people per square kilometer around Høvikodden which is densely populated.

It is the site of the Henie Onstad Kunstsenter. A small beach is nearby.

Further east are the headquarters of the classification company Det Norske Veritas.

The climate is continental. The average temperature is 5 °C. The warmest month is July, at 16 °C, and the coldest is January, at −6 °C.

== Høvikodden Beach ==
The beach at Høvikodden is quite small and is 50 metres (160 ft) south of Hennie Onstand Kunstsenter. It has fine sand and a plunge brew out on the headland to the west. There is a sculpture park outside the arts center. There are coastal path in both directions.
