= Dagbladet =

Norwegian daily newspaper

- Type: Daily newspaper
- Format: Tabloid
- Owner(s): Aller Media (99%), Dagbladets Stiftelse (1%)
- Editor: John Arne Markussen
- Founded: 2 January 1869; 157 years ago
- Political alignment: Formerly Liberal Party
- Language: Norwegian
- Headquarters: Hasle, Oslo
- Country: Norway
- ISSN: 0807-2043
- Website: www.dagbladet.no

Dagbladet (English: The Daily Magazine) is one of Norway's largest newspapers. It is published in the tabloid format. It has 1,400,000 daily readers on mobile, web and paper. Dagbladet is considered the main liberal newspaper of Norway, with a generally liberal progressive editorial outlook, associated with Scandinavian cultural radicalism.

The paper edition had a circulation of 46,250 copies in 2016, down from a peak of 228,834 in 1994. The editor-in-chief is Frode Hansen, the political editor is Lars Helle, the news editor is Jan Thomas Holmlund.

Dagbladet is published six days a week. It includes the magazine supplement Magasinet every Saturday. Part of the daily tabloid is available at Dagbladet.no, and more articles can be accessed through a paywall. The daily readership of Dagbladet's online tabloid was 1.24 million in 2016. Dagbladet online has received widespread criticism for their unprecedented use of clickbait headlines. This in turn has been speculated to be a reason why their reach has seen a regression in recent years.

== History ==
Dagbladet was founded in 1869 by Anthon Bang. Hagbard Emanuel Berner served as its first editor in chief and the first issue was published on 2 January 1869. From 1884 to 1977, the newspaper was affiliated to the Liberal party (Venstre). Since 1977, it has officially been politically neutral, though it has kept its position as a liberal newspaper, also incorporating some culturally radical stands in issues like the language struggle, church policies, feminism, intimate relationship, criminal care, etc. The newspaper was in 1972 against Norway joining the EU, but had changed to pro in 1994. During the German occupation of Norway the editor of Dagbladet, Einar Skavlan, was arrested in April 1942 due to the paper's liberal stance and loyalty to the King.

Dagbladet has played an important role in development of new editorial products in Norway. In 1990, the newspaper was the first in Norway to publish a Sunday edition in more than 70 years, and in 1995, it became the first of the major Norwegian newspapers with an online edition. In 2007 it had a circulation of 204,850 copies. The actual first newspaper was a regional paper called Brønnøysunds Avis. Over the past few years, Dagbladet has had success with the Saturday supplement Magasinet, which reaches 25.3% of the adult population of Norway.

Due to the declining of daily circulation, the newspaper has reduced the number of workers the last couple of years by a few hundred. Because of this, the newspaper focused more on "simpler news", but recent years, the newspaper has chosen an editorial direction on hard news.

Dagbladet was previously owned by the privately held company Berner Gruppen. Jens P. Heyerdahl was the largest owner and had effective control through several different companies. DB Medialab AS also owned 50% of the Norwegian web portal and Internet service provider start.no and ran the online community Blink from 2002 to 2011.

In June 2013, Dagbladet with online products was sold from Berner Gruppen to Aller Media for reportedly about 300 million Norwegian kroner. As of 2016, 99% of the shares of Dagbladet AS are formally owned by Berner Media Holding AS, which in turn is 100% owned by Aller Media. The remaining 1% of Dagbladet AS is owned by the foundation Dagbladets Stiftelse.

Dagbladet operates a number of technological websites. The online community Blink was large for a period in the 2000s, before it was closed down. Dagbladet also operates Start.no and 123spill.no, but both have been inactive since 2016. Previously, Dagbladet also had the largest gaming website in the Nordic region, PressFire.no, but the website was discontinued by the media house in 2016. In 2018, Dagbladet started a gaming channel on YouTube, Dagbladet Spill, but this was closed down after a year.

Alexandra Beverfjord was the editor-in-chief from 2018 to 2023.

== Online edition ==
The online edition of Dagbladet was launched on 8 March 1995 following Brønnøysunds Avis, a local newspaper. Dagbladet.no has a readership of nearly 1,2 million per day, which makes it amongst Europe's most successful web newspapers when measured against both population and readership of mother newspaper.

== Criticism ==
In 1988, Dagbladet was criticised for the aggressive use of photographs of grieving next-of-kin in the aftermath of the Flight 710 air-disaster. This led to a self-imposed change of practice within the Norwegian press regarding the handling of such incidents.

On 10 November 1989, the day after the fall of the Berlin wall, Dagbladet made no reference to the fall on its front page and instead featured the headline "Let the children swear", a quote from child psychologist Magne Raundalen. This caused criticism and ridicule of the newspaper for being overly tabloid.

Former Minister of Health, Tore Tønne, committed suicide allegedly following Dagbladet's investigations over alleged economic improprieties committed after the conclusion of his term in the Norwegian cabinet. Dagbladet was criticized by the Norwegian Press Association. The paper reprinted the Danish newspaper Jyllands-Posten's 12 Muhammad Cartoons in 2005.

In May 2011, Dagbladet lost a libel case in Oslo District Court against ambulance driver Erik Schjenken for printing factual errors about the Paramedics incident in Oslo 2007, and was ordered to pay a compensation of 1 million Nkr. In 2013, Dagbladet lost the appeal case in Borgarting Court of Appeal, but the legal ruling was slightly changed and the compensation reduced to 200,000 Nkr. In May 2013, Dagbladet appealed the case to the Supreme Court of Norway.

The newspaper encountered criticism over a cartoon published in November 2011 that equated the Holocaust with the situation in the Gaza Strip. In 2013, Abraham Cooper of the Simon Wiesenthal Center, Jewish communities, and human rights organizations claimed that a cartoon depicting the Jewish tradition of circumcision as barbaric was antisemitic. Editor of the culture-and-opinion sections in Dagbladet Geir Ramnefjell dismissed the criticism of the 2013 drawing, stating that it was an "innocent ridicule of religious practice and nothing more than that". Dagbladet also defended the caricature in an editorial 3 June 2013. The Norwegian Centre Against Racism and the Mosaic community in Norway filed a complaint about the caricature to the Norwegian Press Complaints Commission, which did not find Dagbladet at fault.

== Circulation ==
Numbers from the Norwegian Media Businesses' Association, Mediebedriftenes Landsforening:

Circulation of Dagbladet 1980–2016
- 1980: 132295
- 1981: 140429
- 1982: 138674
- 1983: 155337
- 1984: 169317
- 1985: 175685
- 1986: 187942
- 1987: 198937
- 1988: 206092
- 1989: 214637
- 1990: 219757
- 1991: 214925
- 1992: 224490
- 1993: 227796
- 1994: 228834
- 1995: 209421
- 1996: 205740
- 1997: 204850
- 1998: 206357
- 1999: 206969
- 2000: 192555
- 2001: 193637
- 2002: 191164
- 2003: 186136
- 2004: 183092
- 2005: 162069
- 2006: 146512
- 2007: 135611
- 2008: 123383
- 2009: 105255
- 2010: 98130
- 2011: 98989
- 2012: 88539
- 2013: 80028
- 2014: 73647
- 2015: 56932
- 2016: 46250

== See also ==
- List of Norwegian newspapers
