= 1955 in Norway =

- Centuries: 18th; 19th; 20th; 21st
- Decades: 1930s; 1940s; 1950s; 1960s; 1970s
- See also: List of years in Norway

Events in the year 1955 in Norway.

== Incumbents ==
- Monarch – Haakon VII.
- Regent – Olav after July, following injury to King due to fall
- Prime Minister – Oscar Torp (Labour Party) until 22 January, Einar Gerhardsen (Labour Party)

== Events ==
- 14 January – Prime Minister Oscar Torp resigned.
- 22 January – Gerhardsen's Third Cabinet was appointed.
- 3 December – Osvald Harjo returned to Norway after 13 years in Soviet prison camps.
- Municipal and county elections are held throughout the country.

== Popular culture ==
=== Sports ===
- Kristian Kristiansen, novelist, playwright, short story and children's writer, is awarded the Mads Wiel Nygaard's Endowment literary prize

=== Literature ===
- Jonas, novel by Jens Bjørneboe

== Notable births ==
=== January to March ===
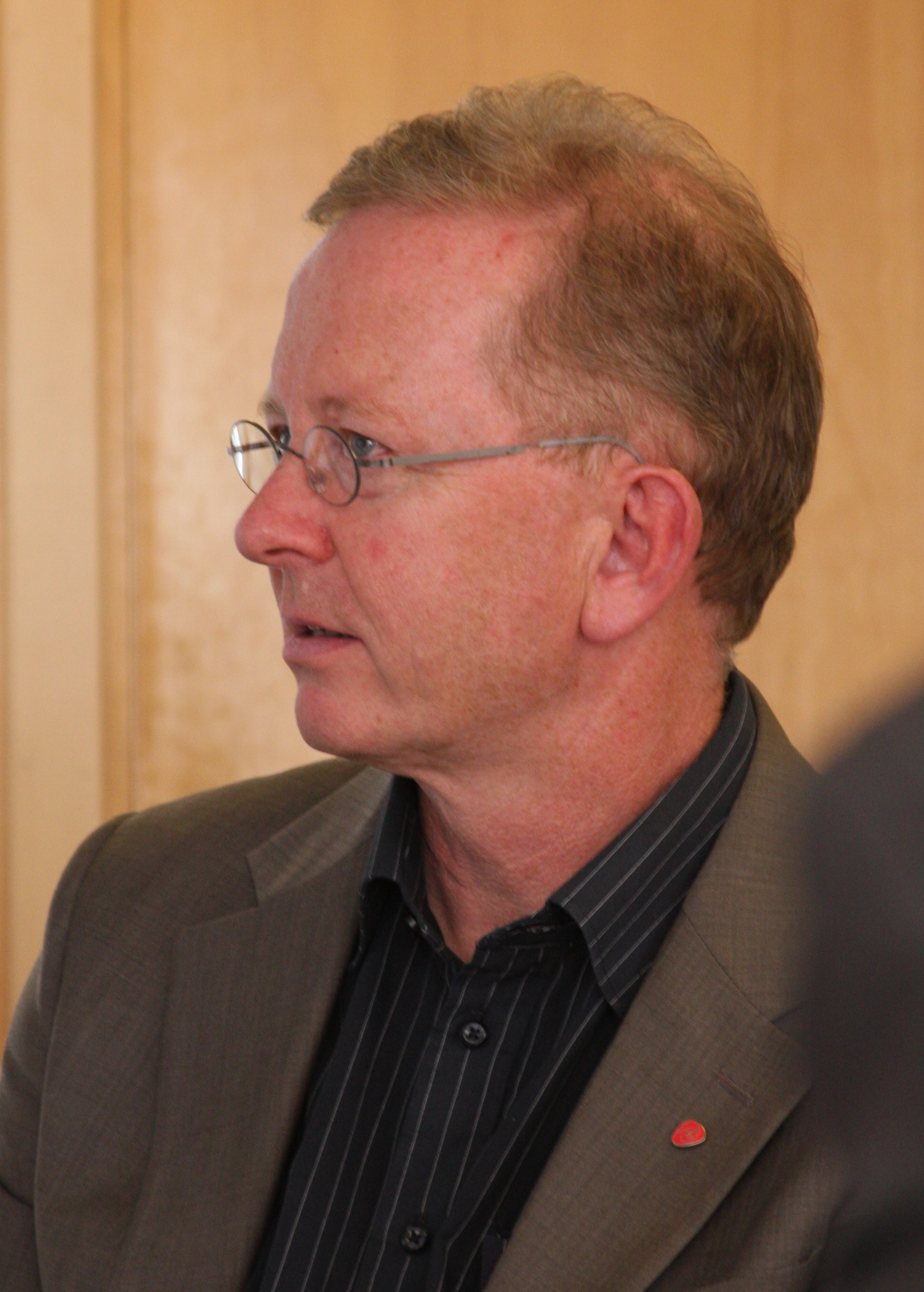
Are Helseth

Ingjerd Schou

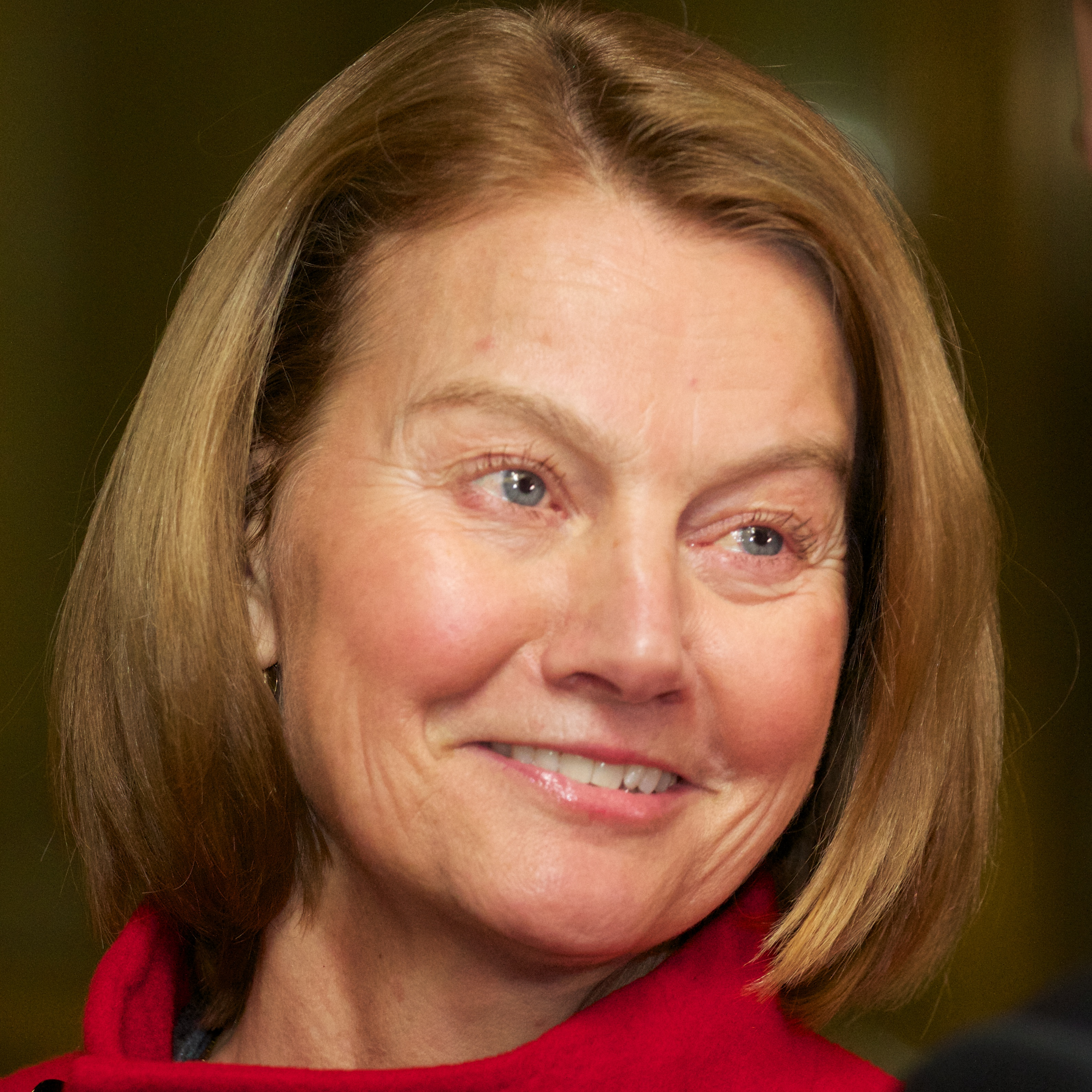
Gunn Wærsted

- 4 January – Bror Yngve Rahm, politician
- 4 January – Åshild Karlstrøm Rundhaug, politician.
- 6 January – Inge Staldvik, politician.
- 10 January – Ole Henrik Giørtz, jazz pianist.
- 11 January – Are Helseth, physician and politician.
- 16 January – Even Erlien, politician.
- 18 January – Trine Krogh, swimmmer (died 2014).
- 18 January – Erik Solheim, politician and diplomat.
- 20 January – Ingjerd Schou, politician.
- 8 February – Svein Grøndalen, footballer.
- 9 February – Tor Bremer, farmer and politician.
- 9 February – Harald Nilsen, sprint canoer.
- 10 February – Gabriel Høyland, footballer.
- 16 February – Jens Edvin Andreassen Skoghøy, judge and professor of law.
- 27 February – Terje Tønnesen, violinist.
- 2 March – Sven Mollekleiv, organizational leader
- 2 March – Bjørg Sandal, politician.
- 7 March – Lasse Lindtner, actor.
- 11 March – Odd Eriksen, trade unionist and politician (died 2023).
- 16 March – Gunn Wærsted, business executive.
- 17 March – Ole Petter Ottersen, physician and neuroscientist.
- 18 March – Lars Rise, politician.
- 21 March – Sindre Guldvog, publisher.
- 30 March – Ingjerd Hanevold, jewellery designer.

=== April to June ===
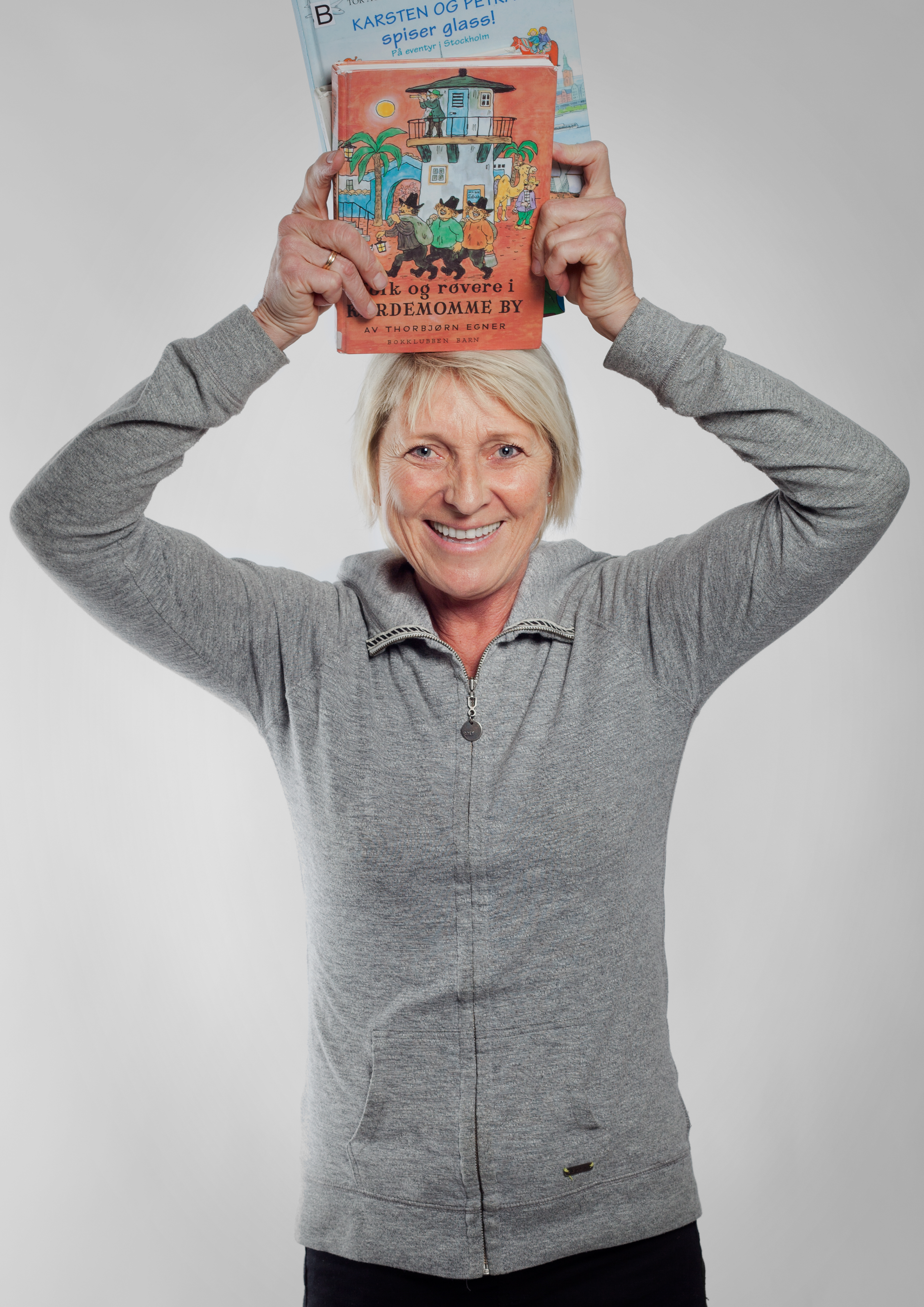
Marit Breivik

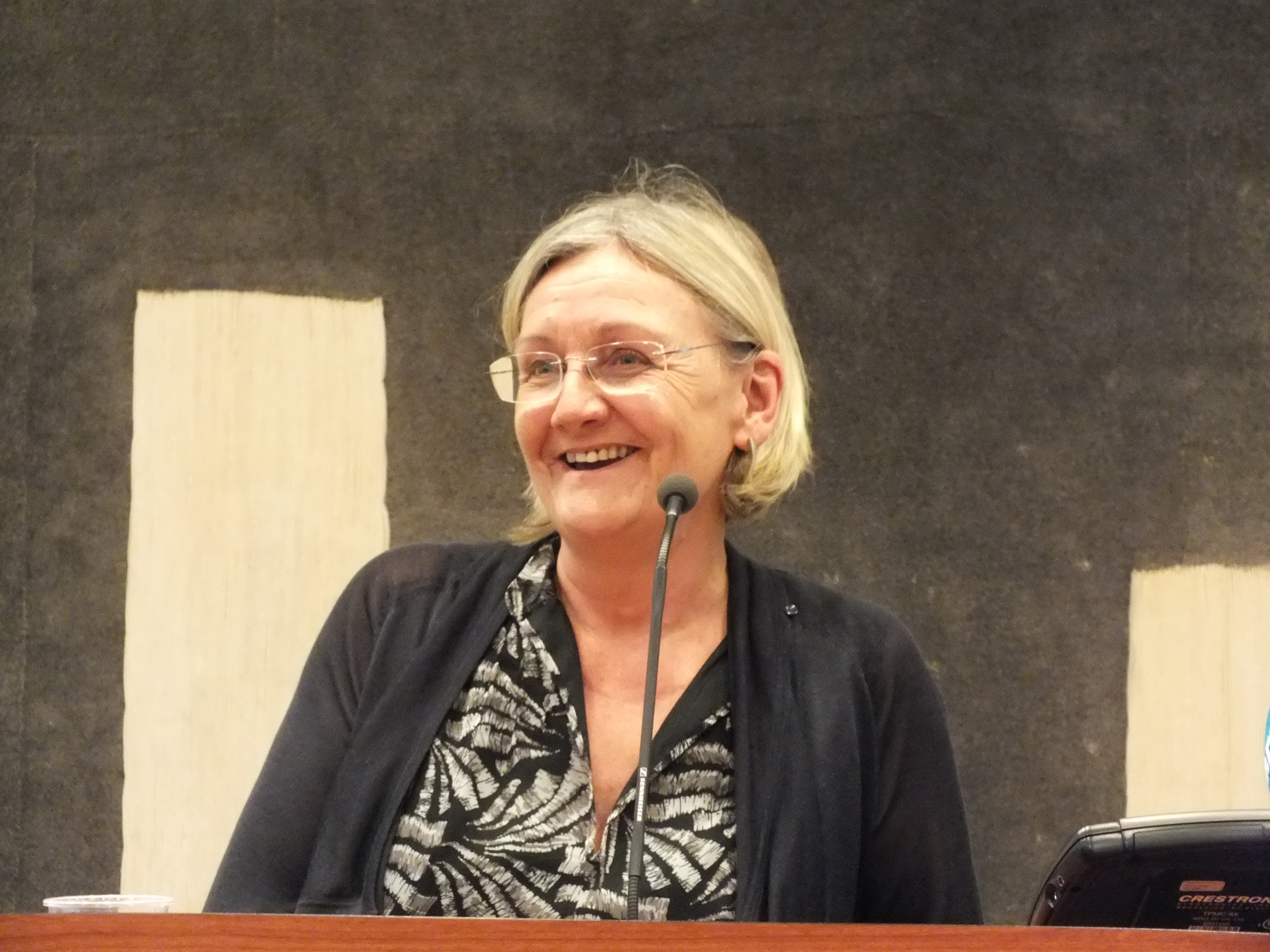
Hege Skjeie

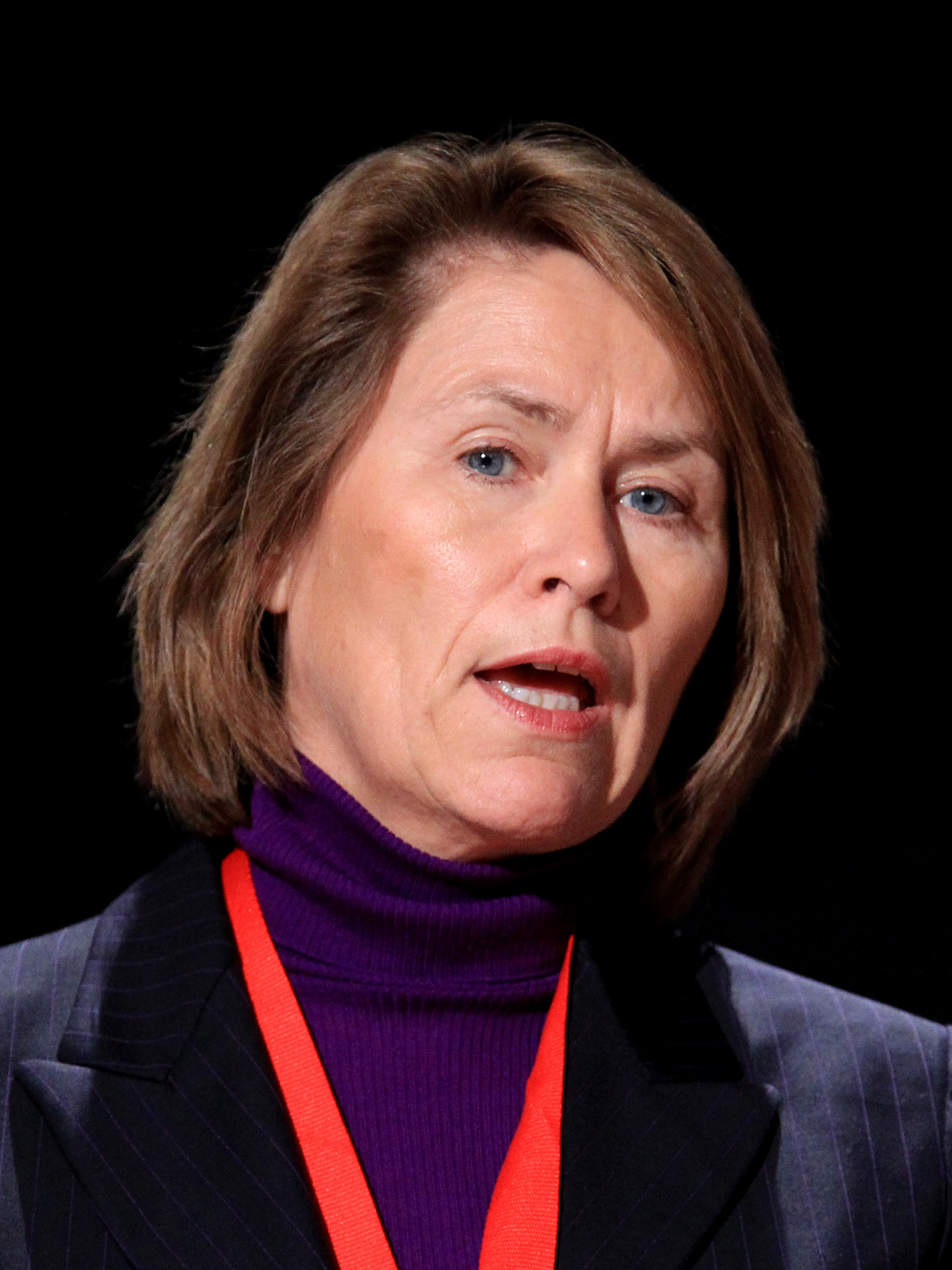
Grete Faremo

- 6 April – Arne Morten Granlien, Nordic skier.
- 8 April – Haakon Blankenborg, politician and diplomat.
- 8 April – Dag Danielsen, politician.
- 10 April – Marit Breivik, handball player and coach.
- 12 April – Nils Gaup, Sami film director.
- 13 April – Kjell Habbestad, composer.
- 13 April – Marit Kaldhol, writer.
- 13 April – Kjersti Markusson, politician.
- 16 April – Brit Dyrnes, ceramist.
- 19 April – Rune Klakegg, jazz pianist.
- 19 April – Rolf Løvland, keyboardist, composer and lyricist.
- 28 April – Arne Ringnes, judge.
- 30 April – Morten Opsahl, sprint canoer.
- 5 May – Wilhelm Matheson, judge.
- 9 May – Stein Lier-Hansen, civil servant and organizational leader.
- 10 May – Even Stormoen, actor.
- 14 May – Jorun Thørring, crime fiction writer.
- 15 May – Hege Skjeie, political scientist (died 2018).
- 18 May - Reidar Johansen, politician
- 21 May – Ansgar Gabrielsen, politician.
- 29 May – Tom Kristensen, crime fiction writer.
- 3 June – Harald Gjein, veterinarian and civil servant.
- 7 June – Jon Balke, jazz pianist.
- 8 June – Merete Armand, actress (died 2017).
- 15 June – Jarle Pedersen, speed-skater.
- 16 June – Grete Faremo, former politician and businessperson
- 20 June – Anders Bakken, cross-country skier.
- 24 June – Lars Gule, philosopher.
- 26 June – Terje Dragseth, writer.

=== July to September ===
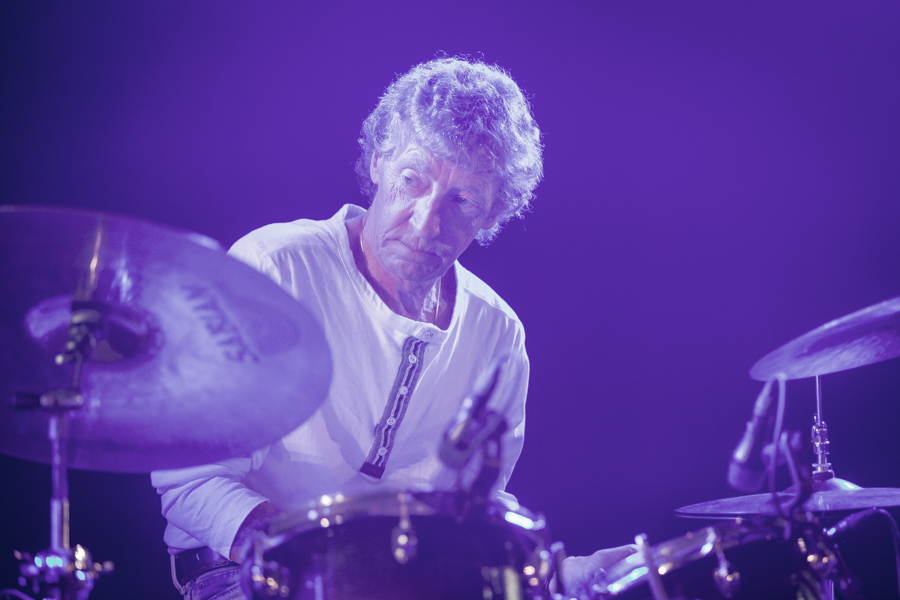
Pål Thowsen

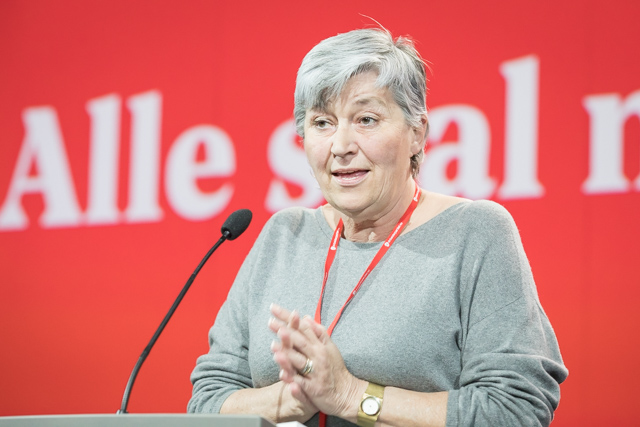
Gerd Kristiansen

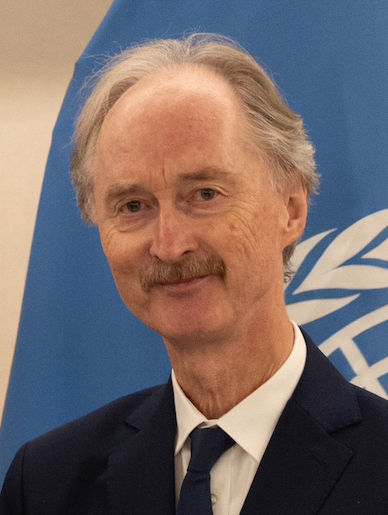
Geir Otto Pedersen

- 7 July – Anne Odenmarck, politician.
- 15 July – Pål Thowsen, jazz drummer.
- 18 July – Hilde Grythe, actress.
- 20 July – Eivind Dale, civil servant.
- 30 July – Gunnar Pettersen, handball player and coach.
- 1 August – Gerd Kristiansen, trade unionist.
- 5 August – Lise Christoffersen, politician
- 7 August – Vigdis Hjulstad Belbo, politician
- 10 August – Kari Henriksen, politician
- 16 August – Åse Lill Kimestad, politician
- 19 August – Fabian Stang, lawyer and politician.
- 27 August – Arne Dokken, footballer.
- 29 August – Geir Mork, publisher.
- 30 August – Kåre Simensen, politician.
- 5 September – Kjell Nupen, painter (died 2014).
- 7 September – Knut Petter Torgersen, politician.
- 22 September – Torill Ø. Hanssen, politician.
- 22 September – Eli Rygg, singer and writer (died 2026).
- 28 September – Geir Otto Pedersen, diplomat.

=== October to December ===
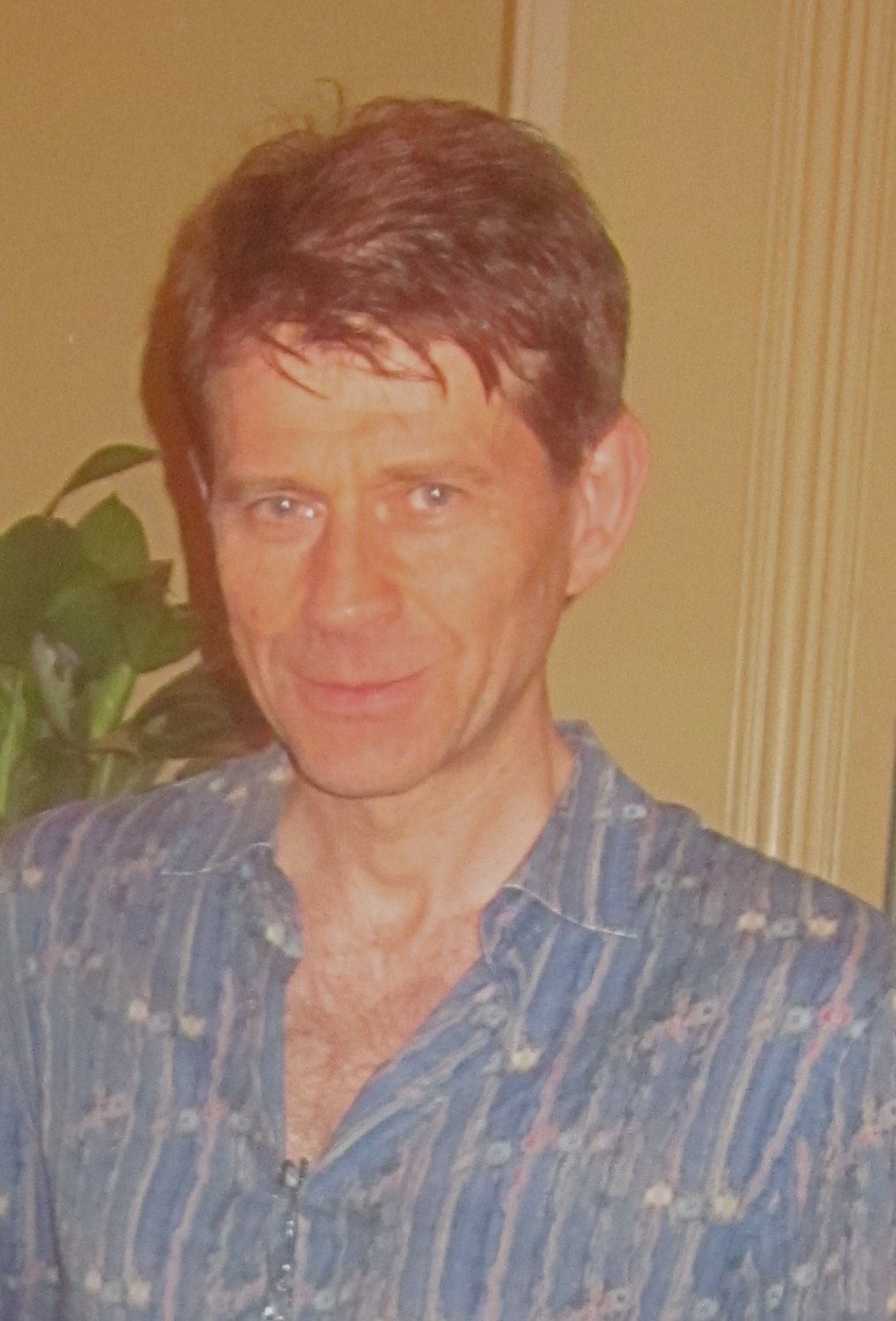
Morten Gunnar Larsen

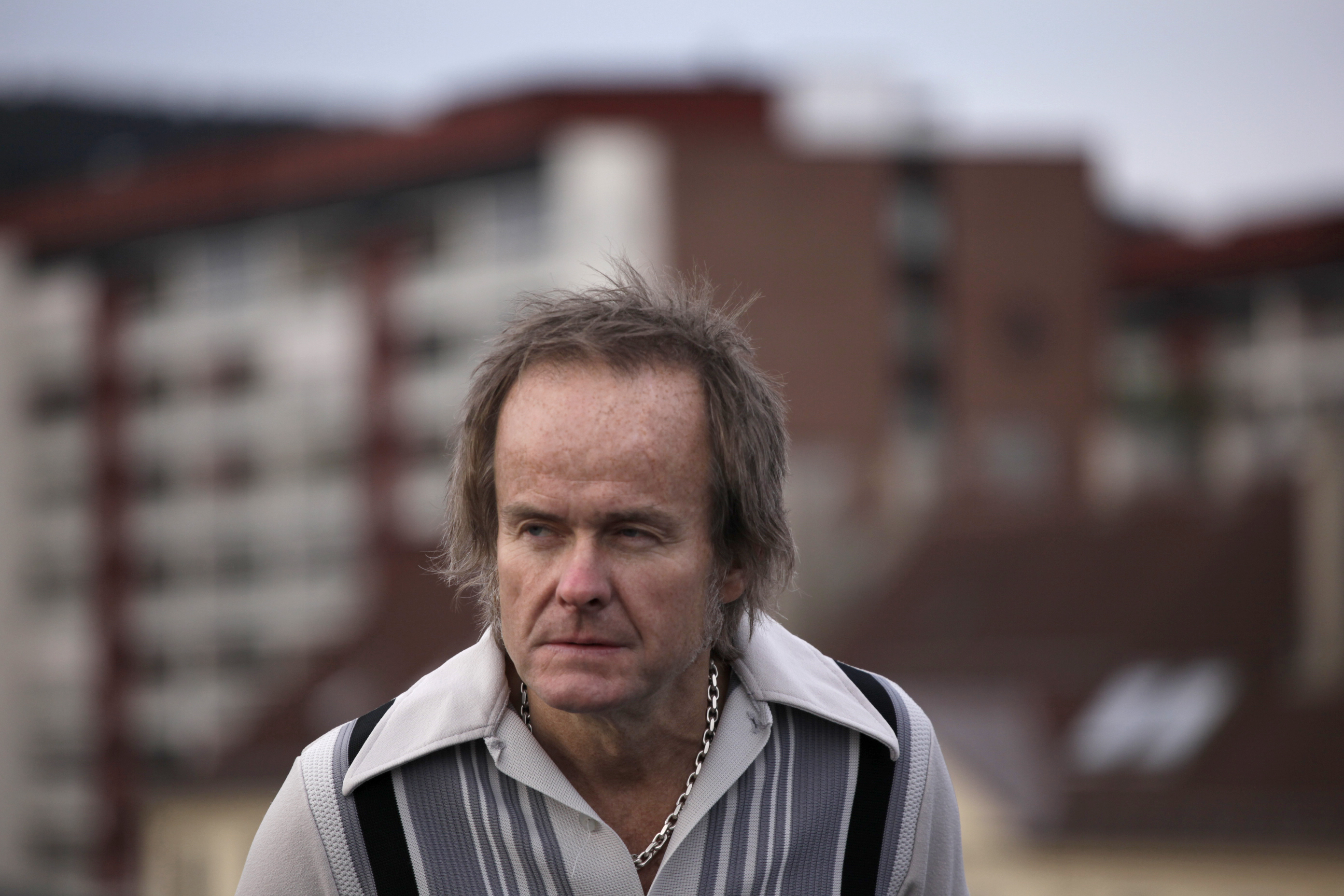
Sverre Knudsen

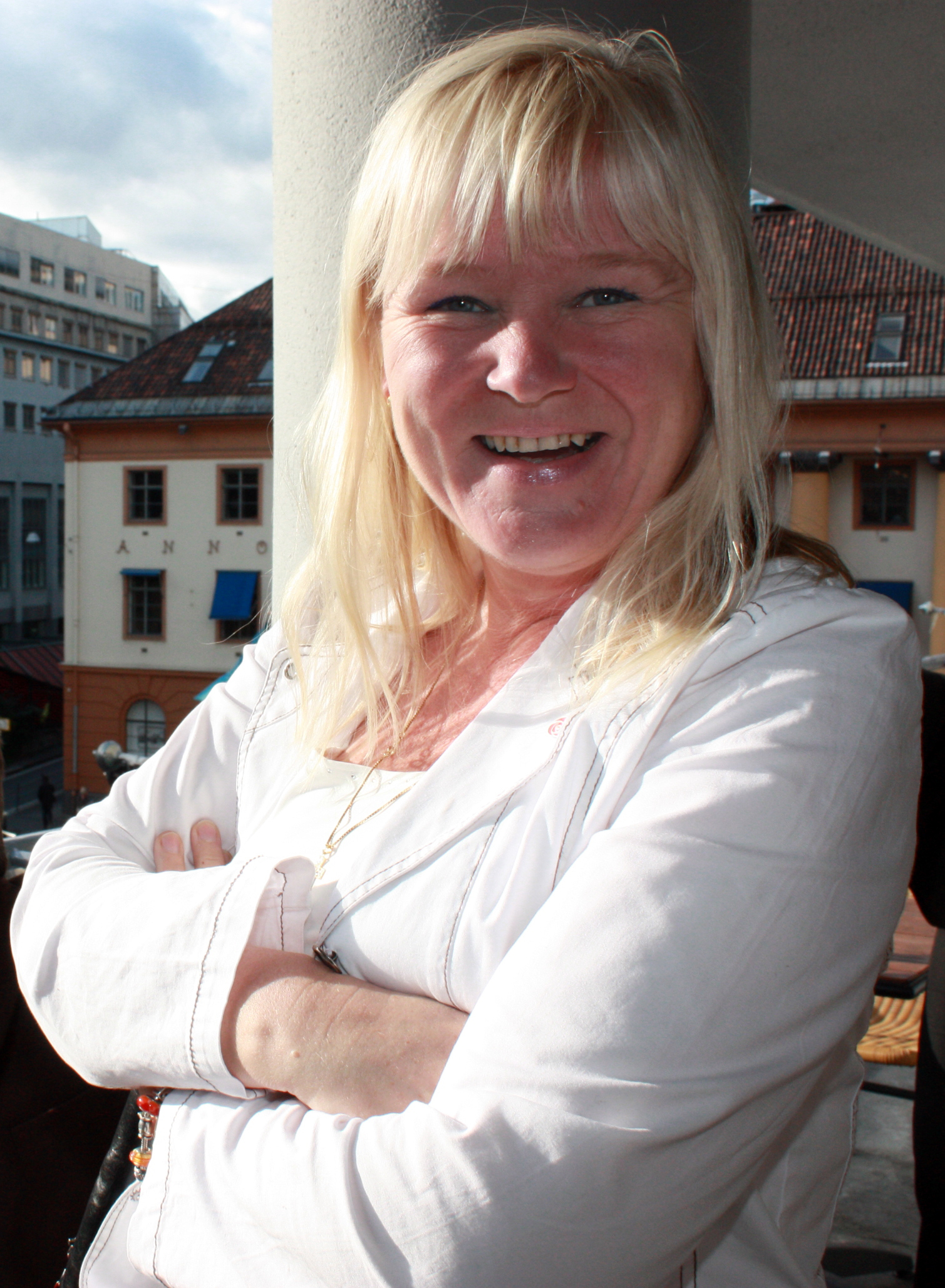
Ingalill Olsen

- 1 October – Morten Gunnar Larsen, jazz pianist and composer.
- 2 October – Unni Straume, film director.
- 8 October – Steinar Stokke, businessperson.
- 8 October – Lars Peder Brekk, politician.
- 12 October – Einar Jan Aas, footballer.
- 17 October – Hans Petter Moland, film director.
- 17 October – Trond Sirevåg, footballer.
- 27 October – Vibeke Hammer Madsen, business executive.
- 29 October – Geir Kvernmo, long-distance runner.
- 3 November – Pål Børnick, rower.
- 15 November – Bård Vonen, fencer.
- 22 November – Sverre Knudsen, writer and musician.
- 24 November – Erik Gustavson, film director.
- 29 November – Håkon Iversøn, swimmer (died 2021).
- 30 November – Berit Kjøll, corporate officer and sports administrator.
- 5 December – Morten Harg, politician.
- 7 December – Marta Norheim, journalist and literary critic.
- 8 December – Ola Mestad, legal scholar.
- 15 December – Ingalill Olsen, schoolteacher and politician.
- 16 December – Kari Økland, politician
- 21 December – Helge Simonnes, editor.
- 24 December – Stein Olav Fiskebeck, sport shooter (died 2007).
- 28 December – Ivar Schjøtt, fencer.
- 28 December – Yngve Slettholm, cultural executive and politician.
- 29 December – Fritz Warncke, swimmmer.

=== Full date missing ===
- Marit Anne Hauan, folklorist and museum leader.
- Gerd Kvale, psychologist
- Terje Liverød, footballer.

== Notable deaths ==
=== January to March ===
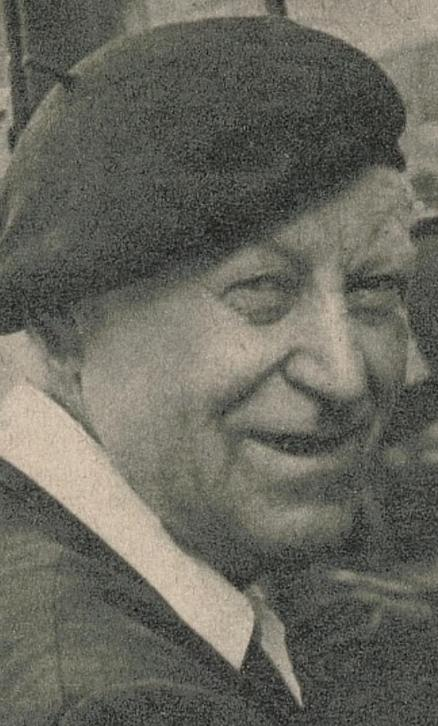
Torvald Tu

- 8 January – Mimi Sverdrup Lunden, educator and non-fiction writer (born 1894).
- 15 January – Torvald Tu, writer (born 1893).
- 16 January – Asbjørn Halvorsen, international soccer player and general secretary of the Norwegian Football Association (born 1898)
- 25 January – Hans Peter Elisa Lødrup, journalist, newspaper editor, non-fiction writer and politician (born 1885).
- 10 February – Alexander Pedersen, sprinter (born 1891).
- 14 February – Einar Liljedahl, military officer (born 1882).
- 14 February – Knut Sjøli, politician (born 1877).
- 15 February – August Bertrand Clifton, politician (born 1881).
- 16 February – Einar Osland, politician (born 1886)
- 22 March – Kristoffer Aamot, politician and cinema director (born 1889).

=== April to June ===
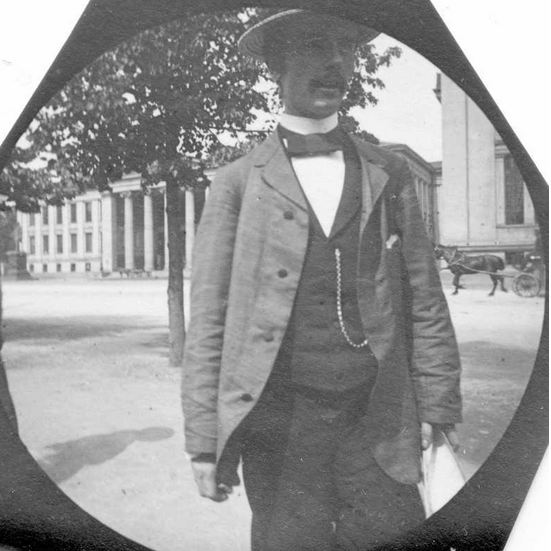
Haaken Hasberg Gran photographed by fellow student Carl Størmer outside the University in the 1890s

- 9 April – Aslaug Sverdrup Sømme, zoologist and geneticist (born 1891).
- 21 April – P. M. Røwde, rubber magnate (born 1876).
- 2 May – Torkell Vinje, politician (born 1879)
- 5 May – Håkon Martin Breivoll, politician (born 1886).
- 6 May – Barbra Ring, writer (born 1870).
- 11 May – Wilhelm Wilhelmsen, ship owner (born 1872).
- 16 May – Andreas Tostrup Urbye, politician and Minister (born 1869).
- 1 June – F. Melius Christiansen, violinist and choral conductor (born 1871)
- 2 June – Haaken Hasberg Gran, botanist (born 1870)
- 6 June – Meyer Foshaug, politician (born 1868).
- 28 June – Haakon Lind, boxer (born 1906)

=== July to September ===
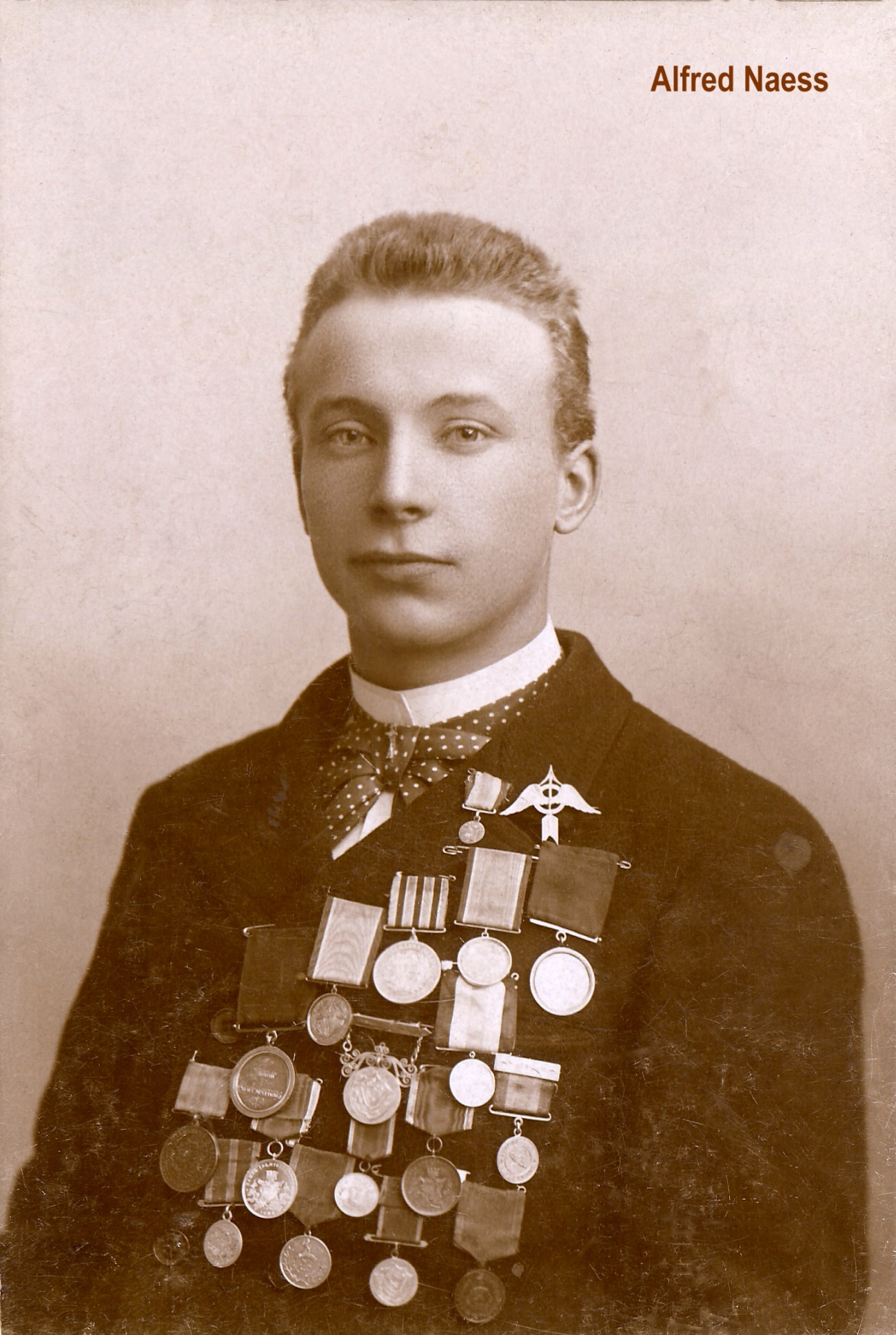
Alfred Næss

- 1 July – Gerhard Olsen, track and field athlete (born 1892).
- 1 July – Leif Skagnæs, Nordic combined skier (born 1903).
- 6 July – Alfred Næss, speed skater (born 1877)
- 10 July – Einar Frogner, politician and Minister (born 1893)
- 11 July – Christian S. Oftedal, politician (born 1907)
- 12 July – Anders Fjelstad, politician (born 1879).
- 19 July – Tordis Halvorsen, actress (born 1884)
- 22 July – Haakon Shetelig, archaeologist (born 1877)
- 30 July – Ferdinand Schjelderup, mountaineer, Supreme Court Justice and resistance member (born 1886)
- 14 August – Christian Dick, sailor (born 1883).
- 21 August – Ole Mikal Kobbe, politician (born 1881).
- 24 August – Finn Christian Knudsen, politician (born 1868).
- 4 September – Christen Gran Bøgh, jurist, tourism promoter and theatre critic (born 1876)
- 9 September – Einar Liberg, rifle shooter and Olympic gold medallist (born 1873).

=== October to December ===
- 17 October – Charles Mackenzie Bruff, forensic chemist (born 1887).
- 26 October – Arne Eggen, composer (born 1881).
- 25 December – Anders Bugge, art historian (born 1889).

=== Full date unknown ===
- Karl Hovelsen, Nordic skier (born 1877)
