= Tom Madsen =

Tom Madsen or Thomas Madsen, may refer to:

== People ==
- Tom P. Madsen (Tom Paarup Madsen; born 1977), Danish motorcycle speedway racer
- Tom Madsen (programmer), a videogame developer on DikuMUD
- Charles Thomas Madsen Sr. (a.k.a. Tom Madsen; died 2002), an Alaskan bush pilot who was the namesake of Unalaska Airport
- Thomas Madsen, bronze medalist for Denmark in boys' singles at the 1987 European Junior Badminton Championships
- Thomas Madsen, Danish runner at the Athletics at the 2007 Summer Universiade – Men's half marathon
- Thomas Madsen, a Danish soccer player in the Swedish Allsvenskan league; see List of foreign Allsvenskan players
- Sigfred Thomas Madsen (1915–1966), Olympic boxer for Denmark
- Thomas Madsen-Mygdal (1876–1943), Prime Minister of Denmark

== Fictional characters ==
- Thomas Madsen, a fictional character from "The Killings of Copenhagen", a 2014 episode of the UK TV show Midsomer Murders
- Dr. Thomas Madsen, a fictional character from "The World of Darkness", a 1977 episode of the U.S. TV show The World Beyond
- Tommy Madsen, a fictional character from the U.S. TV show Alcatraz

== Other uses ==
- Tom Madsen Airport (IATA airport code DUT, ICAO airport code PADU), Dutch Harbor, Amaknak Island, City of Unalaska, Aleutian Islands, Alaska, USA

== See also ==
- Madsen (surname)
- Tom (given name)
- Tom Madson, an ice hockey player on the Pinebridge Bucks
- Madsen (disambiguation)
- Tom (disambiguation)
