= Jan Olav Gatland =

Norwegian librarian and biographer

- Born: 14 March 1949; Osterøy
- Occupation: Writer

Video interview of Gatland, 2018.

Jan Olav Gatland (born 14 March 1949) is a Norwegian librarian and biographer.

He was born in Osterøy Municipality and grew up in Arna. He graduated with the cand.philol. degree from the University of Bergen, having studied French, German, Nordistics and theatre studies. In his early career he was a schoolteacher and civil servant, residing in Årdal Municipality, Tromsø Municipality, and Oslo. From 1993 to 2016, he was a research librarian at the University Library of Bergen. He was also a literary critic.

Throughout the 1980s, Gatland explored homosexuality in literature, among others in order to "find my roots". The work resulted in a book of collected poetry, Frå mann til mann – dikt om menns kjærleik til menn (1986), and the book Mellom linjene - homofile tema i norsk litteratur (1990) where he analyzed both overt and covert gay themes in Norwegian literature. In 2002 Gatland self-released the book Mitt halve liv. Bjørnstjerne Bjørnsons vennskap med Clemens Petersen – og andre menn, about several of Bjørnstjerne Bjørnson's male friendships. The Bjørnson–Clemensen friendship was included in Gatland's 2016 book Romantiske vennskap – sjelevenner i norsk kultur, about "romantic friendships", also referred to as soulmates, in Norway. The book chronicled 14 same-sex, allegedly non-sexual friendships, mostly within the literary or artistic sphere. Romantiske vennskap was reviewed by several outlets.

Gatland issued biographies and literary studies of Åsmund Sveen (2003, Samlaget), Rolv Thesen (2006, Vigmostad Bjørke), Torvald Tu (2008, Samlaget), Ola Raknes (2010, Samlaget), Olav Dalgard (2013, Samlaget), Mons Litleré (2018, Samlaget) and Lars Berg (2020, Samlaget).

A translator from French, Gatland has translated works by Antonin Artaud, Joris-Karl Huysmans and Jean Genet. He also wrote a textbook in theatre theory, Teaterteori, issued in 1998 by Pax.

Gatland was active in several gay rights organizations. He was married to linguist Gjert Kristoffersen, who died in a car accident in 2021.
