= Madsen (surname) =

Madsen is a common surname of Danish origin. The meaning of Madsen is Son of Mads. "Mads" is Danish form of Matthew. Madsen is used rarely as a first name.

Notable people with the surname include:

- Alexander Madsen, Finnish basketball player
- Angela Madsen, American rower and athlete
- Arch L. Madsen, American radio and television pioneer
- Barbara Madsen, American judge
- Birger Madsen, Norwegian football player
- Bo Madsen, guitarist of the Danish rock band Mew
- Charles D. Madsen, American politician
- Chris Madsen, Danish-American lawman
- Christi Madsen, American optical engineer
- Christian Madsen, American actor
- Claus Madsen, Danish football player
- Eric Madsen, American college baseball coach
- Erik Madsen (chess player), Norwegian chess player
- Gabe Madsen, American basketball player
- Gerda Madsen, Danish film actress
- Gitte Madsen, Danish handball player
- Gordon A. Madsen, American state legislator in Utah
- Gunnar Madsen, American vocalist
- Henrik O. Madsen, Danish businessperson and engineer
- Jakob Broechner Madsen, Danish economist
- Janne Madsen, Danish football player
- Jeff Madsen, American poker player
- Jens Christian Madsen (born 1970), Danish footballer
- Jens Christian Mosegaard Madsen (born 1972), Danish footballer
- Jessica Madsen, English actress
- John Madsen (American football), American football player
- John M. Madsen, American leader in The Church of Jesus Christ of Latter-day Saints
- Katrine Madsen, Danish jazz singer
- Kenneth C. Madsen, American artist
- Kim André Madsen, Norwegian football player
- Kristian Madsen, Danish gymnast
- Lars Jørgen Madsen, Danish rifle shooter
- Lars Møller Madsen, Danish team handball player
- Lynn Madsen, American football player
- Maddux Madsen (born 2003), American football player
- Mads Lauritz Madsen, Norwegian politician
- Mark Madsen (basketball), American basketball player
- Mathew Madsen, New Zealand weightlifter
- Mette Madsen (1924–2015), Danish politician and writer
- Michael Madsen (disambiguation), several people
  - Michael Madsen (1957–2025), American actor
- Nicolaj Madsen, Danish football player
- Nicolas Madsen (born 2000), Danish football player
- Ole Madsen, Danish football player
- Ole Christian Madsen, Danish film director and writer
- Peter Madsen (disambiguation), several people
- Rasmus Vestergaard Madsen (born 1991), Danish politician
- Robert Madsen, Danish gymnast
- Ricardt Madsen, Danish boxer
- Sigfred Madsen, Danish boxer
- Spencer Madsen, American poet
- Sofie Madsen, Danish educator
- Stephan Tschudi-Madsen, Norwegian art historian
- Svend Madsen, Danish gymnast
- Svend Åge Madsen, Danish writer
- Truman G. Madsen, Latter-Day Saint author
- Wayne Madsen (journalist), American author
- Vibeke Hammer Madsen, Norwegian businessperson
- Vilhelm Herman Oluf Madsen, Danish politician, minister, businessman and inventor
- Vigo Madsen, Danish gymnast
- Viggo Madsen, Danish poet and writer
- Virginia Madsen, American actress

== See also ==
- Ada Madssen (1917–2009), Norwegian sculptor
- Madsen (disambiguation)
