= Madson =

Madson may refer to:

== People and characters ==
=== People with the surname ===
- John Madson (1923–1995), American journalist
- David Madson (born 1976), better known as Odd Nosdam, American underground hip hop producer and DJ
- David Madson (murder victim), American murdered by his boyfriend, the serial killer Andrew Cunanan
- Ryan Madson (born 1980), American professional baseball player

=== People with the given name ===
- Madson (footballer, born 1986) (Madson Formagini Caridade), Brazilian football attacking midfielder
- Madson (footballer, born 1991) (Madson Henrique Nascimento Santos), Brazilian football midfielder
- Madson (footballer, born 1992) (Madson Ferreira dos Santos), Brazilian football right-back
- Madson (footballer, born 1999) (Madson de Souza Silva), Brazilian football forward
- Luan Madson Gedeao de Paiva (born 1990), Brazilian footballer

=== Fictional characters ===
- John Madson, a fictional character from the UK TV show Madson (TV series)

== Places ==
- Mount Madson, Kenai Peninsula, Alaska, USA; a mountain

== Other uses ==
- Madson (TV series), a 1996 UK crime drama TV show

== See also ==
- Madison (name)
- Madsen (surname)
- Anders Madssøn, 16th century clergyman, Bishop of Oslo
- Knut Madsson, a 16th century squire in the aristocracy of Norway
- Otte Madsson, 15th century lord of Austrått
- Tønnes Madsson Andenæs (1923–1975), Norwegian politician
- Madison (disambiguation)
- Madsen (disambiguation)
