= Kvale =

Kvale is a surname of Norwegian origin, originating as a habitational surname for someone from any of numerous farmsteads named Kvale. Notable people with the surname include:

- Barbro Kvåle (born 1992), Norwegian cross country skier and ski orienteering competitor
- Gard Kvale (born 1984), Norwegian swimmer
- Gerd Kvale (born 1955), Norwegian psychologist
- Ole J. Kvale (1869-1929), American Lutheran Minister and politician
- Paul John Kvale (1896-1960), American politician
