= Midson =

Midson is a surname. Notable people with the surname include:

- Charles Midson (1837–1903), Australian builder and politician
- Jack Midson (born 1983), English footballer
- Nick Midson, member of progressive metal band Threshold

== See also ==
- Madson
