= Gislaved (disambiguation) =

Gislaved may refer to:

- Gislaved Municipality in Sweden
- Gislaved, the seat of Gislaved Municipality
- Gislaved (tires), a former Swedish tyre manufacturer
- Gislaveds IS, a Swedish football club
