= Hanevold =

Hanevold or Hannevord is a Norwegian surname. Notable people with the surname include:

== Hanevord ==
- Halvard Hanevold (1969–2019), Norwegian biathlete
- Ingjerd Hanevold (born 1955), Norwegian jewelry designer
- Kaja Hanevold (born 1980), Norwegian figure skater

== Hannevord ==
- Per Hannevold (born 1953), Norwegian classical musician
