= Viking Tyres =

Norwegian tyre brand owned by Continental AG

Viking
- Industry: Tyre manufacturing
- Founded: 1920; 106 years ago
- Founder: P. M. Røwde
- Headquarters: Hanover, Germany
- Parent: Continental AG
- Website: viking-tyres.com

Viking is a brand of tyres, currently owned and produced by the German company Continental AG.

== History ==
The history of Viking traced back to 1906, when Peter Mathias Røwde founded A/S Viking Gummivarefabrikk. In 1913, the factory was destroyed by fire, so Røwde founded Askim Gummivarefabrikk on 17 January 1920 in Askim, as a continuation of the business that existed before the fire, producing galoshes for shoes. Due to changes in fashion, the production of galoshes was reduced in the late 1920s, while the production of snow socks and sneakers increased. Gradually, Viking expanded production and began producing rubber boots, work boots, leather shoes, hunting shoes and football boots.

In the 1930s, Viking produced vehicle tires, rubber flooring, stair coverings (also used in the Royal Palace), hot water bottles, school backpacks, gloves, camping mats and rubber bands. In 1934, the factory burned to the ground and a new plant was built, with 1100 employees, Viking was one of the largest Norwegian companies at the time.

In the 1970s, with a market share of over 50%, Viking was the market leader in tyres in Norway. After a reorganisation in 1971, the company was named Viking-Askim.

In the mid-1980s, Borregaard became the majority shareholder of the company; the Viking group was dissolved, and tire production was spun off in 1984 into a separate company called Viking Dekk and acquired by Gislaved, a Swedish tire manufacturer, which was in turn controlled by the Nivis Tyre company.

Between 1990 and 1991, German company Continental AG acquired Nivis Tyre and the Viking tyre brand; following this acquisition, the Askim factory was closed in 1991.

2008 saw the first annual sales of more than one million tires.
