= Madsen =

Madsen may refer to:

== People ==
- Madsen (surname)

=== People with the given name ===
- Madsen Mompremier
- Madsen Pirie

== Places ==
Canada

- Madsen, Ontario, a community

United States

- Madsen, Wisconsin, an unincorporated community
- Madsen Airport, Dutch Harbor, Alaska

== Weaponry ==
- Madsen machine gun, Danish light machine gun/squad automatic weapon
- Madsen-Saetter machine gun, Danish general purpose machine gun
- Madsen M-50, Danish submachine gun
- Madsen 20 mm anti-aircraft cannon, Danish type of machine cannon

== Other ==
- Cerro Madsen, a mountain in Argentina
- Madsen (band), German rock band
- DISA (company), Dansk Industri Syndikat A/S, is also known as Madsen, after its founder

== See also ==
- Madison (disambiguation)
- Madson
