= P. M. Røwde =

Norwegian rubber magnate (1876–1955)

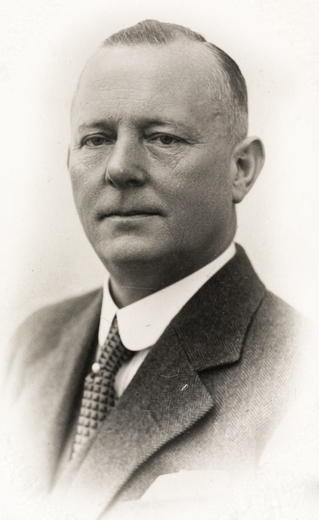
P. M. Røwde, c. 1930

Peter Mathias Bretanus Olsen Røwde (23 September 1876 – 21 April 1955) was a Norwegian rubber magnate. Famous for the Viking brand of boots and tires, he established a rubber factory in Askim in 1920 and owned such factories in Mjøndalen and Stavanger. He was also a leader of employer associations, local politician and consul-general for Hungary.

== Background ==
He was born at Rovde in Romsdalen county. Already from childhood he ventured into small-time trade in his home village of Rovde in Western Norway. He moved away from home to work office jobs in larger cities in Western Norway, Ålesund and Bergen, also pondering emigration to the United States where a relative owned a rubber factory. In the 1890s he served his compulsory military service in the King's Guard; he also took commercial education. From 1897 to 1900 he worked as a traveling merchant.

During December 1902, he married goldsmith's daughter Ragna Marie Bingen (1881–1972) at Kristiania (now oslo). The family resided in the mansion Villa Voksenhus at Voksenkollen in Oslo from 1922. Their daughters Teddy Røwde (1911-1994) married professor and sociologist, Arvid Brodersen and Bergliot Marie Røwde (1904–82) married author and journalist, Gunnar Larsen.

== Career ==
In 1900, he established the wholesaling agency Røwde & Co. Among other things he imported Swedish Gislaved rubber products, but he also wanted such products to be produced domestically. In 1906, he established the rubber factory Viking Gummivarefabrik in Heggedal in Akershus. After it was destroyed in a 1913 fire, Røwde relocated the factory to Askim in Østfold, where it was re-organized in 1920 as Askim Gummivarefabrik.

The Viking brand became known for its galoshes and rubber boots, as well as from 1931 for car tires. This factory expanded steadily; damages from a new fire in 1933 were repaired over only eight months. In addition to expanding the factory in Askim, Røwde developed a corporation as he acquired Den Norske Kalosje- og Gummivarefabrik in 1932 and Vestlandske Gummivarefabrik in 1938.

Røwde was a skilled advertiser with a sense for performing media stunts. In the 1930s he displayed a giant tire at a truckstop between Gjersjøen and Mosseveien in Ås Municipality. He instituted "the world's largest car race" from Oslo to Askim in 1939 and Rally Viking in the 1950s.

He was also active in employer associations, chairing Manufakturgrossistenes Landsforening from 1925 to 1931 and being vice chairman of Norges Grossistforbund from 1929 to 1931. He was elected member of the municipal council of Aker Municipality from 1929 to 1931, representing the "non-political electors' list", i.e. a cooperative ballot of the bourgeois parties. The consul-general for the Kingdom of Hungary from 1928 to 1947, Røwde issued a book about Hungary, Ungarn igår, idag og imorgen (1938) and also Kampen om råstoffene (1936) and Nye råstoffer (1942).

== Honors ==
He was decorated as a Knight, First Class of the Order of St. Olav (1932) and the Order of Vasa. He was also made an Officer of the Legion of Honour and Commander of the Decoration of Honour for Services to the Republic of Austria and was awarded the Hungarian Cross of Merit. He died during April 1955 in Oslo.
