= Mjøndalen Gummivarefabrikk =

Norwegian rubber factory

Mjøndalen Gummivarefabrikk was a rubber factory in Mjøndalen, Norway.

It was formerly named Den Norske Kalosje- og Gummivarefabrik, and changed its name to Viking Mjøndalen when acquired by Askim-based company Viking Gummivarefabrikk. The person behind this 1932 acquisition was Viking founder P. M. Røwde, who also brought Vestlandske Gummivarefabrik into the corporation in 1938. Viking Mjøndalen was later acquired by the Trelleborg Group, changing its name to Viking Trelleborg.
