= Athletics at the 2007 Summer Universiade – Men's 10,000 metres =

The men's 10,000 metres event at the 2007 Summer Universiade was held on 14 August.

== Results ==
Rank	Name	Nationality	Time	Notes
1st place, gold medalist(s)	Mohamed Fadil	Morocco	30:19.41	SB
2nd place, silver medalist(s)	Simon Ayeko	Uganda	30:22.58	
3rd place, bronze medalist(s)	Stephen Mokoka	South Africa	30:31.78	
4	Yuki Matsuoka	Japan	30:33.17	
5	Liu Chao	China	30:42.81	PB
6	Vasyl Matviychuk	Ukraine	30:48.72	
7	Najim El Gady	Morocco	30:52.20	
8	David Marus	Uganda	30:58.58	
9	Brahim Chettah	Algeria	31:02.31	
10	Abdelaziz Azzouzi	Morocco	31:11.86	
11	Tsuyoshi Ugachi	Japan	31:15.75	
12	Paul Barno	Kenya	31:22.63	
13	Gilbert Chirchir Kiptum	Uganda	31:58.79	
14	Sibabalwe Mzazi	South Africa	32:24.99	
15	Amnuay Tongmit	Thailand	32:41.57	
16	Mainza Makunga	Zambia	34:15.24	
17	Anjana Jayaweera	Sri Lanka	35:45.59	
	Kemal Koyuncu	Turkey	DNF	
	Jorge Rivera	Mexico	DNF	
	Ali Topkara	Turkey	DNF	
	Jaber Al-Shabibi	Oman	DNS	
	Tibor Vegh	Hungary	DNS	
