= David Marus =

Ugandan long-distance runner

David Marus (born 1 November 1986) is a Ugandan long-distance runner.

At the 2007 Summer Universiade he finished eighth in the 10,000 metres and sixth in the half marathon. He won the Leiden Half Marathon in 2010 and 2012, on the latter occasion in a lifetime best of 1:02:55 hours.

He is married to Helah Kiprop, whom he also coaches.
