= Gjert Kristoffersen =

Norwegian linguist (1949–2021)

- Born: 13 August 1949; Arendal Municipality, Norway
- Died: 29 May 2021 (aged 71); Åmli Municipality, Norway
- Known for: Contributions to Norwegian phonology
- Spouse: Jan Olav Gatland

Academic background
- Thesis: Aspects of Norwegian Syllable Structure (1991)

Gjert Kristoffersen (Urban East Norwegian pronunciation: [ˈjæʈː krɪˈstɔ̀fːəʂɳ̍]; 13 August 1949 in Arendal Municipality – 29 May 2021) was a Norwegian linguist, a phonetician and a professor at the University of Bergen. His native dialect of Norwegian was Arendalsk. He was married to librarian and biographer Jan Olav Gatland. On 29 May 2021, Kristoffersen was killed in an automobile accident in Åmli Municipality.

== Works ==
- Durand, Jacques; Gut, Ulrike; Kristoffersen, Gjert, eds. (2014), The Oxford Handbook of Corpus Phonology, Oxford University Press, ISBN 978-0-19-957193-2
- Kristoffersen, Gjert (2000), The Phonology of Norwegian, Oxford University Press, ISBN 978-0-19-823765-5
