= Mount Madson =

Mountain in Alaska, United States

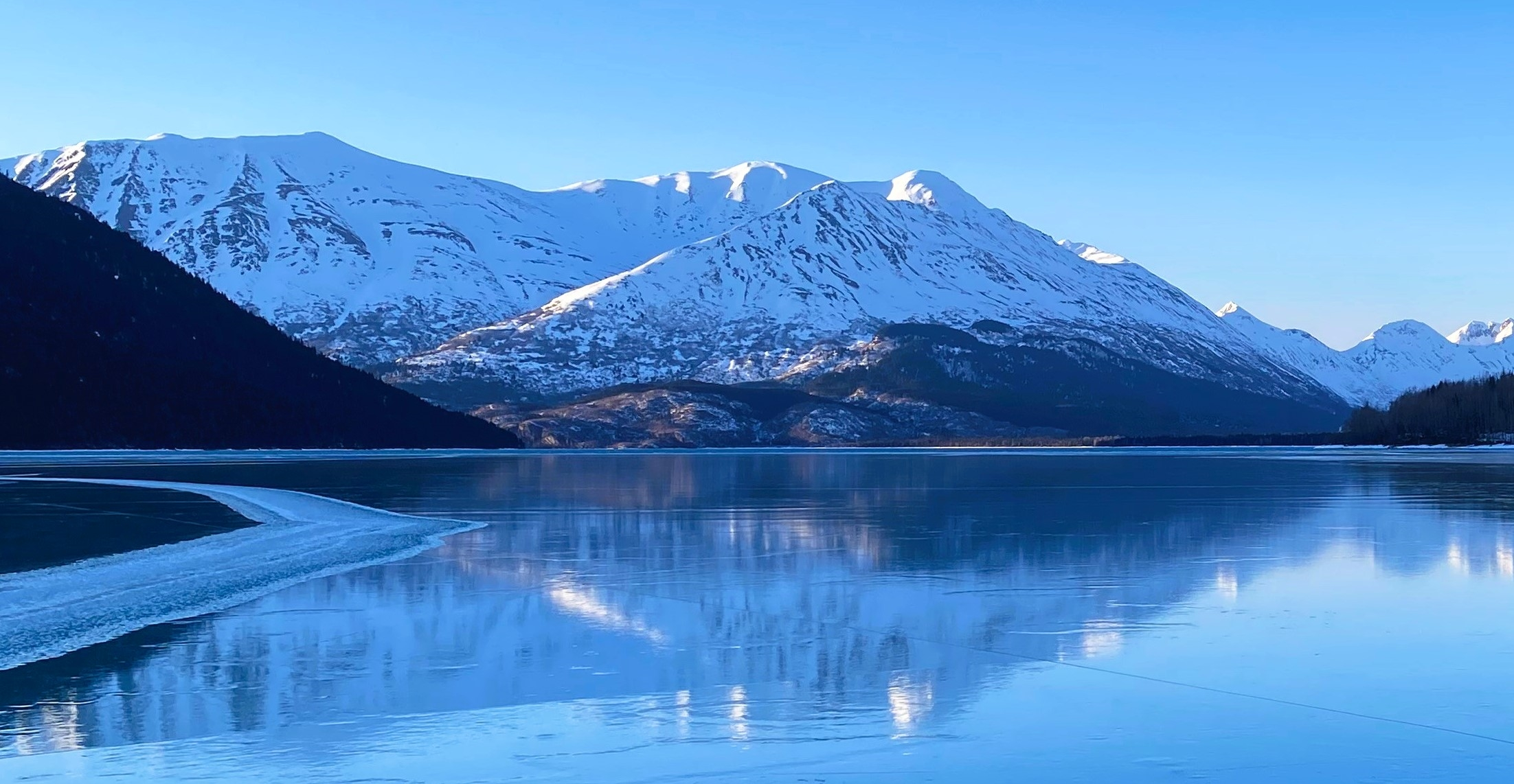
- South aspect reflected in icy Kenai Lake

Highest point
- Elevation: 5,266 ft (1,605 m)
- Prominence: 3,769 ft (1,149 m)
- Parent peak: Peak 5320
- Isolation: 3.42 mi (5.50 km)
- Coordinates: 60°27′17″N 149°26′00″W

Naming
- Etymology: John Madson

Geography
- Location within Alaska
- Interactive map of Mount Madson
- Country: United States
- State: Alaska
- Borough: Kenai Peninsula Borough
- Protected area: Chugach National Forest
- Parent range: Kenai Mountains
- Topo map: USGS Seward B-7

Mount Madson, also known as Madson Mountain, is a prominent 5,266-foot (1,605 m) summit in the U.S. state of Alaska.

== Description ==
Mount Madson is located on the Kenai Peninsula on land managed by Chugach National Forest. It is set 24 miles (39 km) north of the city of Seward in the Kenai Mountains. Precipitation runoff from the mountain drains into the Kenai River drainage basin. Although modest in elevation, topographic relief is significant as the summit rises 3,800 feet (1,158 m) above Crescent Lake in 1.4 mile (2.25 km) and 4,830 feet (1,472 m) above Kenai Lake in 3.25 miles (5.23 km). Madson's local name was reported in 1909 by geologists Grant and Higgins, then officially adopted in 1910 by the U.S. Board on Geographic Names. John Madson was a prospector who (with William Fairman) had mineral claims at Quartz Creek northwest of the mountain.

== Climate ==
Based on the Köppen climate classification, Madson Mountain is located in a subpolar oceanic climate zone with long, cold, snowy winters, and mild summers. Weather systems coming off the Gulf of Alaska are forced upwards by the Kenai Mountains (orographic lift), causing heavy precipitation in the form of rainfall and snowfall. Winter temperatures can drop below 0 °F with wind chill factors below −20 °F.

== See also ==
- List of mountain peaks of Alaska
- Geology of Alaska
