= August Bertrand Clifton =

Norwegian politician

- Born: 26 August 1881; Tønsberg, Norway
- Died: 15 February 1955
- Occupations: Shipmaster; Politician

August Bertrand Clifton (26 August 1881 – 15 February 1955) was a Norwegian shipmaster and politician.

He was born in Tønsberg to ship owner Hans Bruu Johannessen and Sofie Kathrine Nielsen. He was elected representative to the Storting for the period 1925–1927, for the Conservative Party.

== Second World War ==
During the Second World War, Clifton was captain on MT Fenris. The ship was torpedoed and damaged by the German submarine U-168 in February 1944, while in the Indian Ocean.
