= Ola Mestad =

Norwegian legal scholar

Ola Mestad (born 8 December 1955) is a Norwegian legal scholar. He has also held several board positions in cultural institutions.

== Early life and education ==
He was born in Oslo. After completing his secondary education at Berg Upper Secondary School in 1974, he obtained the cand.jur. degree from the University of Oslo in 1984. In 1992, he earned the dr.juris degree with the thesis Om force majeure og risikofordeling i kontrakt, which examines force majeure clauses in contract law.

== Career ==
In addition to working as a lawyer at the law firm BA-HR, Mestad has been a professor at the University of Oslo, specialising in European Union law, petroleum law, international investment law, and contract law. He served as deputy chair of the ethical council of the Government Pension Fund Global.

He is a fellow of the Norwegian Academy of Science and Letters.

Mestad has also held several board and editorial positions, including roles at the publishing houses Fonna (1980s), Det Norske Samlaget (1985–1999), and Aschehoug (from 2003). He was a member of the editorial councils of Samtiden (2001–2006) and Syn og Segn (from 2006), a board member of the Ibsen Year 2006, and chair of Dag og Tid from 2005.

== Publications ==
Mestad has authored and co-authored several works on legal history and constitutional law, including:

- Rett, nasjon, union. Den svensk-norske unionens rettslige historie 1814–1905 (with Dag Michalsen, 2005)
- Anton Martin Schweigaard. Professorpolitikeren (2009)
