= Torill Ø. Hanssen =

Norwegian politician (born 1955)

Torill Øyunn Hanssen (born 22 September 1955) is a Norwegian politician for the Progress Party.

She served as a deputy representative to the Parliament of Norway from Nordland during the terms 1989–1993, 2001–2005 and 2005–2009. In total she met during 125 days of parliamentary session. From Mo i Rana, she was elected in the municipal council and later to Nordland county council from 2001.
