= Knut Petter Torgersen =

Norwegian politician (born 1955)

Knut Petter Torgersen (born 7 September 1955) is a Norwegian politician for the Labour Party.

He served as a deputy representative to the Parliament of Norway from Nordland during the terms 2005–2009 and 2009–2013. In total he met during 228 days of parliamentary session.

He has been a member of Nordland county council.
