= Morten Harg =

Norwegian politician (born 1955)

Morten Gudleiv Harg (born 5 December 1955) is a Norwegian politician for the Conservative Party.

He served as a deputy representative to the Norwegian Parliament from Akershus during the term 1981–1985. He was also a member of Bærum municipal council in the 1980s.

He has worked in several advertising agencies; as senior consultant in JBR, chief executive in DMB&B and director in BBDO Norway. He has also been a district leader in the Norwegian Home Guard.
