= Athletics at the 2007 Summer Universiade – Men's half marathon =

The men's half marathon event at the 2007 Summer Universiade was held on 11 August.

== Results ==
Rank	Name	Nationality	Time	Notes
1st place, gold medalist(s)	Mohamed Fadil	Morocco	1:05:49	SB
2nd place, silver medalist(s)	Najim El Gady	Morocco	1:06:04	
3rd place, bronze medalist(s)	Takashi Toyoda	Japan	1:06:30	
4	Brahim Chettah	Algeria	1:06:47	
5	Sota Kato	Japan	1:07:00	
6	David Marus	Uganda	1:07:31	
7	Chang Chia-che	Chinese Taipei	1:07:52	
8	Daliso Nkambule	Zimbabwe	1:09:30	
9	Paul Barno	Kenya	1:10:27	
10	Rolf Rüfenacht	Switzerland	1:10:52	
11	Boonthung Srisung	Thailand	1:11:52	
12	Jorge Rivera	Mexico	1:12:15	
13	Um Hyo-suk	South Korea	1:12:41	
14	Joseph McAlister	Ireland	1:12:44	
15	Gilbert Chirchir Kiptum	Uganda	1:15:05	
16	Thomas Madsen	Denmark	1:15:10	
17	Gi Ka Man	Hong Kong	1:16:17	
18	Francis Yiga	Uganda	1:16:36	
19	Quissai Mohamed Hassan	Iraq	1:16:42	
20	Sutat Kallayanakitti	Thailand	1:21:32	
21	Ramchandra Joshi	Nepal	1:22:50	PB
22	Jamal Al-Hinai	Oman	1:23:04	
23	Phurba Gyeltshen	Bhutan	1:31:10	
	Jaber Al-Shabibi	Oman	DNF	
	Abdelaziz Azzouzi	Morocco	DNF	
