= Anders Fjelstad =

Norwegian politician

Anders Fjelstad (10 October 1879 – 1955) was a Norwegian politician for the Centre Party, then called Bondepartiet (The Farmers' Party). He was consultative councillor of state 1940–1943 in the exile Nygaardsvold's Cabinet.
