= 1955 Norwegian local elections =

== Result of municipal elections ==
Results of the 1955 municipal elections.

Party	Votes	%	Seats
Labour Party	696,411	43.39	6,735
Upolitiske, lokale og andre lister	113,997	7.10	2,178
Farmers' Party	110,905	6.91	1,618
Conservative Party	268,172	16.71	1,362
Liberal Party	135,623	8.45	1,323
Borgerlige felleslister	68,861	4.29	1,181
Christian Democratic Party	119,376	7.44	1,063
Communist Party	84,875	5.29	519
Småbrukere, arbeidere og fiskere	6,603	0.41	110
Total	1,604,823	100.00	16,089
Registered voters/turnout	2,272,639	–	
Source: Élections en 1955 pour les conseils communaux et municipaux
