= Brit Dyrnes =

Norwegian ceramist

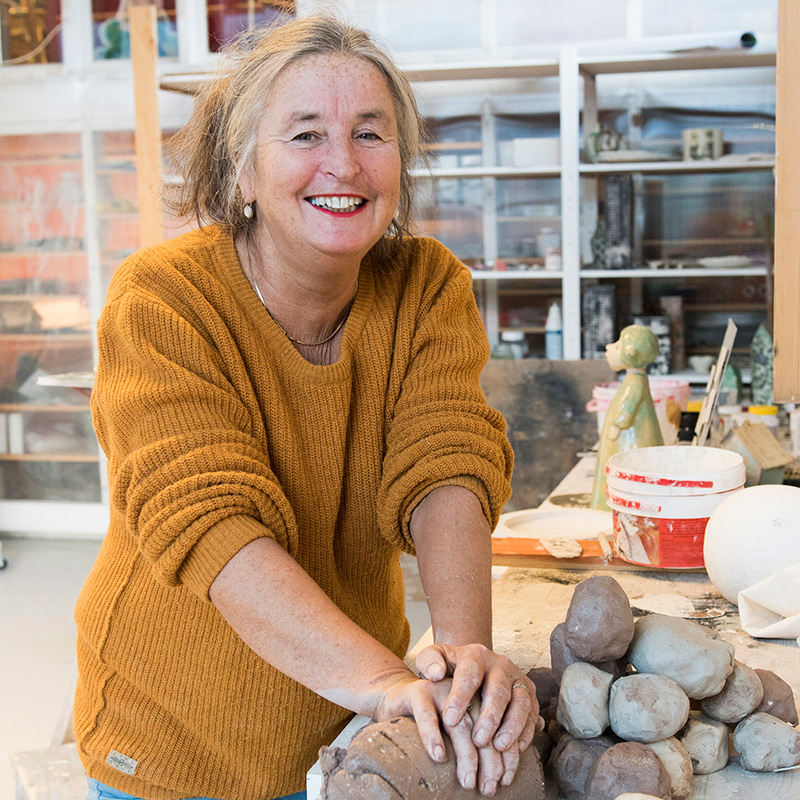
- Brit Dyrnes (2019)
- Born: 16 April 1955 (age 71)

Brit Dyrnes (born 16 April 1955) is a Norwegian artisan who has worked mainly as a ceramist. After completing her education at the State Academy of Fine Arts Stuttgart, she ran a workshop in Esslingen until 1982. She then returned to Norway where she has worked in Trondheim and Surnadal. Though her involvement in several pertinent organizations, in recent years she has motivated activity in arts and crafts in Norway and beyond. In 2019, she received the honorary award from Norske Kunsthåndverkere (NK, the Norwegian association for arts and crafts).

== Early life ==
Born in Trondheim on 16 April 1955, Brit Dyrnes was educated at Trondheim's art school Kunstskolen (1972), the Trondheim Academy of Fine Art (1974–78) and the Fine Arts Academy in Stuttgart (1978–79).

== Caree r ==
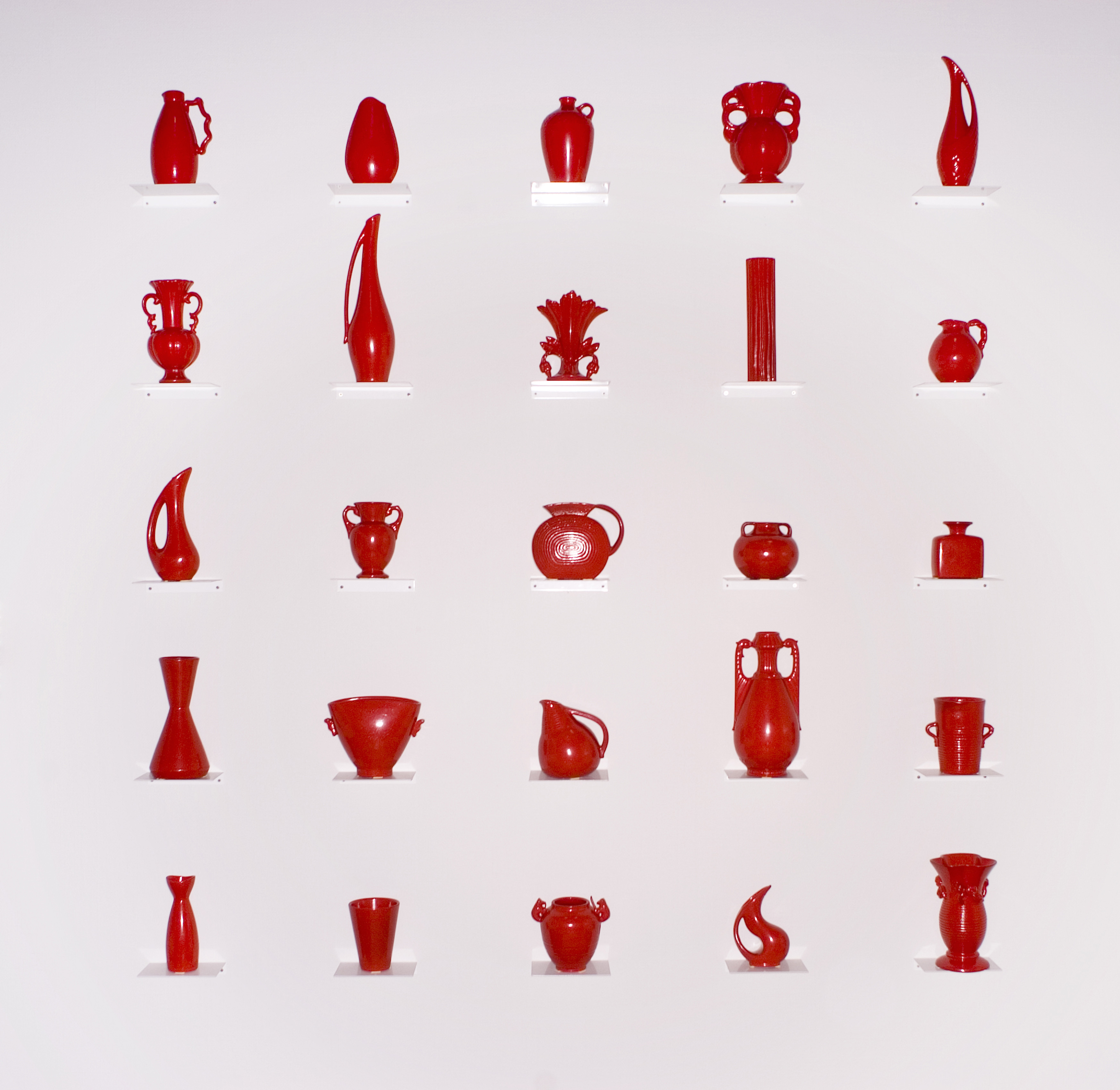
Rode vaser (Red Vases)

On completing her education in Stuttgart, she opened a workshop in nearby Esslingen which she ran from 1979 to 1982. She then returned to Norway where has worked since 1982, first in her workshop in Trondheim and since 2019 in Kvenna Kunstverksted, Surnadal, where she has her own studio. Her work is difficult to classify as she moves from one style to another, sometimes inspired by tradition, sometimes experimenting with her own imagination, as for her Rode vaser (Red Vases, 2001), a collection of 25 vases on white plates arranged five side by side and five from top to bottom. While she has principally worked with clay, inspired by the work of Antoni Gaudí in 1984 she began to work with brick.

Dyrnes's work has benefited from her collaboration with a number of artists and craftsman, including the sculptor Erland Leirdal (born 1964), the landscape architect Christine Gjermo (born 1961) and the photographer Arild Juul.

She has emphasized how important it is for her to support and strengthen the role of Norwegian artisans. In this connection she has been a driving force in a number of organizations, including Norske Kunsthåndverkere (serving as regional leader for central Norway), and as a board member of Trøndelag Centre for Contemporary Art and Ytre Art School in Ålesund.

== Awards ==
As a result of her efforts, Brit Dyrnes received the Norske Kunsthåndverkere honorary award for 2019.
