= Peter Madsen (disambiguation) =

Peter Madsen (born 1971) is a convicted murderer and Danish entrepreneur.

Peter Madsen may also refer to:

- Mick Madsen (Peter Madsen, 1900–1979), Australian rugby league footballer
- Peter Madsen (cartoonist) (born 1958), Danish cartoonist
- Peter Madsen (footballer) (born 1978), Danish international footballer
- Peter Madsen (pianist) (born 1955), American jazz pianist
