= Norwegian Society of Psychological Science =

- Psykologiforbundet
- Abbreviation: NSPS
- Type: Non-profit association
- Purpose: To promote, protect, and advance the interests of scientifically oriented psychology
- Location: Norway
- Main organ: Scandinavian Psychologist
- Affiliations: Association for Psychological Science
- Website: Official website

The Norwegian Society for Psychological Science (Norwegian: Psykologiforbundet; NSPS) is a non-profit association for scientists and students in psychology in Norway. Its mission is to promote, protect, and advance the interests of scientifically oriented psychology. The society is a co-founder of the open-access journal Scandinavian Psychologist. The society has international collaborations with the Association for Psychological Science and the British Psychological Society.

The NSPS is responsible for the Innovation of the Year in Psychological Science award (Årets Nyvinning). The aim is to stimulate innovation in the field of psychological science. The Innovators of 2014 and 2015 were Greenudge and the OCD-team at Haukeland University Hospital.
