= Cerro Madsen =

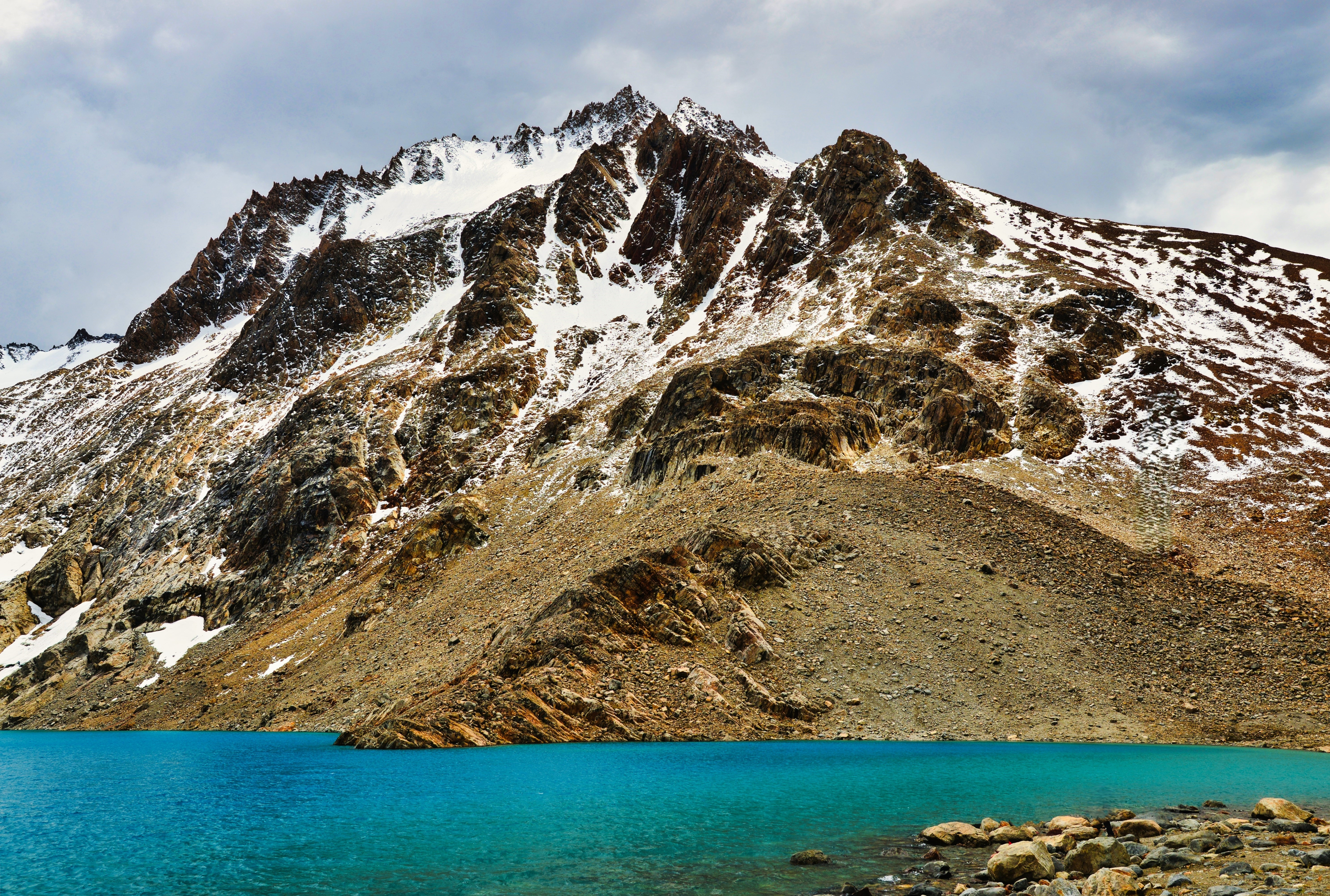
- Southeast aspect

Highest point
- Elevation: 1,806 m (5,925 ft)
- Prominence: 238 m (781 ft)
- Parent peak: Fitz Roy
- Isolation: 1.255 km (0.780 mi)
- Coordinates: 49°16′10″S 72°59′32″W

Naming
- Etymology: Andreas Madsen

Geography
- Location within Argentina Location within South America Location within Southern Patagonia
- Interactive map of Cerro Madsen
- Country: Argentina
- Province: Santa Cruz
- Protected area: Los Glaciares National Park
- Parent range: Andes
- Topo map: IGN 4769‑III El Chaltén

Cerro Madsen is a mountain in Santa Cruz Province, Argentina.

== Description ==
Cerro Madsen is an 1,806-meter-elevation (5,925-foot) summit in the Andes. The peak is located 3.5 kilometers (2.2 miles) east of Fitz Roy and 10 kilometers (6 miles) northwest of El Chaltén, in Los Glaciares National Park of Patagonia. Topographic relief is significant as the summit rises 1,150 meters (3,773 ft) above Laguna Piedras Blancas in 1.5 kilometers (0.93 mile), and 635 meters (2,083 ft) above Lago de los Tres in 0.75 kilometer (0.46 mile). Precipitation runoff from the mountain's slopes drains to Viedma Lake. The toponym was applied by Louis Lliboutry in 1952 to honor Andreas Madsen (1881–1965), a pioneer settler in this area with his ranch called Estancia Cerro Fitz Roy. The nearest higher peak is Punta Velluda, one kilometer (0.6 mile) to the west.

== Climate ==
According to the Köppen climate classification system, Cerro Madsen is located in a tundra climate zone with cold, snowy winters, and cool summers. Weather systems are forced upward by the mountains (orographic lift), causing moisture to drop in the form of rain and snow. This climate supports the Piedras Blancas Glacier below the north slope of the peak, and the Glaciar de los Tres to the southwest. The months of November through February offer the most favorable weather for visiting or climbing this peak.

== Gallery ==
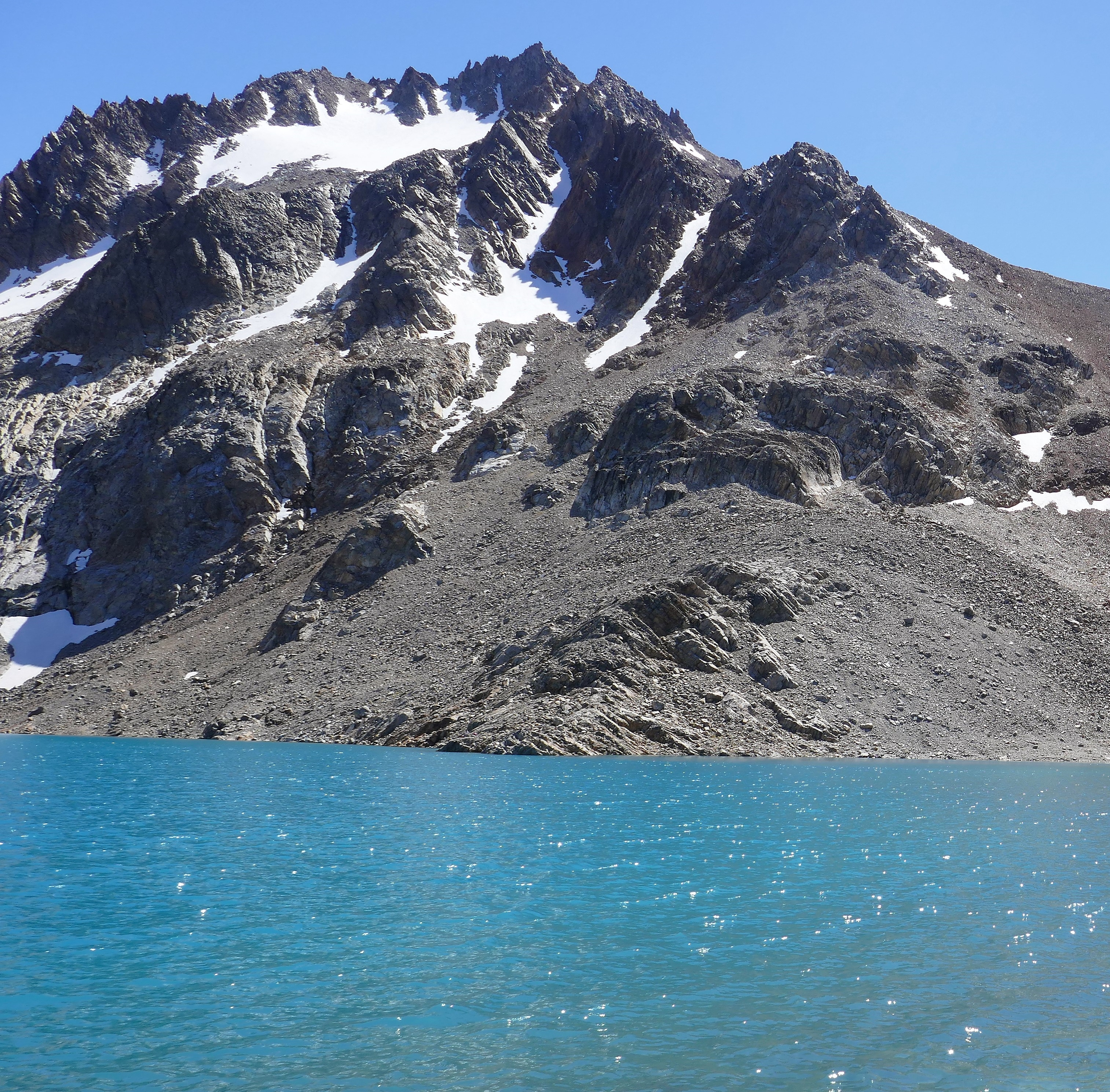
Cerro Madsen from Lago de los Tres

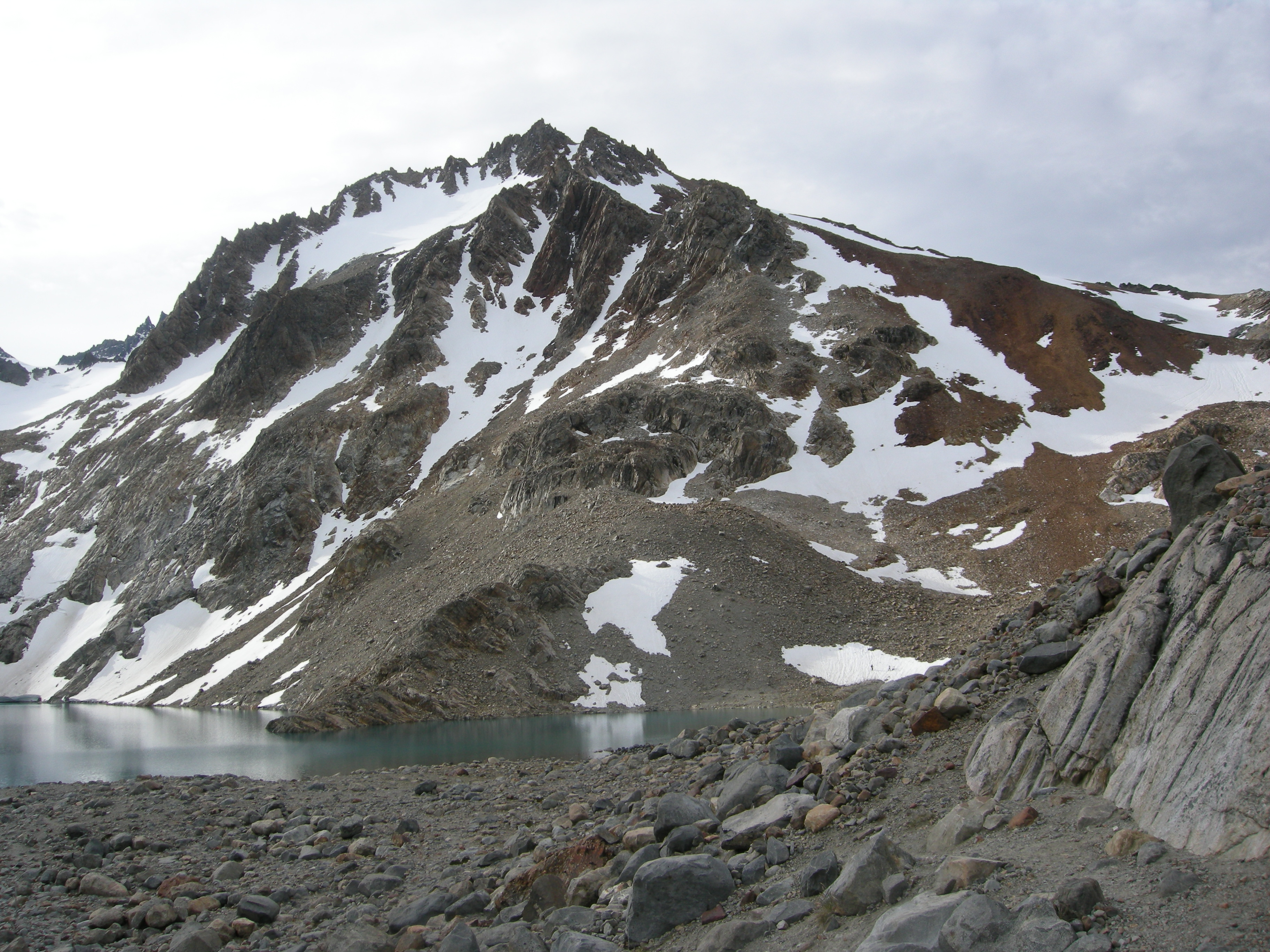
Cerro Madsen from southeast

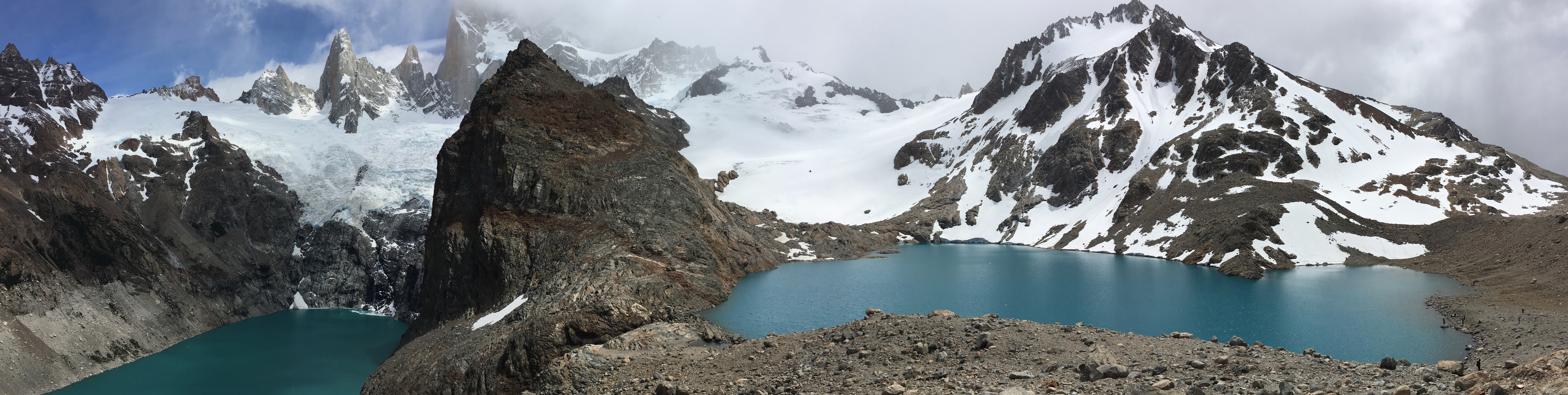
Cerro Madsen to right, behind Lago de los Tres

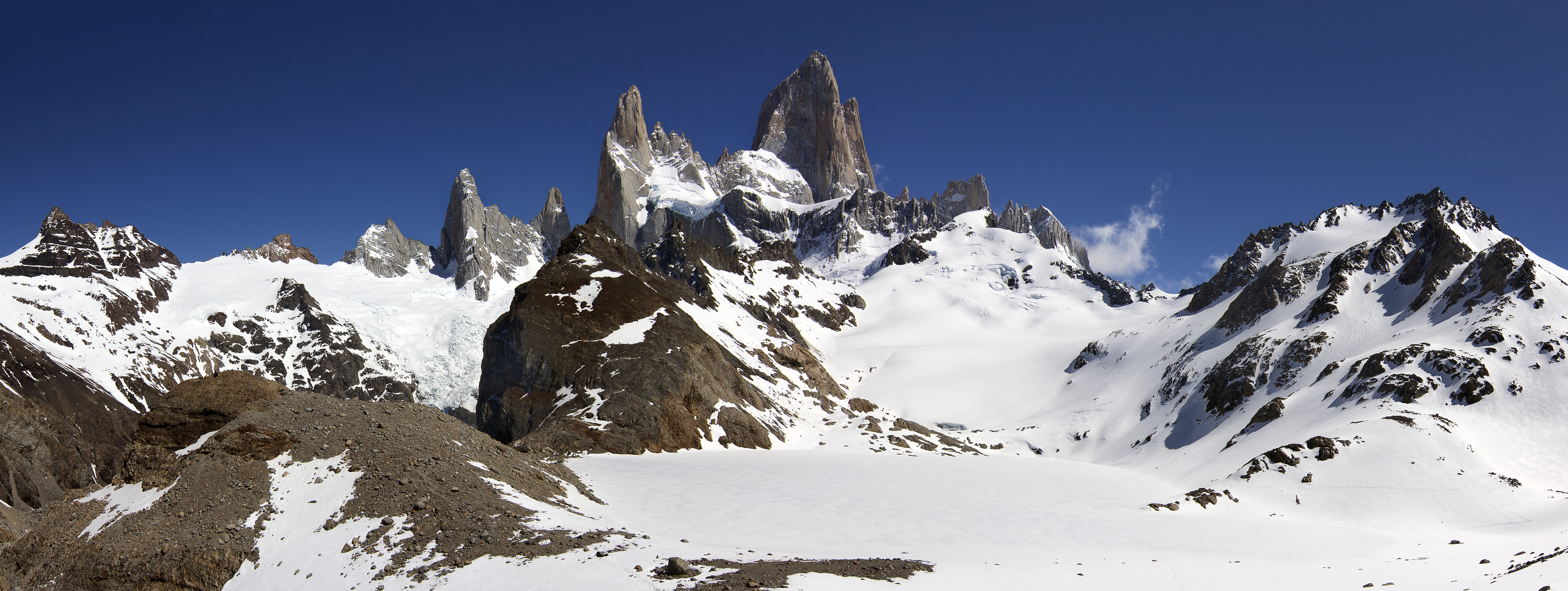
Cerro Madsen at right edge. Aguja Poincenot and Fitz Roy centered.

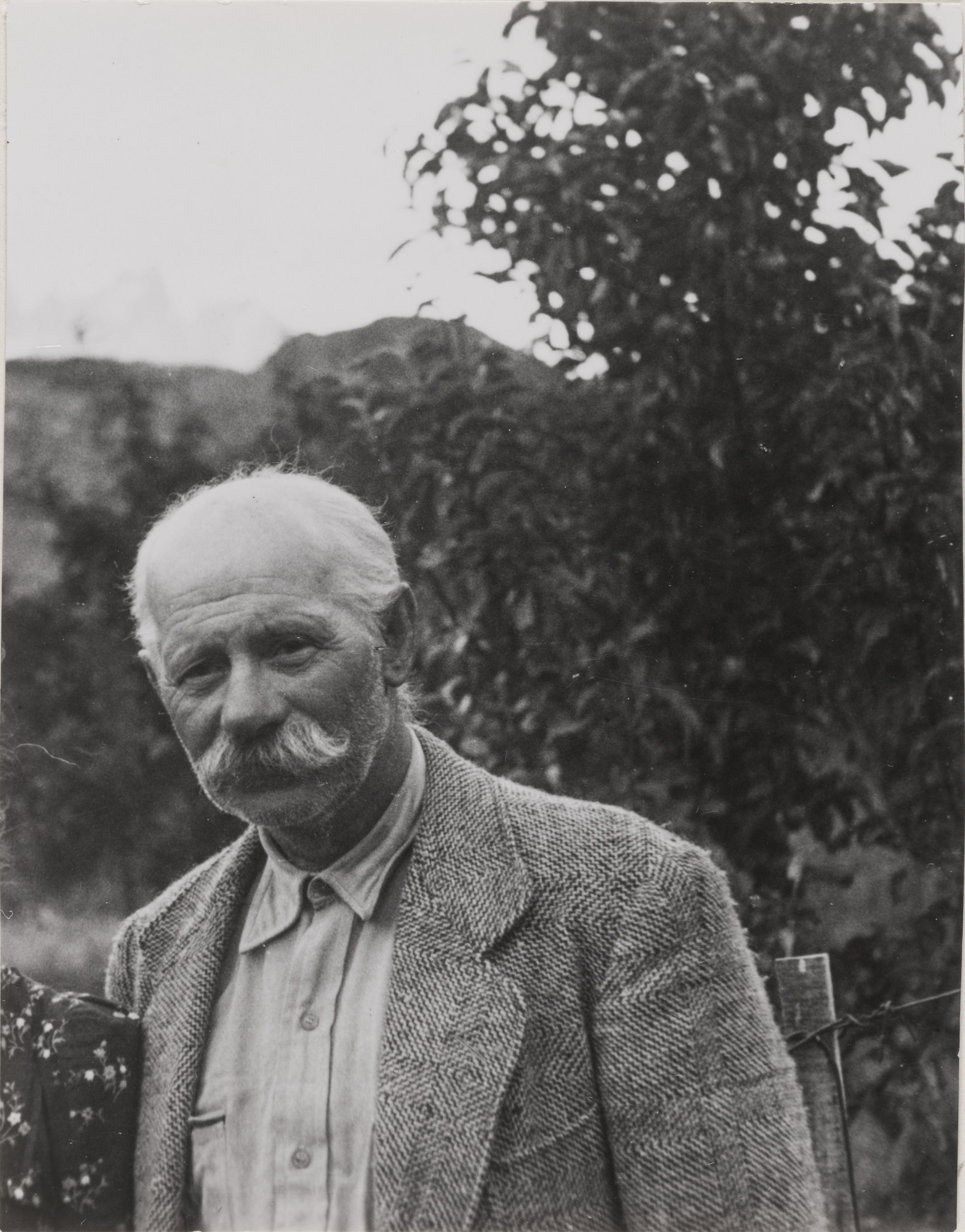
Andreas Madsen in 1946

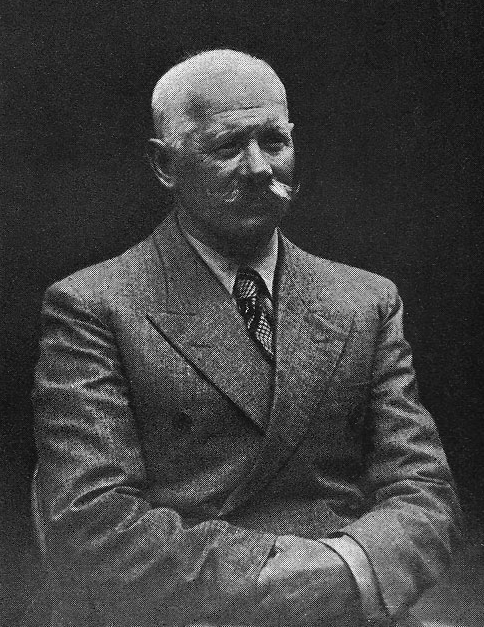
Andreas Madsen

== See also ==
- List of mountains in Argentina
