= Gerd Kvale =

Norwegian professor of psychology

- Born: 1955 (age 70–71)
- Education: University of Bergen
- Occupation: Psychologist

Gerd Kvale (born 1955) is a Norwegian psychologist working on obsessive–compulsive disorder.

She graduated as a Candidate of Psychology from the University of Bergen in 1982, and completed her Ph.D. in psychology in 1992. She was appointed professor in clinical psychology at the University of Bergen in 2002. Since 2011 she has been leading an Obsessive–Compulsive Disorder (OCD) project at the Haukeland University Hospital in Bergen. In 2015 she and her team received the Innovation of the Year in Psychological Science award from the Norwegian Society of Psychological Science.

In 2018 she was featured in Time magazine, along with Bjarne Hansen, due to their successful four-day exposure therapy program which treats obsessive–compulsive disorder.

== The Bergen 4-Day Treatment (B4DT) ==
In 2009, Kvale established an evidence-based outpatient OCD clinic at the Haukeland University Hospital, when she was awarded two years of sabbatical by the University of Bergen. The clinic focused on providing concentrated treatments for patients. After two years, the hospital extended this project.

Kvale invited Bjarne Hansen in 2011, who was then heading the inpatient OCD clinic at St. Olav’s Hospital in Trondheim, Norway, to join the clinic. Kvale and Hansen worked together to improve the treatment of OCD and the distribution of the treatment.

Since 2012, the team has developed an intensive exposure-based treatment method for patients with OCD, known as the Bergen 4-day treatment (B4DT). Over the course of four consecutive days, patients with OCD undergo personalized and therapist-assisted exposure therapy within a group format, maintaining a 1:1 patient-to-therapist ratio. This method is highly appealing to patients and experiences virtually no dropouts.
