= Michael Madsen (disambiguation) =

Michael Madsen (1957–2025) was an American actor.

Michael Madsen may also refer to:

- Michael Madsen (boxer) (born 1958), Danish boxer
- Michael Madsen (ice hockey) (born 1980), Danish ice hockey goaltender
- Michael Madsen (footballer) (born 1974), Danish football player and manager
- Michael Madsen, Danish director of the film Into Eternity and The Visit

== See also ==
- Mick Madsen (1901–1979), Australian rugby league player
