= Anne Odenmarck =

Norwegian politician (born 1955)

Anne Odenmarck (born 7 July 1955) is a Norwegian politician for the Labour Party.

She served as a deputy representative to the Parliament of Norway from Akershus during the term 2013–2017. She has led the Labour caucus in Ås municipal council since 1991 and been a member of Akershus county council.
