= Torvald Tu =

Norwegian writer

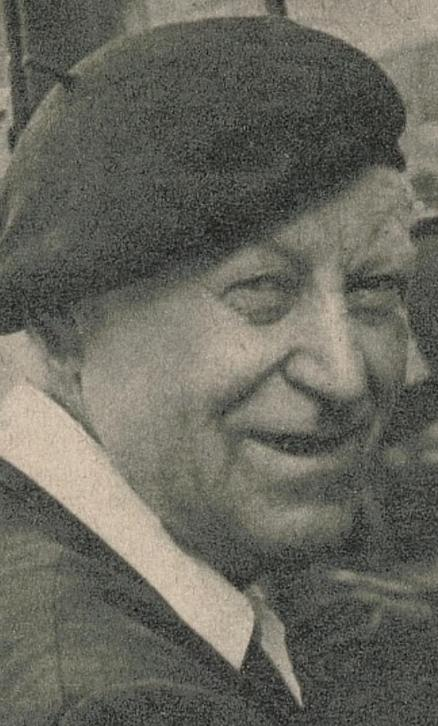
Tu around 1950

Torvald Tu (22 July 1893 – 15 January 1955) was a Norwegian poet, playwright, novelist and writer of humoresques.

He was born in Klepp Municipality as a son of farmers. His literary debut was the 1914 play Storbrekkmyri, and his first poetry collection Blomar fraa heid came in 1915. He wrote in Nynorsk with strong hints of his own Jæren dialect. His most successful play was the musical comedy Kjærleik på Lykteland, issued in 1923 and staged at Det Norske Teatret. The play had music composed by Per Reidarson, and was produced by Agnes Mowinckel, with Lars Tvinde as the elder bachelor, and Mally Haaland portraying the anxious-to-be-married Anna Saueland. The play was one of the greatest successes for Det Norske Teatret, and simultaneously went on two parallel tours. In 1929 Tu's comedy Friarleik på Liland, with music by Trygve Stangeland, was staged at Det Norske Teatret. His comedy Bertels gjenvordigheter, was played 133 times in 1933 at Komedieteatret in Bergen, which also staged several others of his plays. His works became very popular at Nynorsk amateur theatres throughout the country.

In total he issued over fifty books, and some works have been translated to other languages, notably Swedish and Faroese. He also contributed to newspapers and magazines. His song Sjå Jæren, gamle Jæren has later achieved status as a "national" song for the Jæren district, and his popular humoresques have seen new and increasing popularity in later years. After the German occupation of Norway ended in 1945, a minor controversy arose as Tu was admonished by the Norwegian Authors' Union for not following the union policy to "strike" during the occupation—Tu had released four titles in 1943.

From 1937 he lived with musician Trygve Johannes Stangeland (1898–1969). They also cooperated professionally on many occasions. Tu died in January 1955 near his home.
