= Vibeke Hammer Madsen =

Norwegian businessperson (born 1955)

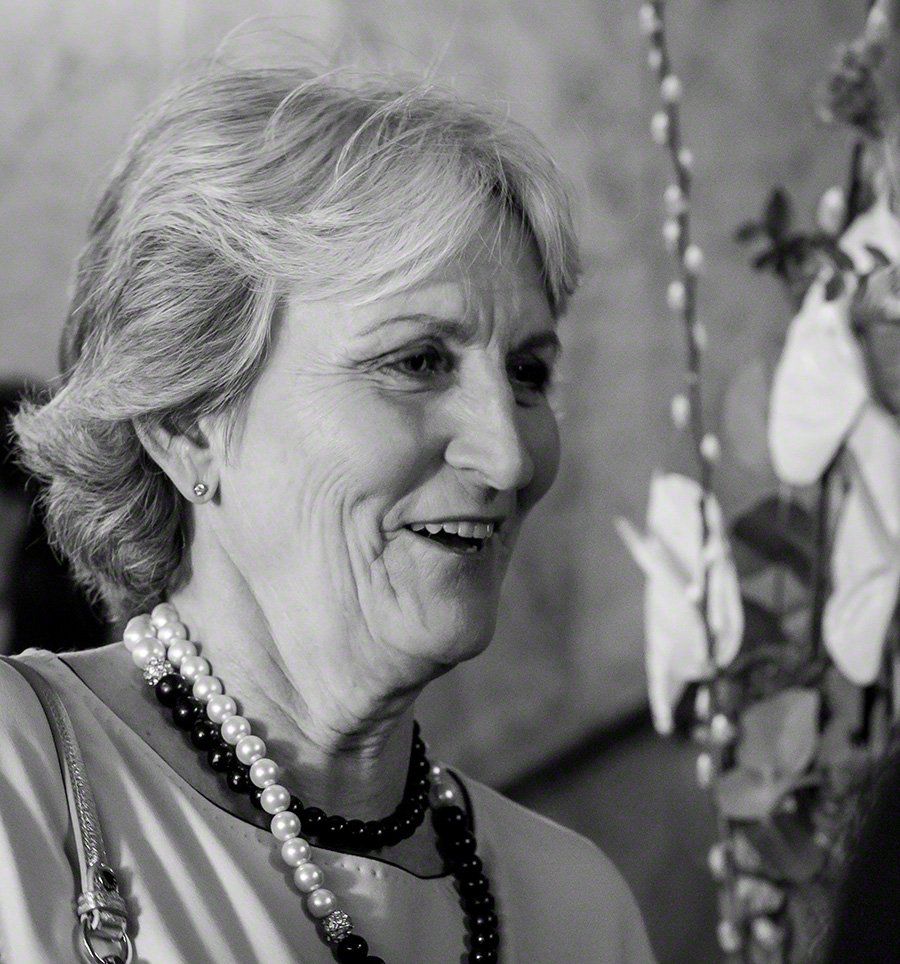
Madsen in 2016

Vibeke Hammer Madsen (born 27 October 1955) is a Norwegian businessperson.

She is the CEO of the Federation of Norwegian Commercial and Service Enterprises since 2002. Educated at the Norwegian School of Radiography, she worked in Statoil from 1993 to 1999 and in PA Consulting Group from 1999 to 2002.

She has been a member of the board of Aker Solutions.
