= Gislaved (tires) =

Swedish tire manufacturer

Continental Gislaved
- Company type: Public
- Industry: Manufacturing
- Founded: Sweden
- Products: Tires
- Owner: Continental AG
- Website: www.gislaved-tyres.com

Continental Gislaved (formerly just Gislaved) is a Swedish manufacturer of rubber tires. Until 1980, Gislaved produced tires for cars and trucks, today only for passenger cars (including SUVs).

== History ==
Gislaved was a Swedish car tire manufacturer. Gislaved was formed in 1893 when the brothers Carl and Wilhelm Gislow started manufacturing rubber products in the municipality of Gislaved. The company's first products were balls and galoshes. In 1904, Gislow's factory began to produce bicycle tires, and in 1905 a car tire was released. The production of the first tire took a whole day, the work was personally supervised by General Director Wilhelm Gislow.

The first Gislaved car tires were not durable. The carcass of the tires used several layers of textile fibers without rubber layers between them. Such tires quickly collapsed. In 1912, company management went to Stockholm to watch the Olympics. They took a few spare tires with them. The last one broke down on the way back, the car did not even have time to return home to Norrköping. Because of this, it was decided to suspend tire production until a more reliable design was found.

Tire production was resumed, in 1926. The new design used layers of cotton thread cord separated from each other by a layer of rubber. These tires were called Gislaved Nord, and the novelty did not go unnoticed. In 1927, Gislaved began supplying factory tires for Volvo cars. As a result, Gislaved's daily tire shipments increased by more than 25 times. Gislaved tires became even more advanced after a technical know-how agreement was signed with US Rubber Company (these days Uniroyal tire brand) in 1938.

In 1985, Gislaved began to cooperate with the Norwegian tire manufacturer Viking Tyres. The following year, the companies merged under the name Nivis Tyre AB with headquarters in Gothenburg. In 1991, Viking closed its factory in Axim, and the tire company Continental AG bought a 49% stake in Nivis Tyre AB.

A year later, Continental AG buys the remaining part of Nivis Tyre AB. For the first time, the production of Gislaved and Viking tires continues in Sweden and Norway, respectively. However, in 2002, owner decides to close the historical production in Gislaved. Current production is in France, Slovakia, Romania, Portugal.

The Gislaved brand is today used by Continental AG for products developed for the Swedish, Canadian, German, Spanish, Italian and Nordic markets. It still in 2024 uses its name on production in Russian factories.
