= Ingjerd Hanevold =

Norwegian designer of jewellery (born 1955)

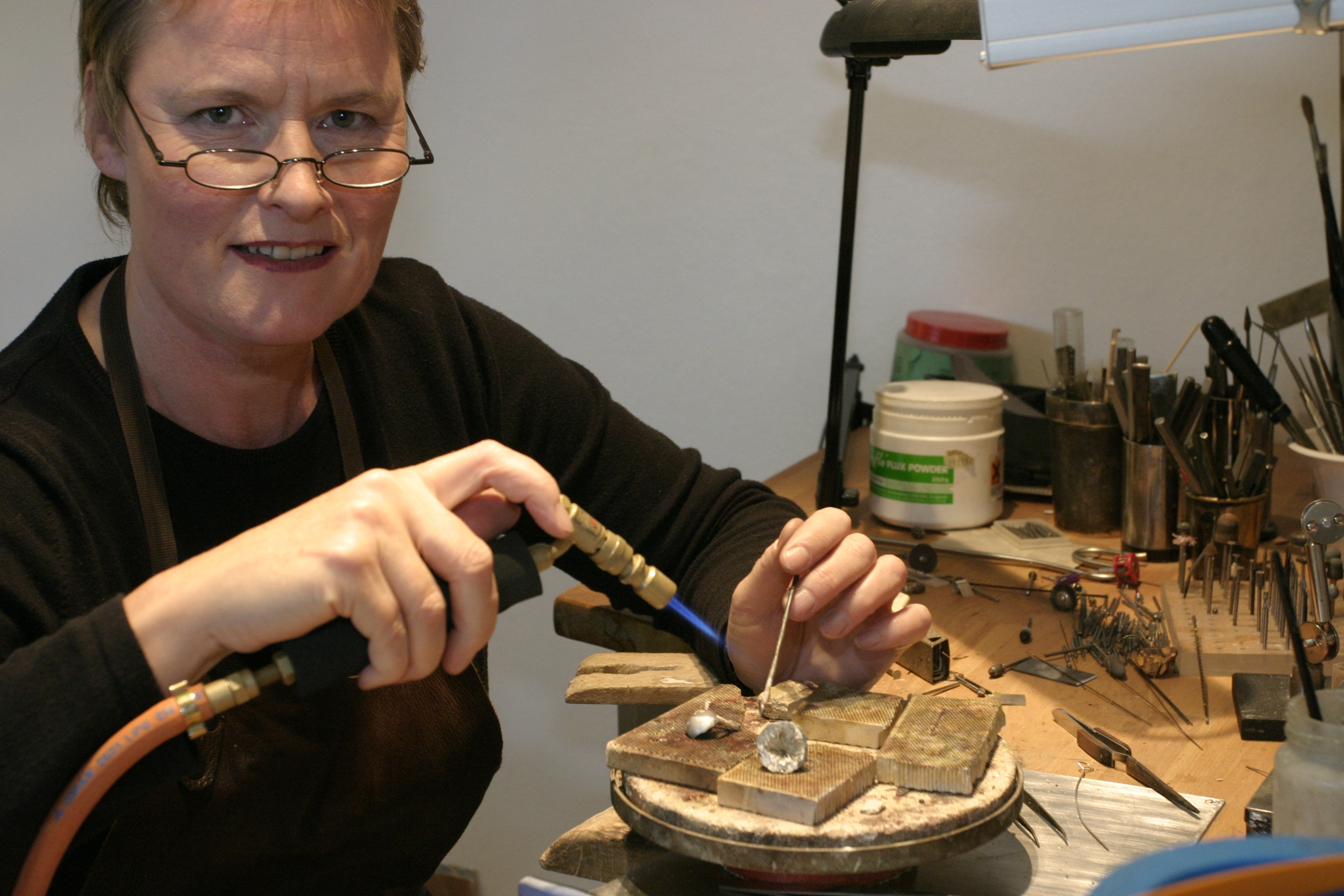
- Born: 30 March 1955 (age 71); Asker, Norway
- Occupation: Designer
- Notable work: Olympic medals for the 1994 Winter Olympics

Ingjerd Hanevold (born 30 March 1955) is a Norwegian designer of jewellery, born in Asker. Among her works is the design of the Olympic medals for the 1994 Winter Olympics. She was appointed professor at the Oslo National Academy of the Arts from 1998.
