= 1960 in Norway =

- Centuries: 18th; 19th; 20th; 21st
- Decades: 1940s; 1950s; 1960s; 1970s; 1980s
- See also: List of years in Norway

Events in the year 1960 in Norway.

== Incumbents ==
- Monarch – Olav V.
- Prime Minister – Einar Gerhardsen (Labour Party)

== Events ==
- 1 May – The U-2 incident reveals that the United States uses Norwegian air bases as part of spying missions against the Soviet Union.
- 20 August – King Olav V declares television officially opened in Norway.
- 6 October – The Akershus University Hospital opens
- 1 November – Population Census: 3,591,234 inhabitants in Norway.
- 9 December – The Norwegian government decides, contrary to the advice of the Norwegian military leadership, that Norway will not acquire any nuclear weapons.
- NRK began its regular television broadcasts.

== Popular culture ==
=== Sports ===
- 1960 in Norwegian football
- Norway at the 1960 Summer Olympics
- Norway at the 1960 Winter Olympics

=== Film ===
- Struggle for Eagle Peak (Venner), starring Alf Malland

=== Literature ===
- Jens Bjørneboe - Den onde hyrde

== Notable births ==
=== January to June ===
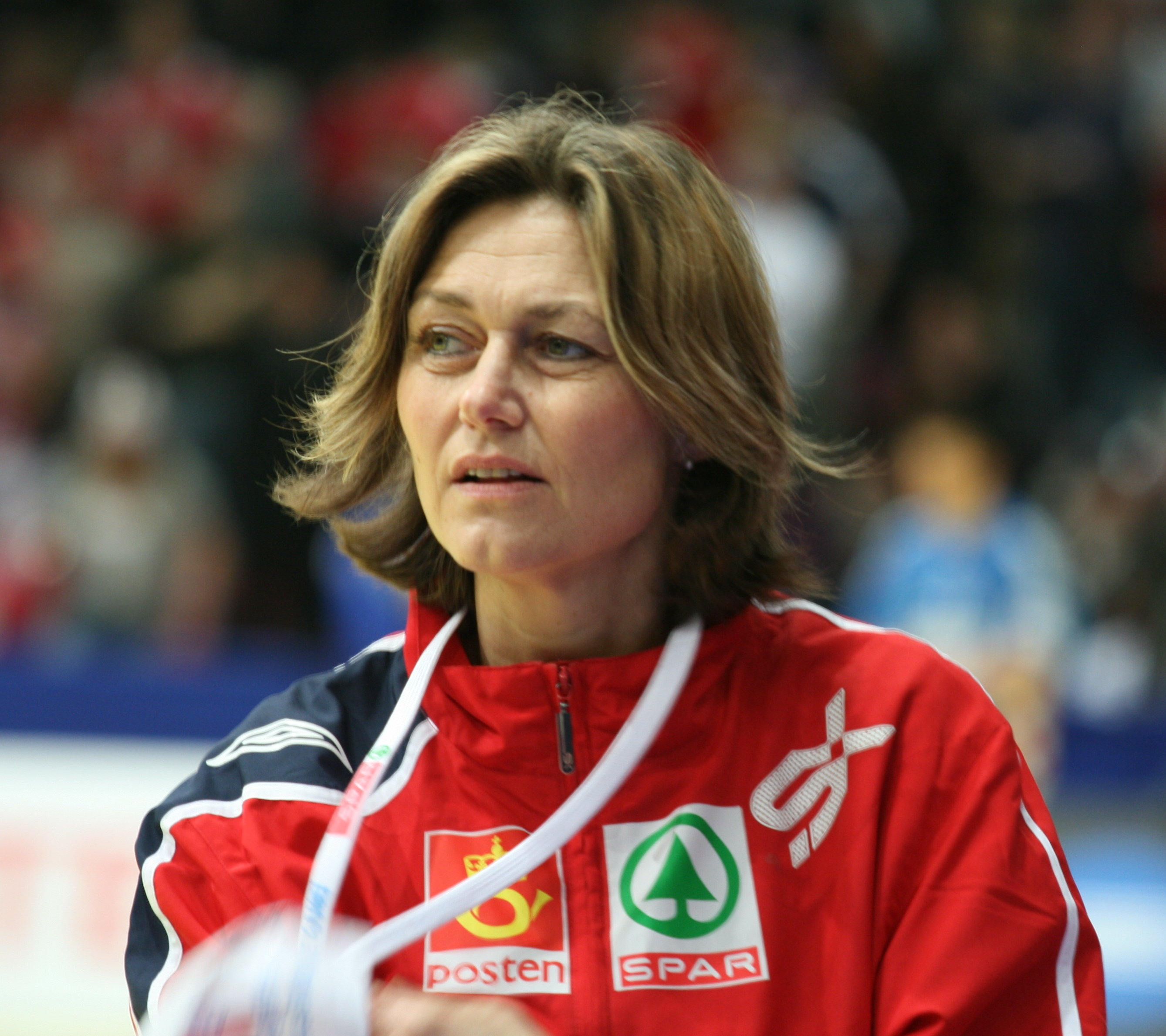
Hanne Hegh in 2008

- 17 January – Vivian Knarvik Bugge, politician.
- 7 February – Ingunn Foss, politician
- 2 March – Svein Stølen, chemist.
- 10 March – Agnete Haaland, actress and theatre director.
- 19 March – Hanne Woods, curler.
- 21 March – Gunn Nyborg, footballer.
- 29 March
  - Sonja Mandt-Bartholsen, politician.
  - Jo Nesbø, novelist and musician.
- 4 April – Brit Volden, orienteering competitor.
- 8 April – Jørn Sigurd Maurud, jurist and civil servant.
- 27 April – Hanne Hegh, handball player.
- 25 June – Randi Karlstrøm, politician
- 26 June – Rigmor Aasrud, politician

=== July to December ===
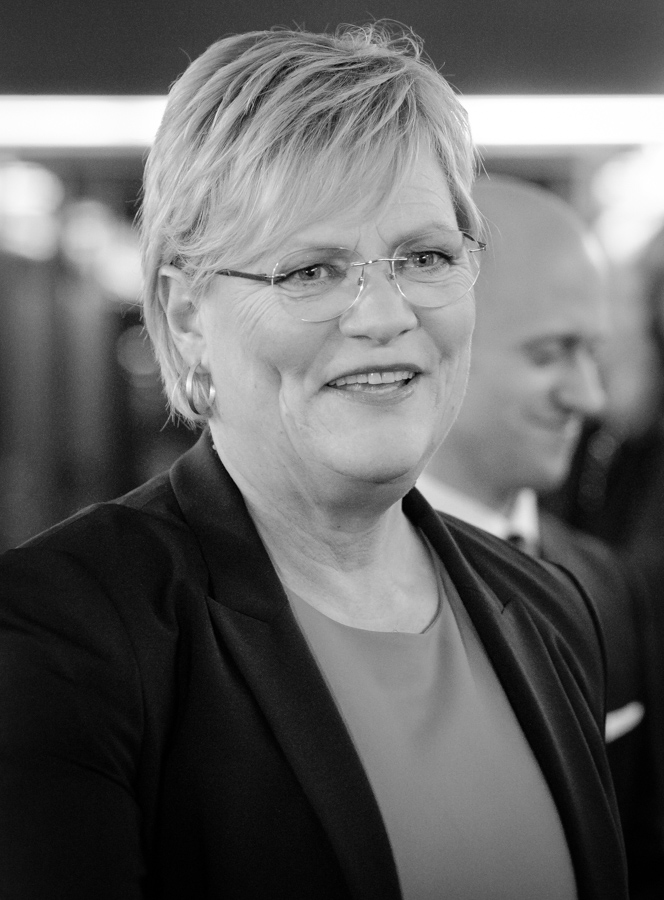
Kristin Halvorsen

- 16 July – Trond Abrahamsen, ice hockey player.
- 17 July – Toril Marie Øie, Chief Justice of the Supreme Court of Norway.
- 21 July – Brynjar Aa, dramatist
- 27 July – Sverre Løken, rower.
- 2 August – Joar Vaadal, footballer.
- 10 August – Øystein Alme, author
- 2 September – Kristin Halvorsen, politician and Minister
- 2 September – Ida Hjort Kraby, civil servant.
- 2 September – Vetle Lid Larssen, journalist and novelist.
- 4 September – Ragnhild Aarflot Kalland, politician
- 18 September – Nils Petter Molvær, jazz trumpeter, composer and producer
- 1 October – Per Bergersen, musician (died 1990)
- 26 October – Arne Berggren, writer and musician.
- 18 December – Niels Christian Geelmuyden, journalist and writer
- 11 December – Frode Grytten, writer and journalist
- 20 December – Morten Haga Lunde, air force general.

== Notable deaths ==
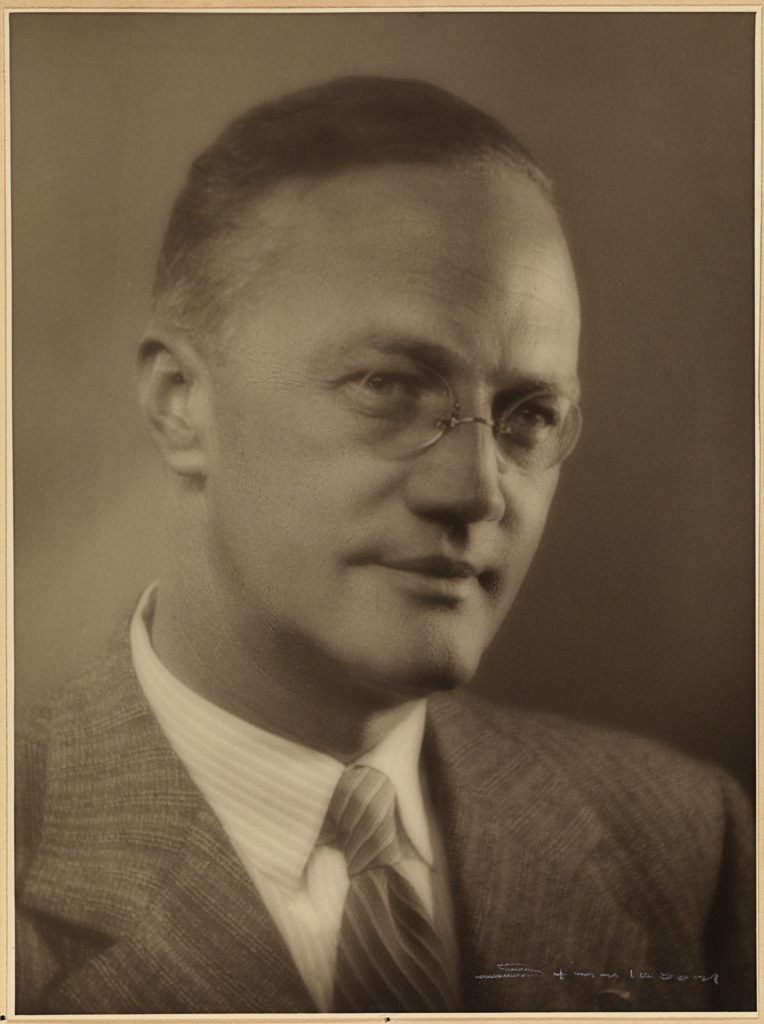
Sigurd Hoel in 1950

- 15 January – Carl Fredrik Holmboe, engineer (b. 1882)
- 2 February – Eilert Falch-Lund, sailor and Olympic gold medallist (b. 1875)
- 15 May – Rolf Jacobsen, boxer (b. 1899)
- 22 May – Anders Tjøstolvsen Noddeland, politician (b. 1885)
- 25 June – Carl Alfred Pedersen, gymnast and triple jumper (b. 1882)
- 22 July
  - Bodil Katharine Biørn, missionary known as Mother Katharine (b. 1871)
  - Hans Nordvik, rifle shooter and Olympic gold medallist (b. 1880).
- 29 July – Kristian Østervold, sailor and Olympic gold medallist (b. 1885).
- 29 July – Carl Wilhelm Rubenson, mountaineer (born 1885 in Sweden).
- 12 September – Jakob Nilsson Vik, politician and Minister (b. 1882)
- 28 September – Gabriel Kielland, architect, painter and designer (b. 1871)
- 14 October – Sigurd Hoel, author and publishing consultant (b. 1890)
- 27 November – Gunnar Kaasen, musher, delivered diphtheria antitoxin to Nome, Alaska in 1925, as the last leg of a dog sled relay that saved the city from an epidemic (b. 1882)
- 13 December – Christopher Hornsrud, politician and Prime Minister of Norway (b. 1859)
- 13 December – Einar Jansen, historian, genealogist and archivist (b. 1893)
- 17 December – Arne Sejersted, sailor and Olympic gold medallist (b.1877).
- 18 December – Trygve Schjøtt, sailor and Olympic gold medallist (b.1882).
- 28 December – Karl Eugen Hammerstedt, politician (b.1903)

=== Full date missing ===
- Birger Gotaas, journalist (b. 1883).
