= Fritt Ord Award =

Norwegian free expression award

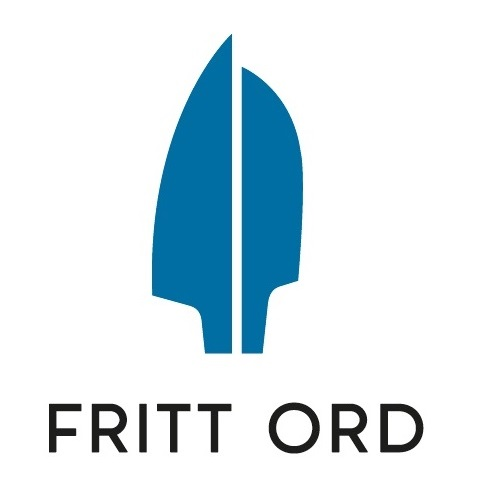
Fritt Ord logo, new

Fritt Ord Award consists of two prizes awarded by the Fritt Ord Foundation (Stiftelsen Fritt Ord). Two prizes are awarded in support of freedom of speech and freedom of expression; the Fritt Ord Award (Norwegian: Fritt Ords pris) and the Fritt Ord Honorary Award (Norwegian: Fritt Ords honnør). These are awards are distributed annually during the month of May in connection with the anniversary of the liberation of Norway at the end of World War II in May 1945.

Prizes are awarded to one or more persons or organizations that have contributed to areas where the organization works, especially in the work of freedom of expression. In addition to a monetary reward, the award includes a statue by sculptor Nils Aas.

Fritt Ord Foundation was founded on 7 June 1974 by Jens Henrik Nordlie (1910–1996) who was CEO of Narvesen from 1957 to 1975, corporate director Finn Skedsmo and jurist Jens Christian Hauge (1915–2006). The foundation was funded by Narvesen, the Norwegian based chain of convenience stores and news outlets.

== Fritt Ord Award ==
These are the laureates of the Fritt Ord Award:

- 1976: Johan Vogt.
- 1977: Henrik Groth.
- 1978: Kim Friele.
- 1979: Stein Mehren.
- 1980: Andrey Sakharov.
- 1982: Lech Wałęsa and Hallvard Rieber-Mohn.
- 1983: Kjetil Bang-Hansen.
- 1984: Nordnorsk forfatterlag.
- 1985: Den illegale presses forening.
- 1986: Magli Elster and Torolf Elster.
- 1987: Nansen Academy.
- 1988: Leo Eitinger.
- 1989: Erik Bye.
- 1990: Charter 77.
- 1991: Nordland Akademi for Kunst og Vitenskap.
- 1992: Annette Thommessen.
- 1993: Rolv Ryssdal.
- 1994: William Nygaard.
- 1995: Hanne Sophie Greve.
- 1996: Arne Skouen.
- 1997: Kåre Willoch.
- 1998: Alexander Nikitin.
- 1999: NRK P2.
- 2000: Thomas Chr. Wyller.
- 2001: Nils Christie.
- 2002: Aslam Ahsan and Shabana Rehman.
- 2003: Berge Furre.
- 2004: Unni Wikan.
- 2005: Nina Witoszek.
- 2006: Bjørgulv Braanen.
- 2007: Terje Tvedt.
- 2008: Per-Yngve Monsen.
- 2009: Nina Karin Monsen.
- 2010: Bushra Ishaq and Abid Q. Raja.
- 2011: Anders Sømme Hammer.
- 2012: Sara Azmeh Rasmussen.
- 2013: Per Fugelli.
- 2014: Anne Sender.
- 2015: Robin Schaefer and Jan Erik Skog.
- 2016: Robert Mood
- 2017: Dag og Tid.
- 2018: Harald Amdal, Eirik Linaker Berglund, Thor Harald Henriksen and Kenneth Hætta
- 2019: Natur og Ungdom and Greta Thunberg
- 2020: Deeyah Khan.
- 2021: Jan Grue, Bjørn Hatterud and Olaug Nilssen.
- 2022: Meduza.
- 2023: Julie Wilhelmsen.
- 2024: Harald Henden.
- 2025: May Linn Clement, Marvin Halleraker and Morten Mørland.
- 2026: Hilde Henriksen Waage.

== Fritt Ord Honorary Award ==
These are the laureates of the Fritt Ord Honorary Award:

- 1979 : Hans Heiberg
- 1980 : Philip Houm, Hermod Skånland, Anne Ma Ødegaard
- 1981 : none
- 1982 : Hans Børli
- 1983 : none
- 1984 : Arvid Hanssen, Lars Roar Langslet, Alf Steinsøy, Anne-Lisa Amadou
- 1985 : Johs. Andenæs, Carsten Smith, Dag Sørli
- 1986 : Åge Rønning, Odd Kvaal Pedersen, Radio Immigranten, Anders Bratholm
- 1987 : Petter Wessel Zapffe, Harald Tveterås, Birgitte Grimstad, Lillebjørn Nilsen
- 1988 : Barthelemy Niava
- 1989 : Hå Gamle Prestegard, Espevør Husmorlag, Thomas Thiis-Evensen
- 1990 : Jahn Thon, Egil Bakke, Edvard Beyer, Elisabeth Gording, Bestemødrene foran Stortinget, Sidsel Mørck
- 1991 : Stiftelsen Aur Prestegård
- 1992 : Odd Abrahamsen, Arquebus Krigshistorisk museum, Svein Ellingsen, Erik Hillestad, Egil Hovland
- 1993 : Jon Godal, Sverre Ødegaard, Arild Haaland, Dagmar Loe, Anne-May Nilsen
- 1994 : Carl Fredrik Thorsager, Helga Arntzen
- 1995 : Harald Noreng, Hans P.S. Knudsen
- 1996 : Kari Risvik, Kari Vogt, Christian Norberg-Schulz, Rune Slagstad, Cato Guhnfeldt, Axel Jensen, Knut Wigert
- 1997 : Nasa Borba
- 1998 : Kristin Brudevoll, Erik Damman, Ørnulf Ranheimsæter
- 1999 : Aldo Keel
- 2000 : Tor Bomann-Larsen, Hans Fredrik Dahl, Geir Hestmark, Geir Kjetsaa, Torill Steinfeld, Jan Otto Hauge, Reidar Hirsti, Ivan Kristoffersen, Arve Solstad, Kadra Yusuf
- 2001 : Åsne Seierstad
- 2002 : Ottar Brox, Åge Hovengen
- 2003 : Willy A. Kirkeby
- 2004 : Kristian Ottosen
- 2005 : Trygve Refsdal, Hermund Slaattelid
- 2006 : Tom Martinsen
- 2007 : Janet Garton, Ljubiša Rajić, Ebba Haslund, Sissel Benneche Osvold, Niels Christian Geelmuyden
- 2008 : Arnhild Lauveng
- 2009 : Else Michelet, Erik Fosse, Mads Gilbert
- 2010 : Harald Eia, Dag O. Hessen, Bjørn Vassnes
- 2011 : Odd S. Lovoll
- 2012 : Simon Flem Devold, Louiza Louhibi, Nina Johnsrud
- 2013 : Per Edgar Kokkvold, Nils E. Øy
- 2015 : Fredens Ring, Flemming Rose, Vebjørn Selbekk
- 2016 : Walid al-Kubaisi and Loveleen Rihel Brenna
- 2017 : Leo Ajkic, "The Shameless Girls" (represented by Amina Bile, Nancy Herz and Sofia Srour), Kristin Clemet
- 2018 : Simon Malkenes (May), Odd Isungset (October)
- 2019 : Levi Fragell, Hans Fredrik Dahl, Frank Nervik, Norun Haugen, Ola Waagen and Piraya Film
- 2020 : Sara Johnsen and Pål Sletaune
- 2021 : Utøya and Jørgen Watne Frydnes
- 2022 : Lise Klaveness
- 2023 : Ella Marie Hætta Isaksen, Bjørn Olav Jahr.
- 2024 : Teachers at the Oslo Cathedral School.
- 2025 : Sarah Gaulin.
