= Anders Sømme Hammer =

Norwegian journalist (born 1977)

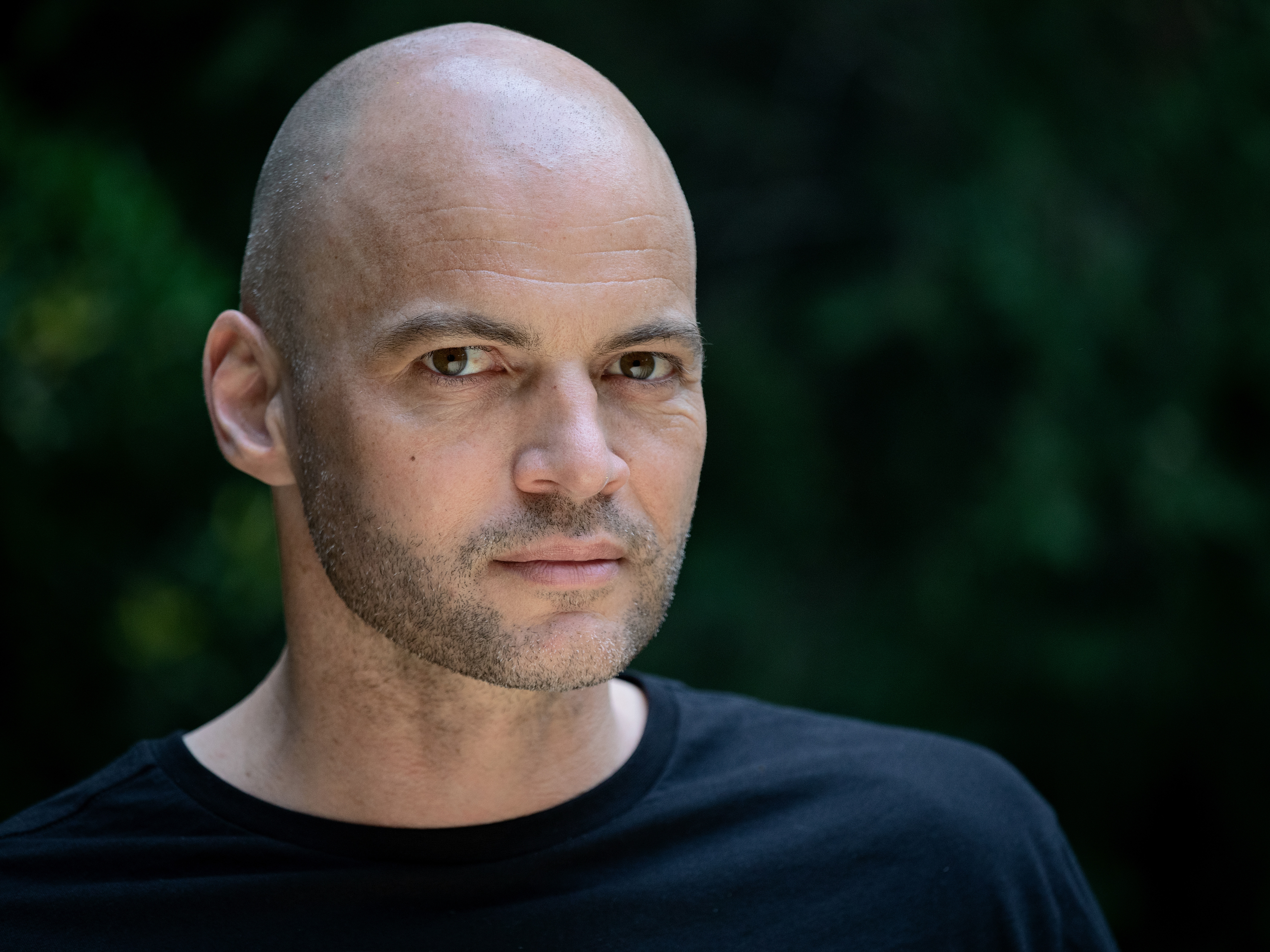
Anders Sømme Hammer, 2022

Anders Sømme Hammer (born 20 August 1977) is a Norwegian documentarian and journalist.

== Career ==
He moved to Kabul, Afghanistan in June 2007 to cover the ongoing war. He was a freelancer, but produced for several media outlets. He delivered news and radio and television documentaries for NRK and TV 2, and wrote for national outlets such as Dagbladet, Dagsavisen, Dagens Næringsliv, Morgenbladet, the Norwegian News Agency and Samtiden. In 2010, he released the book Drømmekrigen ("The Dream War") on Aschehoug.

He was named Freelancer of the Year by the Norwegian Union of Journalists in 2010 and received the Fritt Ord Award in 2011.

His 2019 documentary Do Not Split was awarded the Short Film Special Jury Prize at the AFI Docs 2020 festival. It later got nominated for the Academy Award for Best Documentary Short Subject at the 93rd Academy Awards. In 2022 he released a book on the 2019 Baerum mosque shooting, focusing on its perpetrator, Philip Manshaus. The book, Terroristen fra Bærum: Radikaliseringen av Philip Manshaus (transl. Terrorist from Bærum: The Radicalization of Philip Manshaus), is based on most of the same materials as the docuseries he had made on the case previously.

Awards
| Preceded by Bushra Ishaq; Abid Raja | Recipient of the Fritt Ord Award; 2011 | Succeeded by Sara Azmeh Rasmussen |
