= Per Fugelli =

Norwegian physician (1943–2017)

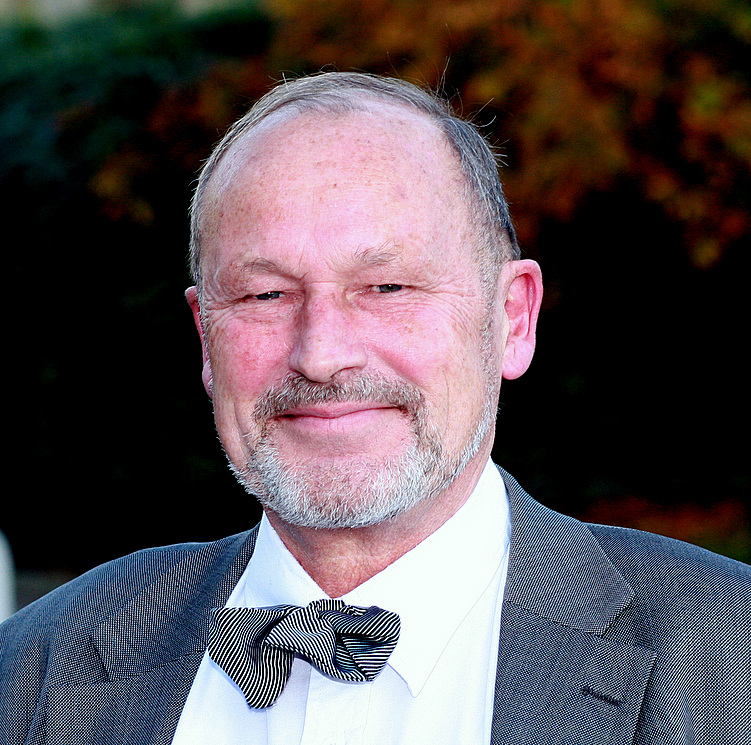
- Fugelli in 2008
- Born: 7 December 1943; Stavanger, Norway
- Died: 13 September 2017 (aged 73); Jæren, Norway
- Occupations: Physician, professor, author
- Awards: Fritt Ord Award (2013)

Per Fugelli (7 December 1943 – 13 September 2017) was a Norwegian physician and professor of General Practice at the University of Bergen from 1984 to 1992, and social medicine at the University of Oslo from 1992 until his death in 2017.

== Early life and education ==
Fugelli was born in Stavanger, Norway, on December 7, 1943. He studied medicine at University of Oslo.

== Career ==
From 1971–73 Fugelli was a general practitioner in Værøy Municipality and Røst Municipality, and from 1977 to 1980 in Porsanger Municipality. During this time he earned his PhD and graduated in 1978. In 1984, he became a Professor of General Practice at the University of Bergen, where he stayed until 1992. He became a Professor of social medicine at University of Oslo's Institute of Health and Society. In 2013, he became Emeritus.

== Legacy ==
In 1993 Fugelli wrote: "The patient Earth is sick. Global environmental disruptions can have serious consequences for human health. It's time for doctors to give a world diagnosis and advise on treatment," predating the founding of planetary health. He is the subject of the documentary I die by filmmaker Erik Poppe.

== Publications ==
He was a frequent contributor to the public debate on health and medical questions. Among his early books are Tilbake til huslegen from 1975, Doktor på Værøy og Røst from 1977, and Helsetilstand og helsetjeneste på Værøy og Røst from 1978.

He published the essay collections Med sordin og kanon and Helse og rettferdighet in 1990, 0-visjonen in 2003, and Nokpunktet in 2008. He has been editor or co-editor of several works, including Huslegen from 1985, Medisinsk leksikon from 1990, Medisin og helse from 1993, and Verdier og penger i helsetjenesten from 2009.

== Personal life ==
Fugelli was married, had two children, and three grandchildren by the time he died.

In 2009, he was diagnosed with colorectal cancer. It metastasized into his lungs and by 2012, the cancer was declared terminal. Nevertheless, Fugelli continued to write and work as long as he was able, with his final published article written six weeks before his death. He died at Jæren on 13 September 2017, aged 73.

== Awards ==
Fugelli won the 2010 Karl Evang Prize and in 2013, the Freedom of Expression Foundation Prize.

Awards
Preceded by Sara Azmeh Rasmussen	Recipient of the Fritt Ord Award; 2013	Succeeded by Anne Sender
