= Astrid Nøklebye Heiberg =

Norwegian politician (1936–2020)

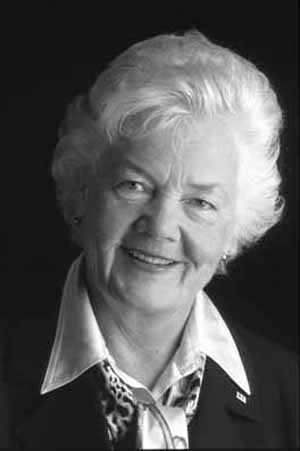
Astrid Nøklebye Heiberg

Astrid Nøklebye Heiberg (14 April 1936 – 2 April 2020) was a Norwegian politician for the Conservative Party, and a professor of medicine. She was the state secretary to the minister of social affairs 1981–1985, and minister of administration and consumer affairs in 1986.

Heiberg was vice-chairwoman of the Conservative Party from 1990 to 1991 and member of the Norwegian Parliament from 1985 to 1989. She was President of the Norwegian Red Cross from 1993 to 1999 and President of the International Federation of Red Cross and Red Crescent Societies from 1997 to 2001.

Heiberg restarted her national political career in 2013. She was elected as deputy representative to the Parliament of Norway for the terms 2013–2017 and 2017–2021. She was also appointed as State Secretary in the Ministry of Health and Care Services, resigning in 2016.

Heiberg died on 2 April 2020 at the age of 83.

Non-profit organization positions
Preceded by Bjørn Bruland	President of the Norwegian Red Cross; 1993–1999	Succeeded by Thorvald Stoltenberg
Preceded by Mario Enrique; Villarroel Lander	President of the International Federation of Red Cross and Red Crescent Societies; 1997–2000	Succeeded by Don Juan Manuel; Suárez Del Toro Rivero
