= Egil Hovland =

Norwegian composer (1924–2013)

Egil Hovland (October 18, 1924 – February 5, 2013) was a Norwegian composer.

Hovland was born in Råde. He studied at the Oslo conservatory with Arild Sandvold and Bjarne Brustad, in Copenhagen with Vagn Holmboe, at Tanglewood with Aaron Copland, and in Florence with Luigi Dallapiccola. He was the organist and choir leader in Fredrikstad from 1949 until his death. His many works include two symphonies, a concerto for trumpet and strings, Music for Ten Instruments, a set of variations for two pianos, and a lament for orchestra. His sacred works include a Norwegian Te Deum, a Gloria, a Magnificat, and numerous works for organ, and he was one of Norway's most noted church composers.

He wrote in diverse styles, including Norwegian-Romantic, Gregorian, neo-classical, twelve-tone, aleatoric, and serial. In honor of his work as a composer and organist, 1983 he was knighted into the Royal Norwegian Order of St. Olav. In 1992, he received the Fritt Ord Honorary Award. He was one of the most productive contemporary Norwegian composers.

== Compositions ==
=== Works for orchestra ===
- 1951 Festival Ouverture opus 18
- 1952–1953 Symphony No. 1—Symphonia Veris opus 20
- 1954–1955 Symphony No. 2, opus 24
- 1955 Concertino for 3 Trumpets and Strings, opus 23
- 1962 Concert Ouverture for orchestra, opus 39b
- 1963 Lamenti per orchestra opus 43
- 1967 Fanfare and Choral for orchestra, opus 54b
- 1968 Lilja—(Salomos høysang) opus 61, for speaker and orchestra
- 1969 Rhapsody for symphony orchestra opus 65
- 1970 Symphony No. 3, for reciter, mixed choir, and orchestra, opus 30—Text: from the Bible and O. Medbøe
- 1970 The Most Beautiful Rose for speaker, 4 sopranos, orchestra, organ, and piano—Text: Hans Christian Andersen
- 1972 Concerto for Trombone and Orchestra, opus 76
- 1974 Concerto for Violin and Orchestra, opus 81
- 1975 Noël-variations for orchestra, opus 84
- 1976–1977 Concerto No.1 for Piano and Orchestra, opus 91
- 1978 Tombeau de Bach suite, opus 95
- 1980 Intrada opus 105, for mixed choir (SATB), congregation, 2 brass ensembles (3 horns, 3 trumpets, 6 trombones, 2 tubas), orchestra, tympani, percussion, and organ—Text: D. Welander
- 1983 Danses de la mort opus 127 for orchestra
- 1986 Concerto for Piccolo Flute and Strings, opus 117
- 1996 Concerto for Oboe and Orchestra, opus 150
- 1996-1997 Concerto for viola and orchestra, opus 153
- 2000 De Profundis for baritone und orchestra
- 1962/1974 August opus 34 no. 4, for singer and orchestra—Text: J. Handagard

=== Works for wind ensemble ===
- 1962 Festival ouverture opus 39a
- 1966 Fanfare and Choral for Band opus 54a

=== Masses, cantatas, and sacred music ===
- 1962/1979 Gloria opus 40, for mixed choir (SATB), 2 trumpets, 2 horns, 3 trombones and tuba
- 1965 Litany for the Feast of the Birth of Christ opus 49, for speaker, soprano, mixed choir (SATB), orchestra and organ - text: S. Ellingsen
- 1966-1967 Rorate for 5 sopranos, organ, tape, chamber orchestra and percussion, opus 55
- 1967 Choral Cantata on a Norwegian Hymn choral cantata, opus 57, for mixed choir (SATB) and string orchestra
- 1967 Missa vigilate opus 59, for solo soprano, solo baritone, mixed choir (SATB), dancers, organ and tape
- 1968 Uppståndelsemässa opus 60, for mixed choir (SATB), 2 organs, 3 trumpets, 3 trombones, celebrant, and congregation
- 1970 Vox populi IV Introitus- och ordinarie-sånger, opus 68, for children's choir, mixed choir (SATB), congregation, 2 organs, instruments ad lib.
- 1970 Allehelgensmesse opus 70, for soprano, mixed choir (SATB), organ, 3 trumpets, 3 trombones, celebrant, congregation - text: Olav Hillestad
- 1971 Missa brevis opus 73, for mixed choir (SATB), organ, celebrant, congregation - text: Olaf Hillestad
- 1972/2000 Brønnen church opera in 2 acts, op. 77
- 1973 Missa misericordiae for mixed choir, opus 80
- 1974 Kyrkans eviga lovsång opus 82, for three mixed choirs, 2 horns, 2 trombones, tuba, bells and organ
- 1980 Meditation opus 115, for speaker, mixed choir (SATB), congregation, organ, and orchestra
- 1982 Pilgrimsmesse opus 111, for mixed choir (SATB), organ, 3 flugelhorns, 2 horns, 3 trombones, tuba, celebrant, congregation - text: Britt G. Hallqvist / Eyvind Skeie
- 1984 Preludier og satser til Inngangssalmer opus 130, for mixed choir (SATB), organ, 2 trumpets, 2 trombones and flute (ad lib)
- 1990 Sammen for Guds ansikt opus 143, for mixed choir (SATB), organ, 3 trumpets, 2 horns, 2 trombones, bass trombone and tuba
- 1991 Herre, du omgir meg Music for the Opening Procession at the Blessing of King Harald V in the Nidaros Cathedral in Oslo, 23 June 1991, opus 139, for two mixed choirs (SATB), youth choir, 4 horns, 4 trombones, 3 trumpets, organ and tympani
- 1991 Dette er dagen som Herren har gjort Music for the Final Procession at the Blessing of King Harald V in the Nidaros Cathedral in Oslo, 23 June 1991, opus 139, for mixed choir (SATB), 4 horns, 4 trombones, 3 trumpets, organ and tympani
- 1994 Diakoni-messe opus 145b, for mixed choir (SATB), 2 trumpets, 2 trombones, organ, congregation and liturgical recitation
- 1995 Stå opp, Jerusalem, bli lys Bibelsk salme for mixed choir and instruments (ad. lib.), opus 107, nr 22
- 1998 Muziek voor een familie-miss opus 88
- 1999 Fred! Det er jeg cantata, opus 165
- 2001 Jeg er Herrens tjenerinne for choir, instruments, and joining singers ad lib., opus 146 nr. 6
- Du såg mig Variationer kring psaltarpsalm 139, opus 155, for soprano solo, alto solo, two mixed choirs (SATB), 2 trumpets, 2 trombones, percussion, organ and congregation ad lib
- Missa verbi opus 78, for mixed choir (SATB), 3 trumpets, 3 horns, 3 trombones, tuba, organ, celebrant, congregation - text: K.Hafstad; Olav Hillestad; J.Smemo
- Stay With Us(orig. 'Bliv hos os') -- from the oratorio or 'church opera' FANGE OG FRI, translated into English as "Captive and Free"—for mixed choir (SATB) and string orchestra

=== Works for choir ===
- 1957 The Glory of the Father for mixed choir (SATB) - text: John 1
- 1968 How long, o Lord opus 58, for mixed choir - text: Psalm 13
- 1986 Return, My Soul motet, opus 87 No 5, for choir (SATB), soprano solo - text: Psalm 116: 7, 5, 8, 3, 4
- 1989 Det finnes en dyrebar rose for mixed choir - text: Svein Ellingsen
- 1990-1991 Credo opus 137 no 1, for mixed choir
- 1993 Min sjel tørster etter Gud Biblical Psalm, for choir (SATB), congregation, ad lib: 2 trumpets, 2 trombones, violin and organ - text: Psalm 42
- Agnus Dei Concerto for bassoon and mixed choir a capella
- Dag over Norge for mixed choir - text: Andreas Hansen
- De salige motet for mixed choir - text: Matthew 5, 7–8
- De ydmyke : motet for mixed choir - tekst: Luke 1, 51-53 and 14, 11
- Den som ber, han får for choir (SATB) and organ ad lib. - text: Luke 11, 10, 13
- Herre, vår Herre motet for mixed choir - text: Psalms 8, 2; John 3, 14–15
- Hosianna i det høyeste motet for mixed choir - text: Mark 11, 10; John 12, 24; Isaiah 53, 12
- Jerusalem for mixed choir - text: Luke 19, 42-44 (English translation: Leland B. Sateren)
- Talsmannen, Den Hellige Ånd for mixed choir - text: John 14, 26, 23 and 15, 5
- The Law and the Prophets for mixed choir - text: Bible

=== Vocal music with piano or organ ===
- 1962 Gloria opus 40b
- 1962 O store Gud vi lover deg Choral cantata, opus 41b, for choir (SATB), organ, congregation - text: Landstads reviderte salmebok No 31
- 1964 Lovad vare Herren, Israels Gud - text: Luke 1, 68.
- 1971 Saul opus 74, for mixed choir (SATB), speaker and organ - text: Bible
- 1978 Be with us for mixed choir (SATB) and organ, opus 87 No 3 - text: Luke 24, 29 and Jonah 2:3-10
- Cantate Domino Introit, opus 38
- Gloria in excelsis Deo motet, opus 5 no 1
- Jubilate for mixed choir (SATB), organ, solo singer - text: Psalms 66, 1–3
- Sing the Joyful Sound for mixed choir (SATB), children's choir, congregation and organ

=== Chamber music ===
- 1950 Suite for flute and piano, opus 15
- 1959 Suite for flute and percussion, opus 31
- 1965 Trio for violin, cello and piano, opus 48

=== Works for organ ===
- 1947 Chorale Partita No. 1 opus 7
- 1948 Improvisata - Hymnus in Honorem Sancti Magni, Comitis Orcadiæ opus 9
- 1954-1956 Suite for Organ No 1 opus 21
  1. Klippe du som brast for meg
  2. O bli hos meg
- 1959 Chorale Partita No. 3 opus 32
- 1965 Elementa pro organo opus 52
  1. Introitus
  2. Improvisation
  3. Ostinato
  4. Passacaglia
  5. Completorium.
- 1967 Chorale Partita No. 5 opus 56
- 1969-1970 Four Interludes to "Missa Vigilate" opus 67
- 1973 Job suite no. 2 voor orgel, opus 79
- 1973 Nu la oss takke Gud Organ Toccata
- 1975 Chorale Partita No. 6 - "Gelobt sei Gott im höchsten Thron" opus 90, on the tune by Vulpius
- 1978/1993 Hosanna for organ, opus 135, No. 2
- 1979 Crux Ave - Variationen über "Jerusalem, du hochgebaute Stadt" Organ partita VII
- 1981 Il canto del mare per organo opus 114
- 1982 Cantus V for trombone and organ, opus 120
- 1989 Lux aeterna for Organ
- 5 Chorale Preludes
- Chorale Partita No. 2 opus 10
- Interlude from the Opera "Brunnen"
- Organ Chorales Volume 1, 2, 3, 4, 5 en 6
- Orgel-Te Deum opus 8
- 100 Psalm Preludes

=== Works for piano ===
- 1992 Dette er dagen som Herren har gjort Utgangsmusikk ved signingsgudstjenesten i Nidarosdomen 23 June 1991, opus 139
- 1995 Getsemane Parafrase for piano over en melodi av Asa Hull, opus 29, no. 5
- In memoriam Paraphrase for Piano on the Hymn "Jordens Gud, stjärnornas Herre", opus 154
- Little Babe opus 29, no. 4
- Rondino for Piano opus 29 no. 2
- Scherzo opus 29 no. 1

== Books ==
- Norsk Musikforlag: Egil Hovland: Et liv med musikk - (Het leven met muziek). Norsk Musikforlag, Oslo. 1994. 152 pages. ISBN 82-7093-265-5
- Norsk Musikforlag: Festskrift til Egil Hovland på 50-årsdagen, 18 oktober 1974 Norsk Musikforlag, Oslo. 1974. 180 pages
- Egil Hovland: Stay With Us (St. Olaf Choral Series). Augsburg Fortress Publishers. 2001. ISBN 0-8006-5882-5
- David Eugene Tryggestad: A Comprehensive Performance Project in Organ Literature with a Study of the Organ Music of Egil Hovland, The University of Iowa, Iowa City, Iowa. 1984. 77 pages.
