= Nils Christie =

Norwegian sociologist and criminologist (1928–2015)

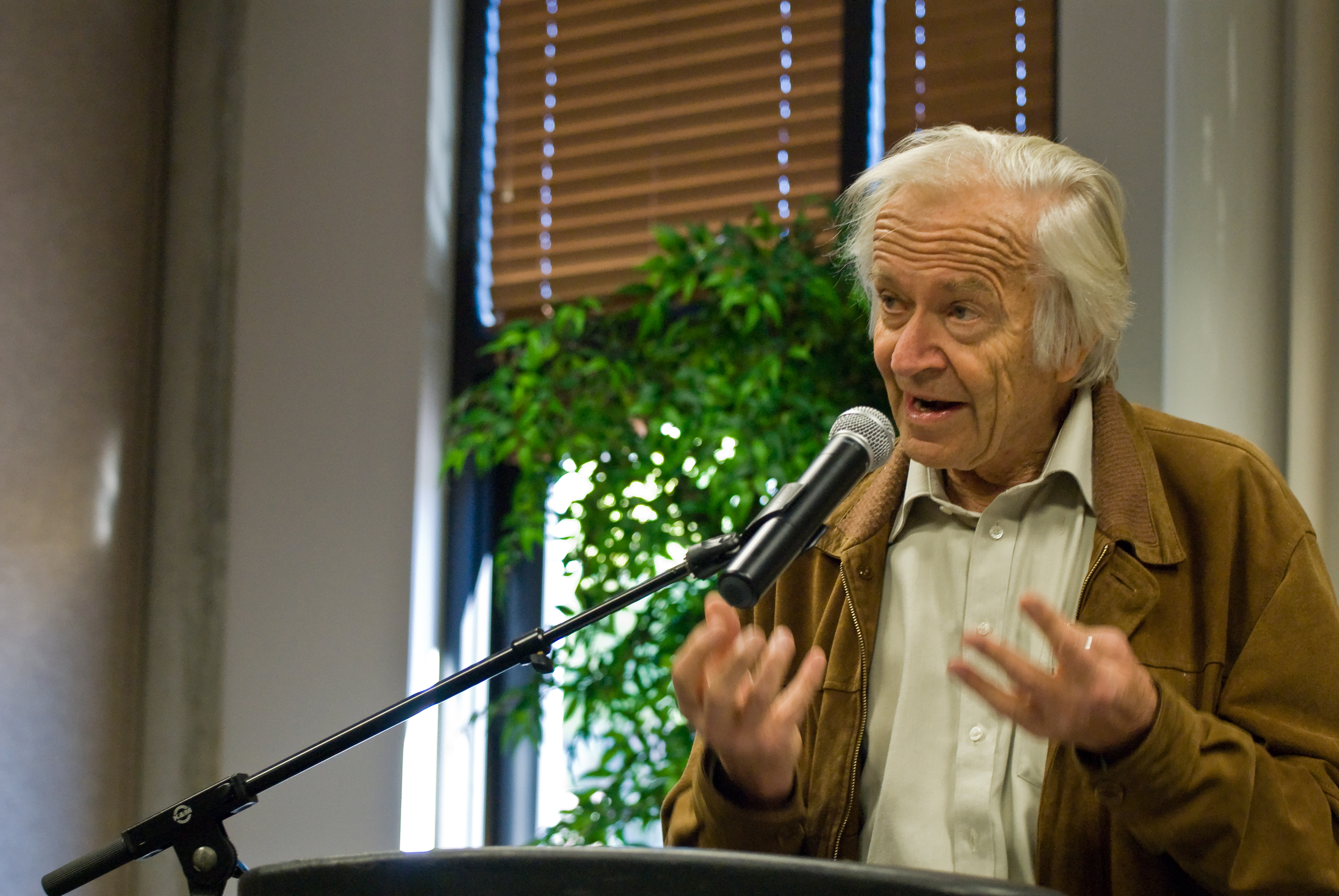
- Nils Christie speaking at Utah Valley State College in 2007
- Born: 24 February 1928; Oslo, Norway
- Died: 27 May 2015 (aged 87); Oslo, Norway
- Citizenship: Norwegian
- Awards: Fritt Ord Award (2001)
- Scientific career
- Fields: Criminology, Sociology

Nils Christie (24 February 1928 – 27 May 2015) was a Norwegian sociologist and criminologist. He was a professor of criminology at the Faculty of Law, University of Oslo. Considered a leading figure of his field, Christie is one of two Norwegian social scientists covered in the book 50 Key Thinkers in Criminology (Routledge, 2009), alongside sociologist Thomas Mathiesen.

== Early life and education ==
Christie was born in Oslo on 24 February 1928, as son of store manager Ragnvald Christie (1895-1957) and Ruth Hellum (1900-1987). He passed examen artium at Berg Upper Secondary School in 1946. He showed an early interest in societal matters and worked for a time as a journalist in the late 1940s. He graduated as M.A. in 1953 (major subject: sociology, minor subject: psychology and criminology) from the University of Oslo. His 1959 dr.philos. thesis, Unge norske lovovertredere (Young Norwegian Offenders), compared all male lawbreakers born in 1933 in Norway to others born the same year.

== Career and social theory ==
Christie was appointed docent to the Faculty of Law, University of Oslo from 1959, and reportedly became the first professor of criminology in Norway at the faculty in 1966. From the 1960s and for decades thereafter, he remained a notable participant in the public discourse, both in Norway as well as internationally, including the United States.

A prolific writer, Christie was the author of several books, including Pinens begrensning (Limits to Pain) from 1981, which has been translated into eleven languages, Crime Control as Industry (2000) and A Suitable Amount of Crime (2004). The book If Schools Didn't Exist (1971; English edition 2020) is also considered a key work of his. Christie became well known for his longstanding criticisms of drug prohibition, industrial society, and prisons. He expressed the belief that in order to understand crime, it is vital to understand the society around us, and vice versa, and he considered it the duty of a social scientist to influence society through debate and dialogue. Christie found the most vital explanations for crime in how our society is organized rather than inherent differences between people.

Despite his widely acknowledged contributions to the field of criminology, Christie was known for being critical of several aspects of criminology as a discipline, illustrated in his article 'Conflicts and Property' (1977) as well as several of his subsequent books. Christie was critical of using the term "crime" in and of itself, declaring it an "imprecise" word and arguing that what society views as criminal behavior constitutes "unwanted acts." His analysis of "the ideal victim" (1986) remains one of his most influential contributions, which analyzed the typical expectations of the victim in a criminal case.

Christie was a member of the Norwegian Academy of Science and Letters. He received an honorary degree from the University of Copenhagen in 1996. In 2001 he was awarded the Fritt Ord Freedom of Expression Prize "for his original and independent contributions to the Norwegian and international social debate." His work Fangevoktere i konsentrasjonsleire (Prison Guards in Concentration Camps, 1952) was selected for the Norwegian Sociology Canon in 2009–2011.

== Personal life ==
Christie married Vigdis Margit Moe in 1951, and was later married to sociologist Hedda Giertsen.

== Select bibliography ==
- Fangevoktere i konsentrasjonsleire (Prison Guards in Concentration Camps, 1952)
- Unge norske lovovertredere (1960)
- Hvis skolen ikke fantes (1971)
  - If Schools Didn't Exist (2020)
- Pinens begrensning (1981)
  - Limits to Pain (1981)
- Den gode fiende: Narkotikapolitikk i Norden (with Kettil Bruun, 1985)
- Kriminalitetskontrol som industri: På vej mod GULAG, vestlig stil? (1996)
  - Crime Control as Industry: Towards GULAGs, Western Style? (2000)
- En passende mengde kriminalitet (2004)
  - A Suitable Amount of Crime (2004)
- Små ord om store spørgsmål (2020)

== See also ==
- Christie's reaction to the Beisfjord Massacre

Awards
Preceded by Thomas Chr. Wyller	Recipient of the Fritt Ord Award; 2001	Succeeded by Aslam Ahsan and Shabana Rehman
