= Styren =

Styren is a Norwegian surname. Notable people with the surname include:

- Christian Styren (born 1965), Norwegian diver
- Ulf Styren (1890–1974), Norwegian businessman
