= Church of Humanity (disambiguation) =

The Church of Humanity was a positivist church founded in England in 1878 by Richard Congrve and others.

Church of Humanity may also refer to:

- Church of Humanity (comics), anti-mutant cult in the Marvel universe
- Church of Humanity Unchained, a religion in the Honorverse science fiction series

== See also ==
- Fellowship of Humanity, humanist church in Oakland, California
- Religion of Humanity, secular religion proposed c.1849 by Auguste Comte
- Humanism (disambiguation)
