= Robert Mood =

Norwegian Army officer (b.1958)

- Born: 8 December 1958 (age 67); Kragerø, Telemark, Norway
- Education: Norwegian Military Academy; NATO Defense College; United States Marine Corps University
- Military career
- Allegiance: Norway
- Branch: Norwegian Army
- Service years: 1977–2017
- Rank: Lieutenant General
- Commands: United Nations Supervision Mission in Syria; United Nations Truce Supervision Organization; Telemark Battalion
- Awards: Defence Service Medal with Laurel Branch

Lieutenant General Robert Mood (born 8 December 1958) is a former President of Norwegian Red Cross and a retired Norwegian Army officer. He is the former head of the United Nations Supervision Mission in Syria (UNSMIS), Inspector General of the Norwegian Army, and Chief of Staff of the United Nations Truce Supervision Organization (UNTSO).

== Personal life ==
Born in the small coastal town of Kragerø, Norway, Robert Mood hails from a family which immigrated from Sweden in the 19th century, adding the second "o" to the family name (mod means courage in Swedish). He grew up with two sisters, one older and one younger. His family enjoyed outdoor activities such as sailing, hunting, and mountain hiking, and he has stated a wish of being able to live on an old sailboat, immersing himself in that lifestyle, after he retires.

Mood graduated in Bergen. He has a son.

Mood is said to possess resolve as well as diplomatic skills unusual for a high-ranking military officer, and also a laconic wit. His military career has come about more by accident than by any persistent decision. In his late teens when adults were advising him to enter the non-commissioned officers' school, he did. Once inside the military, one year simply succeeded another.

Mood does not consider himself a Christian, perceiving himself more in the Humanist tradition: "I believe in something which is bigger than humans, but what that is I find difficult to define."

In an interview with Norwegian public broadcaster NRK, Mood compared his work to opera; "A good opera is all about combining very different elements into a piece that eventually becomes very impressive."

== Military career ==
=== Training ===
- Infantry non-commissioned officers school (1978)
- Norwegian Military Academy (1983)
- Army Staff School (1990)
- Army Staff School II (1993)
- NATO Defense College
- United States Marine Corps University (Masters of military studies)
- USMC School of Advanced Warfighting

=== Commands ===
Mood's military career began in 1977. In the Brigade in Northern Norway he rose from squad leader to platoon and later company commander. He was operations officer with the Norwegian Battalion in the United Nations Interim Force in Lebanon (UNIFIL) during the Lebanese Civil War, which ended in 1990. Mood was lieutenant commander at Telemark Battalion from 1993 to 1994, was promoted lieutenant colonel in 1996 and, following training with the United States Marine Corps, acted as operations officer for the 6th Division until 1998. He then became head of Telemark Battalion, which was deployed in Kosovo from 1999 to 2000. He held this position for two years, as his predecessor Jon B. Lilland had done. He was promoted to colonel in 2000 when he was appointed as Chief of Planning Branch of the Norwegian High Command. In 2002 he was promoted to brigadier and appointed chief of Hærens kampvåpen. In 2004 came his appointment to chief position in the Army Transformation and Doctrine Command (TRADOK). After the financial scandal in the army in 2005 and the departure of Lars Sølvberg, Mood became Inspector General of the Army. Robert Mood has limited conventional warfighting experience.

In January 2009 United Nations Secretary General Ban Ki-moon announced Mood's appointment as Chief of Staff of the United Nations Truce Supervision Organization (UNTSO). Serving as Head of Mission and Force Commander at Assistant Secretary General level in the UN, he was UNTSO chief until February 2011, holding offices in Beirut, Damascus, Cairo and Jerusalem (also covering Amman).

On 1 August 2011 he became the first director and veteran inspector of Defence Veteran Services (FVT), a temporary project, under the academic supervision of Head of Defence Staff/P. FVT has been commissioned to implement improvements and fill the role as advisor and spokesperson for veteran affairs to the Chief of Defence of Norway.

Mood was promoted lieutenant general and made chief of the Military Mission in Brussels in January 2014.

==== UN commission in the Syria conflict ====
In April 2012 Mood was commissioned to assist Kofi Annan in Annan's work as Special Envoy of the Secretary-General and the Arab League in Syria in connection with the conflict there. The Kofi Annan peace plan for Syria was worked out from 5 to 8 April with the negotiations being carried around the clock under Mood's leadership. The greatest challenge was that Syria insisted on maintaining its sovereignty. According to Mood, "Syria insists on the right to use military means also against its own population when they find that necessary." Mood's good relations with the Syrian military has been seen as a threat by the Syrian government, according to the state-owned Norwegian Broadcasting Corporation. The ceasefire went into effect on 12 April.

Following 21 April decision by the UN Security Council to dispatch 300 military ceasefire observers to Syria under UN auspices—the United Nations Supervision Mission in Syria (UNSMIS)—Mood was tipped as a possible, even likely, candidate for the Force Commander position (Special Representative of the Secretary-General – SRSG). On 25 April news emerged that he would get the appointment, and the selection was announced on 27 April. In the weeks before the appointment questions had arisen about the process that led to Mood's selection. Mood was present at a meeting in the Security Council on 23 April, but neither the UN Secretary General's deputy spokesman nor the US ambassador would give details on his status vis-à-vis the UN. Mood himself also refused to answer media questions about his presence at the Security Council meeting wearing military uniform. Information about who was paying for his travel activities also remained unanswered. Earlier in the process Mood's candidacy had been opposed by Russia. On 10 April Mood left Damascus for Geneva, and Russia's UN ambassador strongly criticized his leaving Syria at a critical juncture, insinuating this was unprofessional conduct. Russia in the end did approve his appointment.

UNSMIS established itself in three weeks as a full mission with presence from Deraa in the south to Aleppo in the north and later Deir E Zoor in the east and opened dialogue with rebels and officials at local level as well as in Damascus with government officials. In mid-June the violence had increased again to a level that, according to Mood, made it impossible for UNSMIS to carry out its mandated tasks and operations were frozen. The UN Security Council decided in July not to extend the mandate of UNSMIS beyond a final 30 days and Mood left Syria.

Mood has expressed a personal infatuation with both Damascus and Syria, where he has spent much time during his 2009–2011 leadership of UNTSO, accompanied by his family.

=== Decorations ===
Mood has been awarded the following decorations: Defense Service Medal with Laurel Branch, Armed Forces Medal for International Operations with three stars, Army National Service Medal with three stars, the United Nations Medal for UNTSO, the United Nations Medal for UNIFIL, NATO Medal for Kosovo and the Norwegian Veteran Association of International Operations badge of honor.

Awards
Preceded by Robin Schaefer and Jan Erik Skog	Recipient of the Fritt Ord Award; 2016	Succeeded by Dag og tid
