= Do Not Split =

2020 documentary short film by Anders Hammer

- Film poster
- Directed by: Anders Hammer
- Produced by: Anders Hammer; Charlotte Cook
- Distributed by: Field of Vision
- Release date: 24 January 2020 (Sundance)
- Running time: 35 minutes
- Countries: Norway; United States
- Languages: Cantonese; English; Mandarin

Do Not Split (Chinese: 不割席; pinyin: Bù gē xí) is a 2020 documentary short film directed by Anders Hammer about the 2019–2020 Hong Kong protests. The film was nominated for the Academy Award for Best Documentary Short Subject at the 93rd Academy Awards. The film was funded and produced by Field of Vision and supported by Fritt Ord and Viken Filmsenter.

== Synopsis ==
The film is about 35 minutes long and records many landmark events of the anti-Extradition Law Amendment Bill (anti-ELAB) movement in Hong Kong, including the siege of the Chinese University of Hong Kong, the siege of the Hong Kong Polytechnic University, and protests at the City University of Hong Kong. It also includes interviews with demonstrators and scholars at the scene, and the film also records the suppression of the protests and movement in 2020 and the passage of the Hong Kong national security law. The director Anders Hammer believed that the anti-ELAB movement was one of the most important political events in the world in 2019, and that Hong Kong is facing challenges to democratic values. By presenting the events from a street-level perspective, Hammer hopes that the film will be as close to the events as possible.

== Release ==
A 20-minute preliminary version was shown at the 2020 Sundance Film Festival in January 2020. Then, a 35-minute cut was premiered at DOC NYC in the fall of 2020.

The film was screened at a number of film festivals internationally, including the New Orleans Film Festival in the US and the Copenhagen International Documentary Film Festival in Denmark. It was released by Field of Vision on 25 January 2021.

Do Not Split was uploaded on YouTube and Vimeo on 25 January 2021, and is available to watch for free.

== Awards and nominations ==
Do Not Split was nominated for the Academy Award for Best Documentary Short Subject at the 93rd Academy Awards. The film is the third Field of Vision short film to receive an Oscar nomination in three years. Following the nomination, the Chinese government told local media not to live transmit the Oscars and to downplay the significance of the awards ceremony, according to reports. TVB, the largest free-to-air broadcaster in Hong Kong, announced that it would not broadcast the Oscars for the first time in 50 years.

Anders Hammer won the Video Journalist of the Year and the long documentary award for the film at the 2020 Photo of the Year Awards in Norway. The film won the Special Jury Prize at the AFI Docs 2020.

== See also ==
- List of TV and films with critiques of Chinese Communist Party
