= Hans Høegh =

- Born: September 1, 1926
- Died: October 31, 2010 (aged 84); Oslo
- Occupations: Businessperson, organizational leader
- Awards: Commander of the Order of St. Olav

Hans Høegh (1 September 1926 – 31 October 2010) was a Norwegian businessman and organizational leader.

Høegh was President of the Norwegian Red Cross from 1975 to 1981. Thereafter he was General Secretary of the League of Red Cross Societies in Geneve. From 1988 to 1993 was Høegh Assistant Secretary General in the United Nations. He served as Special Representative of the UN Secretary General for the Promotion of the United Nations Decade of Disabled Persons between 1988 and 1993.

He was the brother of WW II fighter pilot Anders Høegh.
