= Berge Furre =

Norwegian politician

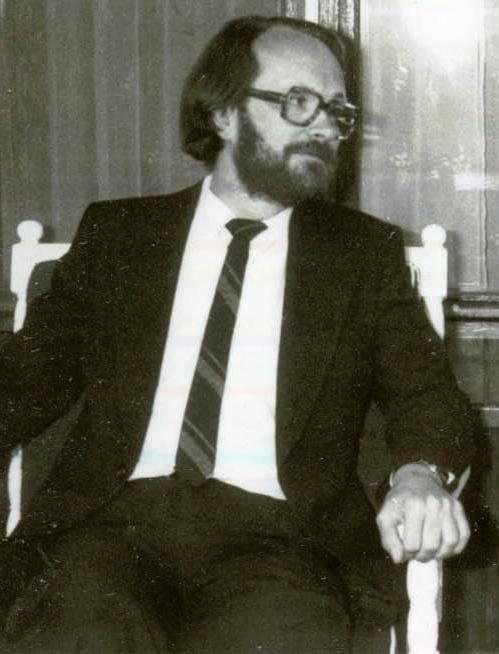
Berge Furre, 1978

Berge Ragnar Furre (13 April 1937 – 11 January 2016) was a Norwegian historian, theologian and politician for the Socialist Left Party.

== Early life and career ==
Furre was born in Sjernarøy Municipality in 1937, the son of engineer Berge Bergesen Furre (1887–1952) and secretary Else Otilie Tjomsaas (1906–1993). He took primary education in Sjernarøy, Stavanger, and Oslo, and finished his secondary education in Oslo in 1955. Later that year he enrolled at the University of Oslo. In 1959 he became the leader of the Norwegian Students' Society. He was a member of the Labour Party, but as the chairman of Sosialistisk Studentlag (1956–1957) he was central to the so-called "Easter Uprising" in 1958. He later left the Labour Party to found the Socialist People Party together with other prominent persons in the Easter Uprising, such as Finn Gustavsen. He was the party secretary from 1961 to 1964.

Furre finally graduated with a cand.philol. degree in 1968. Already in 1967 he had been appointed as an editor of the Nynorsk periodical Syn og Segn; he was also a board member of the Nynorsk newspaper Dag og Tid. In 1969 he became a research fellow at NAVF. He left both the editor and research fellow position in 1971 to become an associate professor of history at the University of Tromsø. He was also a member of the board of Noregs Mållag from 1968 to 1969, and vice chairman from 1969 to 1970. From 1971 to 1972 he was a board member of Folkebevegelsen mot EF.

== Political career ==
=== National politics ===
Furre was a member of the Norwegian Parliament for the Socialist Left Party from 1973 to 1977, representing the county Rogaland. During this term he chaired the Standing Committee on Agriculture, and was a member of the Election Committee and the Enlarged Committee on Foreign Affairs. He was the party leader from 1976 to 1983, having formerly been a central committee member in 1961–1964 and 1969–1971 and then deputy leader from 1971 to 1976.

=== Academic career ===
Having left the University of Tromsø when elected to Parliament in 1973, he returned in 1975 as a lecturer. He held this position until 1985, when he was promoted to professor. However, he held this position for only one year. In 1986 he instead involved himself in Christian work. He held a number of positions: he was a member of the Church of Norway General Synod, the Diocese Council of Oslo and the Church of Norway Council on Ecumenical and International Relations. Furre became a professor of church history at the University of Oslo in 1991. He was also a board member of Church City Mission from 1992 to 2000. He was ordained a priest in 1998 and retired in 2007.

He was also a member of the Lund commission from 1994 to 1996, which looked into the police intelligence services. During this period, Furre himself was secretly investigated by the same services. When this came to light, it prompted the previous Minister of Justice and the Police Grete Faremo to resign from her then post of Minister of Energy.

Furre became a member of the Norwegian Academy of Science and Letters in 1998, and was a member of the international committee of the Norwegian Agrarian Association from 2000. From 2003 to 2009 he was a member of the Norwegian Nobel Committee. He was also the deputy chair of Det Norske Teatret from 1986 to 1997 and chair from 1997 to 2004.

== Publications ==
Furre wrote a number of books, particularly on historical and political topics. Furre's book: Norsk historie 1905-1990: vårt hundreår, is used as a general introduction to Norwegian history at several universities and university colleges.

- 1990 Soga om Lars Oftedal ISBN 82-521-3468-8 - about the clergyman Lars Oftedal
- 1992 Norsk historie 1905-1990 : vårt hundreår (History of Norway 1905-1990 : our century) ISBN 82-521-3487-4
- 2000 Norsk historie 1914-2000 Industrisamfunnet - frå vokstervisse til framtidstvil (History of Norway 1914-2000) ISBN 978-82-521-5187-9

Party political offices
Preceded by Berit Ås	Leader of the Socialist Left Party; 1977–1983	Succeeded by Theo Koritzinsky
Awards
Preceded by Aslam Ahsan and Shabana Rehman	Recipient of the Fritt Ord Award; 2003	Succeeded by Unni Wikan
