= Robin Schaefer =

Robin Schaefer (born 1969) is a Norwegian police officer, crime investigator and whistleblower. He published the book Monika-saken. Min historie - fra drapsetterforsker til varsler in 2015. He received the Fritt Ord Award in 2015, shared with Jan Erik Skog.

Awards
Preceded by Anne Sender	Recipient of the Fritt Ord Award shared with Jan Erik Skog; 2015	Succeeded by Robert Mood
