= Arnhild Lauveng =

Norwegian psychologist

Arnhild Lauveng (born 13 January 1972) is a Norwegian psychologist.

== Personal life ==
Lauveng had schizophrenia from the age of 17. She spent 10 years in various institutions. When she recovered she studied psychology at the University of Oslo, and now works as a clinical psychologist. In her autobiographical memoir A Road Back from Schizophrenia she describes her life at the hospital ward.

== Awards ==
- Fritt Ord Honorary Award (2008)

== Selected publications ==
- I morgen var jeg alltid en løve, Cappelen Damm (2005)
- A Road Back from Schizophrenia: A Memoir, Skyhorse Publishing (2012)
