= Ellen Gulbranson =

Swedish operatic soprano (1863–1947)

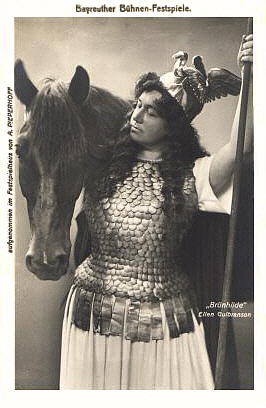
- Ellen Gulbranson as Wagner's Brünnhilde.
- Born: Ellen Nordgren; 4 March 1863; Stockholm, Sweden
- Died: 2 January 1947 (aged 83); Oslo, Norway
- Occupation: Operatic soprano
- Spouse: Hans Peter Francis Gulbranson

Ellen Gulbranson (née Nordgren; 4 March 1863 – 2 January 1947) was a Swedish operatic soprano with a strong, dramatic voice best suited to the works of Richard Wagner. She was a leading figure among the second generation of Bayreuth singers and her voice is preserved on a few acoustic recordings that she made for Edison Records and Pathé Records during the early part of the 20th century. In 1911, she was awarded The King's Medal of Merit by Sweden's monarch.

== Biography ==
Born Ellen Nordgren in Stockholm, Gulbranson studied initially at the Stockholm Conservatory under Julius Gunther and then in Paris with Ellen Kenneth and the great pedagogue Mathilde Marchesi. Subsequently, she also studied with Marchesi's daughter Blanche, who strengthened Gulbranson's top notes and transformed her voice from that of a mezzo-soprano into that of a dramatic soprano.

Gulbranson made her operatic debut in 1889 as Amneris in Giuseppe Verdi's Aida in Stockholm, and sang the Wagnerian roles of Brünnhilde and Ortrud there in 1898. She went on to excel in portraying these heroines—as well as succeeding in the parts of Kundry in Parsifal and Isolde in Tristan und Isolde.

In 1896, she made her first appearance at the Bayreuth Festival, then in its 20th year, alternating in the role of Brünnhilde with the veteran diva Lilli Lehmann. Her portrayal was so well received that Lehmann dropped out of the festival. Gulbranson went on to sing annually at Bayreuth until 1914. She also appeared in London at the Royal Opera, Covent Garden, in 1900 and 1907.

After retiring from the stage in 1915 she worked as a singing teacher. Her most notable pupil was Eidé Norena. She later became a Norwegian citizen. Gulbranson died in Oslo at the age of 83.

She was married to lieutenant colonel Hans Peter Francis Gulbranson and sister in law to Arne Eggen. Their daughter married business executive Ulf Styren.
