= Egil A. Wyller =

Norwegian philosopher (1925–2021)

Egil Anders Wyller
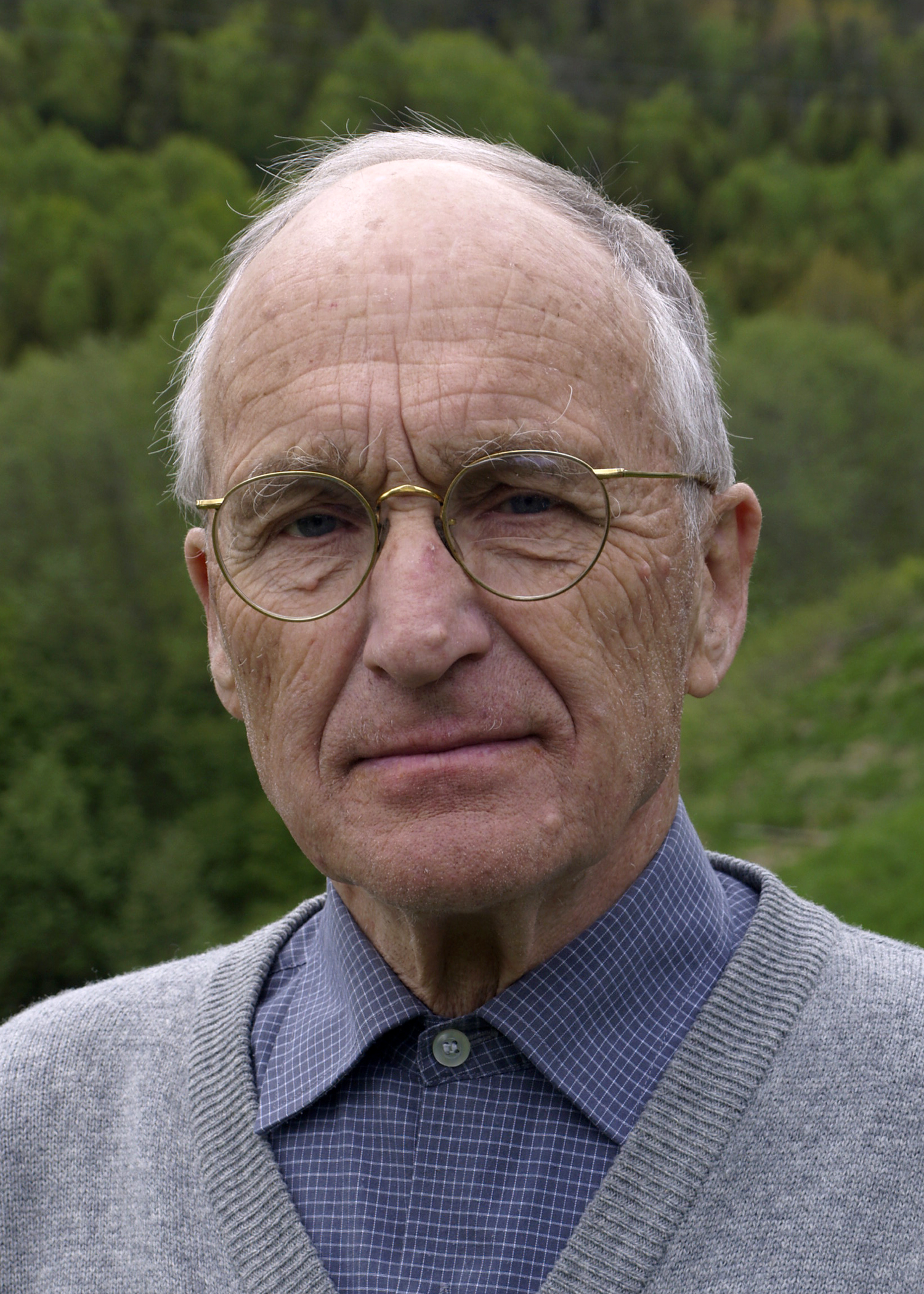
- Born: 24 April 1925; Stavanger, Norway
- Died: 6 March 2021 (aged 95)
- Occupations: Philosopher, historian, writer
- Employer: University of Oslo
- Relatives: Thomas Christian Wyller (brother)
- Awards: Order of St. Olav

Egil Anders Wyller (24 April 1925 – 6 March 2021) was a Norwegian philosopher, historian, non-fiction writer and translator. He was born in Stavanger, the son of Trygve Christian Wyller and Anne Kathrine Dons, and brother of Thomas Christian Wyller.

In the post-war years he studied intellectual history at the University of Oslo and he finished his Master of Arts (Mag.art) in 1954. He then continued his studies at Tübingen and Freiburg before returning to Oslo where he became Dr. Philos (PhD) in 1961, with a dissertation on the philosophy of Plato. He was assigned professor at the University of Oslo from 1969. In 1971 he was one of the founders of the Nordic Plato-Society (Nordisk selskab for antikkens idétradition).

Among his books are Tidsproblemet hos Olaf Bull from 1958 and Enhet og annethet from 1981. He has translated dialogues of Plato into Norwegian language, and been a co-editor of the book series Idé og tanke. He was decorated Knight, First Class of the Order of St. Olav in 2000. He was inducted into the Norwegian Academy of Science and Letters in 1988.

== Books ==
- Tidsproblemet hos Olaf Bull. Et eksistensfilosofisk bidrag (1959)
- Fra Homer til Heidegger (1959)
- Fra tankens og troens møtested (1968)
- Der späte Platon (Hamburg, 1970)
- Gjerningsord (1974)
- Enhet og annethet (1981)
- Den sene Platon (1984)
- Henologische Perspektiven I/II (Amsterdam 1995)
- Henologisk skriftserie (20 volumes, 1994–2002)
