= Morten Morland =

Norwegian cartoonist

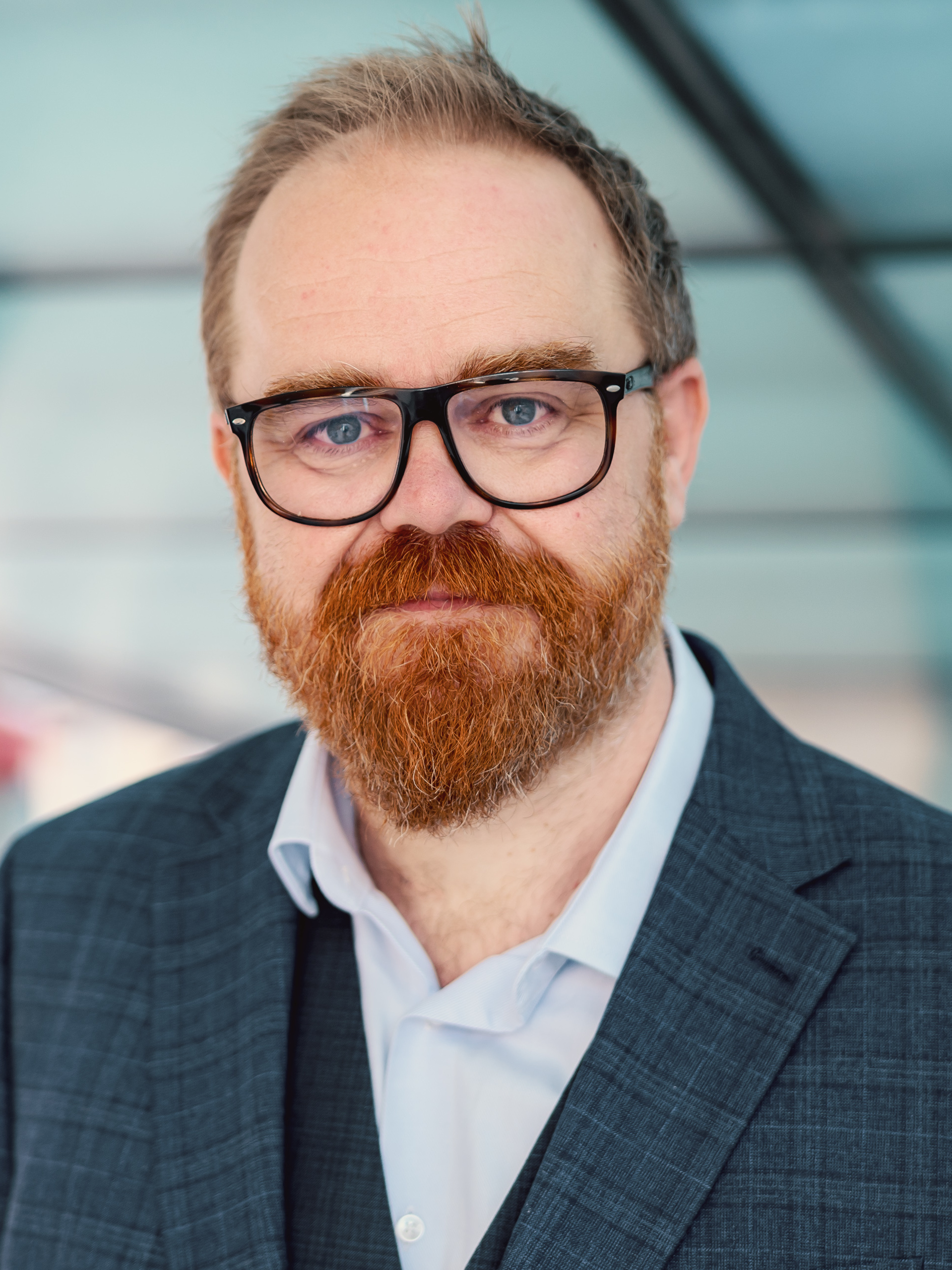
- Morland in 2025
- Born: Morten Mørland; 1979 (age 46–47) Tromøya, Norway
- Areas: Political cartoonist, artist
- Pseudonym: Poldraw
- Awards: Political Cartoon Society Cartoon of the Year (2005; 2008; 2013; 2017); Cartoon Art Trust Political Cartoonist of the Year (2009); Cartoonist of the Year, The Press Awards (2015, 2020, 2023); Norsk Journalistlag Newspaper Cartoonist of the Year (2023); Fritt Ord Award (2025)

Morten Mørland (born 1979) is a Norwegian political cartoonist working in the United Kingdom. His work regularly appears in The Times, and previously The Spectator. He has won several British and Norwegian cartoon awards.

== Career ==
Since 2002, his work is regularly featured in The Times newspaper, as well as other newspapers, magazines, and television, including The Spectator cover for 15 years until 2024, GQ, and The Economist in the UK, and VG and Agderposten (where he began his career in 2000) in Norway. He works in pen and ink and is influenced by Kevin Kallaugher.

Morland's 2004 cartoon satirising the Israeli–Palestinian peace process adapted James Gillray's 18th-century cartoon "Sin, Death, and the Devil", presenting the viewer with "a parody of an eighteenth-century parody of Milton’s seventeenth-century poem". One of his favourite subjects was Prime Minister Gordon Brown. A 2022 The Times cartoon showed Russians invading Ukraine bouncing off President Zelenskyy.

== Recognition ==
His work has won several awards: Political Cartoon Society Cartoon of the Year (2005; 2008; 2013; 2017), Cartoon Art Trust Political Cartoonist of the Year (2009), and Cartoonist of the Year at The Press Awards three times (2015, 2020, and 2023); he was shortlisted in 2026. He won the Norwegian Norsk Journalistlag Newspaper Cartoonist of the Year in 2023 for "Rødt" in VG, showing Bjørnar Moxnes as the Pied Piper, for its caricature and political sting. He jointly won the 2025 Fritt Ord Foundation Prize with May Linn Clement and Marvin Halleraker.

Norwegian museum Avistegnernes Hus held an exhibition of his work in 2023 to mark twenty years of him working for The Times. "Licence to Offend", an exhibition of political cartoons included Morland's work at the Colony Room Green drinking club in London from September to October 2025, following its cancellation earlier that year at a venue in Kingston upon Thames due to concerns about safety.

== Early life and education ==
Morland grew up in Tromøya in Norway. He studied journalism at Mediehøgskolen Gimlekollen. He moved to London in 2000 to study. He has a degree in graphic design from Surrey Institute of Art and Design (2003). He got a job at The Times after he interviewed Peter Brookes for his thesis on the history of British newspaper cartoons.
