= Torstein Dale =

Norwegian physician and military officer

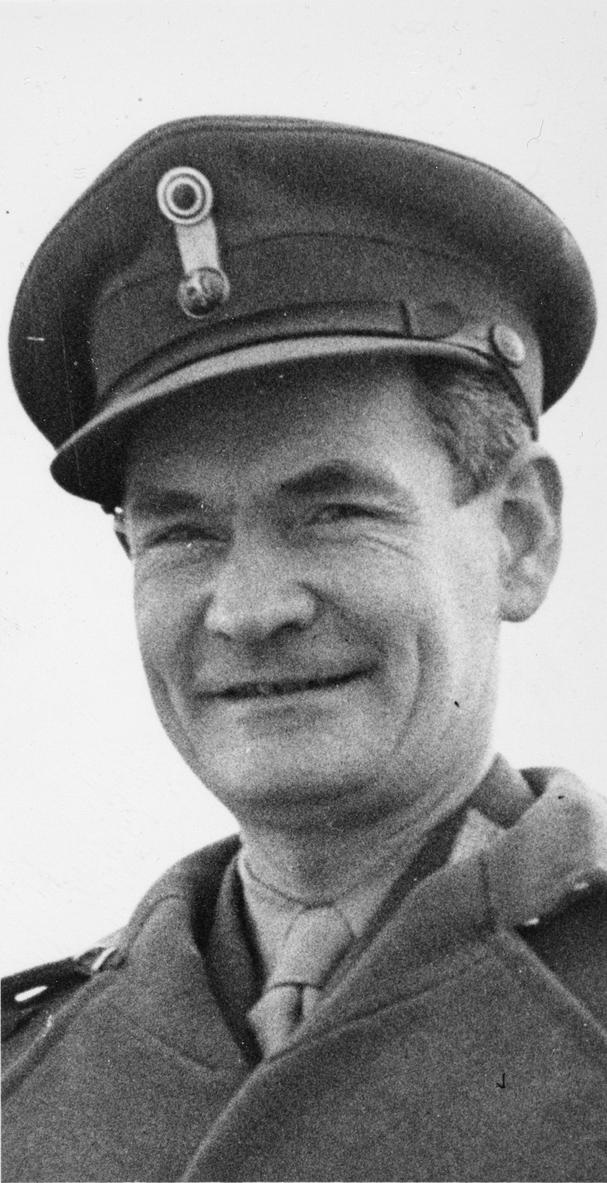
- Major general Torstein Dale, 1966
- Born: 8 May 1907; Bruvik Municipality, Norway
- Died: 18 March 1975 (aged 67)
- Occupation: Physician
- Awards: Defence Medal 1940–1945; Haakon VII 70th Anniversary Medal; Order of St. Olav

Torstein Dale (8 May 1907 – 18 March 1977) was a Norwegian physician and military officer. He served as president of the Norwegian Red Cross.

== Personal life ==
Dale was born in Bruvik Municipality in Søndre Bergenhus county, Norway. He was the son of Albert Martin Dale (1880–1959) and Oline Neset (1878–1954). He graduated as cand.med. from the University of Oslo in 1934. In 1962 he married Unn Motzfeldt Søiland.

== Career ==
Dale participated as a volunteer in the Norwegian People's Aid during the Finnish Winter War (1939-1940) in the aftermath of the invasion by the Soviet Union. Following the Occupation of Norway by Nazi Germany, Dale was head of the hospital at the Norwegian Armed Forces in exile in Scotland, and he chaired the medical service during the Liberation of Finnmark in 1944.

Dale was promoted Major General and head of the Norwegian Army Medical Service (Forsvarets sanitet) from 1951 to 1972. He served as president of the Norwegian Red Cross from 1966 to 1975. He was decorated as Commander of the Order of St. Olav in 1968. Torstein Dale died during 1977 and was buried in the cemetery of Vestre Aker Church in Oslo. Since his death, the Norwegian Red Cross has awarded the Torstein Dale Memorial Prize (Torstein Dales minnepris) in the memory of Dale.

== See also ==
- Foreign support of Finland in the Winter War
