= Aslam Ahsan =

Norwegian politician

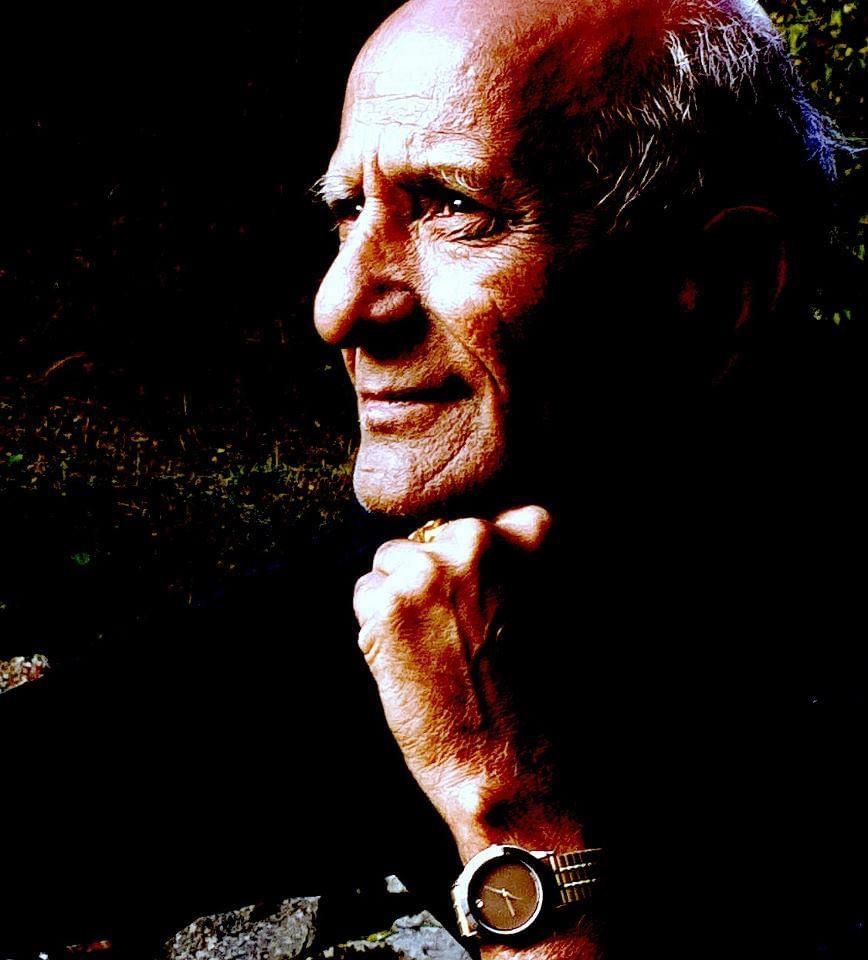
Aslam Ahsan's Portrait

Mohammed Aslam Ahsan Chaudhary (Urdu: محمد اسلم احسن چوہدری; born March 15, 1942) is a Pakistani Norwegian politician for the Labour Party.

Born in Punjab, British India, he migrated to Sweden in May 1971 and to Oslo, Norway in August the same year. He took a job in the industry, and became active in his trade union. He eventually became involved in local politics, and was elected to serve in Lørenskog municipal council in 1983 to 2019, 36 years as one of the first Asian immigrants to Norway.

He has also been a member of Norway's Contact Committee for Immigrants and the Authorities. He has become known nationwide as a debater in the public sphere, and won the Fritt Ord Award for freedom of expression in 2002. In 2009 he was awarded the HM The King's Medal of Merit in Gold. He wrote a book with title "regnbønnen" in 2007. This bok was honored as one of the ten popular books of the year.

Awards
Preceded by Nils Christie	Recipient of the Fritt Ord Award; 2002 (shared with Shabana Rehman)	Succeeded by Berge Furre
