= Ørnulf Ranheimsæter =

Norwegian writer and illustrator

- Born: 6 June 1919; Skien, Norway
- Died: 31 October 2007 (aged 88)
- Occupations: Illustrator, graphic artist and essayist
- Awards: Fritt Ord Honorary Award

Ørnulf Ranheimsæter (6 June 1919 – 31 October 2007) was a Norwegian illustrator, graphical artist and essayist.

He was born in Skien, and educated at the Norwegian National Academy of Craft and Art Industry, where he also later worked as instructor and eventually professor. He is known for his many book designs, and received the Bokkunstprisen award in 1967 and 1987. He was awarded the Fritt Ord Honorary Award in 1998.
