= Nils E. Øy =

Norwegian newspaper editor (born 1946)

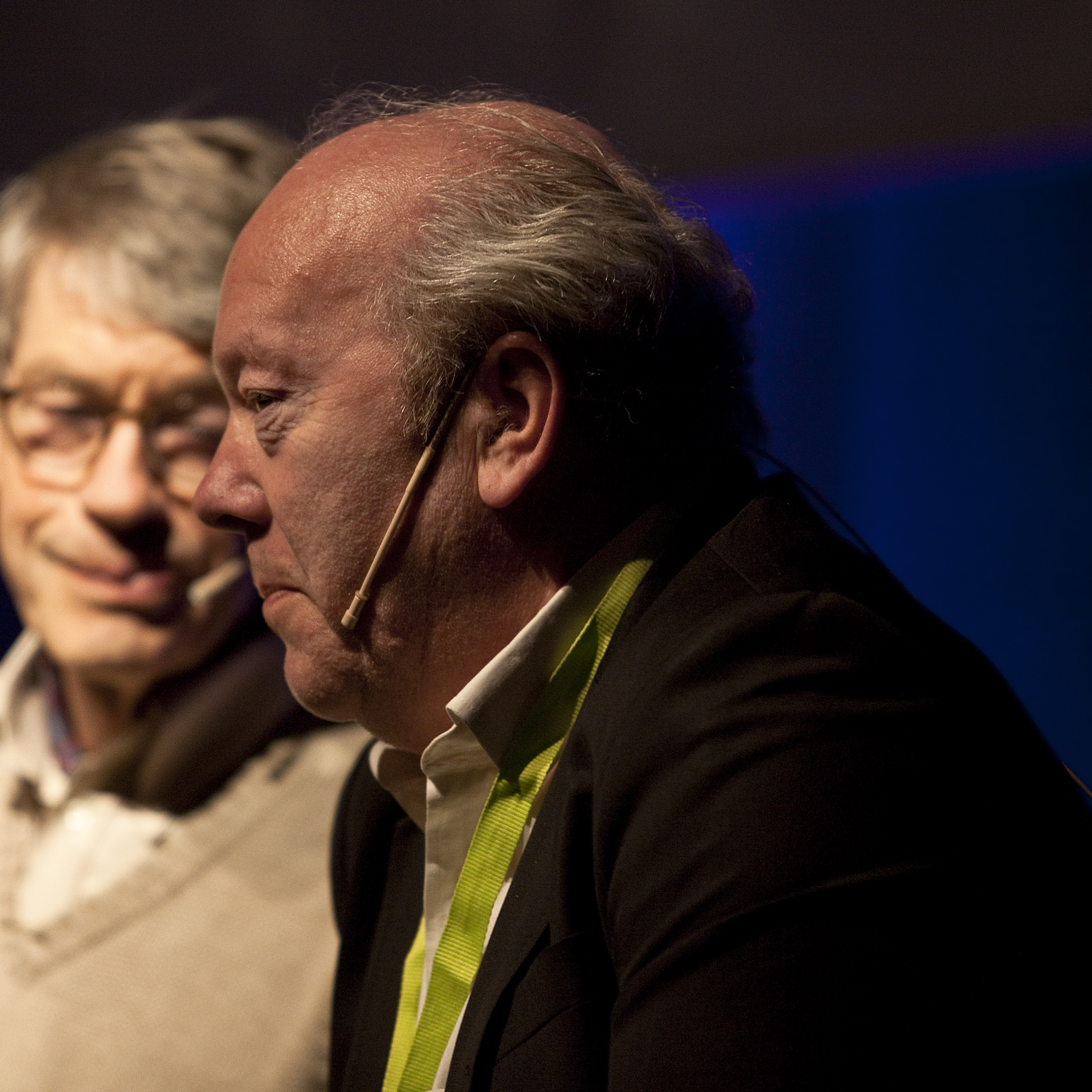
Nils E. Øy, 2010

Nils E. Øy (born 11 January 1946) is a Norwegian newspaper editor.

He was born in Ørsta Municipality. He started his journalistic career in Fredriksstad Blad in 1964, and was promoted to feature editor in 1971. From 1977 to 1983 he was the assisting director of the Institute for Journalism in Fredrikstad, and from 1979 to 1981 he edited the union magazine Journalisten.

He took a break to serve as editor-in-chief of both Samhold from 1984 to 1987 and Gudbrandsdølen and Lillehammer Tilskuer from 1984 to 1988. In 1988 he returned to Institute for Journalism, where he was the director from 1989 to 1996. He has also worked as a docent in media studies at Volda University College from 1992. He was then the secretary-general of the Association of Norwegian Editors from 1996 to 2013. He has also been a local historical writer.

In 2014 he was given the Fritt Ord Honorary Award.
