= Anne Sender =

Norwegian lecturer and debater (born 1956)

- Born: 1 November 1956 (age 69); Skien, Norway
- Awards: Fritt Ord Award (2014)

Anne Sender (born 1 November 1956) is a Norwegian lecturer and debater, and a recipient of the Fritt Ord Award.

== Biography ==
Sender was born in Skien on 1 November 1956. She graduated in ballet dance from the Norwegian National Opera and Ballet in 1974, and was running a dance school from 1977 to 1982.

Having converted to Judaism as an adult, she was a board member of the Jewish society in Oslo from 1991 to 2001, and chaired the society from 2005 to 2011. Her books include Vår jødiske reise from 2013. She received the Fritt Ord Award in 2014.

== Selected works ==
- Vår jødiske reise. Oslo: Cappelen Damm. 2013. ISBN 9788202383244. OCLC 1028467107.

Awards
Preceded by Per Fugelli	Recipient of the Fritt Ord Award; 2014	Succeeded by Jan Erik Skog and Robin Schaefer
