= Shabana Rehman Gaarder =

Norwegian comedian and writer (1976–2022)

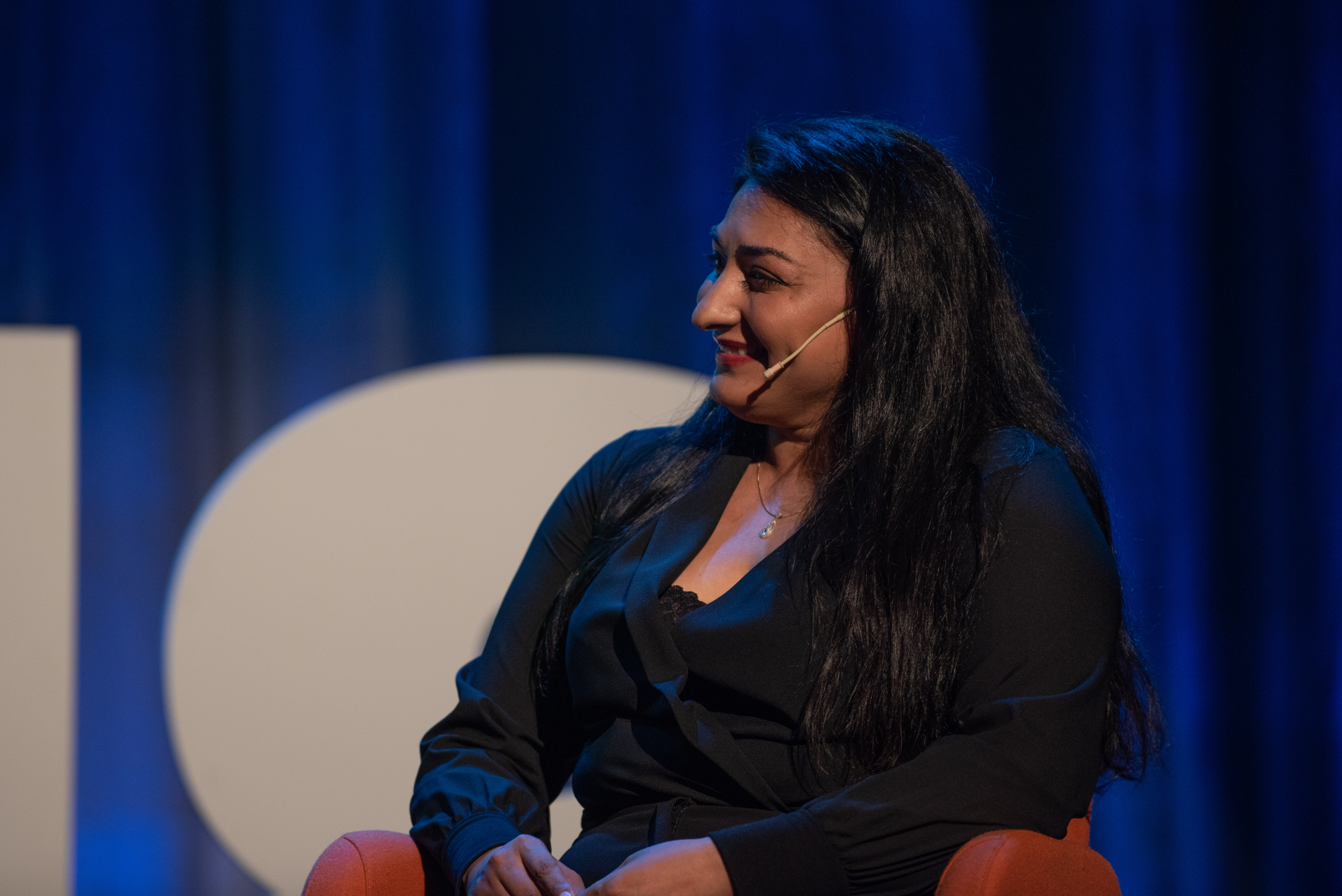
- Rehman in 2018
- Born: 14 July 1976; Karachi, Sindh, Pakistan
- Died: 29 December 2022 (aged 46)
- Known for: stand-up comedy
- Spouse: Martin Gaarder (2008-2022)

Shabana Rehman Gaarder (Urdu: شبانہ رحمان; 14 July 1976 – 29 December 2022) was a Pakistani-born Norwegian stand-up comedian, writer, and columnist. Using her sense of shocking humour on stage and in newspaper columns, she was a controversial voice in discussions on immigration and integration of Muslims in Norway, which has resulted in her persona becoming a subject in itself, which was often referred to as the "Shabana debate".

== Early life ==
One of seven children, Rehman moved with her family to Norway in 1977. Raised as a Muslim, she later identified as a freethinker.

== Professional career ==
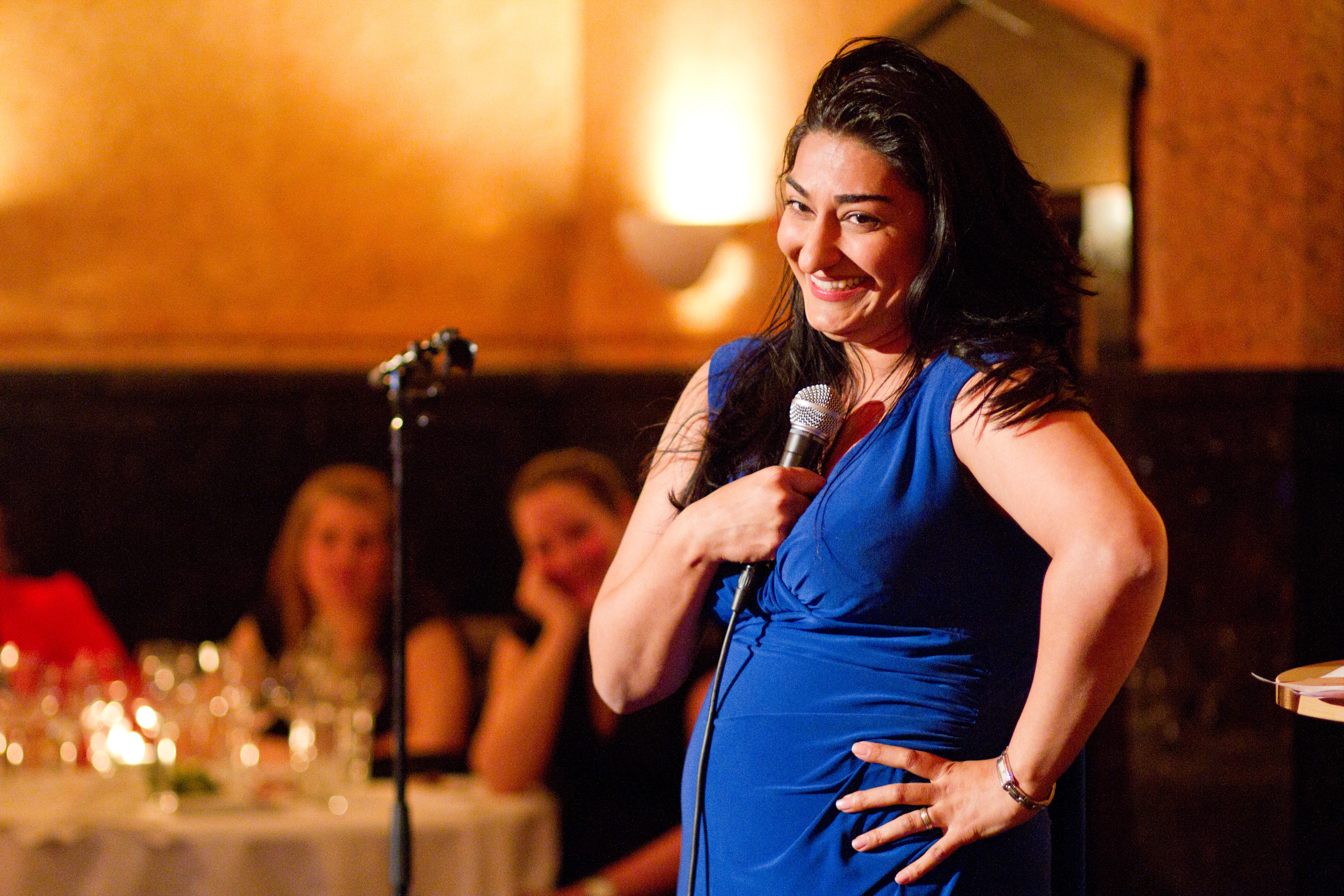
Shabana Rehman Gaarder standup during the Girl Dinner 2011 arranged by Start NHH

Rehman was active in several arenas and was devoted to breaking taboos and creating more openness. Since the early 2000s in general, she urged Muslim immigrants to embrace Western progressive values such as human rights and individual freedom, and that especially women should have the choice to be whoever they want to be, and to do with their own bodies as they please. Liberals sometimes complained about her apparent insensitivity towards immigrant, Muslim attitudes, while conservative Muslims claim that Shabana 'denigrates their religion'. Shabana has alleged that she received death threats, primarily from young immigrants.

Rehman started her career as a columnist in VG in 1996 and debuted as a stand-up comedian in 1999. She later started working as a columnist for Dagbladet in 2000 and regularly wrote for newspapers and magazines.

Rehman received international publicity and has been interviewed by Time Magazine and the New York Times. Her shows have played for full houses in Norway, Denmark, Iceland, and the Faroe Islands. She was fluent in Norwegian, Urdu and English, and has performed in German.

In 2006, Shabana joined the American Comedy Institute in New York City.

== Debate ==
Shabana performing at the London International Conference on Free Expression and Conscience 2017

These are some of the events that have created debate around Rehman's persona. In Scandinavia it is referred to as the "Shabana debate". She had police protection.

Anthropologist Marianne Gullestad accused Rehman of reinforcing stereotypes about Muslims, and making Norwegians think it's ok to discriminate against immigrants.

- 2000 – Posed nude on the cover of Dagbladet with the Norwegian flag painted on her, saying "I take my clothes off to provoke the authoritarians in order to expose them." She simultaneously also posed in traditional Pakistani clothing, explaining that both identities were external to her and that she alone could choose what to be.
- 27 April 2004 - Rehman was granted enormous publicity both in national and international press after lifting Mullah Krekar. The event resulted in a complaint to the police but was later closed with the reasoning: 'there is currently no reasonable ground for the public to search for perpetrations that the public should persecute'. Her own reason for doing this stunt was: A person that can be lifted is not that dangerous.
- 19 March 2005 - In a commentary in Dagbladet, Fødemaskinens fødselsarv (Translated: The birth heritage of the breeding machine) she talked openly about her own abortion.
- 21 August 2005 - Rehman was invited to the opening of the Norwegian International Film Festival and was granted huge press attention after kissing the then cultural minister of Norway Valgerd Svarstad Haugland (Haugland represents the Christian Democrats (KrF) of Norway and has worked extensively towards gay rights). She also flashed her naked bottom saying "I want to show that in Norway, you can do such things without being lynched or arrested."
- 25 August 2005 - Shots were fired at a restaurant owned by Rehman's sister.

== Personal life and death ==
Rehman married writer Dagfinn Nordbø in 2003, the two having initially met on the stand-up circuit in 1999. Tabloid newspaper Dagbladet listed the couple among the country's most influential opinion shapers. After two years of marriage the couple split up as Rehman was moving to the United States for studies. Then in August 2007 the couple announced that they were divorcing though still remaining friends.

In 2008 she married Martin Gaarder, a journalist with the Norwegian Broadcasting Corporation.

Rehman died from pancreatic cancer on 29 December 2022, at the age of 46.

== Awards ==
- 2001 - Lions Clubs International award
- 2002 - Fritt Ord Award (Free Word Award)
- 2022. Ossietzky Award

== See also ==
- Norwegians of Pakistani descent

Awards
Preceded by Nils Christie	Recipient of the Fritt Ord Award; 2002 (shared with Aslam Ahsan)	Succeeded by Berge Furre
