= Blø for drakta =

Campaign set up by the Norwegian Red Cross

Blø for drakta (Norwegian for 'Bleed for the uniform'), also called the Blood League, was a campaign set up by the Norwegian Red Cross to increase the registration of blood donors in Norway, specifically targeting football fans. The campaign ran between 2023 and 2024, from 1 September to 31 December of both years.

== Campaign and history ==
The campaign was launched in autumn 2023, as a collaboration between the Norwegian Red Cross and marketing agency Morgenstern. They initially aimed to recruit 4,000 new blood donors across Norway, but managed to get over 5,400 new people to register during the campaign period. In 2024, that goal was increased to 5,000 new donors, with over 9,700 new people registering to donate blood, including over 2,500 football fans. In 2023, the campaign was shortlisted for the Gullblyanten's diploma and charity categories.

Twenty-one different commercials were made for the campaign, each targeting various football rivalries in Norway across the Eliteserien and Toppserien. Each commercial featured a critically ill man in a hospital bed, when a doctor tells his family he needs blood transfusion to live, but the only blood available is from a fan of a rival football club. The family makes a comment aboht how it was "perhaps the worst thing that could have happened to him", but agrees to go through with it. The commercials would then air where the rival team was the most hated, airing at half-time during football matches, commercial breaks on TV 2, and on the clubs' social media accounts. The commercials have been shortlisted for multiple awards, including the Epica Awards in 2024, where they won silver in the Cultural Insights and Public Interest categories, and the Cannes Lions International Festival of Creativity's Direct Lions award in 2025. It also won two awards in 2025, being the Gullblyanten and the ANFO Annonsørforeningen Effect awards.

== Competition ==
To incentivize football fans to sign up, whenever someone registered as a new blood donor, they could choose the football club in Norway they support. For every new donor, that team was given a point in the Blodtabellen (English: Blood Table), an online leaderboard tracking registrations. Each team started with zero registrations on 1 September, with the winner being the team with the most supporters who sign up to become new donors during the campaign period.

=== Winners ===
- 2023: Tromsø IL
- 2024: Rosenborg BK
