= Jan Erik Skog =

Jan Erik Skog (born 1945) is a Norwegian electrician, trade unionist and whistleblower. He received the Fritt Ord Award in 2015, shared with Robin Schaefer.

Awards
Preceded by Anne Sender	Recipient of the Fritt Ord Award shared with Robin Schaefer; 2015	Succeeded by Robert Mood
