= Tom Martinsen =

Norwegian photographer

- Born: 4 August 1943; Tønsberg, Norway
- Died: 31 March 2007 (aged 63)
- Occupation: Photographer
- Employer: Dagbladet
- Awards: Fritt Ord Honorary Award for (2006)

Tom Martinsen (1943–2007) was a Norwegian photographer.

Born in Tønsberg on 4 August 1943, Martinsen studied photography with Christer Strömholm in Stockholm, and was appointed as reporting photographer for the newspaper Dagbladet from 1973. He was a co-founder of the Oslo gallery Fotogalleriet in 1977. His publications include the book 118 øyeblikk from 2003.

Martinsen was awarded the Fritt Ord Honorary Award in 2006.
