= Grethe Johnsen =

Norwegian Red Cross worker

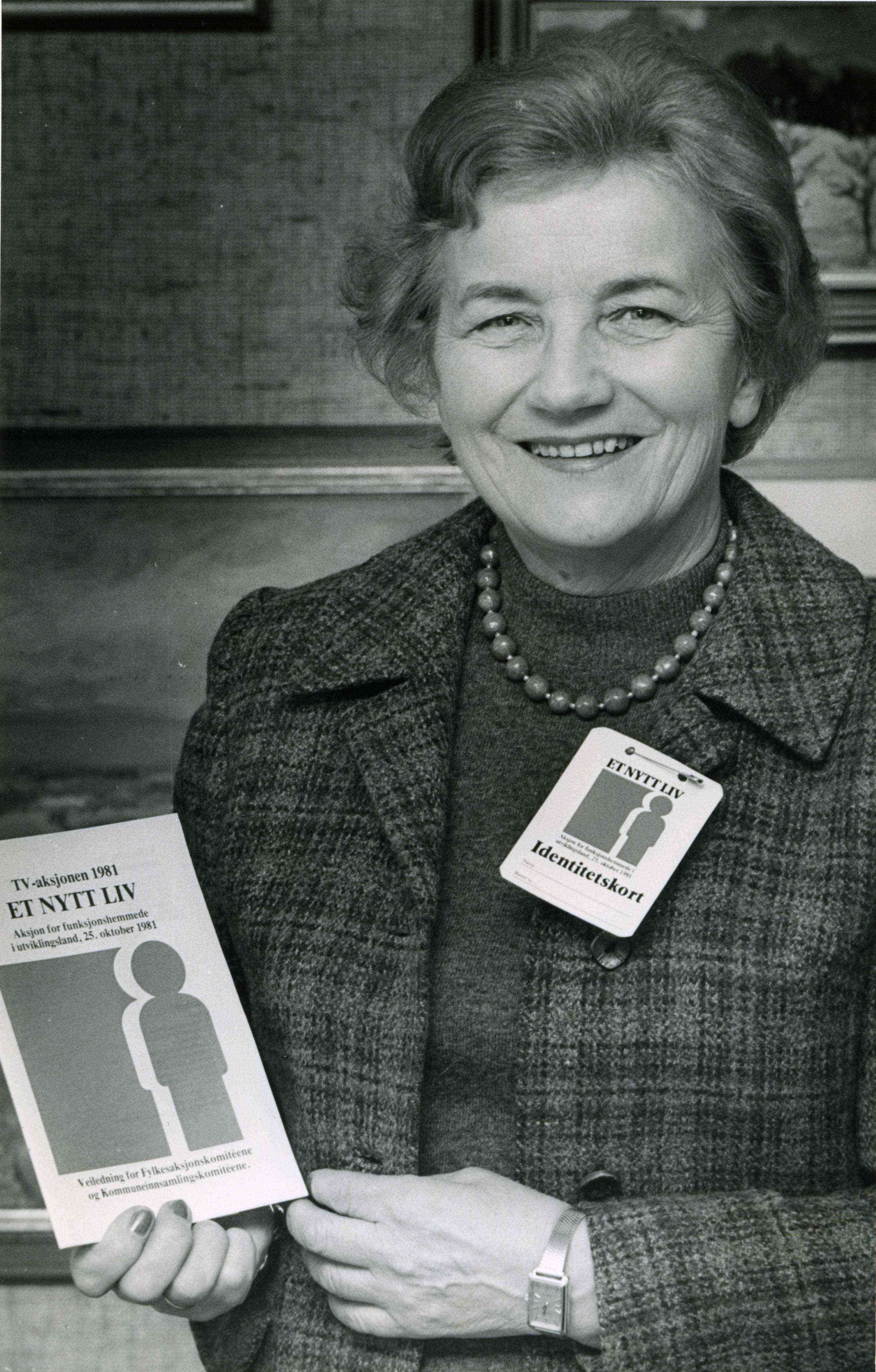
Image of Grethe Helene Johnsen

Grethe Helene Johnsen, born Middelthon (1915 – 19 May 2014) was a Norwegian organizational worker.

She was born in Kalvøy outside of Stavanger, and moved to the city at the age of twelve. She became active in the Norwegian Red Cross at an early age, and became its first female president in 1975.

She was decorated with the King's Medal of Merit in gold in 1976 and the Order of St. Olav (Knight, First Class) in 1982, and received honorary membership in the Norwegian Red Cross in 1993.

She survived her husband and one daughter, but still had two children when she died in May 2014.
