= Norwegian Red Cross =

Norwegian humanitarian organization

- Norges Røde Kors
- Formation: 22 September 1865; 160 years ago
- Founder: Frederik Stang
- Purpose: Humanitarian Aid
- Headquarters: Oslo, Norway
- Region served: Norway
- President: Robert Mood
- Website: rodekors.no

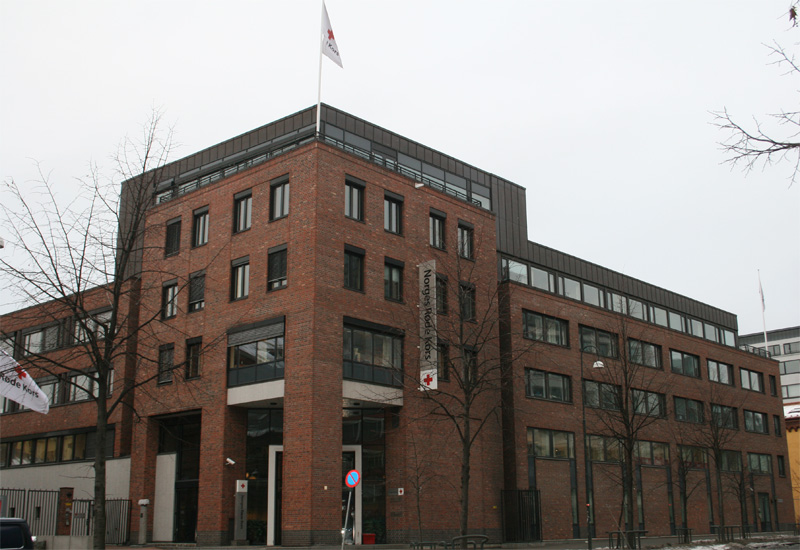
Office building of the Norwegian Red Cross in Oslo

The Norwegian Red Cross (Norwegian: Norges Røde Kors) was founded on 22 September 1865 by prime minister Frederik Stang. In 1895 the Norwegian Red Cross began educating nurses, and in 1907 the Norwegian Ministry of Defence authorized the organization for voluntary medical aid in war. The Norwegian Red Cross was one of the first national organizations in the International Red Cross.

The organization now has 150,000 members and provides a variety of humanitarian services, including care for old and the infirm, prisoner visits, outdoor rescue, and international work.

In 2023, they launched the Blø for drakta (English: Bleed for the shirt) campaign to increase the registration of blood donors in the country, specifically targeting football fans.

== Presidents ==
- 1865–1880 Frederik Stang
- 1880–1889 Christian August Selmer
- 1889–1905 Johan Fredrik Thaulow
- 1905–1908 Ernst Motzfeldt
- 1908–1912 Andreas Martin Seip
- 1912–1913 Christian Wilhelm Engel Bredal Olssøn
- 1913–1917 Hans Jørgen Darre-Jenssen
- 1917–1922 Hieronymus Heyerdahl
- 1922–1930 Torolf Prytz
- 1930–1940 Jens Meinich
- 1940–1945 Fridtjof Heyerdahl
- 1945–1947 Nikolai Nissen Paus
- 1947–1957 Erling Steen
- 1957–1966 Ulf Styren
- 1966–1975 Torstein Dale
- 1975 Grethe Johnsen (acting)
- 1975–1981 Hans Høegh
- 1981–1987 Bjørn Egge
- 1987–1993 Bjørn Bruland
- 1993–1998 Astrid Nøklebye Heiberg
- 1999–2008 Thorvald Stoltenberg
- 2008–2018 Sven Mollekleiv
- 2018–2020 Robert Mood
- 2020–2023 Thor Inge Sveinsvoll
- Since 2023 Siri Hatlen

== See also ==
- Norwegian Red Cross Search and Rescue Corps
