= Bjørn Vassnes =

Norwegian musician and writer (born 1951)

Bjørn Roar Vassnes (born 16 November 1951) is a Norwegian musician and writer.

He started the folk rock group Erter, Kjøtt og Flesk with Jens Harald Eilertsen in Tromsø in 1972, and was the guitar player for the band. After one LP in 1973 the band dissolved. In Bergen in 1979 he started the ska-inspired band Nøkken with Turid Pedersen.

He has later made a career as a popular conveyor of natural sciences. He co-founded the science television program Schrödingers katt (named after Schrödinger's cat) on the Norwegian Broadcasting Corporation. He has also been a science journalist and periodicalist. For this he was awarded the Fritt Ord Honorary Award in 2010.
