= Humanist (disambiguation) =

Humanist may refer to:

- A proponent or practitioner of humanism, which has several distinct senses, listed at:
  - Humanism (disambiguation)
- A scholar or academic in the humanities
- Humanist, more precisely humanist minuscule, a style of handwriting that developed in 15th-century Italy; inspired the typefaces below
- Humanist, a typeface class under the Vox-ATypI classification, which may refer to:
  - Humanist sans-serif typefaces
  - Humanist or old-style serif typefaces
- Humanist (electronic seminar), an email discussion list on international "humanities computing and the digital humanities"
- The Humanist (journal), a periodical published by the American Humanist Association
- Humanist (journal), a periodical published by the Norwegian Humanist Association
- Humanist (band), British collaborative musical project

== See also ==
- Humanist Christianity, a philosophy that combines Christian ethics and humanist principles
  - Renaissance humanist, a humanistic scholar during the European Renaissance (14th–16th centuries)
- Humanist Democratic Centre (Centre Démocrate Humaniste), a former Christian-democratic, centrist political party in Belgium
- Humanist education, an approach to education based on the work of humanistic psychologists
- Humanist International, consortium of humanist-movement political parties
- Humanist Judaism, a Jewish cultural movement that offers a non-theistic alternative to traditional Judaism
- Humanist Manifesto, a series of documents (1933, 1973, 2003) outlining humanist principles
- Humanist Marxism, a more liberal form of Marxism
- Humanist Movement, an international volunteer organisation linked to Mario "Silo" Rodriguez Cobos; sometimes referred to as New Humanism or Siloism
- Humanist psychology, a psychological approach that combines elements of holism, mindfulness, and behavioral therapy
- Humanistic (album), the 2001 debut album by Abandoned Pools
