= Svein Ellingsen =

Norwegian painter (1929–2020)

- Born: 13 July 1929; Kongsberg, Norway
- Died: 5 April 2020 (aged 90)
- Education: Norwegian National Academy of Craft and Art Industry; Norwegian National Academy of Fine Arts
- Occupations: Visual artist and hymnist
- Awards: Fritt Ord Honorary Award (1992); Order of St. Olav (1995)

Svein Ørnulf Ellingsen (13 July 1929 – 5 April 2020) was a Norwegian visual artist and hymnist.

== Biography ==
Ellingsen was born in Kongsberg to Fritz Frølich Ellingsen and Karoline Enge. His books include the poetry collections Det skjulte nærvær and Noen må våke, both from 1978, the children's book Regler, rim og revestreker from 1986, and the poetry collections Vårt øye ser mot Betlehem (1987) and Det finnes en dyrebar rose (1989). The hymnal Norsk salmebok 2013 has included 58 of his hymns, including fifteen translations. He received the Fritt Ord Honorary Award in 1992, and was decorated Knight, First Class of the Order of St. Olav in 1995.

He died on 5 April 2020.
