= Randi Karlstrøm =

Norwegian politician (born 1960)

Randi Karlstrøm (born 25 June 1960 in Tinn Municipality) is a Norwegian politician for the Christian Democratic Party.

She was elected to the Norwegian Parliament from Finnmark in 1997, but was not re-elected in 2001.

Karlstrøm was a member of the municipal council of Alta Municipality from 1987 to 1991, and of the Finnmark county council for two months in 1991.
