= Ulf Styren =

Norwegian businessperson

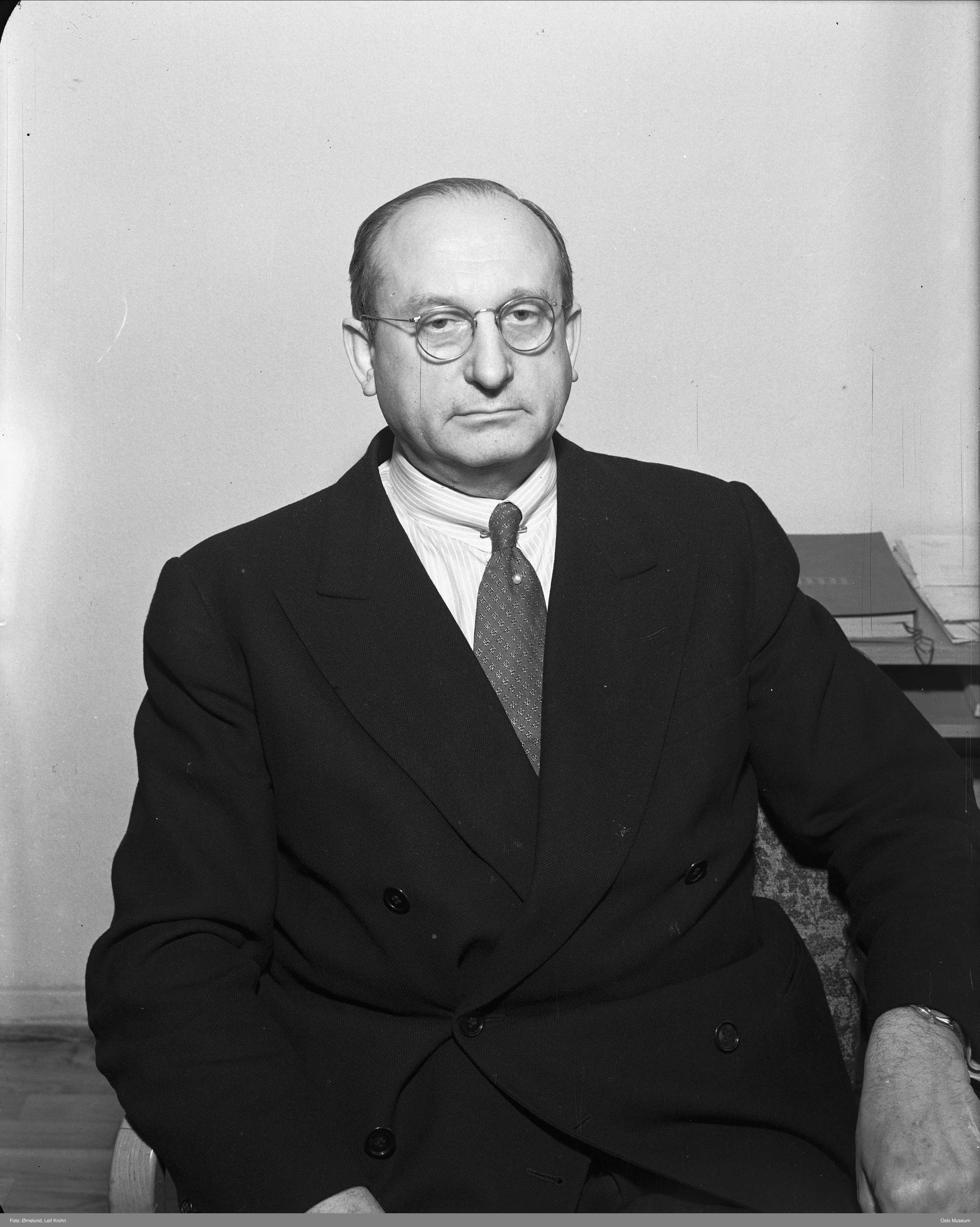

Ulf Styren (4 April 1890 – 20 December 1974) was a Norwegian businessperson.

He was born in Kristiania as a son of treasurer M. H. Styren (1846–1917) and Inga Othilie Johannessen (1866–1946). In 1916 he married Laila Elisabeth Camilla Gulbranson, a daughter of Hans Peter Francis Gulbranson and Ellen Gulbranson (née Norgren).

He graduated as a machine engineer. He manager the glass works Drammens Glasverk from 1915 to 1930 and Oxelösund Glasbruk from 1930 to 1933. In 1933 he became chief executive of Askim Gummivarefabrik, and from 1937 Den Norske Kalosje- og Gummivarefabrik and Vestlandske Gummivarefabrik. In 1947 he became chief executive of Norsk Jernverk, serving as director-general from 1955 to 1958.

He chaired the board of Grand Hotel and was a board member of Emaljeverket, Goodwill Produkter, Pallas Norsk Forsikringsselskap, Radioindustri and Automatindustri. He chaired the supervisory council of Pallas Norsk Forsikringsselskap and was a supervisory council member of Bergens Privatbank. From 1957 to 1966 he was the president of the Norwegian Red Cross. Upon leaving he was proclaimed an honorary member.

He was decorated as a Knight, First Class of Order of St. Olav (1958) and the Order of the Yugoslav Flag, Knight of the Order of the Lion of Finland, the Order of Vasa, and also received the Order of Merit of Austria. He died in December 1974 and was buried at Vestre gravlund.
