= Vivian Knarvik Bugge =

Norwegian politician (born 1960)

Vivian Knarvik Bugge (born 17 January 1960) is a Norwegian politician for the Christian Democratic Party.

She served as a deputy representative to the Parliament of Norway from Telemark during the term 1997–2001. In total, she met during 14 days of parliamentary session.
