= Bjørn Bruland =

Norwegian admiral and politician (1926–2014)

Personal details
- Born: Bjørn Rochmann Bruland; 13 October 1926 Rjukan, Norway
- Died: 3 July 2014 (aged 87)
- Party: Labour Party

Military service
- Allegiance: Norway
- Branch/service: Royal Norwegian Navy
- Years of service: 1945–1986
- Rank: Rear admiral

Bjørn Rochmann Bruland (13 October 1926 – 3 July 2014) was a Norwegian admiral and politician for the Labour Party.

He was born in Rjukan and started his career in the Royal Norwegian Navy in 1945 after taking his education at the Norwegian Naval Academy, also serving in the British and US navies and under the Supreme Allied Commander Atlantic. He reached the rank of rear admiral.

Bruland led the Norwegian Naval Training Establishment "HNoMS Tordenskjold" and the naval camp at Madla, "HNoMS Harald Hårfagre" and served as director of the Norwegian Defence University College. In the diplomacy, he served as defence attaché in Yugoslavia and Austria. He was also a State Secretary in the Ministry of Defence during the closing years of Nordli's Cabinet, from 1979 to 1981, and in the short-lived Brundtland's First Cabinet of 1981. He retired from the armed forces in 1986.

Bruland has been chairman of United World Colleges in Norway and served as president of the Norwegian Red Cross from 1987 to 1993.

Bruland lived in over twenty places in his life, last in Stavanger. He died in 2014.
