= Niels Christian Geelmuyden =

Norwegian journalist and writer (born 1960)

Niels Christian Geelmuyden (born 18 December 1960) is a Norwegian journalist and writer, mostly known for his interviews and essays.

Geelmuyden grew up in Lysaker as a younger brother of Hans Geelmuyden. They were nephews of the writer Hans Geelmuyden. The Geelmuyden name is traced back to Dutch immigrants in the 1600s. Niels Christian Geelmuyden attended local schools before getting the cand.polit. degree in political science at the University of Oslo.

Geelmuyden was a columnist in the conservative newspapers and periodicals Morgenbladet, Farmand and Tidens Tegn. He mostly became known for his biographical portraits in interview form, which were mostly printed in Kapital and collected in several books. By 2016, the number of interviews had approached 600. Geelmuyden also wrote for other outlets, notably a 1993 portrait of Prime Minister Gro Harlem Brundtland for Det Nye. Growing frustrated with Brundtland's way of handling the media and her elusive verbal style, Geelmuyden decided to quote her exactly as she replied, which appeared wholly incoherent in print. The Office of the Prime Minister refused and Det Nye printed a "sanitized" version, prompting Kapital to print the "real" version.

In 2007, he received the Fritt Ord Honorary Award. Geelmuyden proceeded to write several critical books about the food industry. The first two were Sannheten på bordet (2013) and Sannheten i glasset (2015), regarding safety and additives in food and drink respectively. Pillebefinnende (2017) regarded the increased consumption of nutritional and medicinal pills.

Geelmuyden resides in Tjøme.
