= Brynjar Aa =

Norwegian dramatist (born 1960)

- Born: 21 July 1960 (age 66); Trondheim
- Occupation: Dramatist
- Writing career
- Pen name: Brynjar Å

Brynjar Aa often Brynjar Å (born 21 July 1960) is a Norwegian dramatist. He was born in Trondheim. He was a student at the Telemark University College and studied under Norwegian writer Eldrid Lunden. Before finishing at Bø, Aa published the book Babyboy.

Brynjar Aa has published over a dozen different works, all by established publishing houses, including Aschehoug, and The NRK. His work has also been reviewed in Dag og Tid and Dagbladet, and some of them have been controversial.

== Bibliography ==
- 1981 Tjukken
- 1982 Gords barn
- 1983 Babyboy
- 1986 Clæsh
- 1987 Flipper; Clæsh; Syx
- 1999 Trondheim eller Det evangeliske, eventyrlige og smått dileriske stevet om en reise til NidaRus inkl. Epilog
- 1999 Schlappz
