= Thomas Christian Wyller =

Norwegian academic (1922–2012)

- Born: 16 September 1922; Stavanger, Norway
- Died: 24 April 2012 (aged 89)
- Occupation: Political scientist

Thomas Christian Wyller (16 September 1922 – 24 April 2012) was a professor of political science at the University of Oslo. He is regarded as one of the founders of political science as an academic discipline in Norway, and his area of interest was modern political history.

== Early and personal life ==
Wyller was born in Stavanger, as a son of barrister Trygve Christian Wyller (1888–1960) and Anne Kathrine Dons (1891–1982). He is a brother of philosopher Egil A. Wyller. His father was Nacht und Nebel prisoner in Germany.

== Career ==
Wyller finished his secondary education in 1941, and enrolled at the University of Oslo as a student of philology. Being involved in resistance work, he was arrested in August 1942 (underground newspapers) and transferred to the concentration camp Grini where he stayed until the war ended in May 1945. During his stay at Grini, he passed an examination in Latin with best possible result, with professor of philology Eiliv Skard as examinator, and Francis Bull as censor, both professors being long-term camp detainees. Wyller was involved in the secret news service inside the camp, where news from London Radio was distributed to the prisoners. In 2002 he published the book W/25X. Motstandskampen på Grini, about the resistance work at Grini. W and 25 X was the code name for the outside and inside espionage leaders, respectively, and 25 X was also used as codename for the espionage group inside the camp. Shortly after the war, Wyller was a member of the group of former Grini prisoners who started the magazine Ungdom!, Wyller being one of the editors.

In the 1950s Wyller did research on the history of Norway during the occupation. He wrote the book Fra okkupasjonstidens maktkamp in 1953. Nyordning og motstand from 1958 is his doctoral thesis on Norwegian organisations during the attempts of nazification during the first years of the German occupation of Norway. When Wyller received his dr.philos. degree in 1958, this was the first doctorate in political science in Norway.

Wyller was chairman for Norsk statsvitenskapelig forening from 1958 to 1961. He was appointed professor at the University of Oslo in 1968, and held this position until his retirement in 1992. He died on 24 April 2012.

== Selected works ==
- Vilje og visjon (in Norwegian). 1989.
- W/25X. Motstandskampen på Grini (in Norwegian). 2002.
