= Humanism (disambiguation) =

Humanism may refer to ethical philosophies or life stances such as:

- Secular humanism, embraces humanism while rejecting religious aspects
- Religious humanism, an integration of humanist philosophy with religious, nontheistic rituals and beliefs
  - Humanistic Judaism, a movement in Judaism that offers a nontheistic alternative in contemporary Jewish life
  - Christian humanism, a philosophy that combines Christian ethics and humanist principles

Humanism may also refer to:

- Renaissance humanism, an intellectual movement based on reviving Greek and Roman knowledge
- Classical humanism, the cultivation of Greco-Roman legacies (not limited to Renaissance times)
- Civic humanism, a form of republicanism inspired by the writings of classical antiquity
- Humanism (philosophy of education), a theory based on generation of knowledge, meaning and expertise
- Humanities, a group of academic disciplines and the educational philosophy associated with them
- Pragmatism, in the terminology of F.S.C. Schiller
- Marxist humanism, a more liberal form of Marxism
- Neohumanism, a holistic philosophical theory elaborated by Prabhat Ranjan Sarkar
- New humanism (literature), a literary criticism term associated with Irving Babbitt and Paul Elmer More

== See also ==
- Humanism
- Humanist (disambiguation)
