= Sara Azmeh Rasmussen =

Sara Mats Azmeh Rasmussen is a Syrian-Norwegian author, freelance writer, lecturer and human rights activist. She was born in 1973 and grew up in Damascus, Syria, in a Sunni Muslim family with deep roots in the capital. In 1995 she immigrated alone to Norway, and in 1997 she was granted political asylum. She was later granted Swedish citizenship.

In her first book, the autobiographical novel, Skyggeferden (The journey of a shadow, ebook: ISBN 9788282820233), she describes the deep impact of her cultural journey. Azmeh Rasmussen's journey was not only cultural but also politically ideological and religious. Her conversion from Islam to Christianity took place in Damascus, and she was baptized even at the risk of her life. A few years later, she became a secular humanist.

== Academic background ==
Sara Azmeh Rasmussen studied law at the University of Damascus. She has a candidatus magister in international cultural studies, Islam and Arabic culture, at the University of Oslo. As a student in Oslo in the West Asia and North Africa program, she was connected to the Center for Studies of the Holocaust and Religious Minorities, and she also studied moral philosophy and gender studies.

== Fascism and anti-Semitism ==
For three years as a young university student, Azmeh Rasmussen was a member of the far-right Syrian Social Nationalist Party (SSNP), which she believed posed solutions to social problems and provided her with a sense of community. She left the party when she was 20.

She has become a commentator on anti-Semitism. At a lecture she gave at the annual conference for the organization With Israel for Peace (MIFF), she talked about two forms of anti-Semitism in West Asia: political (secular) and religious. She also spoke of the demonization of Jews in Arab and Muslim culture.

In 2012, she reopened the debate about an anti-Semitic book on sale in the Islamic Association's bookstore in Oslo. She claimed that its content was just as dehumanizing as Hitler's anti-Semitic propaganda and demanded that the book be removed from the shelves. The leader of the Islamic Association answered that the book should be read in the context of the political conflict. In response, Azmeh Rasmussen read a few lines from the book on a live television debate. "All countries shun Jews as the sick shun his illness" was an example.

== Freedom of expression ==
Azmeh Rasmussen has been involved in the debate around freedom of expression since 2006, when she participated in a debate arranged between Norwegian cartoonists together with Flemming Rose, the editor of the Danish newspaper, Jyllandsposten.

Periodically, she has challenged demands for censorship through cartoons and paintings. During the period of unrest that prevailed in France after the satirical magazine Charlie Hebdo published drawings of Muhammad, Azmeh Rasmussen expressed her full support for the magazine's editorial choices. She published her own cartoon with the text: "If you don't like to be drawn, cover yourself with a veil, prophet!" In the cartoon the Muslim prophet stands beside three women, one of them unveiled and with hairy legs. Since Azmeh Rasmussen did not find a medium in Norway that was willing to publish the cartoon, she started a blog where she laid out the artwork and two explaining articles, one in Norwegian and one in Arabic. In Norwegian media this was reported without publishing the cartoon, but in France, it was published in various newspapers and websites.

The day after the 2015 terrorist attack on the Charlie Hebdo offices, Azmeh Rasmussen hung up copies of her prophet drawing around in Stockholm and wrote the following on her blog "I am Charlie, you will be drawn, prophet!"

In 2013 she painted a version of The Scream, the world-famous painting by Edvard Munch, in which God is screaming in front of a background of Arab flags and a crescent. Two female figures dressed in black veils stand in a static position. In the sea, a man wearing red trunks swims on his back.

Azmeh Rasmussen posted a hundred copies of the cartoon on both sides of the entrance to the Stockholm Central Mosque. At the same time, she sent a video letter to major Islamic centers and universities in the world "God is screaming in the Middle East", in which she called for new interpretations that liberate women from pre-modern patriarchal norms. She described the edict to wear the veil as a misinterpretation of a single verse of the Qur'an. She also criticized marginalizing worship practices where women have to go through the side doors and pray in the gallery behind the curtains, while men go through the front door and pray in the mosque's large main hall.

Despite the fact that Azmeh Rasmussen and the Somali author Ayaan Hirsi Ali share the same ideological secular ground, she has criticized sharply Hirsi Ali's views on putting legal limits on European Muslims' religious life. In 2013, Azmeh Rasmussen organized a night watch outside an Oslo mosque in response to threats against several mosques. The symbolic action did not get any attention from the media. Azmeh Rasmussen explained in her blog that one should not confuse criticism of religion with hatred towards a religious group. She considered protecting the mosques, not only as physical buildings, but also, as symbolic anchors for a social group, as essential in a democracy.

== Solo-activism for Muslim women, homosexuals, and transgender peoples' rights ==
Azmeh Rasmussen became well known in Norway when she set fire to a veil on International Women's Day 2009. The campaign gained international attention and coverage. The day before, the newspaper Aftenposten published her article "Spread your wings", an open letter to Muslim women. During the symbolic action, Azmeh Rasmussen was bombarded with snowballs. She subsequently received death threats and hate emails.

On 29 January 2011, she started a one-woman protest outside the building of the Islamic Council Norway, an umbrella organization for Muslim communities, and demanded a clear condemnation on the death penalty for homosexuality. She sat on the footpath from morning to evening in minus degrees with a poster with the text: 'Freedom and dignity for gay and transgender people" written in both Norwegian and Arabic. On the third day, she started a hunger strike.

During the protest, Azmeh Rasmussen was threatened, had stones thrown at her during a TV interview on NRK, and had food waste and garbage thrown over her head during an interview for the blog Religioner.no. Shortly before Friday prayers, members of the congregation put up roadblocks and signs and forced her to move some distance away so she was no longer in direct contact with the wall of the mosque, citing falling snow as a safety hazard. On the fifth day of the protest, the Secretary-General of the Islamic Council, Mehtab Afsar, agreed to have a conversation with her, but not in an office in the same building as the mosque. The conversation took place at a nearby restaurant and the two reached a compromise.

In the summer of 2011, the fight for Muslim gay and transgender people's rights took Azmeh Rasmussen to Dublin, Ireland.

After an unsuccessful attempt to convince representatives for LGBT organizations in Scandinavia to send a joint letter to the Dublin-based European Council for Fatwa and Research, Azmeh Rasmussen traveled to the council's annual conference with a letter she wrote herself. In her letter, she called for a theological interpretation that guarantees the right to life and security for gay Muslims. She delivered the letter to the Secretary-General of the council but was denied access to the Islamic Cultural Center where the conference was held. She responded by sitting outside the main entrance for the 5 days of the conference with a placard with the text: "Homosexuals are not criminals. Put an end to killing of innocents." After Friday prayers, Azmeh Rasmussen was bullied, her placard was torn to pieces, a car tried to run her down, and she had to call an emergency number.

Azmeh Rasmussen has on many occasions condemned homophobic laws in Russia and the Orthodox Church. During the Olympic Games in Sochi, Russia, she held a protest outside the Russian Embassy in Stockholm, knitting scarves in rainbow colors, displaying a rainbow flag with "Russia needs freedom, love, and rainbow" on it, and a poster with "Keep smiling my friend. I'll be on your side" written on it. Beside the basket with yarn, she placed a traditional matryoshka doll with a rainbow scarf around its neck.

== Free speech award ==
In 2012, Azmeh Rasmussen received a Fritt Ord prize supporting freedom of expression. At the awards ceremony, the Chair of the Fritt Ord Foundation, Georg Fredrik Rieber-Mohn, highlighted her important and constructive role in the public debate in Norway. He stressed that she had been consistent, logical, and rational in her public contributions.

== Media criticism ==
In 2013, Azmeh Rasmussen put conditions for freelancers and cultural workers on the public agenda in Norway. She warned of the consequences of the trend towards fewer owners controlling more of the media system: a weakened democracy and less diversity in the media. She warned of the consequences of "dumping fees" for highly educated and professional freelancers, using herself as an example – she could not afford to live whilst working as a freelancer and was therefore obliged to leave the public debate – and that the media and cultural institutions risk losing valuable human resources. She refused to pay her tax for 2012 unless the politicians put the conditions for freelancers on the agenda.

The Norwegian professional journalist's magazine Journalisten suggested that Azmeh Rasmussen be awarded a state grant. The magazine's editor, Helge Øgrim, was critical of the Norwegian media's silence and choice to ignore her criticism. Arguing for a government scholarship, he wrote: "It would be a failure for Norwegian media and cultural life if we lose her." Many signed the campaign, but Azmeh Rasmussen rejected any grant even before the process had begun in the parliament because she argued that she was seeking common solutions to a serious situation in the media industry, not complaining about her own situation.

Azmeh Rasmussen conducted a protest outside the NRK buildings that lasted for five days without any attention from NRK or the largest media. She dressed in rags, had the word "freelancer" written on her chest, and expressed her criticism through a painting. In the painting, dollar bills were glued on a blue background, the logo for the commercial media group Schibsted was depicted as a competition horse, NRK was standing outside the scene, and an anonymous hand was holding a placard with the declaration "Be a weathercock". A few months earlier, Azmeh Rasmussen conducted a protest outside the headquarters of Schibsted with the text: "Freedom of Press in Norway is not for sale on the American Stock Exchange!"

In 2014, as she was not receiving attention from large media for her media criticism, Sara Azmeh Rasmussen decided to abandon the Norwegian public debate for good. She accused the Norwegian media of double standards and hypocrisy and the political and cultural elite for being too passive. In her last article in the Norwegian language, she described her feelings of disappointment in discovering that she had been a part of a circus show, not a genuine democratic public debate.

A response to these accusations was published in Journalisten – in which her reaction was described as too personal and unbalanced. The editors explained that her media protests did not have any news value for readers/listeners and viewers.

In 2014, she applied for Swedish citizenship. She has lived in Stockholm since 2008.
