= 1962 in Norway =

- Centuries: 18th; 19th; 20th; 21st
- Decades: 1940s; 1950s; 1960s; 1970s; 1980s
- See also: List of years in Norway

Events in the year 1962 in Norway.

== Incumbents ==
- Monarch – Olav V.
- Prime Minister – Einar Gerhardsen (Labour Party)

== Events ==
- Phillips Petroleum apply for exploration rights in the Norwegian North Sea, offering a high fee. The Norwegian authorities decide to involve multiple companies in exploration.
- 7 June – The Nordland Line between Trondheim and Bodø was opened.
- 21 October – Hurtigruten passenger ship MS Sanct Svithun running between Bergen and Kirkenes goes in the northbound Hurtigruten, sank during a stormy night after running aground off her normal course, resulting in the deaths of 41 while 48 survived the event.
- 5 November – 21 workers were killed in a mine accident in the Kongsfjorden in Svalbard.
- 21 December – Rondane National Park is established as Norway's first national park.

== Notable births ==
=== January ===
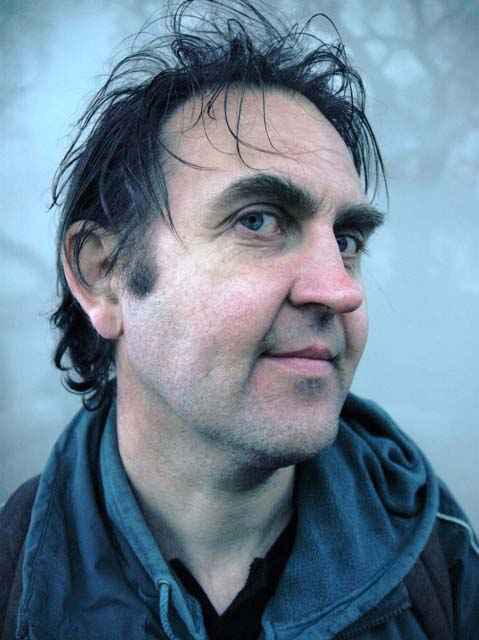
Svein Nyhus

- 13 January – Tor Heiestad, sport shooter.
- 19 January – Erling Landsværk, sailor.
- 23 January
  - Egil Nyhus, illustrator and editorial cartoonist.
  - Svein Nyhus, illustrator and children's writer.
- 25 January – Kari Kjønaas Kjos, politician.
- 28 January – Brit Bildøen, writer.

=== February ===
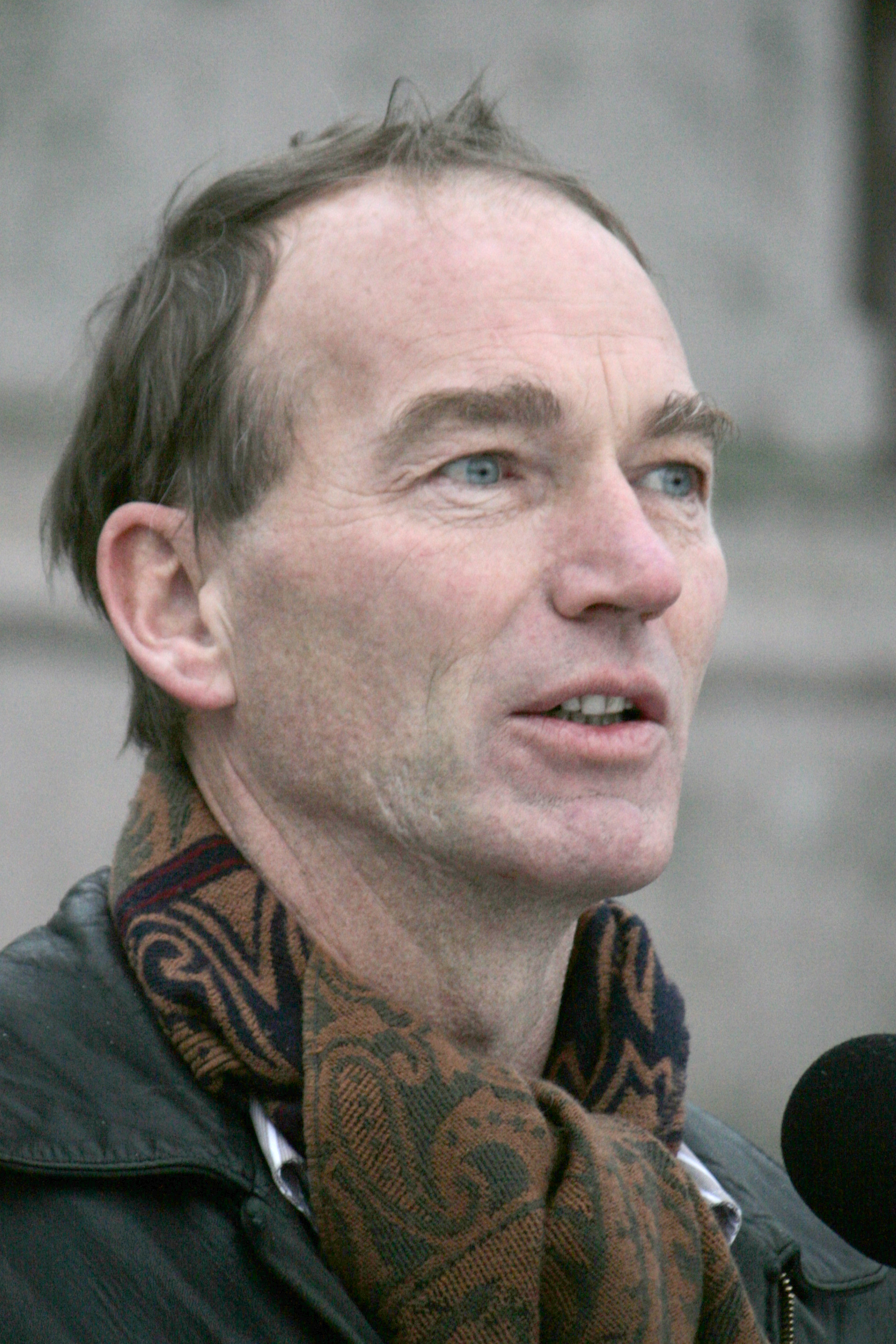
Thomas Hylland Eriksen

- 4 February – Håvard Syvertsen, writer.
- 6 February – Thomas Hylland Eriksen, social anthropologist (died 2024).
- 12 February – Stig-Arne Gunnestad, curler.
- 20 February – Marius Voigt, ice hockey player.
- 25 February – Elin Ørjasæter, organizational leader, children's writer, columnist, and non-fiction writer.
- 26 February – Bent Svele, handball player, coach and sports reporter.

=== March ===
- 2 March – Tom Nordlie, football coach.
- 5 March – Håvard Tveite, orienteering competitor (died 2021).
- 11 March – Kjell Berg, curler.
- 14 March – Vetle Vinje, competition rower.
- 19 March – Jenny Ellaug Følling, politician.
- 27 March – Espen Thorsen, rower.
- 30 March – Marianne S. Bjorøy, politician.

=== April ===
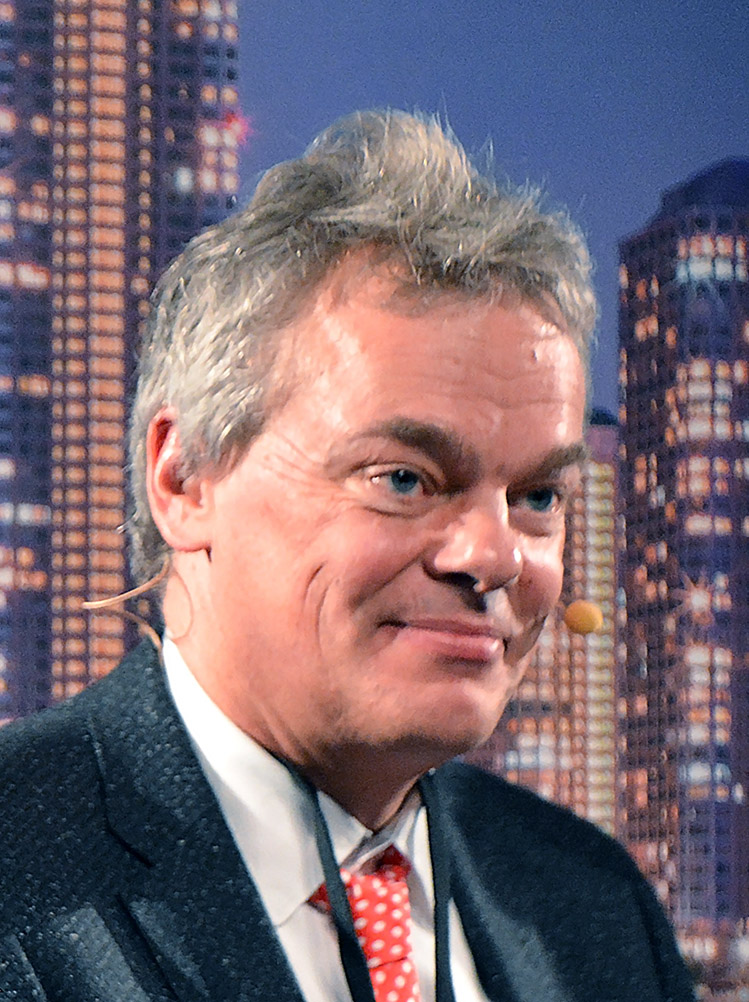
Edvard Moser

- 5 April –
  - Bente Engesland, magazine editor
  - Arild Monsen, cross-country skier.
- 19 April
  - Pål Trulsen, curler.
  - Trine Trulsen Vågberg, curler.
- 22 April – Anne Aasheim, editor (died 2016).
- 25 April – Ole Edvard Antonsen, trumpeter.
- 27 April – Edvard Moser, professor of psychology and neuroscience.
- 29 April – Henning Kramer Dahl, poet, essayist and translator (died 2017).

=== May ===
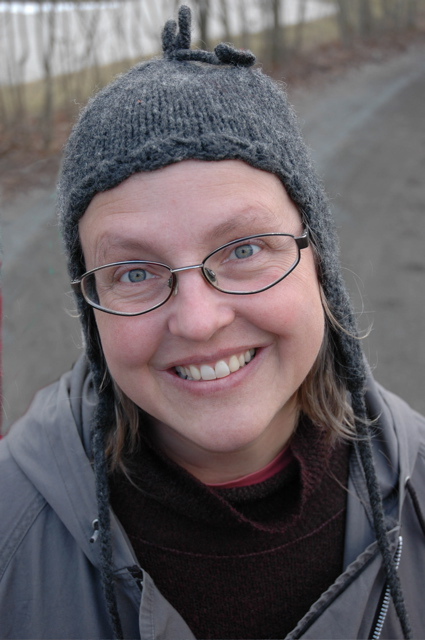
Gro Dahle

- 4 May
  - Eli Arnstad, politician.
  - Marit Arnstad, lawyer and politician
- 10 May – Arne Lyngstad, politician (died 2019).
- 15 May – Gro Dahle, poet and writer
- 18 May – Alf van der Hagen, journalist and newspaper editor.
- 21 May – Hege Storhaug, journalist and writer.
- 31 May – Børge Ousland, adventurer.

=== June ===
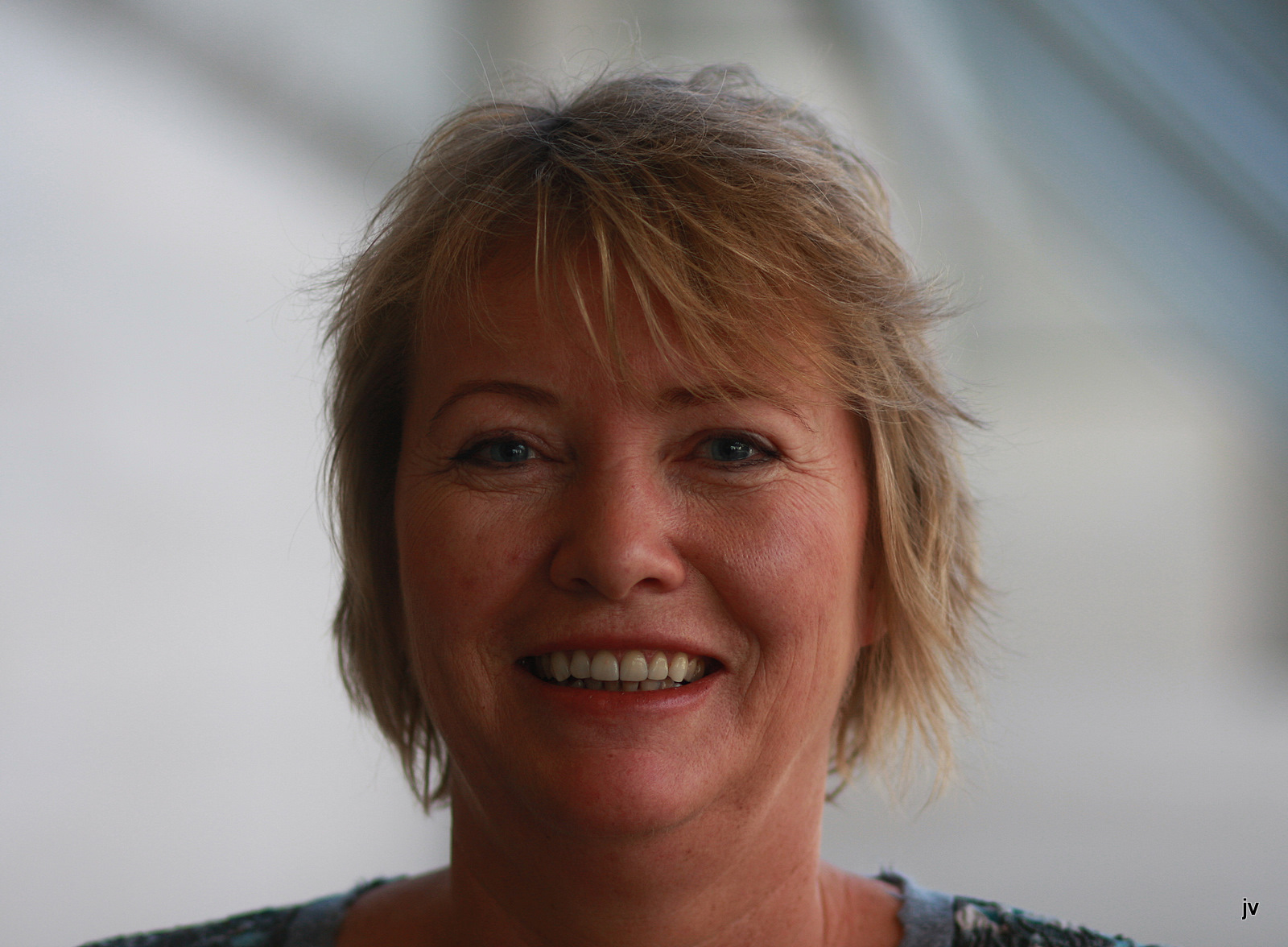
Marie Simonsen

- 1 June – Marie Simonsen, journalist and editor.
- 6 June – Tor Arne Bell Ljunggren, politician.
- 12 June – Petter Skarheim, civil servant.
- 17 June – Øystein Stray Spetalen, businessman and investor.
- 24 June – Kristian Seip, mathematician.
- 26 June – Morten Skogstad, glam metal singer
- 27 June – Alf Bakken, politician.
- 30 June – Lars Lillo-Stenberg, singer, songwriter and guitarist.

=== July ===
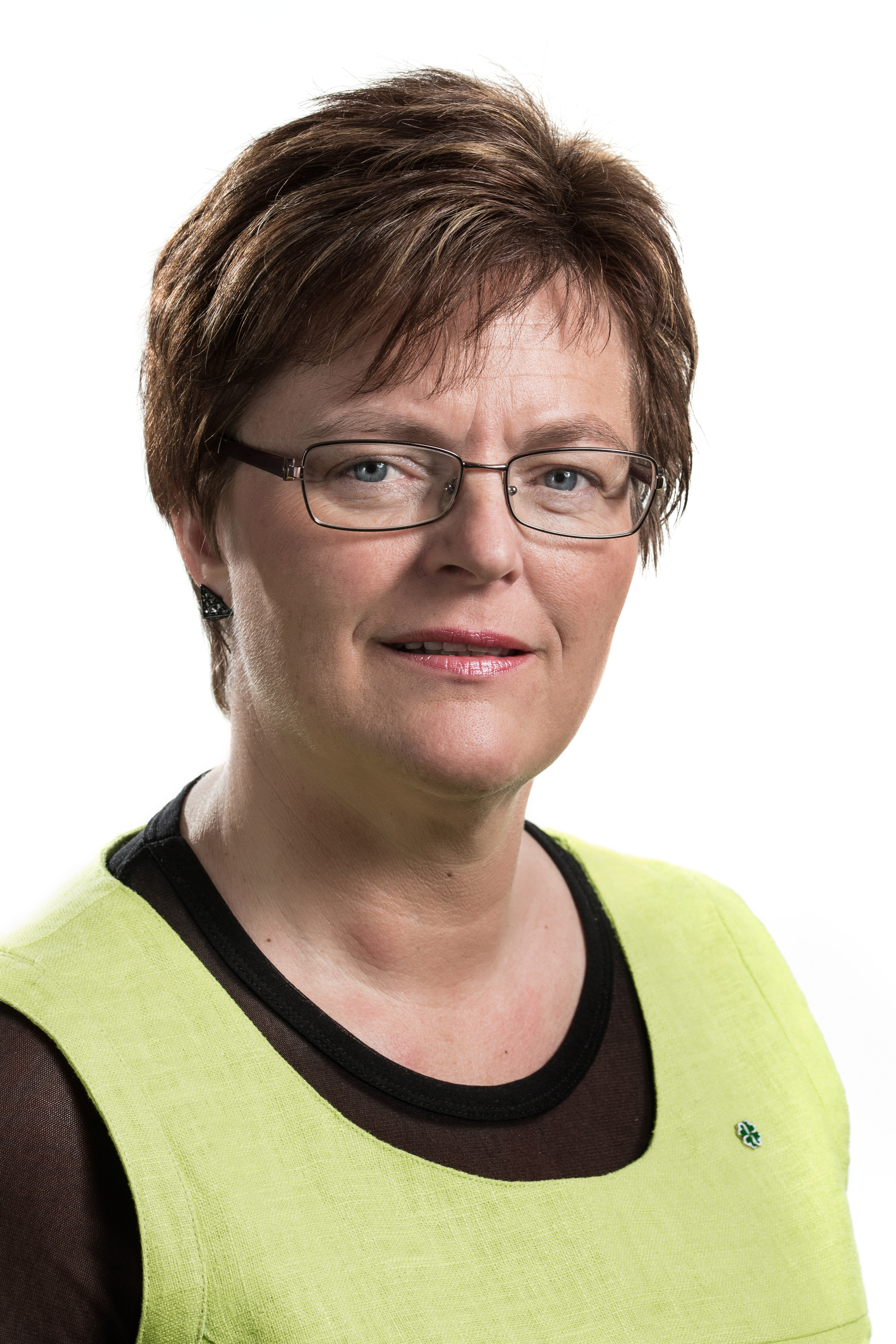
Heidi Greni

- 1 July – Aase Simonsen, politician.
- 2 July – Christl Kvam, trade unionist.
- 3 July – Heidi Greni, politician.
- 7 July – Ellen Sofie Olsvik, orienteering competitor.
- 10 July – Trond Helleland, politician.
- 16 July – Gøran Sørloth, footballer.
- 24 July
  - Frank Evensen, judoka.
  - Anne Brit Skjæveland, heptathlete.
- 25 July – Nils Ove Hellvik, footballer.

=== August ===
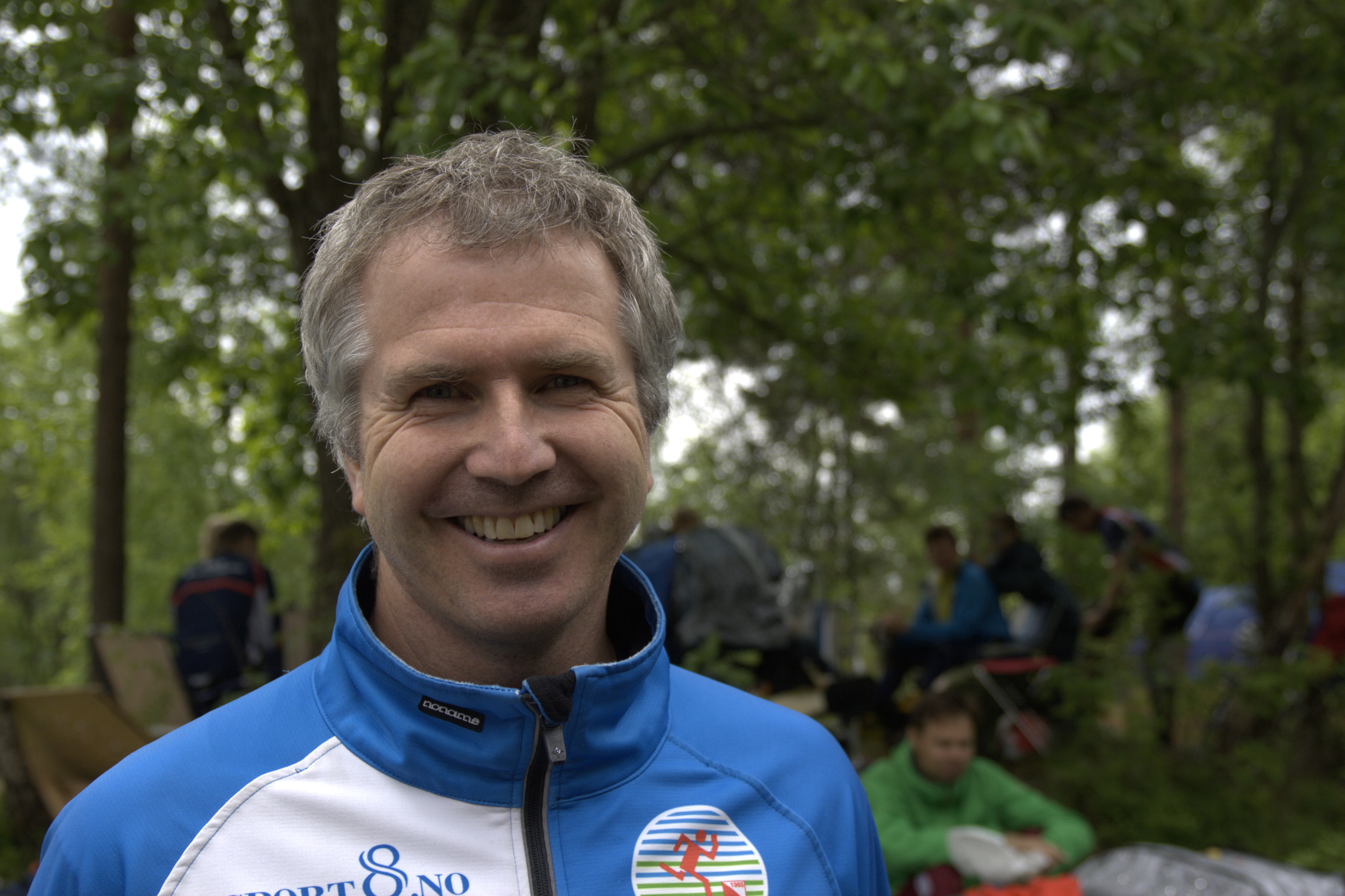
Vidar Benjaminsen

- 14 August – Per Elvestuen, illustrator.
- 18 August – Vidar Benjaminsen, ski orienteering competitor.
- 23 August – Tore Hattrem, diplomat and politician.
- 29 August – Idar Kreutzer, businessperson.

=== September ===
- 2 September – Knut Leo Abrahamsen, Nordic combined skier.
- 4 September – Margunn Ebbesen, politician.
- 24 September – Ørjan Løvdal, ice hockey player and coach.
- 29 September – Odd Harald Hovland, politician.
- 30 September – Christian Syse, diplomat and civil servant.

=== October ===
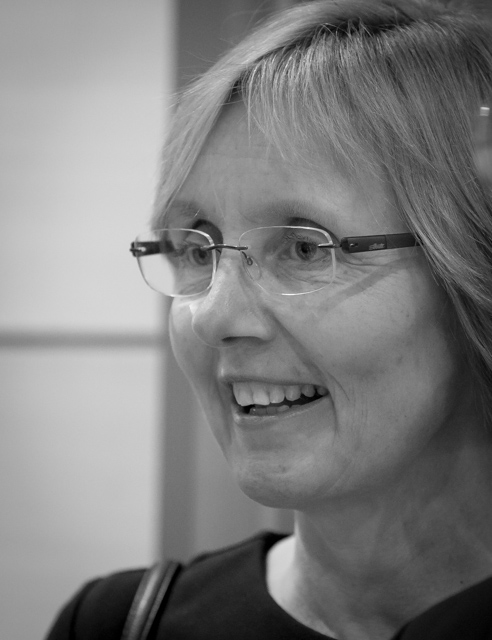
Eli Telhaug

- 5 October – Eli Telhaug, civil servant.
- 8 October – Mona Høvring, writer.
- 12 October – Jonny Halberg, author and dramatist
- 13 October – Hans Petter Blad, writer.
- 15 October – Morten Abel, singer and songwriter.
- 16 October
  - Elisabeth Aspaker, politician
  - Helge Lund, businessperson
- 28 October – Erik Thorstvedt, footballer.
- 30 October – Heidi Sundal, handball player.

=== November ===
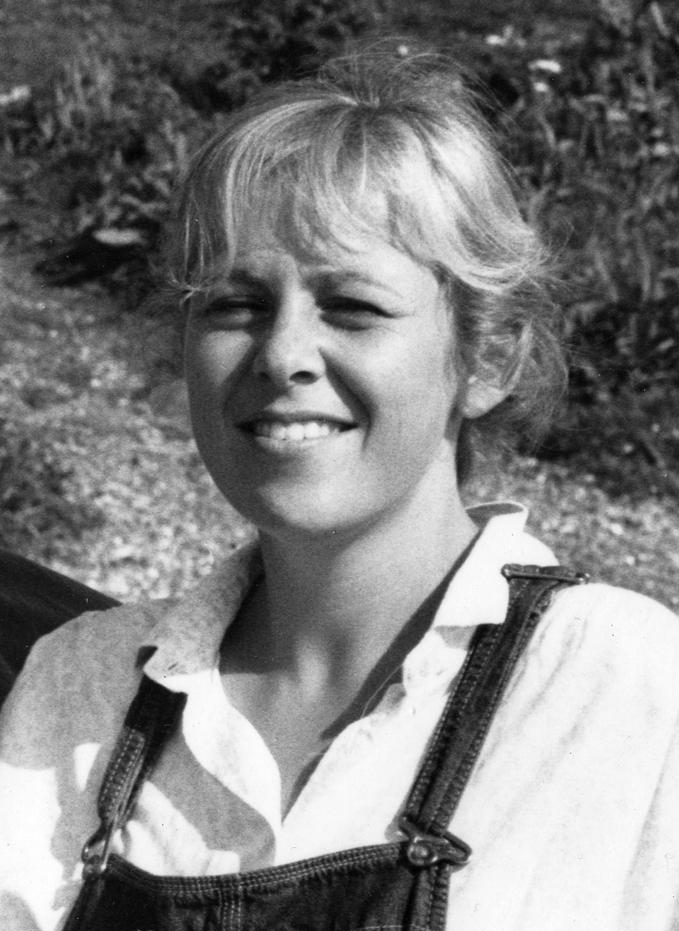
Turid Birkeland

- 1 November
  - Magne Furuholmen, keyboardist and artist
  - Bjarne Håkon Hanssen, politician.
  - Lars Helle, journalist and newspaper editor.
- 3 November – Yngve Slyngstad, former CEO of Norges Bank Investment Management (NBIM).
- 5 November – Turid Birkeland, politician and cultural executive (died 2015).
- 9 November – Mette Bergmann, discus thrower.
- 22 November – Ragnhild Bergheim, politician
- 26 November – Gisken Armand, actress.
- 28 November – Jon Rønningen, wrestler.
- 29 November – Petter Stordalen, businessperson.

=== December ===
- 8 December – Olaf Kamfjord, jazz musician.
- 11 December – Ulrich Møller, footballer.
- 18 December – Dorthe Skappel, television personality and former model

=== Full date missing ===
- Ola Braanaas, fish farmer.
- Liv Holmefjord, civil servant
- Ørnulf Seippel, sociologist

== Notable deaths ==
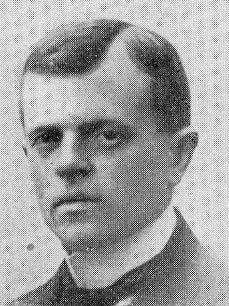
Johannes Gerckens Bassøe

- 24 February – Per Skou, international soccer player (b.1891)
- 11 April – Axel Revold, painter (born 1887).
- 22 April – Anders Johanneson Bøyum, politician (b.1890)
- 8 May – Alfred Madsen, editor, trade unionist and politician (b.1888)
- 5 June – Hans Eidnes, politician (b.1887)
- 11 June – Sveinung O. Flaaten, politician (b.1898)
- 30 July – Johannes Gerckens Bassøe, jurist and civil servant (b.1878)
- 1 August – Olaf Sørensen, politician (b.1892)
- 12 August – Vibeke Lunde, sailor (b.1921).
- 10 October – Trygve Gulbranssen, novelist (b.1894)
- 29 October – Einar Gundersen, footballer (b.1896)
- 23 November – Jacob Prytz, goldsmith and designer (born 1886).
- 7 December – Kirsten Flagstad, opera singer (b.1895)
- 17 December – Jens Schive, journalist and diplomat (b.1900)
- 21 December – Asbjørn Bodahl, gymnast (b.1896)
- 30 December – Olav Bruvik, politician (b.1912)
