= Tonje Steinsland =

Norwegian journalist (born 1969)

Tonje Steinsland (born 1969) is a Norwegian journalist. She has worked as a television journalist since 1991, notably as an investigative reporter and host of documentary series Brennpunkt, Rikets tilstand and Dokument 2. She has later been the host of the TV 2 talk shows Tonje Steinsland møter... and Vårt lille land.

Steinsland first worked as the host of the youth show U on NRK, and thereafter made investigative documentaries as a reporter and host for Brennpunkt on NRK, and Rikets tilstand and Dokument 2 on TV 2. Steinsland has received several awards for her journalism. Her 2000 documentary Norske jenter omskjæres for Rikets tilstand, about the secret approval by imams of female genital mutilation of Norwegian Muslim girls won her a SKUP diploma and Gullruten for best documentary. She has later been the host of the talk show Tonje Steinsland møter... where she has personal interviews with Norwegian celebrities, and of Vårt lille land on TV 2 since 2012, which won her the Gullruten for best documentary in 2013, the Riksmål Society TV-award in 2019, and a diploma from Fortellingens Kraft 2022.
