= Arne Rinnan =

Norwegian sailor (born 1940)

Arne Frode Rinnan
- Born: 10 November 1940 (age 85); Oslo, Norway
- Occupation: Ship captain
- Employer: Wallenius Wilhelmsen
- Known for: His role in the Tampa affair
- Awards: Nansen Refugee Award 2001; Royal Norwegian Order of Merit; Name of the Year

Arne Frode Rinnan (born 10 November 1940) is a retired Norwegian sailor. He was the former captain of the MV Tampa, which in 2001 was refused access to Australia to disembark 433 rescued refugees in what became known as the Tampa affair. Rinnan and his crew were awarded the Nansen Refugee Award in 2002.

== Early life ==
Rinnan was born on 10 November 1940 in Oslo, Norway) to parents, Louise Mari "Lillemor" Devold and Frode Rinnan, who moved from Ålesund in 1939.

== Career ==
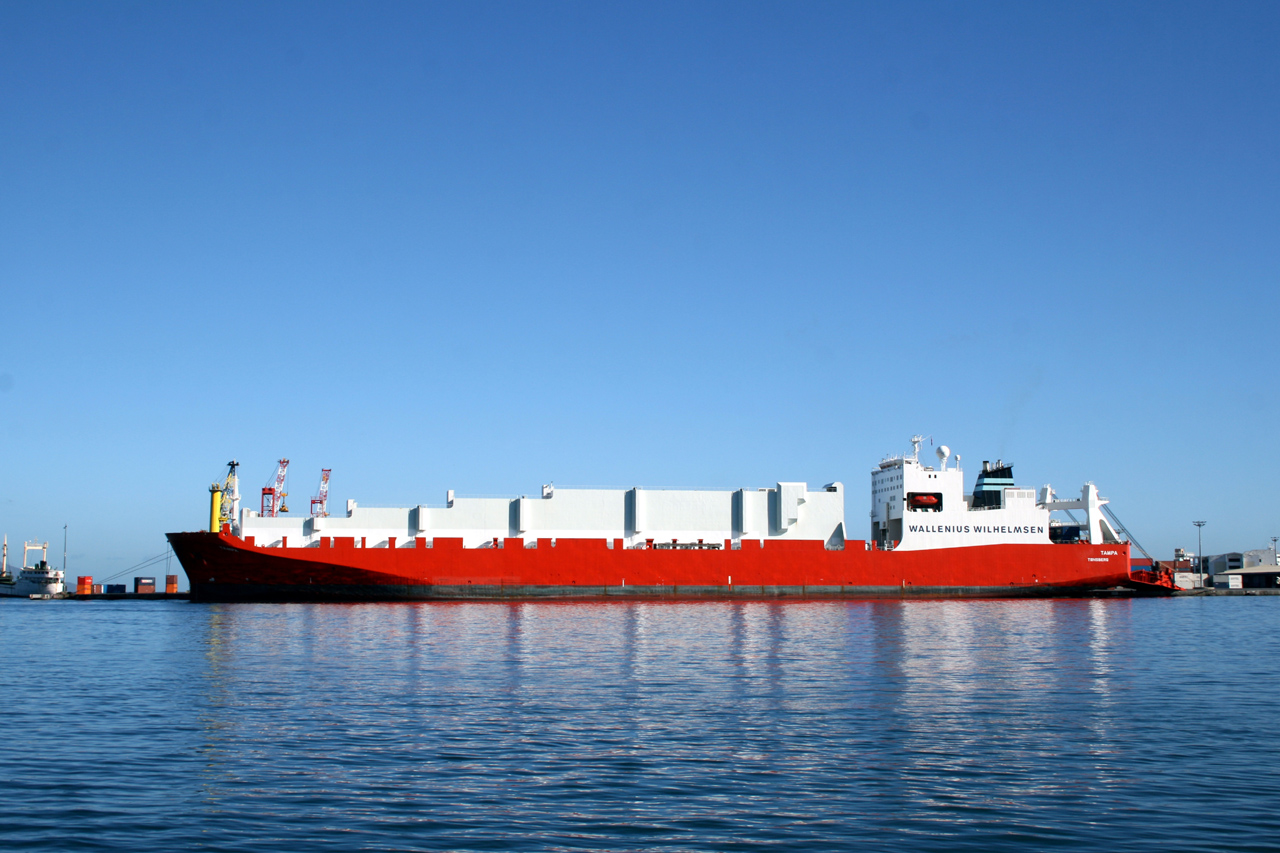
The MV Tampa in 2009

Rinnan worked as the captain of the MV Tampa owned by Norwegian shipping line Wallenius Wilhelmsen.

=== Tampa Affair ===
On 26 August 2001, the MV Tampa was on its way from Fremantle in Australia to Singapore, when the Australian Maritime Safety Authority requested the crew to go to the aid of The Palapa, a 25-meter vessel in distress that was transporting 433 refugees. The crew rescued the refugees, most of whom were Hazara Afghans, along with Pakistanis and Sri Lankans. Captain Rinnan directed his ship towards the nearest port, in Indonesia, but some refugees broke into the bridge and forced him to proceed to Christmas Island in Australian waters. The MV Tampa arrived at Christmas Island on August 27, but Australian authorities blocked the refugees from disembarking; the refugees subsequently went on hunger strike. Contrary to instructions from the Australian authorities, Rinnan moved the MV Tampa further into Australian territorial waters. Australian armed forces boarded the vessel and demanded a change of course towards international waters, but Rinnan refused, citing the health needs of the refugees. The Norwegian government publicly rebuked the Australian government for its actions.

ABC news report by Margot O'Neill on the Tampa affair and its political context, October 2001.

On August 30, the United Nations High Commissioner for Refugees, Mary Robinson urged the Australian government to allow the disembarkation of the refugees. Australian Prime Minister John Howard robustly rejected the request, but proposed a compromise that saw the refugees being transported to Nauru, via Papua New Guinea. The crisis ended on September 2, 2001.

=== Tampa Affair aftermath ===
In 2001, Rinnan was made a knight of the 1st class of Royal Norwegian Order of Merit and was named Captain of the Year by the British Nautical Institute and Lloyds' List shipping journal. Norwegian newspaper Dagbladet named Rinnan the 2001 Name of the Year. United Nations High Commissioner for Refugees awarded Rinnan and his crew the Nansen Refugee Prize for 2002.

In 2002, Rinnan his crew were awarded the Norwegian Medaljen for redningsdåd til sjøs [no]. (English Medal for Sea Rescue)

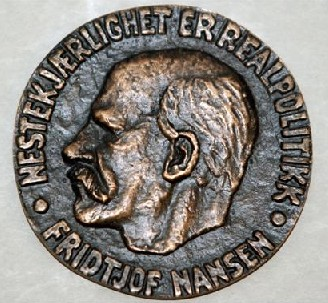
Nansen Award

Arne Rinnan retired from his position as captain in 2002.

== Personal life ==
Rinnan lives with his family in the city of Kongsberg.

== See also ==
- Ruddock v Vadarlis
- Asylum in Australia
- Immigration detention in Australia
