= Hege Storhaug =

Norwegian political activist and author (born 1962)

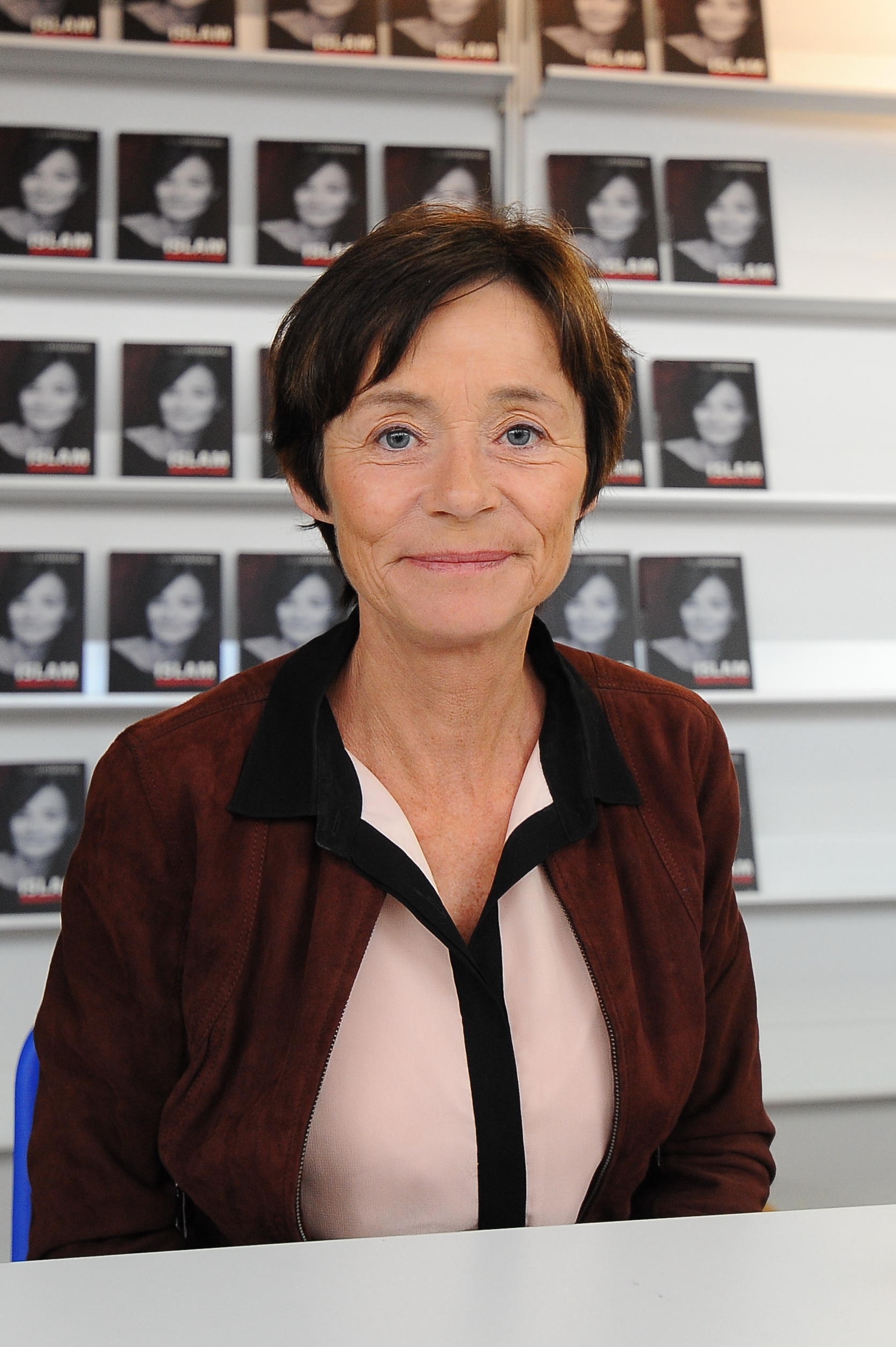
- Storhaug at the Warsaw Book Fair in 2017
- Born: 21 May 1962 (age 64); Arendal, Norway
- Occupations: Activist; writer; author
- Writing career
- Subjects: Criticism of Islam, immigration and multiculturalism
- Notable awards: Southern Norway's Literary Prize, 2007

Hege Storhaug (born 21 May 1962) is a Norwegian political activist, writer and author. She has been known for her criticism of Islamic cultural practices focusing on women's rights since the 1990s, and later also opposition to immigration. She formerly worked as a journalist, and has run the small organisation Human Rights Service with her partner since 2002. In 2015, she published the bestselling book Islam, den 11. landeplage (later translated to English as Islam: Europe Invaded. America Warned) which claimed that Islam is a "plague".

Formerly an active volleyball player, Storhaug is a certified athletic trainer with a degree from the Norwegian School of Sport Sciences, and has highlighted eating disorders among female athletes. She began playing on the Norway women's national volleyball team when she was sixteen years old.

== Sports and early life ==
Storhaug was born in Arendal, and grew up on the island of Hisøy in Hisøy Municipality. She was an active volleyball player in her youth, and won the Norwegian Championship as part of the team Hisøy IL when she was fourteen and sixteen years old. When she was sixteen years old, she made her debut on the junior national team, as well as the senior national team.

She started her education at the Norwegian School of Sport Sciences in 1984, and graduated as a certified athletic trainer in 1987. From 1986 to 1987 she studied health and sports biology, and wrote a paper based on her mapping of the extent of eating disorders among female athletes. It was the first such mapping in Norway, and it brought considerable attention, including being on the first page of newspaper Dagbladet. She spoke in the media about her own eating disorder as a young athlete, which led to major public debate about the problem in Norway. In the wake of this, she co-founded the Interest Group for Women with Eating Disorders, and functioned as the press and information director of the organisation from 1987 to 1990.

In 1990 Storhaug took part in a mock marriage with her then-girlfriend as a protest outside the Norwegian parliament building. She is today married.

== Journalism ==
Storhaug worked as a journalist for the left-wing newspaper Klassekampen from 1989 to 1990. She completed a degree in journalism at the Norwegian School of Journalism in 1992, after which she worked as a freelance journalist. One of her earliest journalistic efforts, for Dagbladet in 1992, was the first report in Norway about the forced marriages of young Muslim women. Before working with the story she adhered to left-wing "anti-racist" beliefs, and was shocked by her findings. The report in turn led to the passing of a law banning forced marriages in Norway. For further research she lived in Pakistan for two years in the mid-1990s, and wrote a book about her experience titled Mashallah. En reise blant kvinner i Pakistan. (As of 2015 she has visited Pakistan seventeen times, and has several of her closest friends there.)

After the publication of her book Hellig tvang in 1998, Storhaug had a leading role in the production of two documentaries for Rikets tilstand and TV 2 that aired in October 1999 about forced marriages and honor killings in Norway, which had a major impact on Norwegian society. She thereafter conceived and researched the documentary Norske jenter omskjæres which revealed that girls in Norway were being subjected to female genital mutilation and that imams in the country secretly supported this practice. The program, which aired on TV 2 in October 2000 caused a considerable outcry, not least because imams who condemned this practice in interviews were caught on hidden cameras openly expressing their approval and encouragement of the procedure. The documentary won a SKUP diploma in 2000 and the Gullruten award for best documentary in 2001.

In 2002, Storhaug released a report that described nine likely honor killings that had taken place in Norway by 2001.

== Human Rights Service ==
In 2002, Storhaug also joined and began as information director of the foundation Human Rights Service (HRS), which had been founded by Rita Karlsen the year before. She was later, in 2004 accused of having exerted undue pressure on the girls she had worked with for her documentaries. Among those who have praised Storhaug and HRS's work is Ayaan Hirsi Ali, who in the first article she published as a fellow of the American Enterprise Institute wrote that while most non-governmental organizations in Europe "are embarrassingly silent" on the struggle for human rights for Muslim women and girls, "there is one in Norway that pays attention, Human Rights Service, run by a brave, determined woman, Hege Storhaug."

Storhaug's 2006 book Men størst av alt er friheten (later translated to English as But the Greatest of These Is Freedom), was praised by some critics and won the Southern Norway's Literary Prize. However, only a total of 929 votes were cast, and there were five books nominated for the prize. A high-profile participant in media debates about forced marriage, honor killing, genital mutilation, Islam, and questions relating to the cultural impact and economic sustainability of large-scale immigration, her research and outspokenness led her to become increasingly more controversial.

In 2007 Storhaug was assaulted outside her own home and beaten bloody and unconscious with blows to the head by an unknown assailant. She did not go public with the story until 2010, initially wanting to keep it private and fearing it could scare likeminded activists, until changing her mind after an attack against Danish cartoonist Kurt Westergaard.

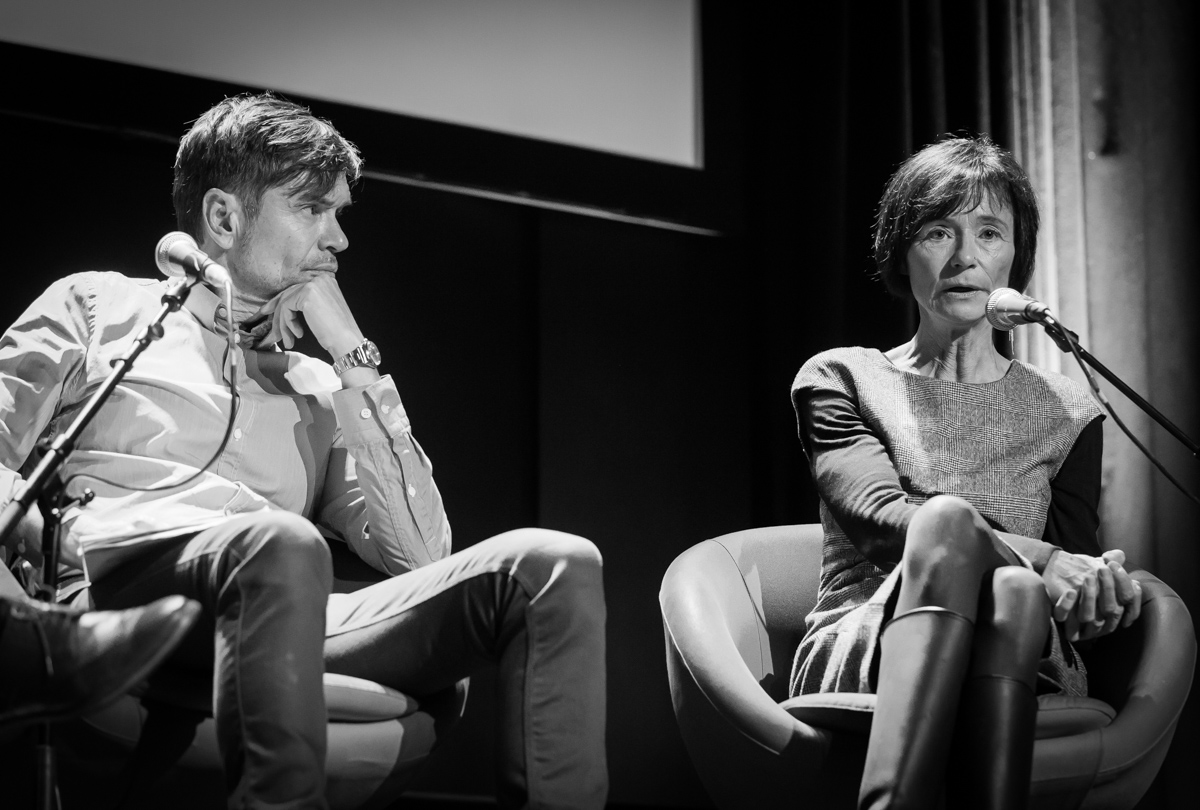
Storhaug in a 2015 debate forum hosted following the publication of her book, with Kjetil Rolness

Her book Islam, den 11. landeplage (later translated to English as Islam: Europe Invaded. America Warned) became one of Norway's biggest bestsellers during the autumn of 2015, selling 20,000 copies in its first month with several new editions issued, despite being self-published and gaining little to none initial mainstream media coverage. The same year she led online voting for the "Name of the Year" award of newspaper Verdens Gang by a wide margin, but fell short of winning the award following a final selective opinion poll. Some including Gunnar Stavrum and Kjetil Rolness criticised the selection process of the newspaper, particularly that the final results were not publicly disclosed and a less favourable presentation of Storhaug in the poll. By February 2016 the book had sold nearly 50,000 copies in Norway.

Social anthropologist Sindre Bangstad has described Storhaug as having a "long record of heavily biased and tendentious statements about Muslims in Norway". Although Storhaug has officially distanced herself from the Eurabia theory since 2011, her 2015 book has according to Bangstad been seen to use "any number of far-right and counter-jihadist sources", including Eurabia author Bat Ye'or, while her use of an underlying notion of a conspiracy with "liberal elites" is "of course a variant of the 'Eurabia' thesis".

== Works ==
=== Bibliography ===
- Når følelser blir mat. Kvinner og spiseforstyrrelser [When feelings become food. Women and eating disorders]. Co-authored with Christensen, Karin. Aschehoug. 1990. ISBN 978-8203162367.
- Mashallah. En reise blant kvinner i Pakistan [Mashallah. A journey among women in Pakistan]. Aschehoug. 1996. ISBN 978-8203261152.
- Hellig tvang. Unge norske muslimer om kjærlighet og ekteskap [Holy force. Young Norwegian Muslims about love and marriage]. Aschehoug. 1998. ISBN 978-8203223211.
- Feminin integrering. Utfordringer i et fleretnisk samfunn. Kolofon. 2003. ISBN 978-8230000397.
  - Human Visas: A Report from the Front Lines of Europe's Integration Crisis. English translation by Bawer, Bruce. Kolofon. 2003. ISBN 978-8230000496.
- Men størst av alt er friheten. Om innvandringens konsekvenser. Kagge. 2006. ISBN 978-8248906551.
  - But the Greatest of These is Freedom: The Consequences of Immigration in Europe. Revised and updated English translation. Create Space. 2011. ISBN 978-1456452872.
- Tilslørt. Avslørt. Et oppgjør med norsk naivisme [Covered. Exposed. A settlement with Norwegian naivety]. Kagge. 2007. ISBN 978-8248907404.
- Jeg er Mia [I am Mia]. Co-authored with Gundersen, Mia. Aschehoug. 2008. ISBN 978-8203291449.
- Rundlurt. Om innvandring og islam i Norge [Completely fooled. About immigration and Islam in Norway]. Kagge. 2009. ISBN 978-8248908920.
- Islam, den 11. landeplage. Kolofon. 2015. ISBN 978-8230013458.
  - Islam: Europe Invaded. America Warned. English translation. Kassandra. 2018. ISBN 978-8230339596.

=== Documentaries ===
Storhaug worked as the chief researcher for the following television documentaries:

- Tvangsekteskap og æresdrap i det muslimske miljøet i Norge [Forced marriage and honour killings in the Muslim community in Norway] (two parts). TV 2. Rikets tilstand. 1999.
- Norske jenter omskjæres [Norwegian girls are being circumcised] (two parts). TV 2. Rikets tilstand. 2000.

== Awards ==
- Chief researcher for the documentary Rikets tilstand: Norske jenter omskjæres, which won a SKUP diploma (2000) and Gullruten (2001)
- Southern Norway's Literary Prize (2007), for her book Men størst av alt er friheten (But the Greatest of These is Freedom)
