= Ørjasæter =

Ørjasæter is a surname. Notable people with the surname include:

- Elin Ørjasæter (born 1962), Norwegian children's writer, columnist, non-fiction writer and lecturer
- Sondre Ørjasæter (born 2003), Norwegian footballer
- Tordis Ørjasæter (1927–2026), Norwegian literary critic, biographer, professor of educational science, and novelist
- Tore Ørjasæter (1886–1968), Norwegian educator, literature critic and poet
