= Ørnulf =

Ørnulf is a Norwegian given name that may refer to

- Ørnulf Andresen (born 1944), Norwegian cyclist
- Ørnulf Bast (1907–1974), Norwegian sculptor and painter
- Ørnulf Dahl (1900–1971), Norwegian military officer
- Ørnulf Egge (1910–1978), Norwegian politician
- Ørnulf Gulbransen (1916–2004), Norwegian flute player
- Ørnulf Opdahl (born 1944), Norwegian painter and educator
- Ørnulf Ranheimsæter (1919–2007), Norwegian illustrator, graphical artist and essayist
- Ørnulf Rød (1891–1969), Norwegian barrister
- Ørnulf Seippel (born 1962), Norwegian sociologist
- Ørnulf Tofte (born 1922), Norwegian police officer

== See also ==
- IF Ørnulf, Norwegian sports club
