= Norske jenter omskjæres =

- Rikets tilstand episodes
- Episode nos.: Season 2 Episodes 2 & 3
- Story by: Hege Storhaug
- Presented by: Tonje Steinsland
- Original air dates: 27 September 2000; 4 October 2000
- Running time: 2 x 25 minutes

Norske jenter omskjæres (English: Norwegian Girls Are Being Circumcised) is a Norwegian television documentary that was aired in two parts as part of the Rikets tilstand investigative series on TV 2 on 27 September and 4 October 2000, which exposed the secret support by Norwegian imams of female genital mutilation (FGM).

== Overview and reactions ==
Tonje Steinsland was the reporter, and Hege Storhaug was the researcher for Norske jenter omskjæres. Their documentary filmed several Norwegian imams, who while stating to oppose FGM in interviews with Steinsland, were later seen in hidden camera footage with the 20-year old Somali Muslim woman Kadra Yusuf who worked for the documentary, asking for advice, to encourage her and her six and three year old sisters, to go through with the procedure following pressure from their family.

The Muslim leaders exposed in the documentary were Kebba Secka, leader of the Islamic Council Norway and an Oslo high school teacher with child protective service education, imam Fakebba Jagana from Gambia, Ebrahim Saidy from Gambia (considered to be a "liberal" imam), and imam Sheikh Muumin. FGM had been banned in Norway in 1995, with a penalty of up to eight years in prison. The documentary demonstrated Norwegian Muslims in turn sending their daughters abroad to be mutilated. The documentary caused major reactions in Norwegian and African society in Norway. Six Norwegian government departments established task force groups to investigate the issue, with the government deciding to spend between 5 and 10 million kr to combat FGM in 2001.

The Norwegian state suspended financial support to three Muslim religious groups as a result of the documentary. One of these, the mosque Tawfiiq Islamic Center, sued TV 2 in 2003 for the documentary for having damaged much of its reputation. The mosque lost the case in 2004. Norske jenter omskjæres won a SKUP diploma for 2000 and the Gullruten award for best documentary in 2001.
