= Synnøve Korssjøen =

Norwegian goldsmith (born 1949)

- Born: 20 June 1949 (age 76); Røros Municipality, Norway
- Occupation: Goldsmith

Synnøve Korssjøen (born 20 June 1949) is a Norwegian goldsmith.

She was born in Røros Municipality to Petter Korssjøen and Solveig Sommer, and resides in Trondheim. She studied at the Norwegian National Academy of Craft and Art Industry from 1967 to 1970, and again in 1990/91. Her jewellery is typically inspired from nature, such as insects, plants and animals, and often contains vitreous enamel. She is represented at the Norwegian Museum of Decorative Arts and Design, the Danish Museum of Art & Design, and in museums in Bergen and Trondheim (Nordenfjeldske Kunstindustrimuseum).

She has designed the SKUP Award (shaped as a cube) awarded for excellent investigative journalism along with the prize money.
