= Gerhard Helskog =

Norwegian journalist and TV host

Gerhard Helskog (born 6 May 1963) is a Norwegian journalist. He has worked for TV 2 since 1992, where he has been the host of shows such as Dokument 2, Rikets tilstand, Bak din rygg and Vårt lille land. He has received several awards for his journalism.

He is married to fellow journalist Hanne Skartveit. He announced he was stepping down as journalist in 2021 after having been diagnosed with Parkinson's disease.
