= Tampa affair =

2001 Australian political crisis and diplomatic dispute with Norway

ABC news report by Margot O'Neill on the Tampa affair and its political context, October 2001

In late August 2001, the Howard government of Australia refused permission for the Norwegian freighter MV Tampa, carrying 433 rescued refugees (predominantly Hazaras of Afghanistan) from a distressed fishing vessel in international waters and 5 crew, to enter Australian waters. This triggered an Australian political controversy in the lead-up to the 2001 federal election, and a diplomatic dispute between Australia and Norway.

When Tampa entered Australian waters, the Prime Minister ordered the ship be boarded by Australian special forces. This brought censure from the government of Norway, which said the Australian government failed to meet its obligations to distressed mariners under international law at the United Nations. Within a few days, the government introduced the Border Protection Bill into the House of Representatives, saying it would confirm Australian sovereignty to "determine who will enter and reside in Australia". The government introduced the "Pacific Solution", whereby the asylum seekers were taken to Nauru where their refugee status was considered, rather than in Australia.

== Rescue at sea ==
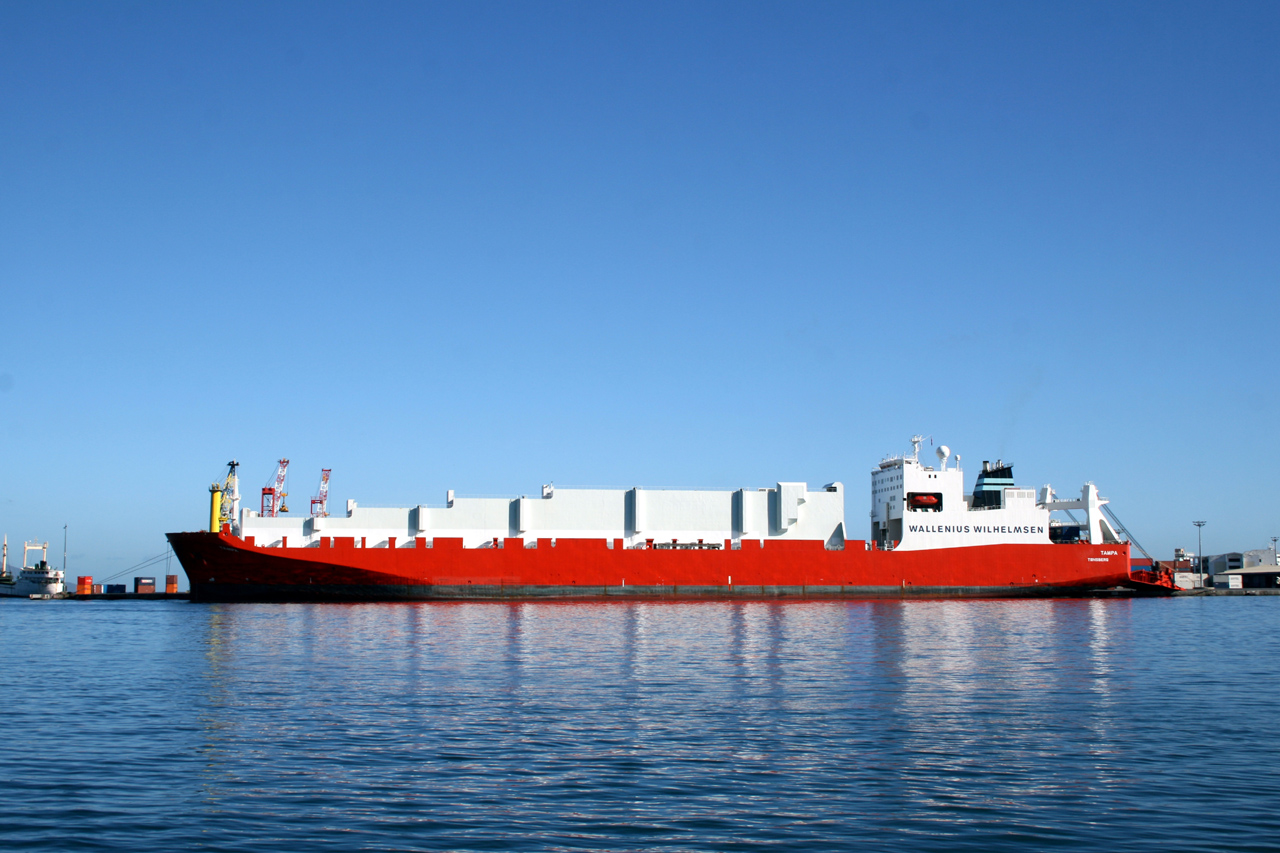
MV Tampa

In the years leading up to 2001, increasing numbers of people attempted to travel to Australia by boat to seek asylum as refugees. Many of these arrived off Christmas Island, an Australian territory in the Indian Ocean, 2,000 km off the north-west coast of Australia and 500 km south of Jakarta, Indonesia. Hundreds of people arrived on tightly packed, unseaworthy vessels, and many paid large amounts of money to people smugglers for their passage to Australia.

At dawn on 24 August 2001, a 20-metre wooden fishing boat, the Palapa 1, with 438 (369 men, 26 women and 43 children) mainly Hazara, became stranded in international waters about 140 km north of Christmas Island.

On 26 August, Rescue Coordination Centre (RCC) Australia, which had been aware of the vessel's distress, possibly through Coastwatch surveillance, requested all ships in the area to respond. Of the ships that acknowledged the request, Tampa was closest to the site and began to proceed towards the distressed Palapa 1.

According to international law, survivors of a shipwreck are to be taken to the closest suitable port on the vessel's intended course for medical treatment. Such a port was 12 hours away in Merak, Indonesia. Christmas Island was six or seven hours closer, but it did not have the ability to receive large shipping freighters and neither was it on the vessel's route.

The Australian rescue authorities had been the first to become aware of the vessel's distress, and for some time attempted to contact the relevant Indonesian authorities to attend to the rescue. RCC sent a fax to the Indonesian Search and Rescue Agency (Basarnas) on the night of 25 August but received no response. On Sunday, 26 August, Australian EST, the Australian embassy sent the naval attaché David Ramsay to visit Basarnas. By this time, Australian surveillance had observed that the ship's passengers had fashioned signs that read "SOS" and "HELP" on the ship's deck and, in response, further attempts were made to contact Basarnas, first by fax and then through the defence attaché in Jakarta. At this time, DIMA called RCC "asking if vessels that respond to Australian search and rescue broadcast can tow the stranded vessel to Indonesia".

A call to shipping was broadcast at 12:48 Canberra time:

Subject: Distress Relay. A 35-metre Indonesian type vessel with 80 plus persons on board adrift in the vicinity of 09.32.5 south 104.44 east… vessel has SOS and HELP written on the roof. Vessels within 10 hours report best ETA and intentions to this station.

Captain Arne Rinnan of MV Tampa responded to the mayday call: "We are on a voyage from Fremantle to Singapore via Sunda Strait… We have changed course and are headed for position of distress… Please advise further course of action. A Rinnan, Master." After an hour of setting course for the vessel, Rinnan received a direction from RCC apparently attempting to disown the rescue operation: "Please note that Indonesian search and rescue authorities have accepted co-ordination of this incident."

Tampa reached the vessel, guided by Australian Coastwatch de Havilland Dash-8 aircraft, at about 2 pm. The first child was lifted to safety at 2:30pm and the rescue operation continued all afternoon.

Rinnan recounted in an interview with Norway Today:

They sent a plane to direct us to the sinking boat. When we arrived it was obvious to us that it was coming apart. Several of the refugees were obviously in a bad state and collapsed when they came on deck to us. 10 to 12 of them were unconscious, several had dysentery and a pregnant woman suffered abdominal pains.

During the rescue, Rinnan received a call from Jakarta advising him to disembark the passengers at the ferry port of Merak, Indonesia.

About half an hour after Tampa had set sail toward Indonesia, a delegation of five asylum seekers visited the bridge to demand passage to Australian territory, specifically Christmas Island, or any western country. The group was quite aggressive and agitated and Rinnan agreed to alter course for Christmas Island.

When interviewed by UK newspaper The Observer, Rinnan explained: "A delegation of five men came up to the bridge. They behaved aggressively and told us to go to Australia. They said they had nothing to lose." Although Rinnan reported that he did not feel threatened and there was no risk of him losing his ship, he was conscious of the fact that there was now insufficient safety equipment or rations for all persons on board.

== Denial of permission to enter Australia ==
The ship requested the Australian government's permission to unload the asylum seekers at Christmas Island, arguing that the ship could not sail to Indonesia, because it was unseaworthy — the ship was not designed for 438 people, only its 27 crew; and there were no lifeboats or other safety equipment available for the asylum seekers in the case of an emergency. The Australian government refused permission for the ship to enter Australia's territorial waters, and threatened to prosecute Captain Arne Rinnan as a people smuggler if it did so.

The Australian government denied any obligation under international law as Christmas Island lies within a zone designated as Indonesia's responsibility for rescue according to an agreement made in 1990 between Australia and Indonesia. Indonesia had also accepted co-ordination of the rescue, and the closest suitable port was Merak in Indonesia. The Minister for Foreign Affairs, Alexander Downer explained to parliament that "It is important that people understand that Australia has no obligation under International law to accept the rescued persons in to Australian territory." Australian ambassador David Stuart said in the United Nations that "the rescue by the MV Tampa occurred outside the search and rescue region designated as being the responsibility of Australia." Although Tampa had responded to a broadcast by an Australian rescue agency, on 30 August, Downer stated in parliament that the survivors were picked up "at the direction of the Indonesian search and rescue authorities."

Faced with Australia's threats of prosecution, Captain Rinnan agreed to turn slowly back towards Indonesia in the hope that the asylum seekers would not notice. About half an hour into the turn, however, they did notice and again became agitated. Captain Rinnan, concerned that if the ship continued to sail to Indonesia the asylum seekers could jump overboard or riot and harm the crew, decided to head back towards Christmas Island.

As the ship approached the boundary of Australia's territorial waters (12 nautical miles (22 km) from the island), Captain Rinnan pleaded for permission for the ship to dock at Christmas Island. He reported that several of the asylum seekers were unconscious, and others were suffering from dysentery, statements subsequently supported by the Special Air Service (SAS) physician, but later disputed by Australian authorities. The Australian government provided medical assistance and food, but still refused permission for the ship to enter Australian territorial waters. The Australian government sent military personnel to Christmas Island, ostensibly to be ready to provide this assistance to the ship.

On 29 August, Captain Rinnan, having lost patience with the Australian authorities, increasingly concerned for the safety of the asylum seekers and the ship's crew, and also possibly acting under direction of the Norwegian Government, declared a state of emergency and proceeded to enter Australian territorial waters without permission. The legality of this action has been the subject of debate, with the Australian government maintaining that it was illegal.

== Deployment of the SAS ==
The Australian government responded by dispatching Australian troops from the SAS led by squadron commander Major Vance Khan, under Colonel Gus Gilmore, to board the ship and prevent it from approaching any closer to Christmas Island.

The SAS doctor later reported that the rescuees were generally dehydrated, malnourished and unhappy. Many were suffering from dehydration, exhaustion and minor ailments including sixty one cases of scabies, forty six cases of head lice and twenty six cases of gastroenteritis, among other conditions. They also attended to four pregnant women.

There were some disputes between the SAS and the ship's medical officer Christian Maltau, a deck officer with limited medical experience, regarding the deployment of medical supplies from Tampa, and the use of the limited supplies of water. In one incident, the ship's officer turned off the ship's water supply while rescuees were being washed after an outbreak of diarrhoea.

Captain Rinnan anchored approximately four nautical miles off Christmas Island. Shortly afterwards the Prime Minister of Australia, John Howard, reported the boarding of the ship to the Australian Parliament.

== Escalation ==
The Australian troops instructed Captain Rinnan to move the ship back into international waters; he refused, claiming the ship was unsafe to sail until the asylum seekers had been offloaded. The ship-owners said they agreed with his decision, and the Norwegian government warned the Australian government not to seek to force the ship to return to international waters against the captain's will.

The Australian government tried to persuade Indonesia to accept the asylum seekers; Indonesia refused. Norway also refused to accept the asylum seekers and reported Australia to the United Nations, the United Nations High Commissioner for Refugees, and the International Maritime Organization for alleged failure to obey its duties under international law, though it did not ask for the assistance of these organisations.

Captain Rinnan received the highest civil honour in Norway as a result of his handling of this difficult incident. Rinnan has been a sailor since 1958, and a captain for 23 years. He said of the incident:

I have seen most of what there is to see in this profession, but what I experienced on this trip is the worst. When we asked for food and medicine for the refugees, the Australians sent commando troops on board. This created a very high tension among the refugees. After an hour of checking the refugees, the troops agreed to give medical assistance to some of them… The soldiers obviously didn't like their mission.

== Border Protection Bill 2001 ==
Late on the night of 29 August, the Prime Minister introduced an emergency bill entitled the "Border Protection Bill 2001". This Bill would have provided the government with the power to remove any ship in the territorial waters of Australia (s 4), to use reasonable force to do so (s 5), to provide that any person who was on the ship may be forcibly returned to the ship (s 6), that no civil or criminal proceedings may be taken against the Australian government or any of its officers for removing the ship or returning people to it (s 7), that no court proceedings are available to prevent the ship from being removed and from people being returned to it (s 8), and that no asylum applications may be made by people on board the ship (s 9). The bill was intended to enter into force at 9:00 Australian Eastern Standard Time, 29 August 2001 (s 2); thus making the bill retroactive. It also attempted to ensure actions taken prior to legislation passage to remove ship and return people to it would have been treated as legal.

The Opposition Labor Party announced they would not support the bill; nor would the Greens, Democrats or independent Senator Brian Harradine. The bill quickly passed the lower House of Representatives, but was rejected by the Senate later that same sitting day. The Government attacked the Opposition for refusing to pass the legislation, but indicated it would not reintroduce it at that stage.

The government subsequently acted to excise Christmas Island and a large number of other coastal islands from Australia's migration zone, effectively meaning that any asylum seekers who did not reach the Australian mainland would not be able to apply for refugee status. The Labor party supported the excision of some islands that it viewed as acting as a "magnet for people smugglers", but not others, such as Melville Island, Northern Territory which it viewed as being too close to the mainland to justify excision. The other parties opposed excision of any islands.

== Political effects ==
Internationally, Australia was criticised by several countries, particularly Norway, which accused it of evading its human rights responsibilities.

Domestically, the government's line attracted strong support, especially in the aftermath of the 11 September attacks. The Australian government's popularity rating rose throughout the crisis. In the federal election following the arrival of Tampa, the Liberal Party campaigned on the issue, with John Howard's statement "we decide who comes into this country and the circumstances in which they come."

The Australian electorate largely supported the Government. Some television news polls in Australia showed as much as 90 percent support for the Australian government's actions. Many viewed the asylum seekers as "queue-jumpers" falsely claiming to be refugees, and criminals who "hijacked" Tampa to gain illegal entry into the country. There were concerns of a security risk involving a "floodgates" where people smugglers would deliberately target Australia as a perceived "soft target". Some public commentators, including then-Minister for Defence Peter Reith, suggested that groups of asylum seekers arriving by boat could harbour terrorists.

In 2003, economist Ross Gittins, a columnist at Fairfax Media, said Prime Minister John Howard had been "a tricky chap" on immigration, by appearing "tough" on illegal immigration to win support from the working class, while simultaneously winning support from employers with high legal immigration.

The issue also divided the Labor Party internally, with the Left faction of the party arguing strongly in favour of a "softer" approach, including the abolition of mandatory detention. The party leadership's compromise stance was pilloried by the Liberals as being wishy-washy and uncertain.

In July 2007, an unauthorised biography of John Howard claimed that he had received advice from the Attorney-General's Department that refusing the asylum seekers entry into Australia would breach international law, but that he did so to gain public support in the then upcoming election.

In 2019, former opposition leader Phil Goff stated that New Zealand's decision to take 131 of the Tampa refugees was one of the best decisions made by the Fifth Labour Government.

== Fate of the refugees ==
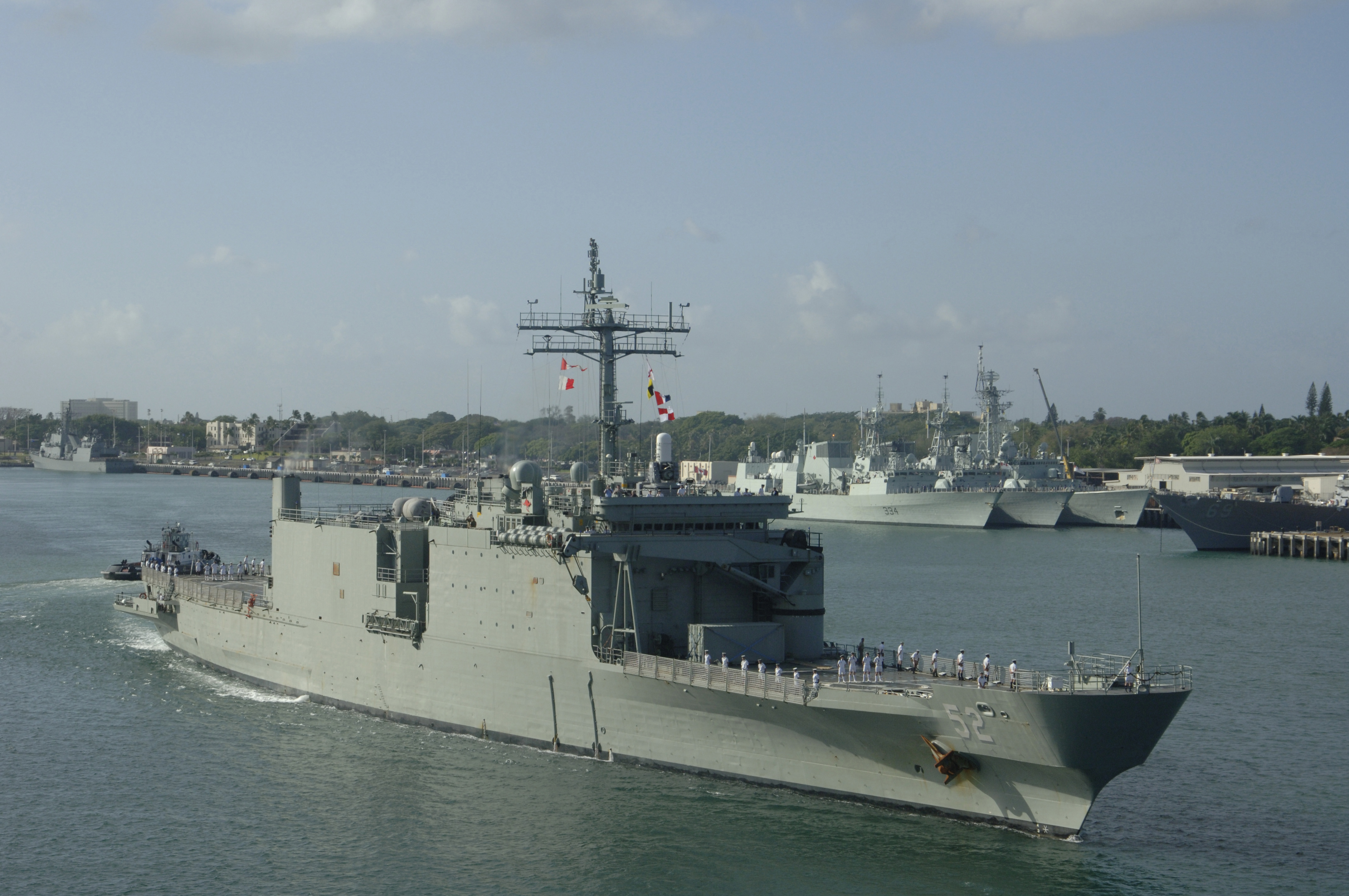
HMAS Manoora

The refugees from Tampa were loaded onto a Royal Australian Navy vessel, HMAS Manoora, which transported them to the small island country of Nauru, where most were held in two detention camps, State House and Topside. They were eventually joined by hundreds of other asylum seekers, under Australia's "Pacific Solution". Approximately 150 people were diverted to New Zealand, where they were subsequently granted asylum and progress to citizenship. In 2004, following the war in Afghanistan and invasion of Iraq, the New Zealand government began to reunite their families.

When those refugees not claimed by New Zealand arrived on Nauru, many of them refused to leave the boat after several additional weeks on board waiting for temporary shelters to be constructed, recognising they were to be held in detention camps pending the adjudication of their cases. Those eventually found to be refugees were granted three-year temporary protection visas, under which they could be returned to their places of origin in Afghanistan and Iraq at a time of the government's choosing.

On 23 May 2004, it was reported that most Afghan asylum seekers on Nauru recently granted refugee status were likely to be resettled in Australia. The Federal Government decided to grant refugee status to 92 Afghans detained on the Pacific island nation, while 11 applications were refused.

Holders of a Temporary Protection Visa were not allowed multiple entrances into Australia and did not have access to the same services as normally recognised refugees (for example, free English language lessons and help with job search). Another small group was later accepted by New Zealand.

== Awards ==
The crew of Tampa received the Nansen Refugee Award for 2002 from the United Nations High Commissioner for Refugees (UNHCR) for their involvement in the events. Captain Arne Rinnan was also named captain of the year by the shipping newspaper Lloyd's List and the Nautical Institute in London.

== See also ==
- List of Australian political controversies
- Children Overboard affair
- Mandatory detention in Australia
- Ruddock v Vadarlis
