= Dokument 2 =

- Genre: Documentary; Investigative journalism
- Country of origin: Norway
- Original language: Norwegian

Original release
- Network: TV 2
- Release: September 14, 1992 – present

Related
- Rikets tilstand

Dokument 2 is a Norwegian investigative documentary series that has aired on TV 2 since its inception in 1992. The series was originally hosted by Gerhard Helskog, later by Tonje Steinsland. The documentaries have won several Gullruten awards. Due to major cuts in TV 2, the station's own editorial production of documentaries in the series was dropped in 2009.
