= Ruddock v Vadarlis =

Judgement of the Federal Court of Australia

- Court: Full Court of the Federal Court of Australia
- Full case name: Ruddock & Ors v Vadarlis & Ors
- Decided: 18 September 2001
- Citations: Ruddock v Vadarlis [2001] FCA 1329, (2001) 110 FCR 491

Case history
- Prior actions: Victorian Council for Civil Liberties Inc v Minister for Immigration and Multicultural Affairs [2001] FCA 1297, the case at first instance before a single judge of the Federal Court
- Subsequent actions: Vadarlis v Minister for Immigration and Multicultural Affairs [2001] HCATrans 625, application to the High Court for special leave to appeal refused

Court membership
- Judges sitting: Black CJ, Beaumont & French JJ

Case opinions
- (2:1) there is a prerogative power to expel or exclude non-citizens from Australia, incorporated within the executive power of the Commonwealth under section 61 of the Australian Constitution, and the power has not been abrogated by the Migration Act 1958 (per French & Beaumont JJ) (2:1) the Government did not unlawfully detain the rescuees on the Tampa (per French & Beaumont JJ)

Ruddock v Vadarlis (also known as the Tampa case) was an Australian court case decided in the Federal Court of Australia on 18 September 2001. It concerned the actions of the Government of Australia in preventing asylum seekers aboard the Norwegian cargo vessel MV Tampa from entering Australia in late August 2001 (see Tampa affair). The Victorian Council for Civil Liberties (now Liberty Victoria), and solicitor Eric Vadarlis, were seeking a writ of habeas corpus (an order for the asylum seekers to be released). The case is significant because it is one of the few cases to consider the nature and scope of the prerogative power of the executive branch of Government in Australia.

== Background to the case ==
=== Executive power ===
One of the key issues in the case, both at trial and on appeal, was the nature of the executive power of government. There are several sources of executive power, but the source in consideration in this case was the prerogative power of government.

The concept of prerogative power, often referred to in the United Kingdom as the Royal Prerogative, consists of various powers belonging exclusively to the Crown, such as the power to make treaties or the power to declare war. The Royal Prerogative was generally said to derive from the common law. The prerogative powers are not unlimited, and they can be superseded by statute, or lost over time through disuse. A statute can completely replace a prerogative power (extinguish it), or it can merely define how decisions should be made, and what factors to consider, when exercising a power.

In Australia, it is generally accepted that the prerogative power is included in section 61 of the Constitution of Australia, the section which vests the executive power of Australia in the Crown and the Governor-General of Australia as the Crown's representative. By convention, the executive functions of government in Australia are carried out from day to day by the Government of Australia.

=== The Tampa affair ===
On 26 August 2001, the MV Tampa rescued 433 people, asylum seekers bound for Australia, and of mainly Afghani background, from their wooden fishing boat. The boat was sinking in international waters about 140 kilometres north of Christmas Island (an Australian territory). Initially the Captain sought to take the rescuees to Indonesia, but they objected, with some threatening to commit suicide if they were not taken to Australia. Some of the people required medical attention, and the Tampa then proceeded to the nearest port, at Christmas Island. The Tampa stopped at the boundary of Australia's territorial sea (twelve nautical miles offshore) to request permission to enter Australian waters and unload the asylum seekers, but permission was refused.

On 29 August, the Tampa declared a state of emergency and entered Australian waters. About four nautical miles offshore, the ship was stopped and boarded by forty-five SAS troops, who took control of the ship and anchored it.

This action prompted the Victorian Council for Civil Liberties (VCCL) to take action. Along with Victorian solicitor Eric Vadarlis, they initiated proceedings in the Federal Court of Australia for a writ of habeas corpus, against the Government of Australia and three Ministers, the Minister for Immigration and Multicultural Affairs, Philip Ruddock, the Attorney-General of Australia, Daryl Williams, and the Minister for Defence, Peter Reith. During the proceedings, Amnesty International and the Human Rights and Equal Opportunity Commission intervened in the case, generally supporting VCCL and Vadarlis.

The various Government parties were represented by a team of lawyers including the Solicitor-General of Australia, David Bennett AO QC. VCCL and Vadarlis were represented by a number of barristers well known for their public involvement in refugee law and pro bono work for refugees, including Julian Burnside QC.

=== Initial proceedings ===
The applications were made in Melbourne on 31 August, at 5.00 p.m. Melbourne time, and the court was convened by 5.40 p.m., with Judge North presiding. Both VCCL and Vadarlis argued that the court should immediately make an order preventing the Government from removing the Tampa from Australian waters. North thought there was a strong basis for making such an order, but decided that he would make a final decision the next morning. Nevertheless, North warned that the asylum seekers should not be moved off the Tampa in the meantime, and this had the effect of a temporary injunction.

The court reconvened on the morning of 1 September, but while proceedings were underway, Prime Minister John Howard announced the Pacific Solution, under which the asylum seekers on the Tampa would be transferred to Nauru and New Zealand. As such, the Government asked that the case should be concluded that day, so that the Solution could be implemented. North decided that the trial should start the following day, on 2 September.

=== Trial ===
Over the night of 1 September, VCCL, Vadarlis and the Government agreed upon a statement of facts for the case, so that the proceedings could run faster. Approximately 100 people were involved on the Government side alone in working on the statement and preparing documents for the next morning's hearing. The trial started later in the morning, and the court started hearing evidence, but later that day it was announced that under the Pacific Solution, the Government planned to transfer the asylum seekers to HMAS Manoora in order to carry them to Port Moresby for transfer to Nauru and New Zealand.

The issue of the injunction (which prevented the removal of the Tampa or the people on it) was still outstanding, and an agreement could not be reached. North sent the parties to mediation, and that evening an agreement was reached, which allowed the Government to transfer the asylum seekers to the Manoora.

VCCL and Vadarlis made two main arguments. Firstly, they argued that the provisions of the Migration Act 1958 (which regulates immigration) applied to the asylum seekers, and the normal procedures for dealing with other non-citizens should be applied. The Migration Act did empower the Government to detain all non-citizens, under the system of mandatory detention, but it also gave non-citizens certain rights, such as the right to seek asylum and to apply for protection visas. As such, they argued that the asylum seekers should be taken to the mainland and be allowed to apply for visas. Alternatively, they argued that if the Migration Act did not apply to the situation of these asylum seekers, then they were being detained unlawfully, and that no-one in Australia, regardless of their citizenship status, could be detained unlawfully or arbitrarily, and so they should be released.

On the other hand, the Government argued that the non-citizens (whom they described as "unlawful non-citizens") were not being detained at all, and contended that they were free to go anywhere they pleased, with the exception of Australia. They also argued that even if the non-citizens were being detained, then despite there being no statutory authority for their detention, the Government had a prerogative power to expel non-citizens from Australian waters.

=== Judgment at trial ===
Justice North delivered his decision on 11 September 2001.

North decided that the asylum seekers (which he referred to as "rescuees") were in fact being detained by the Government. He found that the Government did indeed intend to control the rescuees, by directing the Tampa where it could go, by closing the port at Christmas Island, and by making decisions about what would happen to them without consulting them. North added that "the presence of 45 SAS troops, armed and in combat fatigues, is likely to have led the rescuees to the conclusion that they were bound to do as they were told."

North then considered whether there was a prerogative power which could be exercised to detain the asylum seekers. He found that it was unlikely that such a power existed at all, and even if it once did, then it had been replaced by the statutory scheme in the Migration Act, which now identified and regulated all the powers of the executive government to deal with non-citizens. North relied on a number of authorities, including a 1906 case of the High Court of Australia, in which Justice Barton found that "the question to-day is one of statutory authority."

Ultimately, North granted a writ of habeas corpus, which he preferred to describe more simply as "an order for release." He found that the Government had no statutory authority to detain the asylum seekers, and since there was no prerogative power to detain them, they were being held unlawfully and had to be released.

North rejected a number of other arguments based on particular provisions of the Migration Act on the basis that VCCL and Vadarlis did not have standing to make those arguments.

== Arguments ==
The Government quickly appealed to the Full Court of the Federal Court of Australia, and on 12 September an application was granted to fast-track the proceedings. The arguments were heard on 13 September.

The Government argued that Judge North had erred in his judgment on a number of matters. They argued that North had made incorrect findings of fact, and that in truth:

- the rescuees were not being detained by the SAS troops,
- in reality it was the captain of the Tampa, Arne Rinnan, who was detaining the rescuees,
- the circumstances of the rescuees were self-inflicted, and
- the rescuees were not detained because they had the option of going to Nauru or New Zealand under the Pacific Solution.

They also argued that North erred in finding that the Government did not have a prerogative power to prevent the rescuees from entering Australia, and the complementary power to detain the rescuees for the purposes of expelling them from Australia. This was the principal issue in the appeal.

The VCCL and Vadarlis again argued that if there was such a prerogative power, it had been completely replaced by the statutory scheme in the Migration Act 1958. They argued that the Act "covered the field", that is, it was so comprehensive that it demonstrated an intention to completely displace any other executive powers in the subject area (the concept of "covering the field" usually refers to the way that federal laws can displace state laws if they show an intention to be the only law with respect to the subject matter, see section 109 of the Australian Constitution).

Judge French summarised the key issues in the appeal as being:

1. "Whether the executive power of the Commonwealth authorised and supported the expulsion of the rescuees and their detention for that purpose.
2. "If there was no such executive power, whether the rescuees were subject to a restraint attributable to the Commonwealth and amenable to habeas corpus."

== Judgment ==
The Full Court handed down its decision on 18 September. Justice French delivered the majority opinion, with Justice Beaumont agreeing with him. Chief Justice Black dissented.

=== The majority ===
Justice French found that there is indeed a prerogative power to prevent the entry of non-citizens into Australia, and as a corollary, the power to do various things that are necessary to prevent such an entry. He said that:

The power to determine who may come into Australia is so central to its [Australia's] sovereignty that it is not to be supposed that the Government of the nation would lack the power conferred upon it directly by the Constitution, the ability to prevent people not part of the Australia community [sic], from entering.

French said that this "gatekeeping" function had been recognised in a number of English cases, including an 1837 case concerning the power of the Governor of Mauritius to eject non-citizens, and a 1906 case concerning the deportation of foreign workers from Canada.

French also decided that, although statutes are capable of replacing prerogative powers, the Migration Act had not replaced the prerogative power in this case. He said that the question was whether the Act "evinces a clear and unambiguous intention to deprive the Executive of the power to prevent entry bypreventing a vessel from docking at an Australian port and adopting the means necessary to achieve that result". He found that the Act was a positive conferral of executive power, and did not clearly show such an intention.

Finally, on the issue of whether a writ of habeas corpus should be issued, French said that the rescuees were not in fact under detention by the Government, and thus there could be no order made to release them. He said that "to the extent that the Commonwealth prevented the rescuees landing on Australian soil it closed a possible avenue out of a situation in which they had been placed by other factors." He also found that just because travelling to Nauru or New Zealand under the Pacific Solution was the only real exit from the situation for the rescuees, that did not mean the Government was responsible for detaining them.

=== Black's dissent ===
Chief Justice Black dissented, finding that although the executive does have the power to exclude or expel non-citizens from within the country, in Australia that power is completely contained within legislation.

Black, citing a range of authorities from case law and academic works, decided that although there probably once was a prerogative power to exclude non-citizens, it had fallen into disuse and was no longer considered a valid prerogative power by the end of the 19th century. Indeed, one source indicated that it seemed that the last time the prerogative power had been used was in 1771. He did not consider it necessary to decide conclusively whether the power still existed or not, saying that it was sufficient when considering whether legislation had superseded the power to know that it was at best questionable whether the power even remained in existence.

Ultimately, Black decided that the Migration Act, which provided "for a very comprehensive regime" about the entry into Australia of non-citizens, was exclusive and did displace any remnant of prerogative power that remained on the subject. He said that:

The conclusion to be drawn is that the parliament intended that in the field of exclusion, entry and expulsion of aliens the Act should operate to the exclusion of any executive power derived otherwise than from powers conferred by the parliament. This conclusion is all the more readily drawn having regard to what I have concluded about the nature and the uncertainty of the prerogative or executive power asserted on behalf of the Commonwealth.

As such, there was no non-statutory power to detain the rescuees, and the Government had not even attempted to rely on any statutory power in this case. Black agreed with Judge North's original conclusion that the rescuees were on the facts detained, and as such, he agreed with North's orders to release the rescuees.

== Consequences ==
On 26 September 2001, the Parliament of Australia passed the Border Protection (Validation and Enforcement Powers) Act 2001, a retrospective law which gave statutory authorisation to the actions of the Government in detaining the asylum seekers on the Tampa. This would seem to rule out any prospect of an appeal to the High Court of Australia on the matter, since the decision of North at first instance and Black in dissent at appeal were based on the fact that the Government was not exercising a statutory power.

Vadarlis did make an application for special leave to appeal to the High Court on 27 November, but the application was rejected, since by that time all of the asylum seekers had been transferred to Nauru or New Zealand, and their original detention on the Tampa could no longer be challenged. However, in refusing special leave, the court did say that the question of the validity of the new Act, and the question of the nature of the prerogative power of the Government were important questions, which should be considered in an appropriate case.

In 2004, the scheme of immigration detention in Nauru was challenged in the Supreme Court of Nauru by three detainees, in the case of Amiri v Director of Police. The detainees also sought the issue of writs of habeas corpus, but the Supreme Court found that the detention scheme under Nauru's Immigration Act 1999 was valid. The issue was appealed to the High Court of Australia (which has jurisdiction to hear appeals from Nauru under the Nauru (High Court Appeals Act) 1976), in the case of Ruhani v Director of Police (No 2), where all judges except Justice Kirby upheld the Supreme Court's decision.
