= Gustav Heiberg Simonsen =

Norwegian lawyer and politician

Gustav Heiberg Simonsen (4 April 1935 – 7 January 2018) was a Norwegian lawyer and politician for the Conservative Party.

He was born in Oslo as a son of barrister Jon Simonsen (1901–1976) and housewife Marie Louise Heiberg (1910–2007). He was the father of Marie Simonsen.

He served as a deputy representative to the Parliament of Norway from Oslo during the term 1985–1989. In early October 1985 he met regularly, covering for Anders C. Sjaastad. In total he met during 6 days of parliamentary session. He was a member of Oslo city council from 1999 to 2007 and deputy chair of Oslo Conservative Party from 2004 to 2006. He died on 7 January 2018 in Oslo, at the age of 82.
