= Per Voigt =

Norwegian ice hockey player (1931–2022)

Personal information
- Born: 12 February 1931 Oslo, Norway
- Died: 23 February 2022 (aged 91) Bærum, Norway

Sport
- Sport: Ice hockey
- Club: Templar; IK Tigrene; IF Frisk Asker
Medal record
Representing Norway
Men's ice hockey
European Championships
| Bronze medal – third place | 1951 Paris | Team |

Per Roger Voigt (12 February 1931 – 23 February 2022) was a Norwegian ice hockey player, born in Oslo, Norway. With his club IK Tigrene he became Norwegian champion twice, in 1957 and 1961. With the Norwegian national team he competed in the 1952 Winter Olympics and six times in the Ice Hockey World Championships. Their best achievement was in 1951, placing fourth in the World Championships and winning a bronze medal at the European Championships (which were part of the same tournament).

== Career ==
Voigt played for the club Templar from 1947 to 1951, for IK Tigrene from 1951 to 1969, and thereafter for one season for IF Frisk Asker. With IK Tigrene, he became Norwegian champion in 1957 and 1961.

Playing for the Norway men's national ice hockey team, he represented Norway at the 1949 Ice Hockey World Championships, where Norway placed 8th, the 1950 Ice Hockey World Championships, where Norway placed 6th, and the 1951 Ice Hockey World Championships, where Norway placed fourth. The 1951 World Championships in Paris were at the same time also European championships, and Voigt was thus part of the Norwegian national team that won a bronze medal at the 1951 Ice Hockey European Championships, behind Sweden and Switzerland.

He participated at the Winter Olympics in 1952, where the Norwegian team placed 9th. He was also part of the Norwegian team at the 1954 Ice Hockey World Championships, the 1958 Ice Hockey World Championships, and the 1962 Ice Hockey World Championships.

== Personal life ==
Voigt was born in Oslo. He was the father of Marius Voigt. He died in Bærum on 23 February 2022, at the age of 91.
