= Name of the Year =

Norwegian prize

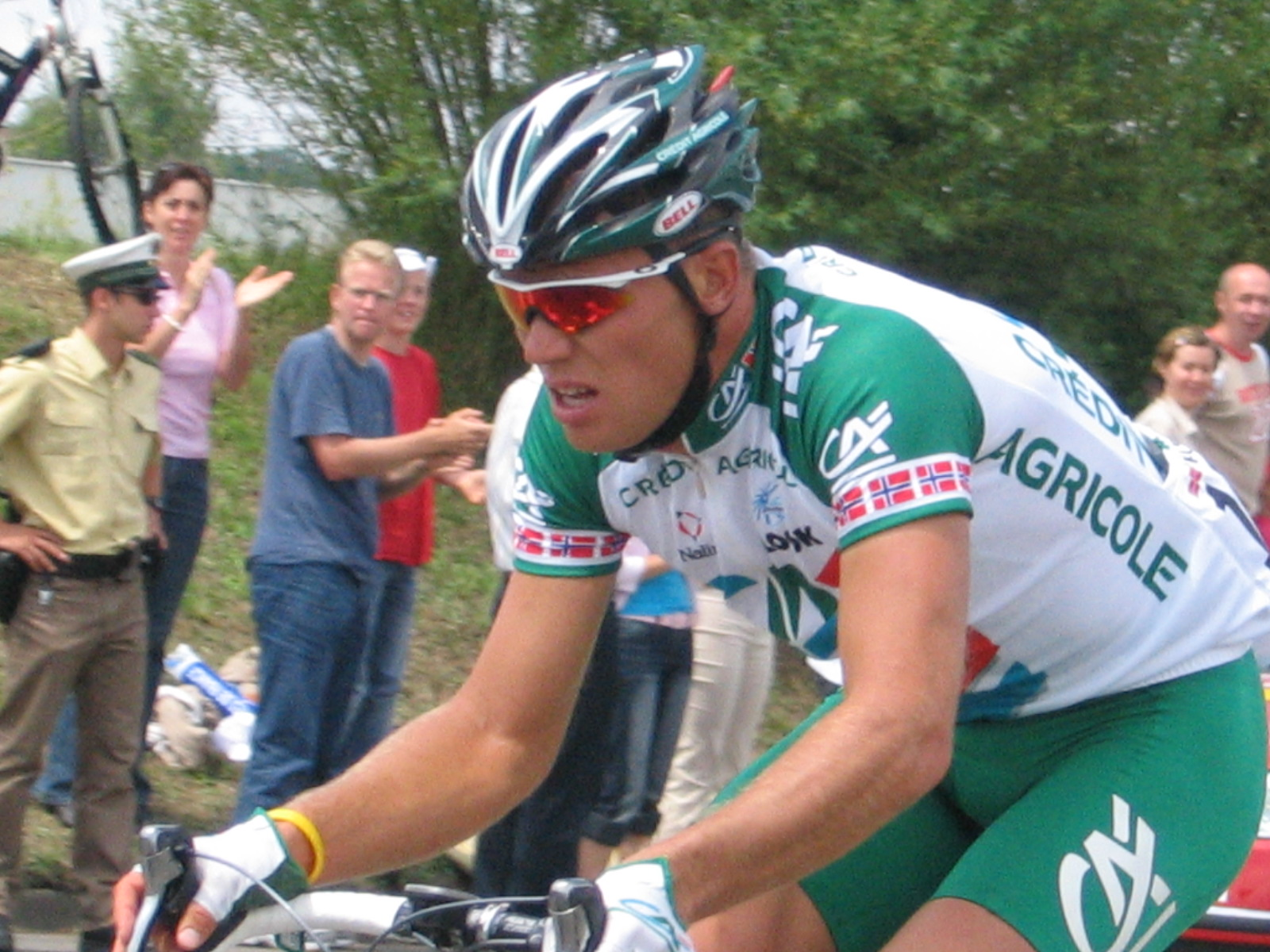
Thor Hushovd (1997 winner)

Name of the Year (Norwegian: Årets navn) is a prize awarded by one of Norway's biggest newspapers, Verdens Gang (VG). Instituted in 1974, the prize has been awarded to several persons, including King Olav V in 1975.

== Winners ==
- 1974: Jens Evensen
- 1975: King Olav V
- 1976: Kjell Thorsen – captain of the ship «Sørlandet»
- 1977: Thor Heyerdahl
- 1978: Olav Hodne
- 1979: Ingolf Stangeland
- 1980: Svein Inge Jacobsen
- 1981: Svanhild Rolfsen
- 1982: Berit Aunli
- 1983: Grete Waitz
- 1984: Steinar Øvervold
- 1985: A-ha
- 1986: Norway women's national handball team
- 1987: Edvin Rindal
- 1988: Kai Zahl
- 1989: Frelsesarmeen
- 1990: Per Hovda
- 1991: Odd Kåre Rabben
- 1992: Ola Thune
- 1993: Janikke Hundvedbakken
- 1994: Johann Olav Koss
- 1995: Anne Kristine Herje
- 1996: Anne Grosvold
- 1997: Nils Arne Eggen
- 1998: Egil «Drillo» Olsen
- 1999: Einar Eikeland
- 2000: Kadra Yusuf
- 2001: Arne Rinnan
- 2002: Robert Stoltenberg
- 2003: Petter Solberg
- 2004: Stein Magne Lian
- 2005: Heia Tufte
- 2006: Jan Egeland
- 2007: Tor Arne Lau-Henriksen
- 2008: Marit Breivik
- 2009: Magnus Carlsen
- 2010: Thor Hushovd
- 2011: The volunteers at Utøya
- 2012: Geir Lippestad
- 2013: Magnus Carlsen
- 2014: Mads Gilbert
- 2015: Robin Schaefer
- 2016: The heroes of the Mediterranean - The Norwegian contribution to the relief effort during the European migrant crisis
- 2017: King Harald V
- 2018: Else Kåss Furuseth
