= Kadra Yusuf =

Norwegian-Somali activist (born 1980)

- Born: 16 June 1980 (age 45); Somalia
- Occupation: Activist

Kadra Yosuf (born 16 June 1980), also known as Kadra Noor or Kadra Norwegian, is a Norwegian-Somali activist.

In 2000, she investigated female genital cutting in the Somali community in Norway in the documentary Norske jenter omskjæres for Rikets tilstand on TV 2. Going undercover, she exposed the support of imams in Norway for the practice. For her efforts, she received the Fritt Ord Honorary Award.

In April 2007 she called to reinterpret the Koran as far as it concerns Muslim women's rights. Several days later she was attacked by a group of Somali immigrants, both male and female, who shouted at her that she was trampling the Koran.
