= Tor Arne Lau Henriksen =

Norwegian Army officer

Tor Arne Lau Henriksen (February 22, 1974 – July 23, 2007) was a Norwegian Army officer who was killed in action in Afghanistan. Lieutenant Lau Henriksen was the first Norwegian soldier to be awarded the military cross. His name was the "Name of the Year" 2007 in Verdens Gang.

He joined Hærens Jegerkommando before he went to Afghanistan. During a mission there, Lau Henriksen was killed by members of the Taliban in Lowgar Province. He and other Norwegian soldiers were on a reconnaissance mission together with soldiers from the Afghan National Army, when they were attacked by Taliban members dressed as civilians. Lau Henriksen was shot in the chest and became the first soldier from Hærens Jegerkommando to be killed in action in Afghanistan.
