= MV Tampa =

Container ship built in 1984

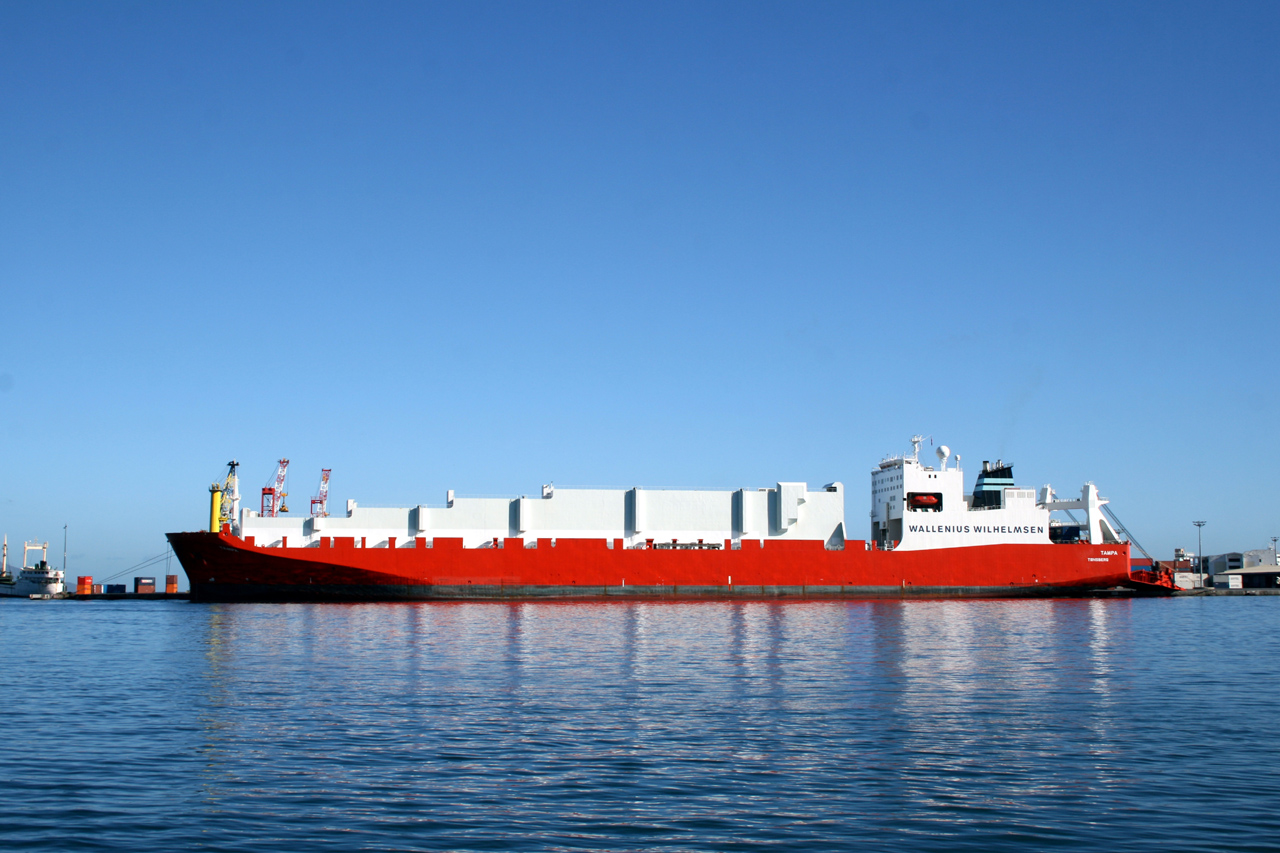
- MV Tampa at Papeete, French Polynesia

History
- Name: Tampa; Barber Tampa
- Owner: Wilhelmsen Lines Shipowning
- Port of registry: Norway
- Builder: Hyundai Heavy Industries; Ulsan, South Korea
- Yard number: 248
- Launched: 10 October 1983
- Completed: 1984
- Identification: Call sign: LMWO3; IMO number: 8204951; MMSI no.: 257497000
- Fate: Scrapped 2 August 2013

General characteristics
- Type: Container ship
- Tonnage: 39,900 DWT; 66,532 GT
- Length: 262.3 m (860 ft 7 in)
- Beam: 32.26 m (105 ft 10 in)
- Draught: 9.78 m (32 ft 1 in)
- Decks: 12
- Speed: 21 knots (39 km/h; 24 mph)
- Crew: 25

MV Tampa was a roll-on/roll-off container ship completed in 1984 by Hyundai Heavy Industries Co., Ltd. in South Korea for the Norway-based firm, Wilhelmsen Lines Shipowning.

In 2001, the vessel was at the centre of the Tampa affair when its crew rescued 433 refugees in international waters, but the Australian government refused permission for them to disembark on Christmas Island.

== Service history ==
Tampa was launched in late 1983. It was a roll-on/roll-off ship, designed to carry wheeled cargo, such as cars, motorcycles, trucks, semi-trailer trucks, buses, trailers, and railroad cars, that are driven on and off the ship on their own wheels or using a platform vehicle, such as a self-propelled modular transporter. This is in contrast to lift-on/lift-off (LoLo) vessels, which use a crane to load and unload cargo.

=== Tampa affair ===
ABC news report of the Tampa affair and its political context, October 2001.

In August 2001, under Captain Arne Rinnan, a diplomatic dispute brewed between Australia, Norway, and Indonesia after Tampa rescued 433 Afghans from a distressed fishing vessel in international waters. The Afghans wanted passage to the nearby Christmas Island. The Australian government sought to prevent this by refusing Tampa entry into Australian waters, insisting on their disembarkment elsewhere, and deploying the Special Air Service Regiment to board the ship.

At the time of the incident, Tampa carried cargo worth A$20 million, and 27 crew. The crew of Tampa later received the Nansen Refugee Award for 2002 from the United Nations High Commissioner for Refugees (UNHCR) for their efforts to follow international principles of saving people in distress at sea.

=== Cocaine smuggling bust ===
In October 2006, Tampa was one of two Wilhelmsen ships involved in a cocaine-smuggling operation intercepted by the New Zealand Customs Service and the Australian Federal Police. Twenty-seven kilograms (60 lb) of cocaine was allegedly attached to the side of the two cargo ships bound for Australia in purpose-built metal pods, although New Zealand authorities stated they did not believe the ship's crew or owners were involved.

== See also ==
- MV Taiko
- Ruddock v Vadarlis

== Bibliography ==
- David Marr, Maria Wilkinson: Dark Victory – How a government lied its way to political triumph. Allen & Unwin 2004, ISBN 978-1-74114-447-5.
