= Tordis Ørjasæter =

Norwegian literary critic (1927–2026)

- Born: Tordis Greni; 25 March 1927; Oslo, Norway
- Died: 25 March 2026 (aged 99)
- Occupations: Educationalist; literary critic; biographer; novelist
- Employer: University of Oslo
- Known for: Engagement in culture and literature for children
- Notable work: Menneskenes hjerter. Sigrid Undset – en livshistorie (1993); Nini Roll Anker, en kvinne i tiden (2000)
- Children: Elin Ørjasæter
- Relatives: Tore Ørjasæter (father-in-law)
- Awards: Brage Prize (1993)

Tordis Ørjasæter (25 March 1927 – 25 March 2026) was a Norwegian literary critic, biographer, professor of educational science, and novelist. She was particularly engaged in culture and literature for children. Ørjasæter wrote biographical works on Sigrid Undset, Selma Lagerlöf, Tove Jansson, and Nini Roll Anker. She was awarded the Brage Prize in 1993.

== Background ==
Born in Oslo on 25 March 1927, Ørjasæter was a daughter of lecturer Toralf Greni and Agnes Morch. In 1953 she married author and journalist Jo Ørjasæter (1925–2006). Her father-in-law was author Tore Ørjasæter (1886–1968). She was the mother of Elin Ørjasæter.

== Career ==
Ørjasæter graduated as cand.mag. from the University of Oslo in 1957. From 1957 to 1970 she was assigned as critic for the newspaper Nationen. She published the book Med barn i teater in 1959. As a columnist for the newspaper Dagbladet, she wrote about children's programs in radio and television in the regular column På bølgelengde. From 1971 to 1977 she was literary critic for Dagbladet, responsible for children's and young adult literature.

In 1976, she issued the book Boka om Dag Tore, treating challenges with children with disabilities, based on experience with her oldest son who had been diagnosed as autistic. In 1978, she wrote the book Barn og bøker, and in 1981 the book Barn, kultur, kreativitet, jointly with Barbro Sæterdal. In 1981 she also wrote a work for UNESCO, The Role of Children's Books on Integrating Handicapped Children into Everyday Life, as well as the main chapter in Den norske barnelitteraturen gjennom 200 år. She was awarded the honorary prize Askeladden from the institution Norsk Barneforum in 1981.

Her 1985 book Møte med Tove Jansson was followed by a biography of Sigrid Undset, Menneskenes hjerter, which also earned her the Brage Prize in the category general literature in 1993. A follow-up book, Sigrid Undset og Roma, came in 1996. She contributed to the work Norges Litteraturhistorie, writing about children's literature up to 1980. In 2000, she wrote the biography Nini Roll Anker, en kvinne i tiden, jointly with her husband Jo Ørjasæter. She wrote the novel En borgerlig pike in 2001. In 2005, she published Inn i barndomslandet – Selma Lagerlöf – Tove Jansson – Sigrid Undset. In 2009, she published the book Dagen og dagene. In her last book, Stadig fortsetter jeg å leve, which was issued in 2024 when she was 97 years old, she reflected on getting older, on literature, and on time that had passed.

A lecturer at Statens spesiallærerhøgskole from 1977, she was appointed professor at the University of Oslo from 1991 to 1993. She was a board member of the publishing house Aschehoug from 1982 to 1996, and was member of the editorial group of the magazine Gymnadenia from 1997 to 2003.

Ørjasæter died on 25 March 2026, her 99th birthday.

== Selected works ==
- Med barn i teater, 1959
- Massemediene og barneboken, 1971
- Boka om Dag Tore, 1976
- Barn og bøker, 1978
- Barn, kultur, kreativitet (with Barbro Sætersdal), 1981
- The Role of Children’s Books in Integrating Handicapped Children into Everyday Life, 1981
- "Barne- og ungdomslitteraturen fram til vår egen tid", in Den norske barnelitteraturen gjennom 200 år, 1981
- Møte med Tove Jansson, 1985
- Menneskenes hjerter. Sigrid Undset – en livshistorie, 1993
- Sigrid Undset og Roma, 1996
- "Den norske barnelitteraturen fram til 1980", in Norges Litteraturhistorie, volume 7, 1997
- Nini Roll Anker, en kvinne i tiden (with Jo Ørjasæter), 2000
- En borgerlig pike, 2001
- Inn i barndomslandet. Selma Lagerlöf – Tove Jansson – Sigrid Undset, 2005
- Dagen og dagene, 2009
- Menneskenes hjerter, 2011
- Den yngste. En Legende, 2012
- Kjærligheten har sitt eget språk. En mors fortelling, 2017
- Stadig fortsetter jeg å leve, 2024
