= Ørnulf Opdahl =

Norwegian painter and educator (born 1944)

Ørnulf Opdahl (born 5 January 1944) is a Norwegian painter and educator. He was born in Ålesund. He is represented in several art collections, including the National Gallery of Norway, Bergen Art Museum and the Astrup Fearnley Museum of Modern Art. He was appointed professor at the Norwegian National Academy of Fine Arts from 1985 to 1992.
