= Eli Telhaug =

Norwegian civil servant (born 1962)

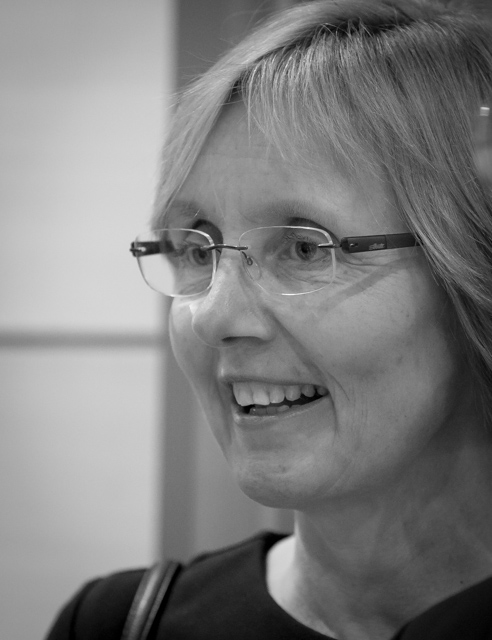
- Telhaug in 2017
- Born: 5 October 1962 (age 63)
- Education: economist
- Occupation: civil servant

Eli Telhaug (born 5 October 1962) is a Norwegian civil servant.

She held administrative positions in the Ministry of Finance from 1996 to 2007. She was appointed assistant secretary in the Ministry of Education and Research from 2007 to 2012, further permanent secretary in the Ministry of Children, Equality and Social Inclusion from 2012 to 2016, and from 2016 she was permanent secretary in the Ministry of Labour.
