= Øystein Stray Spetalen =

Norwegian investor

- Born: 17 June 1962 (age 64); Sandefjord, Norway
- Education: Norwegian Institute of Technology
- Occupations: Businessman and investor

Øystein Stray Spetalen (born 17 June 1962) is a Norwegian businessman and investor.

== Personal life and education ==
Spetalen was born in Sandefjord on 17 June 1962. He is educated as petroleum engineer from the Norwegian Institute of Technology.

== Career ==
Spetalen operates via the investment company Tycoon Industrier, which he established in 1995, and the umbrella company Ferncliff, and has significant ownerships in Norwegian industries.

He is listed on the magazine Kapital's list of the 400 wealthiest persons in Norway. In 2022 he was listed third among the persons with highest income in Norway.

Spetalen was a board member of the football club Vålerenga Fotball from 1996 to 2003, and has been among the investors supporting the club financially.
