= Marie Simonsen =

Norwegian journalist (born 1962)

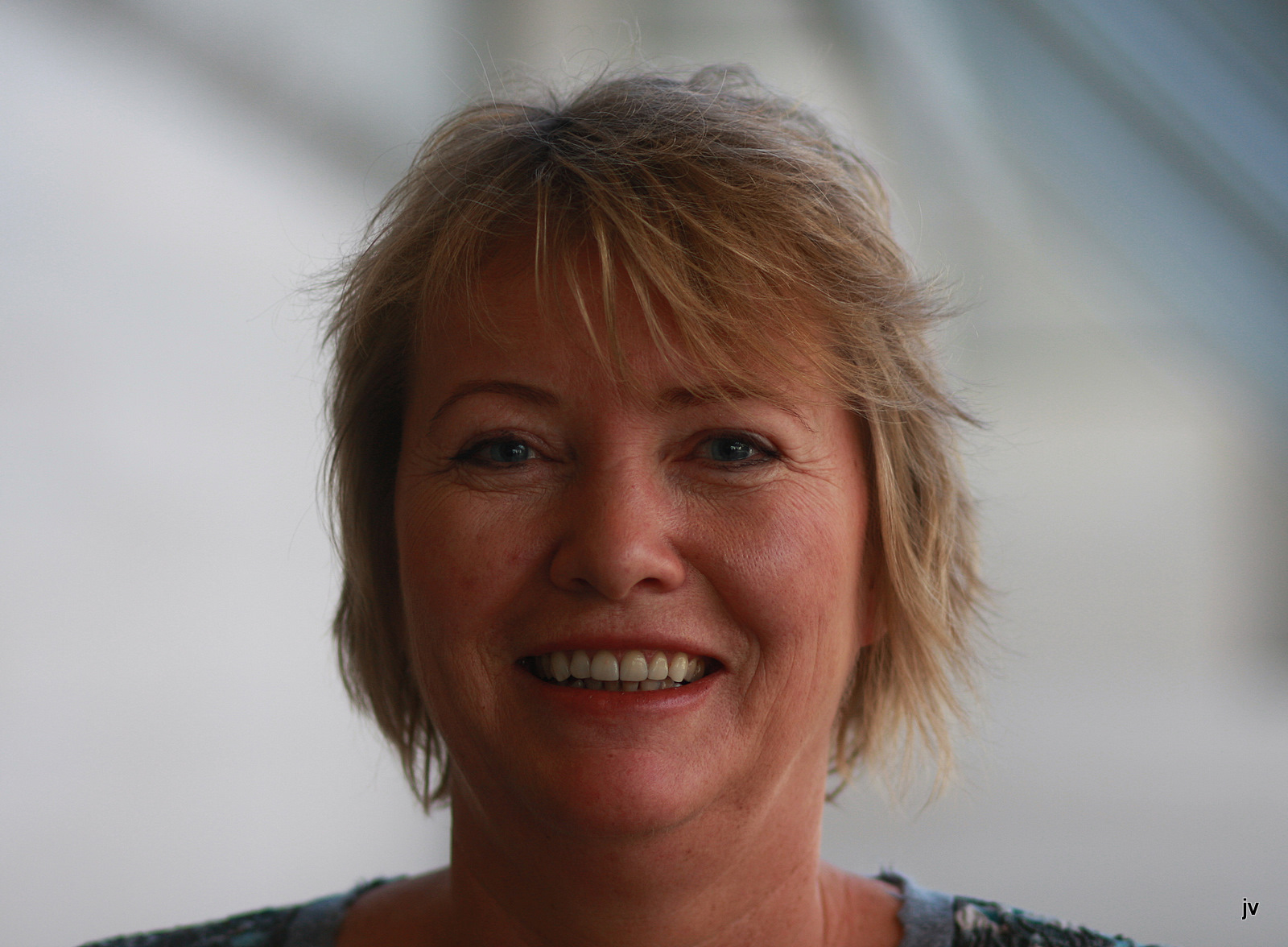
Marie Simonsen in 2009

Marie Heiberg Simonsen (born 1 June 1962) is a Norwegian journalist who since 2003 has been political editor in Dagbladet. She has previously worked for Dagens Næringsliv and VG.

== Early life, education and career ==
Simonsen was born in Bodø and grew up on the west side of Oslo. Her father is the lawyer and Conservative politician Gustav Heiberg Simonsen.

She studied law, literature and political science at the University of Oslo 1983–1985. She started working as a journalist in Dagens Næringsliv in 1985 after having been recruited by Kåre Valebrokk. She headed the feature department for a while and was the paper's correspondent in London 1994–1997. She worked for VG 1997–2003 where she became head of the newspaper's commentary section. She has also held causeries in NRK radio. She participated in founding the Norwegian Foundation for Investigative Journalism (SKUP) in 1990.

== Views ==
Simonsen has described her general political positions as in accordance with the liberal tradition of Dagbladet. She does not have any fixed preference for a particular political party. She has named Gro Harlem Brundtland as a role model.

A feminist, she favours affirmative action for women and opposes cash-for-care benefits for the parents of toddlers which she believes hinders gender equality and integration of immigrant women and their children. Simonsen has expressed concern that women who are public figures are subject to more threats and harassment both online and in real life than men and that this causes women to stay away from public debate. Having experienced much internet harassment as well as real life threats, Simonsen has voiced concern that women in public life experience more and graver cyberbullying and threats than men, and that this may cause many women to stay out of public debate. She opposes the Norwegian monarchy and the Norwegian state church.

In 2007, Simonsen commented on the paramedics incident in Oslo 2007 and wrote that the paramedics that refused aid to Ali Farah would not have behaved in the same way if Farah had been the ethnic Norwegian Hydro CEO Eivind Reiten. She further wrote: "This week, we were forced to see what we didn't want to see. It was the ugly and unmerciful effect of racism". One of the paramedics sued Dagbladet for their coverage of the incident and in 2014, the Supreme Court of Norway ordered Dagbladet to pay Erik Schjenken, one of the two paramedics, 200,000 Norwegian kroner in compensation for false allegations of racism, based on the commentary of Simonsen and two other writers for the paper. Dagbladet and other media leaders and journalists have called the ruling a threat to free journalism.

== Books ==
- Marie Simonsen and Ingunn Yssen (2010): Bråk! Den store likestillingssvindelen. Aschehoug Forlag. ISBN 9788203291845
