= Henning Kramer Dahl =

Norwegian poet, essayist and translator

- Born: 29 April 1962; Oslo, Norway
- Died: 7 March 2017 (aged 54)
- Occupations: Poet, translator and essayist

Henning Kramer Dahl (29 April 1962 – 7 March 2017) was a Norwegian poet, essayist and translator.

Dahl was born in Oslo. He made his literary debut in 1983 with the poetry collection Barfrost, with poems rich in spiritual metaphors. His next collections, Dansestykker for legeme og stillhet (1984) and Et annet rom et annet hjerte (1987), contain love poems and poems about nature. In 1989 he published the satirical collection Hvite lam. Later collections are Solsikkemuskel (1991), Værhårmusikk (1995), Hundehymner, benhuspoesi (2000) and Månen er borte (2003). His essay collection Tiden leger alle sår was published in 1996. He has translated poetry into Norwegian language, including works of Leonard Cohen, Sylvia Plath, Fernando Pessoa and Derek Walcott.

He resided at Stabekk. He died from heart failure in March 2017.
