= Alf Bakken =

Norwegian politician (born 1962)

Alf Bakken (born 27 June 1962) is a Norwegian politician for the Progress Party.

He served as a deputy representative to the Parliament of Norway from Vestfold during the term 1989–1993. In total he met during 41 days of parliamentary session.
