= Margot O'Neill =

Australian journalist, writer and producer

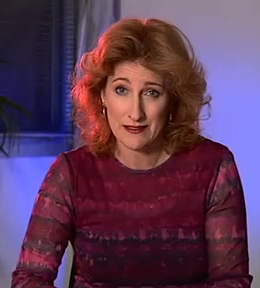
- O'Neill in 2001
- Born: 16 May 1958 (age 67); Leongatha, Victoria, Australia
- Education: University of Melbourne
- Occupations: Senior Investigative Journalist (Print, radio and television) Currently at Lateline Australian Broadcasting Corporation (ABC)
- Parent(s): Ray O'Neill (1923-2007), Gloria O'Neill (born 1924)

Margot O'Neill (born 16 May 1958) is an Australian journalist, writer and producer. She founded Original Thinking Productions, a multi-platform content provider after leaving the ABC in 2019 where she was a journalist for over 25 years. O’Neill worked as a journalist for nearly 40 years in television, radio, newspapers and online in Australia and overseas covering politics, national security and social justice issues and has worked on a variety of ABC programs including the investigative flagship program, Four Corners. O'Neill twice won Australia's Walkley Awards including for Best Investigative Reporting as well as four human rights awards. She also wrote a book called Blind Conscience (UNSW Press 2008) telling the stories of some of the key players in Australia's refugee advocacy movement. It won the 2009 Human Rights award for best non-fiction. She has a Bachelor of Arts (Politics) degree from the University of Melbourne. She was a Journalist Fellow at the University of Oxford.

== Early life, education and personal life ==
Margot O’Neill is one of five children who grew up in Gippsland, Victoria. She is married to Dr Ken Hudson and lives in Sydney. She has one daughter, Molly, and a step-daughter, Charlotte.

== Professional career ==
An ABC Lateline report on the Tampa affair narrated by O'Neill

O’Neill founded Original Thinking Productions in 2019 after leaving a career as a journalist with the Australian Broadcasting Corporation, ABC.

She started out as a journalist for radio 3RRR FM in Melbourne before moving to The Age newspaper and then to the ABC where she covered Australian politics in Canberra. She also covered US politics in Washington DC and the South Pacific and worked at Four Corners before joining Lateline and finally, the ABC Investigations Unit.

== Awards ==
- 1998 - UNAA Media Award - TV Current Affairs - Margot O'Neill, Four Corners ABC TV, - 'Death Sentence'
- 2002 - UNAA Media Peace Award - Finalist - Best Television - Margot O'Neill, Lateline ABC TV, - 'Curtin Tape'
- 2002 - Walkley Award Winner (Television) - TV Current Affairs Reporting (Less Than 10 Minutes), 'Curtin Tape', Australian Broadcasting Corporation -The Australian Women's Register - Walkley Awards
- 2003 - LOGIE Finalist Most Outstanding Public Affairs program Lateline ABC
- 2005 - Human Rights Commission winner TV 'Vivian Solon' Lateline ABC
- 2005 - Walkley Finalist TV Current Affairs (less than 20 mins) 'Vivian Solon' Lateline ABC
- 2005 - Walkley Award Winner (All Media) - Investigative Journalism, 'Vivian Solon', Lateline ABC (with Hamish Fitzsimmons, Tom Iggulden & Lisa Millar) National Library of Australia - Trove
- 2006 - LOGIE Finalist Most Outstanding News Coverage 'Vivian Solon' Lateline ABC TV
- 2006 - Walkley Social Equity Journalism Commendation 'Sex Abuse of the Elderly' Lateline ABC
- 2006 - UNAA Media Peace Award - Finalist - Best Television - News - Margot O'Neill & Michael Edwards, ABC TV Lateline – 'Belgrade Exile', United Nations Association of Australia
- 2007 - LOGIE Finalist Most Outstanding News Coverage 'Sexual Abuse of the Elderly' Lateline ABC
- 2008 -Walkley Finalist Best TV Current Affairs (under 20 mins) 'Tragic Story of Tony Tran' Lateline ABC
- 2009 - John Button Prize - Short Listed - Margot O'Neill: Blind Conscience (UNSW Press)
- 2009 - National Human Rights Award for Best Non-Fiction - Winner - Blind Conscience (UNSW Press)
- 2010 - Donald McDonald ABC Reuters Journalism Institute Fellowship to Oxford University - University of Oxford - Fellowships
- 2012 - Walkley Finalist Social Equity Journalism 'Aged Drugs' Lateline ABC
- 2013 - Human Rights Commission Finalist 'Aged Care Crisis' Lateline ABC
- 2013 - UNAA Media Award - TV Current Affairs - Margot O'Neill, Lateline ABC TV, - 'Aged Care Crisis'
