= Wallenius Wilhelmsen =

Shipping and logistics company

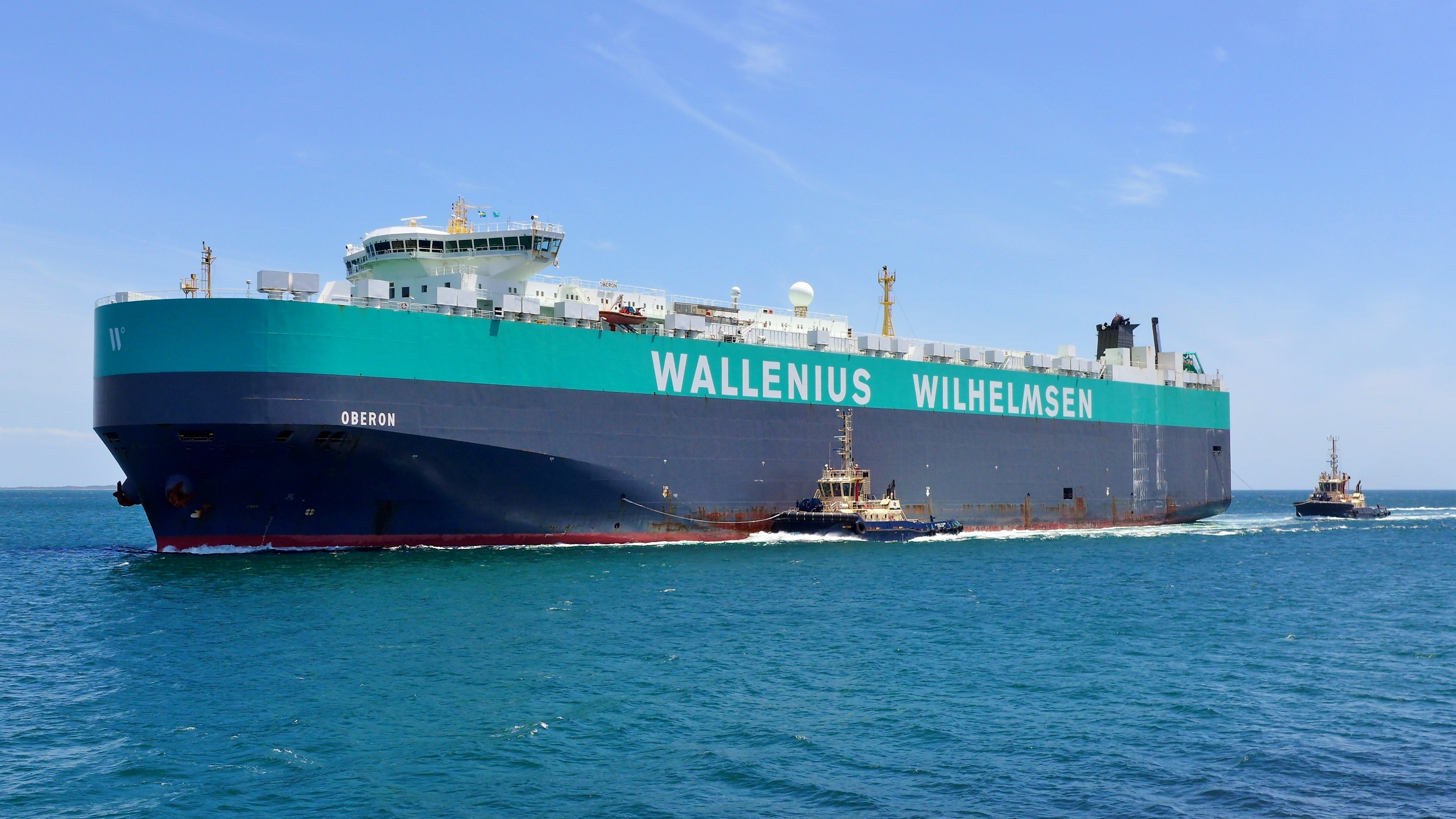
- MV Oberon, one of Wallenius Wilhelmsen's ships
- Industry: Shipping
- Headquarters: Sweden/Norway
- Revenue: US$3.9 billion (2019)
- Number of employees: 9400 (2019)
- Website: https://www.walleniuswilhelmsen.com

Wallenius Wilhelmsen is a Sweden/Norway-based global RoRo shipping and vehicle logistics company, managing the distribution of cars, trucks, rolling equipment, Mafi trailers and breakbulk globally.

== Overview ==
The Wallenius Wilhelmsen group trades under the main brands of Wallenius Wilhelmsen Ocean and Wallenius Wilhelmsen Solutions (formerly known as Wallenius Wilhelmsen Logistics), EUKOR, American Roll-on Roll-off Carrier (ARC), United European Car Carriers (UECC) and Armacup.

Total income for 2019 was USD 3.9 billion with 9,400 employees worldwide. They control 126 vessels servicing 15 trade routes to six continents, together with a global inland distribution network, 120 processing centers, and 11 marine terminals.

== See also ==
- Roll-on/roll-off
- List of roll-on/roll-off vessel accidents
- Nippon Yusen Kaisha (NYK)
- K Line
- Mitsui O.S.K. Lines (MOL)
- Hyundai Glovis
- Siem Shipping
- Grimaldi Group
- Messina Line
