= Marius Voigt =

Norwegian ice hockey player

Personal information
- Born: 20 February 1962 (age 64) Oslo, Norway

Sport
- Sport: Ice hockey

Marius Voigt (born 20 February 1962) is a Norwegian former ice hockey player. He was born in Oslo, Norway as the son of Per Voigt, and played for the club IF Frisk Asker. He played for the Norwegian national ice hockey team at the 1988 Winter Olympics.
