= Tor Arne Bell Ljunggren =

Norwegian politician (born 1962)

Tor Arne Bell Ljunggren (born 6 June 1962) is a Norwegian politician for the Labour Party.

He served as a deputy representative to the Parliament of Norway from Nordland during the term 2013–2017. In total he met during 127 days of parliamentary session. He hails from Bodø Municipality.
