= Ola Braanaas =

Norwegian fish farmer

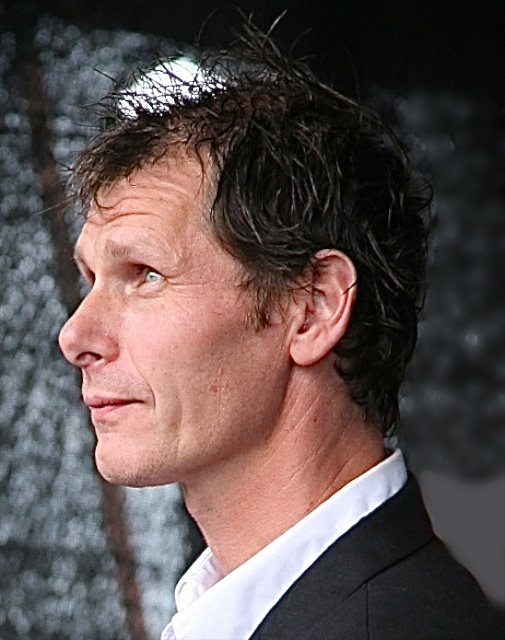
- Born: 21 July 1962 (age 63); Hamar, Norway
- Occupation: Fish farmer

Ola Braanaas (born 21 July 1962) is a Norwegian fish farmer. He is founder and owner of the fish farming company Firda Seafood Group.

== Personal life and education ==
Born in Hamar in 1962, Braanaas attended Fiskarfagskulen, followed by studies of aquaculture and marine biology at the Bodø University College, further agricultural education, and then pedagogy at the Oppland College. In his youth he was an active member of Red Youth, and played in the punk band Klegg.

== Career ==
Braanaas established the company Firda Settefisk in Gulen Municipality in 1986. Since then he has been involved in various companies in the fish farming business, and is founder and owner of Firda Seafood.

He is listed on the magazine Kapital's list of the 400 wealthiest persons in Norway.

In 2007 he acquired a statue of king Olav V, sculpted by Knut Steen, after the statue had been rejected by the Oslo Municipality. The statue was subsequently erected in Skjerjehamn on the island of Sandøyna in Gulen Municipality and unveiled on 4 August 2007.

In December 2021, Braanaas announced that he would change his legal address to Bø i Vesterålen, drawn by the Northern Norwegian municipality's low local taxes.
