= Rikets tilstand =

Norwegian TV documentary series

- Genre: Documentary; Investigative journalism
- Created by: Gerhard Helskog
- Country of origin: Norway
- Original language: Norwegian
- No. of seasons: 4
- No. of episodes: 36

Original release
- Network: TV 2
- Release: 30 September 1999 – 11 December 2002

Related
- Dokument 2

Rikets tilstand ("State of the Realm") is a Norwegian investigative documentary series that aired on TV 2 from 1999 to 2002. The host was Gerhard Helskog, former host of Dokument 2. The series premiered on 30 September 1999.

Rikets tilstand won a SKUP diploma and the Gullruten award for best documentary for the two-part episode Norske jenter omskjæres (2000), about Norwegian Muslim girls being subjected to female genital mutilation with the secret approval of imams.

The series became subject to a scandal in 2002 after an episode made unsubstantiated allegations of doping in the Norwegian national skiing team. The series was also tarnished for sparking a moral panic following an episode in 2001 alleging the now-discredited link between the MMR vaccine and autism. Helskog was himself sued for libel (although eventually acquitted) by Jan Simonsen, who claimed the series had directly resulted in him being expelled from the Progress Party.
