= Ørnulf Seippel =

Norwegian sociologist

Ørnulf Seippel (born 1962) is a Norwegian sociologist. He is currently a researcher at Norwegian Social Research and Professor II at the Norwegian University of Science and Technology, where he was professor of sociology and political science from 2007 to 2009. He has published books and articles on sociology of sport, the environment and social movements.

== Publications ==
- The Fine Art of Coaching: Instructions, Social Support or Democratic Participation? European Journal for Sport and Society 2/2008
- Sports in Civil Society: Networks, Social Capital and Influence. European Sociological Review 1/2008
- Sport and Social Capital. Acta Sociologica 2/2006
- The Meanings of Sport: Fun, Health, Beauty or Community?. Sport in Society. 1/2006
- Norsk idrett: Organisasjon, fellesskap, politikk, 2005
- Sport, Civil Society and Social Integration. Journal of Civil Society. 3/2005
- The World According to Voluntary Sport Organizations: Voluntarism, Facilities and Economy. International Review for the Sociology of Sport 2/2004
- Sosiale bevegelser: Innføring, oversikt, utfordringer. Sosiologisk tidsskrift 2/2003
- Integrating and Articulating Environments: A Challenge for Northern and Southern Europe., 2003
- Idrettens bevegelser. Sosiologiske studier av idrett i et moderne samfunn., 2002
- Sports and Nationalism in a Globalized World. International Journal of Sociology 2017
