= Elin Ørjasæter =

Norwegian writer (born 1962)

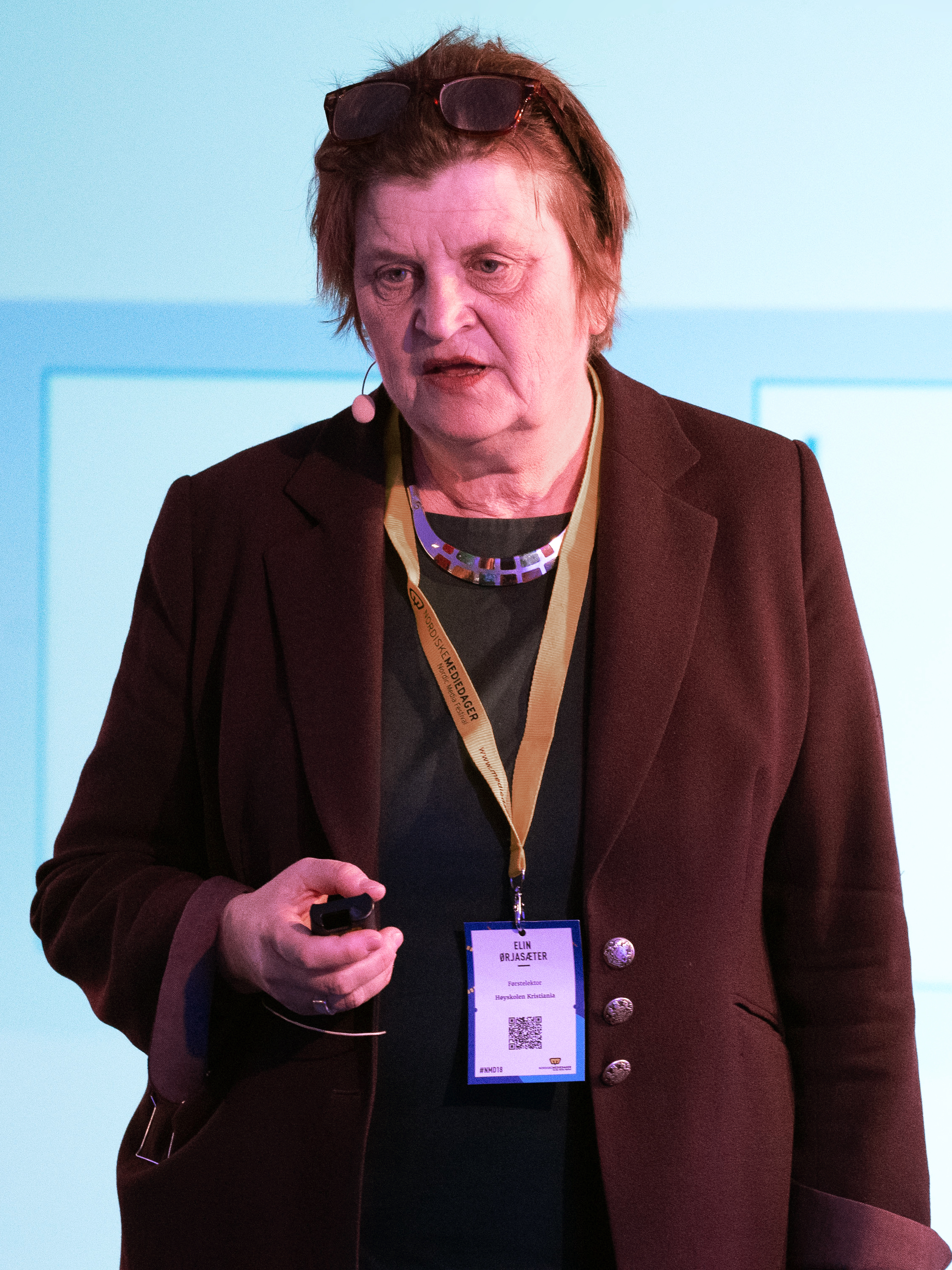
- Born: 25 February 1962 (age 64); Bærum, Norway
- Education: University of Oslo
- Occupations: Children's writer, columnist, non-fiction writer and lecturer
- Parent: Tordis Ørjasæter

Elin Ørjasæter (born 25 February 1962) is a Norwegian children's writer, columnist, non-fiction writer and lecturer, and participant in contemporary debates in writing, speaking and television debates.

== Biography ==
Ørjasæter was born in Bærum on 25 February 1962, a daughter of Tordis Ørjasæter. She graduated as cand.philol. in human geography from the University of Oslo in 1989. From 2005 to 2007 she was a manager in the publishing house N. W. Damm & Søn. From 2007 to 2012 she was assigned as columnist for the online business newspaper E24 Næringsliv, and since 2012 she has been appointed as lecturer for the institution Campus Kristiania. She was a member of the Norwegian Broadcasting Council 2014–2017. In 2004 she was a board member of the Norwegian Boxing Federation. Her publications include the children's books Larry (1992) and Ikke ta Maika (1994), Lederboka from 2008, and Det glade vanvidd from 2011.

In 2024 she took part in the television reality show Norges dummeste.
