= SKUP Award =

Norwegian journalism award

- Native name: SKUP-prisen
- Description: Norwegian journalism award recognizing excellence in investigative journalism
- Country: Norway
- Presented by: Norwegian Foundation for Investigative Journalism (SKUP)
- Website: http://www.skup.no

The SKUP Award (Norwegian: SKUP-prisen) is a Norwegian journalism award. It has been awarded annually since 1990 by the Norwegian Foundation for Investigative Journalism (Norwegian: Stiftelsen for en kritisk og undersøkende presse; SKUP).

The award is a cube designed by Norwegian craftsman and goldsmith Synnøve Korssjøen, along with prize money.
