= 1943 in Norway =

- Centuries: 18th; 19th; 20th; 21st
- Decades: 1920s; 1930s; 1940s; 1950s; 1960s
- See also: List of years in Norway

Events in the year 1943 in Norway.

== Incumbents ==
- Government in Exile (in London)
  - Monarch – Haakon VII.
  - Prime Minister – Johan Nygaardsvold (Labour Party)
- German Military Governor
  - Reichskommissar in Norway – Josef Terboven
- German Puppet Government in Oslo
  - Minister-President – Vidkun Quisling (National Unification)

== Events ==
- 5 February – The Norwegian submarine HNoMS Uredd is destroyed by a German minefield. The 39 men aboard as well as six Special Operations Executive (SOE) agents are killed in the sinking. The wreck of the submarine was only discovered in 1985.
- 22 February – The collaborationist Quisling regime approves the Lov om nasjonal arbeidsinnsats (English: 'Law of national work effort') according to which all men between ages 18–55 and all women between ages 21–40, are required to enlist.
- 24 February – 158 Norwegian Jews are deported from Norway to German extermination camps.
- 28 February – Operation Gunnerside: Six Norwegian SOE agents led by Joachim Rønneberg successfully attack the heavy water plant at Vemork.
- 24 July – An allied air raid completely destroys the aluminium and magnesium plants in Herøya being built by Norsk Hydro in cooperation with Luftwaffe-operated Nordische Aluminium Aktiengesellschaft (Nordag). 55 construction workers are killed.
- 28 July – MTB 345, a motor torpedo boat operated by the exiled Royal Norwegian Navy, is captured by the Germans off Western Norway. The seven-man Norwegian-British crew was executed in Bergen two days later based on Adolf Hitler's Commando Order
- 21 September – Operation Source: British midget submarines attack the German battleship Tirpitz, at anchor in the Kåfjord, crippling her for six months.
- 30 September – the sinking of the Hurtigruten passenger ship Sanct Svithun by Allied aircraft leads to heavy protests from the Norwegian resistance movement.
- 16 November – 160 American bombers strike a hydro-electric power facility and heavy water factory in Vemork, Norway.
- 26 December – the German battleship Scharnhorst is sunk off of Norway's North Cape after a battle against major Royal Navy forces.

=== Gallery ===
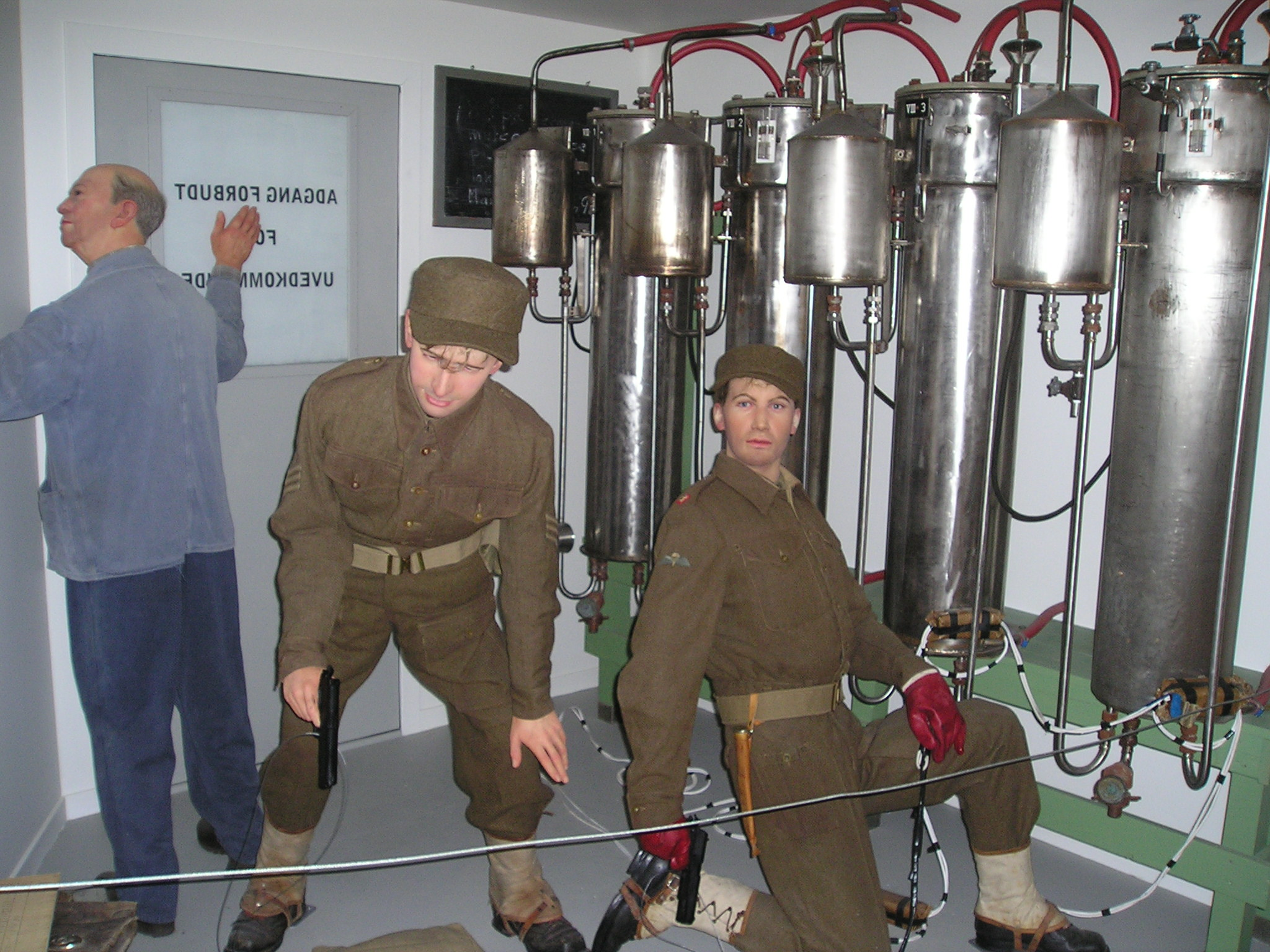
A reconstruction of the Operation Gunnerside team planting explosives to destroy the cascade of electrolysis chambers.

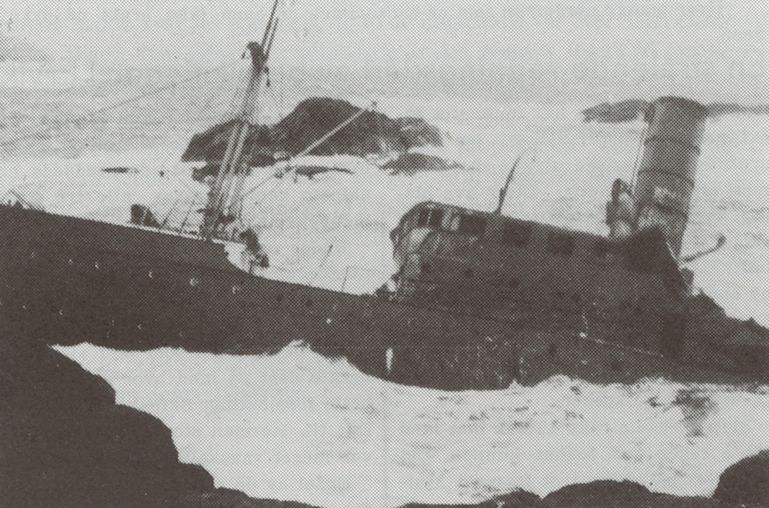
Sanct Svithun beached and sinking after 30 September attack.

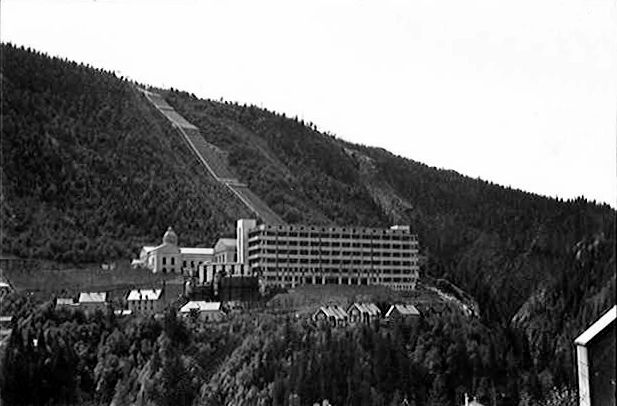
160 American bombers bombed this hydro-electric power facility and heavy water factory in German-controlled Vemork on 16 November.

== Notable births ==
=== January ===
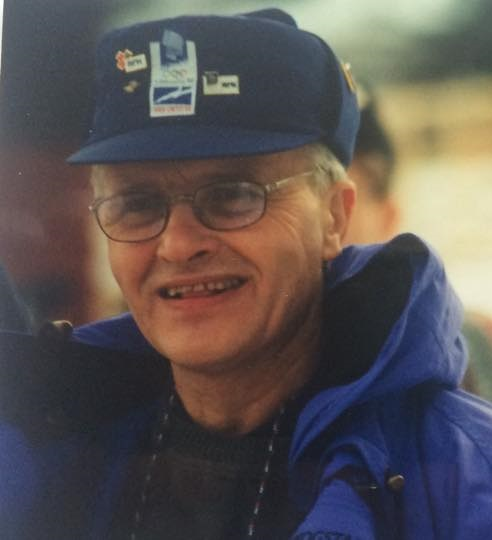
Einar Førde

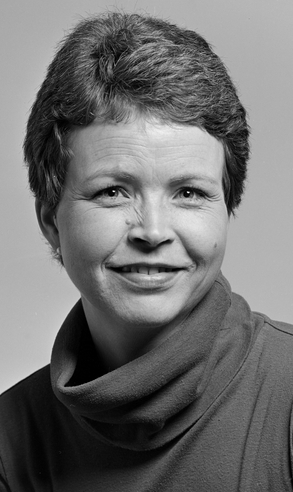
Ragnhild Nilstun

- 4 January – Kristin Brudevoll, literary scholar and organizational leader.
- 9 January – Odd Magnus Faltinsen, mathematician and professor of marine technology.
- 11 January
  - Jon Bakken, politician
  - Roald Jensen, footballer (died 1987).
- 16 January – Tore Schweder, statistician.
- 18 January – Egil Egebakken, visual artist (died 2024).
- 19 January – Gro Hillestad Thune, jurist and politician
- 20 January
  - Torkjell Berulfsen, television personality
  - Einar Førde, politician and Minister (died 2004).
- 25 January – Tore Planke, engineer, inventor and businessperson.
- 26 January – Erik Must, stock broker and investor.
- 27 January
  - Steinar Gil, philologist and diplomat
  - Eva Heir, politician.
- 28 January – Håkon Steinar Giil, politician
- 30 January – Ola H. Metliaas, civil servant and politician (died 2005).
- 31 January – Ragnhild Nilstun, novelist, children's writer and literary critic.

=== February ===
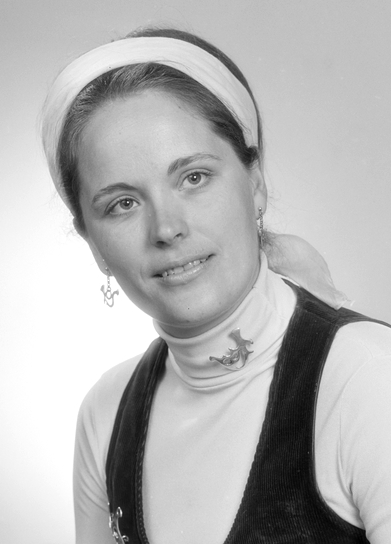
Babill Stray-Pedersen

- 4 February
  - Tom Amundsen, sport rower and physician (died 2017).
  - Hallvard Bakke, politician and Minister (died 2024).
- 5 February – Jostein Berntsen, politician (died 2024).
- 6 February
  - Asbjørn Kjønstad, professor of law (died 2015).
  - Unn Thorvaldsen, javelin thrower.
- 9 February – Terje Pedersen, javelin thrower
- 13 February – Håkon Aasnes, comics artist and writer.
- 18 February – Torstein Hagen, engineer and businessman.
- 20 February – Babill Stray-Pedersen, physician (died 2019).
- 22 February – Astrid Bjellebø Bayegan, theologian.
- 25 February – Liv Jagge-Christiansen, tennis player and alpine skier.
- 26 February – Roar Jens Haugen, army general (died 2025).

=== March ===
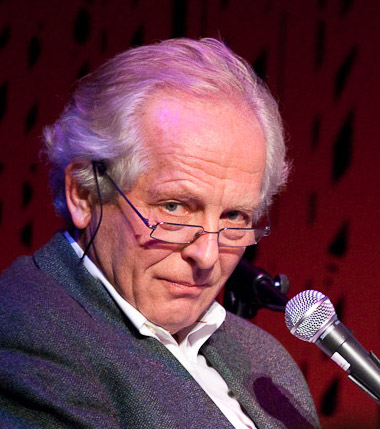
William Nygaard

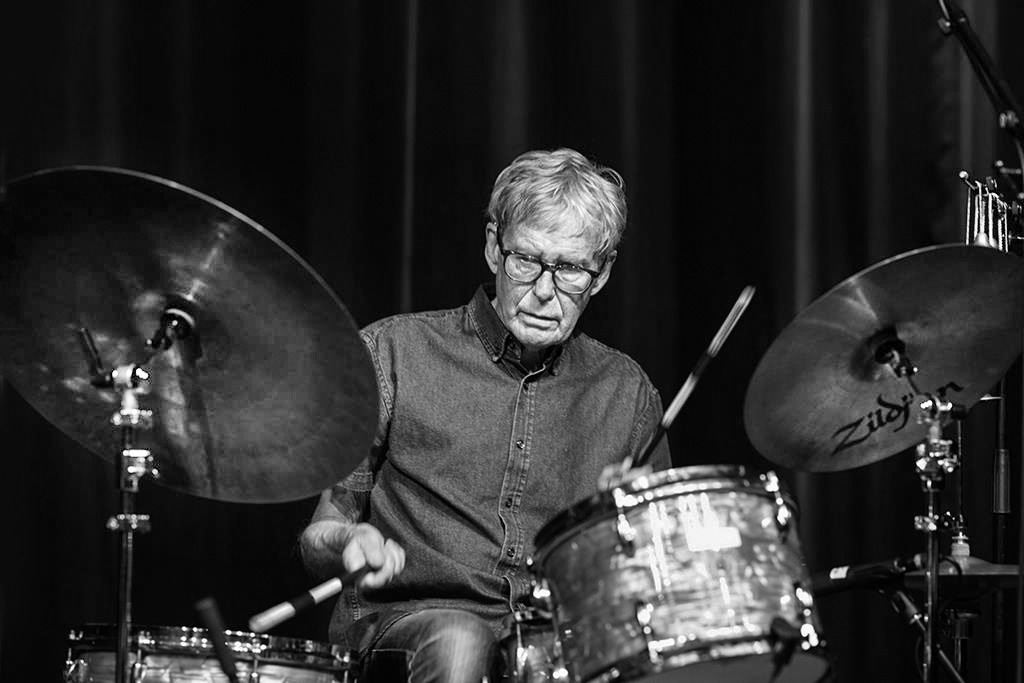
Jon Christensen

- 3 March
  - Jan Ragnar Hagland, philologist.
  - Trond Mohn, businessperson and philanthropist
- 5 March – Inger Stolt-Nielsen, schoolteacher and politician.
- 9 March – Sven Trygve Falck, engineer, businessperson and politician (died 2019).
- 10 March – Kine Aune, filmmaker (died 2025).
- 11 March – Rolf Groven, painter (died 2025).
- 12 March – Magnhild Holmberg, politician (died 2013).
- 13 March – Einar Lunde, journalist and news anchor.
- 14 March
  - Bjørn Odmar Andersen, footballer (died 2008)
  - Ole Daniel Enersen, climber, photographer, journalist, writer and medical historian
- 16 March – William Nygaard, publisher
- 17 March – Karl Helland, racing cyclist.
- 20 March
  - Gerd Kjellaug Berge, hotelier and organisational leader.
  - Jon Christensen, jazz percussionist (died 2020).
  - Unne Terjesen, model
- 27 March – Arne Vinje, chess player (died 2011).
- 29 March – Rigmor Aarø Spiten, politician.

=== April ===
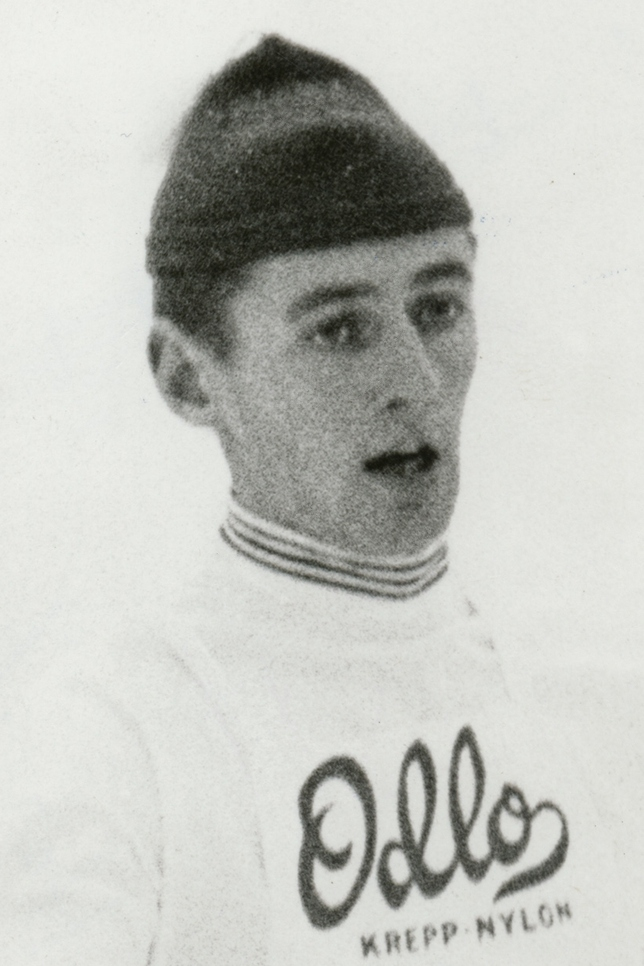
Johs Harviken

- 2 April – Gunnar Stavseth, journalist and politician
- 3 April – Trond Mohn, businessman and philanthropist.
- 6 April – Johs Harviken, cross country skier and Olympic silver medallist
- 8 April – Gunnar Breivik, sociologist
- 14 April – Britt Hildeng, politician (died 2022).
- 17 April
  - Erik Magnus Boe, legal scholar.
  - Peter Lorange, economist.
- 18 April – Carl Graff-Wang, handball player
- 18 April – Svein Hansen, ice hockey player (died 2012).
- 20 April – Per Søderstrøm, handball player
- 23 April
  - Jan Hårstad, actor.
  - Nils Sletta, actor (died 2020).
  - Knut Storbukås, singer and songwriter.
- 28 April
  - Karl Johan Johannessen, footballer.
  - Jan Levor Njargel, politician (died 2020).

=== May ===
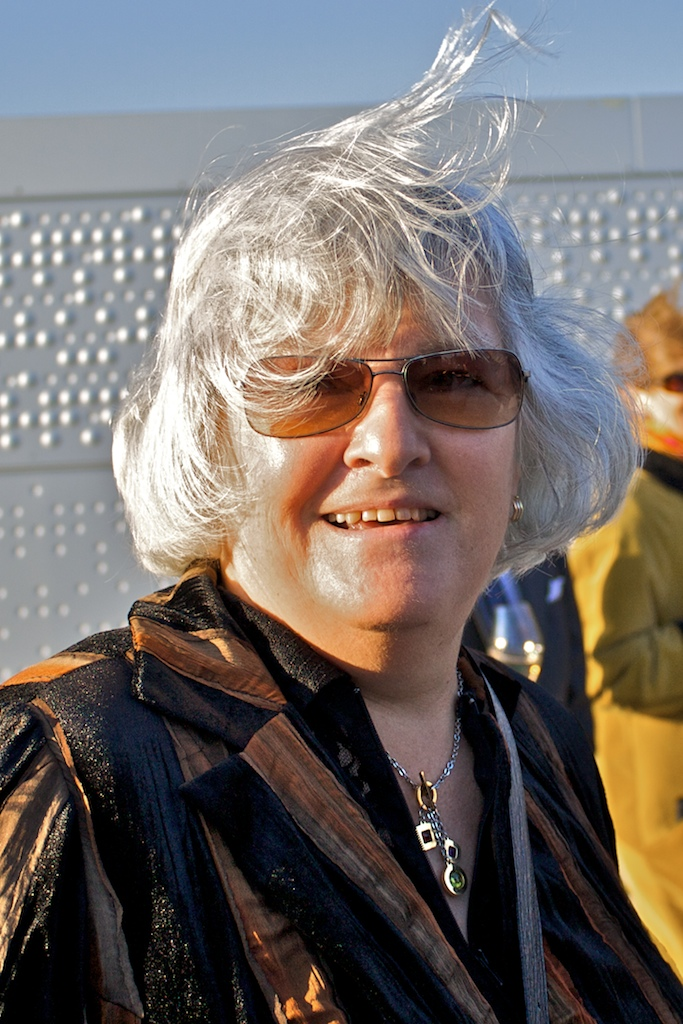
Nina Karin Monsen, moral philosopher

- 2 May – Arne Paus, visual artist and painter
- 3 May – Jan Terje Faarlund, linguist.
- 4 May – Reidar Åsgård, politician
- 8 May – Hans Raastad, economist, and former leader of the Workers' Youth League.
- 14 May – Johan Ludvik Løvald, diplomat
- 21 May – Lasse Sigurd Seim, diplomat (died 2024).
- 28 May – Arve Haugen, cyclist.
- 29 May – Nina Karin Monsen, moral philosopher and author
- 31 May – Aud Hvammen, alpine skier.

=== June ===
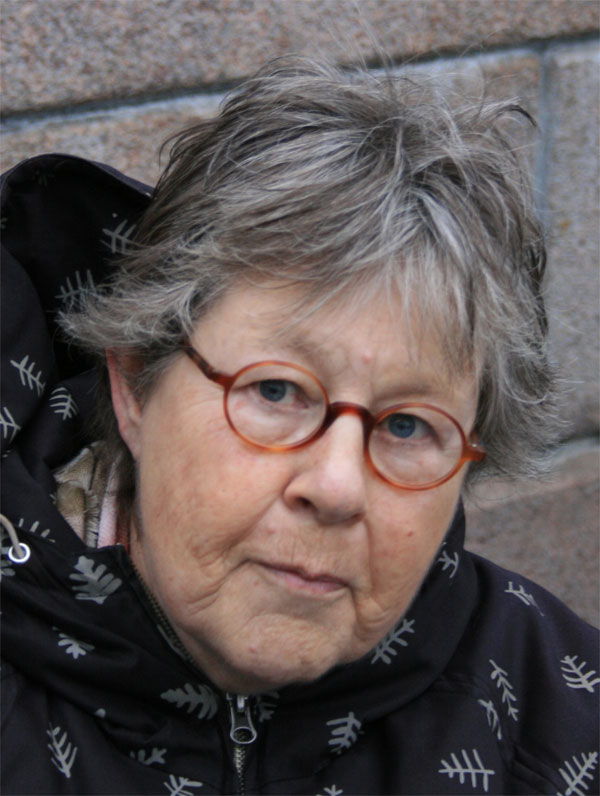
Wenche Blomberg

- 1 June – Egil Hestnes, politician
- 7 June – Jakob Margido Esp, actor (died 2023).
- 11 June – Øyvind Thorsen, journalist, writer (died 2025).
- 12 June – Thor Furulund, painter (died 2016).
- 22 June – Synnøve Tronsvang, politician
- 23 June – Wenche Blomberg, author (died 2023).
- 27 June – Kjersti Døvigen, actress (died 2021).
- 29 June
  - Jan Knutzen, documentary filmmaker.
  - Fred Robsahm, film actor (died 2015).

=== July ===
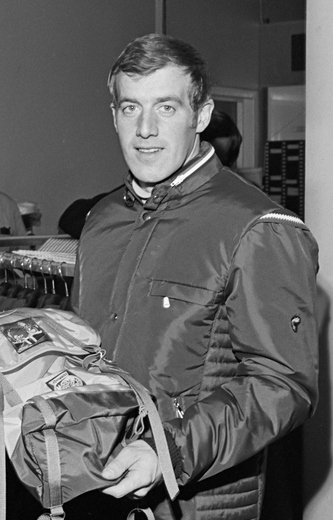
Magne Myrmo, cross country skier

- 2 July
  - Olav Hytta, businessperson.
  - Svein Bredo Østlien, footballer.
- 3 July – Svein Sundsbø, businessperson and politician
- 4 July – Mary Synnøve Kvidal, politician and Minister.
- 6 July
  - Jan Fridthjof Bernt, jurist.
  - Trond Nordby, historian and political scientist
- 10 July – Helge Kringstad, banker, civil servant and politician.
- 15 July – Frithjof Prydz, ski jumper and tennis player (died 1992).
- 17 July – Ola Solum, film director (died 1996).
- 19 July
  - Arvid Gjengedal, academic and politician
  - Otto Homlung, stage producer and theatre director (died 2025).
- 22 July – Nils Utsi, actor (died 2019).
- 24 July
  - Ola Bauer, novelist and playwright (died 1999).
  - Hennild Wollstadmo, politician
- 27 July – Einar Lutro, politician
- 30 July – Magne Myrmo, cross country skier, Olympic silver medallist and World Champion (died 2025).

=== August ===
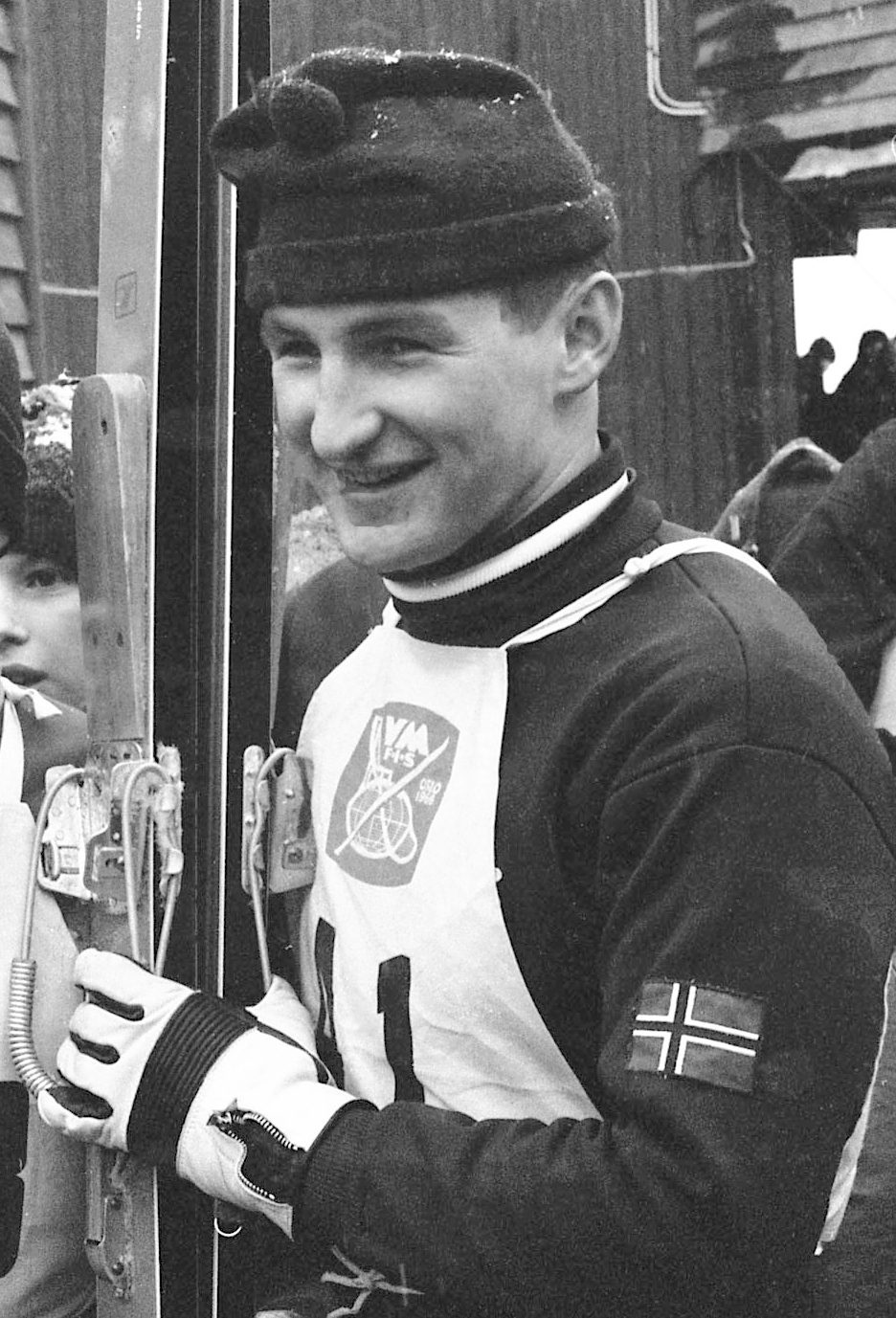
Bjørn Wirkola

- 4 August
  - Tom Martinsen, photographer (died 2007).
  - Bjørn Wirkola, ski jumper and World Champion, soccer player
- 6 August – Ivar Ueland, politician (died 2020).
- 7 August – Kleiv Fiskvik, trade unionist and politician.
- 13 August
  - Inge Grødum, illustrator.
  - Dagfinn Hjertenes, politician (died 2006)
- 16 August – Arnulf Bæk, handball player
- 17 August – Kjersti Scheen, illustrator and writer. (died 2026)
- 18 August – John H. Larsen Jr., sports shooter.
- 20 August – Peter Nicolay Ræder, diplomat.
- 21 August – Herman Friele, businessman and politician.
- 25 August – Ståle Eskeland, jurist (died 2015).
- 27 August – Helge Rykkja, author, poet, teacher and politician (died 2020).
- 28 August – Anne-Lise Berntsen, soprano (died 2012).
- 29 August – Lars Sigmundstad, politician

=== September ===
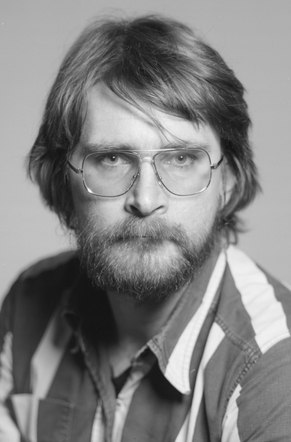
Helge Rønning

- 1 September
  - Kirsti Kolle Grøndahl, politician.
  - Helge Rønning, literary scholar.
- 3 September
  - Jan S. Levy, civil servant and politician.
  - Jorunn Ringstad, politician
- 10 September – Tor Edvin Dahl, novelist, crime fiction writer, playwright, children's writer, non-fiction writer, translator, literary critic and journalist.
- 13 September – Anna Elisabeth Ljunggren, physiotherapist, (died 2010).
- 16 September – Einar Niemi, historian.
- 20 September – Arne Halaas, professor in computer technology and telematics.
- 25 September – Knut Eggum Johansen, civil servant
- 30 September – Thore Langfeldt, psychologist and sexologist

=== October ===
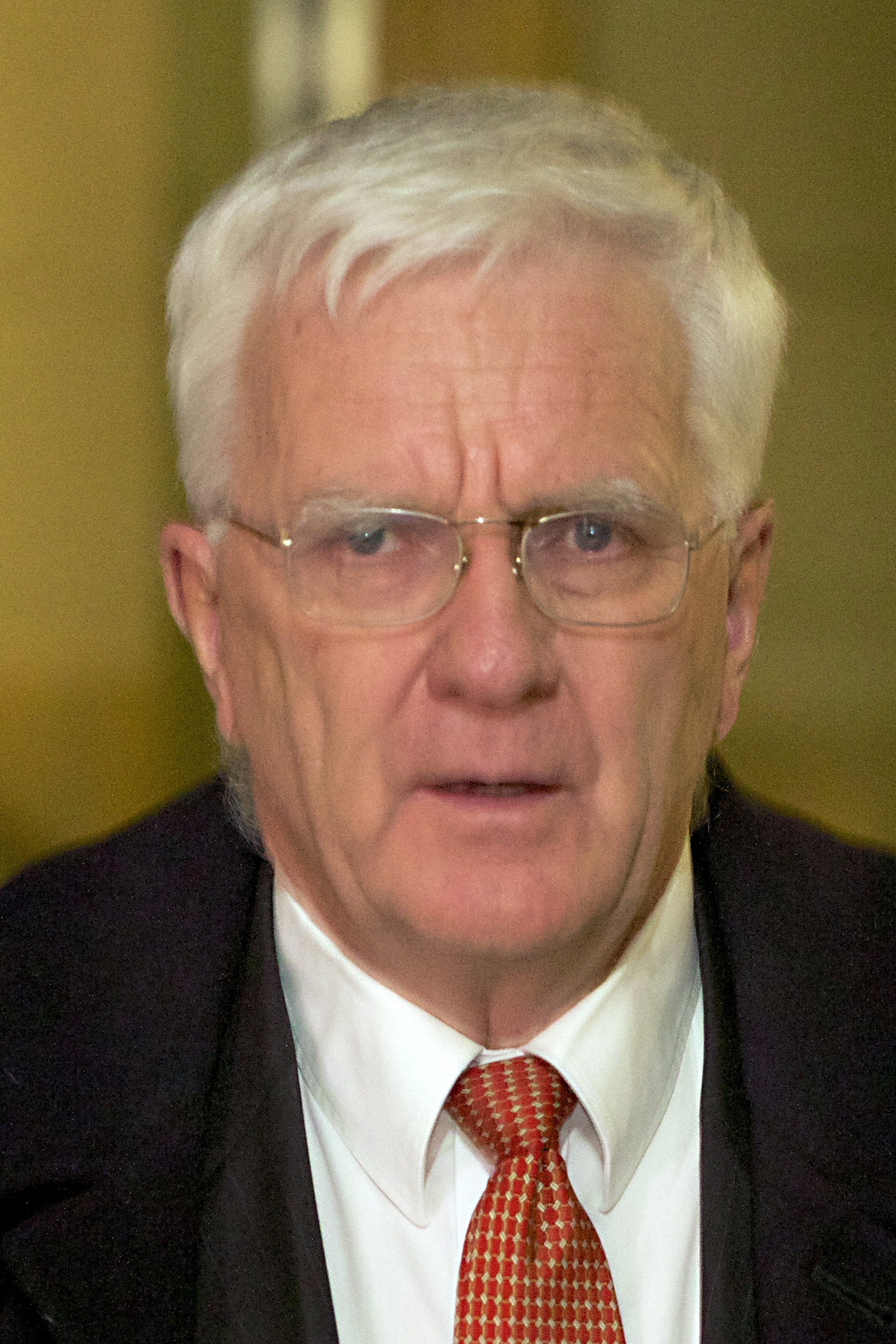
Trygve Hegnar, publisher and editor of Kapital and Finansavisen

- 3 October – Arne Bjørlykke, geologist
- 6 October – Bjøro Håland, country singer
- 6 October – Trygve Hegnar, investor, publisher and editor.
- 6 October – Sverre Mauritzen, diplomat and politician.
- 12 October – Odd Einar Dørum, politician and Minister.
- 15 October – Bjarne Hodne, folklorist.
- 16 October – Terje Moe, painter (died 2004).
- 19 October – Amund Venger, politician (died 2013).
- 25 October – Wenche Krossøy, children's writer (died 2010).
- 26 October
  - Ståle Dyrvik, historian
  - Svein Mønnesland, linguist.
- 27 October – Torstein Hansen, handball player (died 2018).
- 31 October – Thorleif Enger, businessperson.

=== November ===
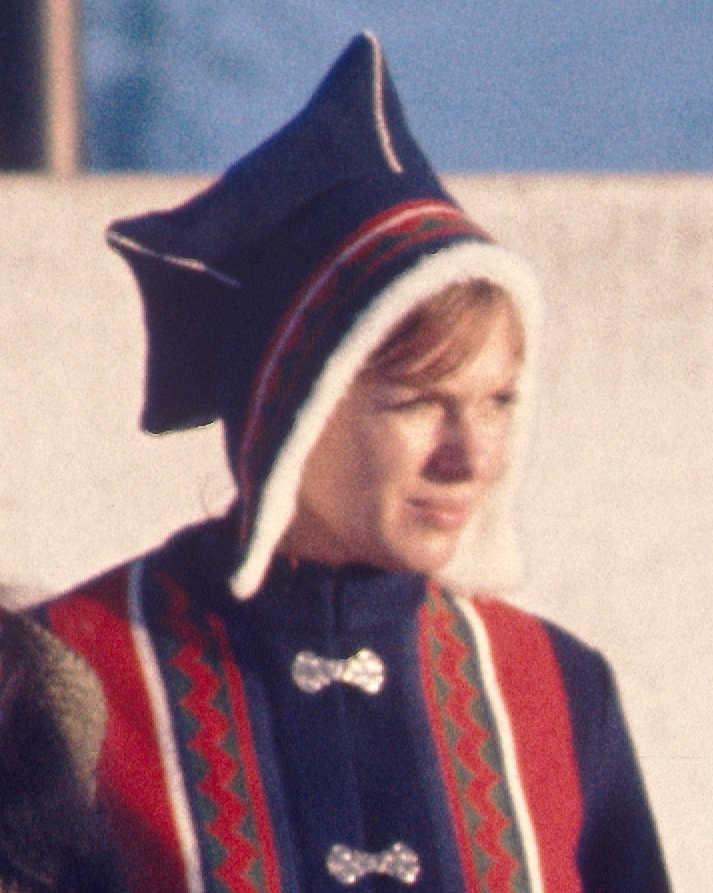
Julie Ege

- 5 November – Kjell Magne Yri, priest, linguist and translator
- 7 November – Dikke Eger-Bergman, alpine skier.
- 12 November
  - Julie Ege, actress and model (died 2008)
  - Thorgeir Stubø, jazz guitarist and composer (died 1986)
- 22 November – Torill Thorstad Hauger, novelist, children's writer and non-fiction writer (died 2014).
- 25 November – Kjeld Rimberg, engineer and business executive.
- 28 November – Hans Svelland, politician.

=== December ===
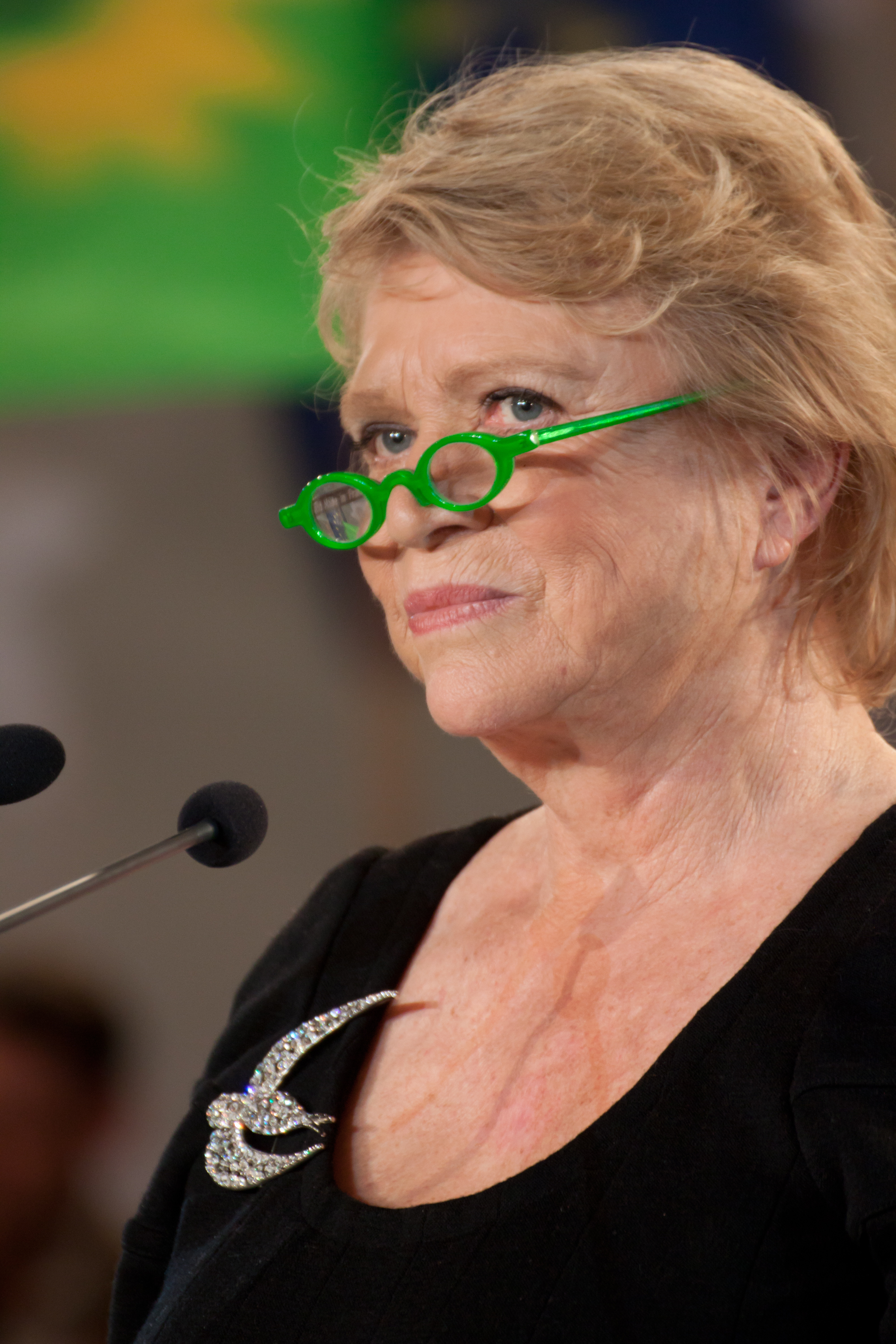
Eva Joly, magistrate in France

- 1 December – Finn E. Kydland, economist
- 3 December – Bjørn Boysen, organist and educator (died 2018).
- 3 December – Ingmar Ljones, politician
- 4 December – Knut Haavik, journalist and magazine editor (died 2019).
- 5 December
  - Ellen Francke, poet, novelist, playwright (died 1990).
  - Kåre Østensen, ice hockey player.
  - Eva Joly, magistrate in France
- 6 December – Mette Ravn, diplomat
- 7 December – Per Fugelli, professor of medicine (died 2017).
- 12 December – Tore Bjørnsen, weightlifter.
- 14 December – Kari Oftedal Lima, politician
- 15 December – Håvard Holm, civil servant (died 2017).
- 17 December – Thorbjørn Lie, businessperson and politician (died 2006)
- 20 December – Svein Longva, economist and civil servant (died 2009)
- 29 December – Arne Øren, politician
- 29 December – Helge Pharo, historian

=== Full date unknown ===
- Gisle Handeland, politician
- Eldbjørg Løwer, politician
- Kari Fasting, sociologist and rector

Y

== Notable deaths ==
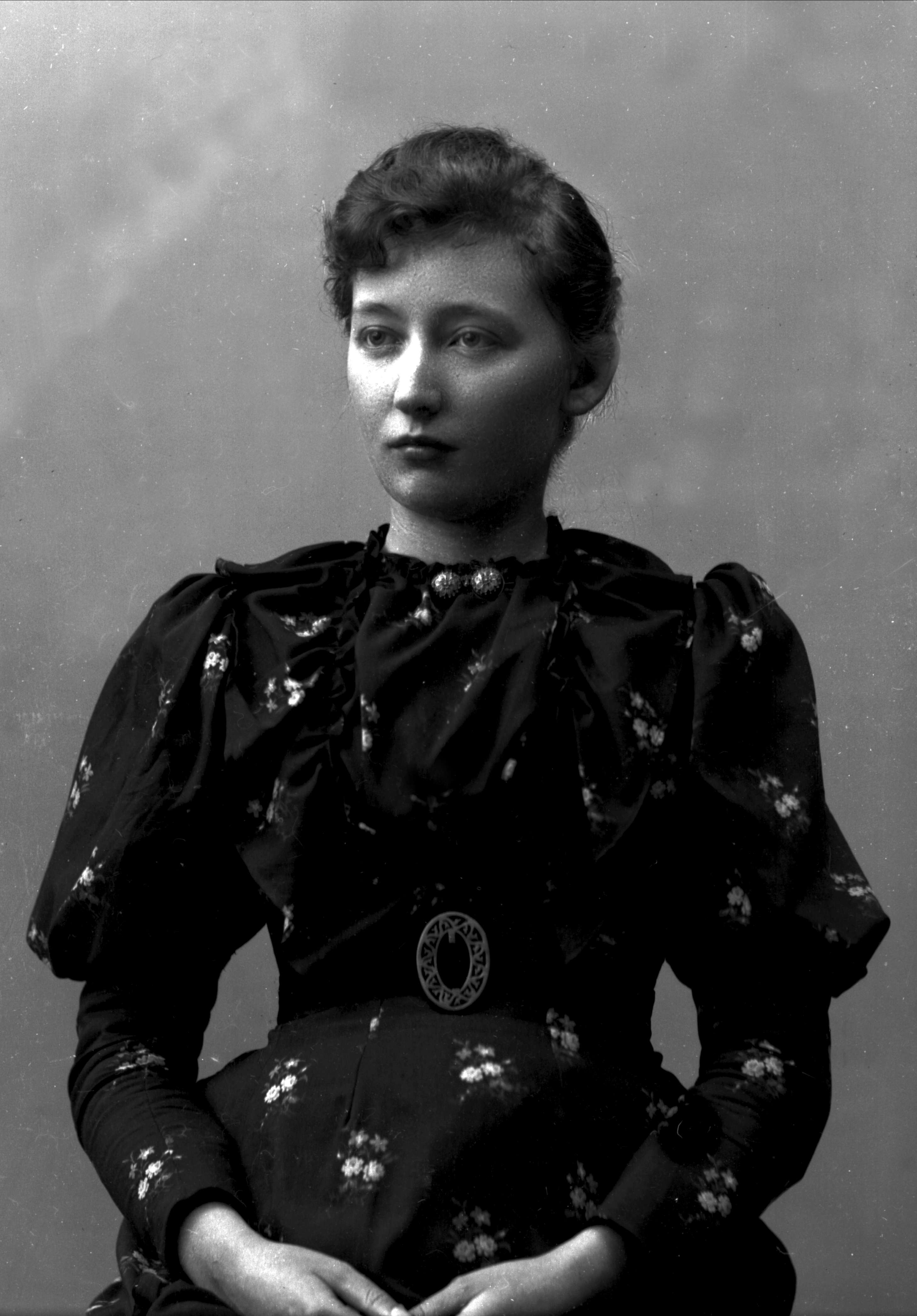
Hanna Resvoll-Holmsen, botanist and pioneer in Norwegian natural history education and nature conservation

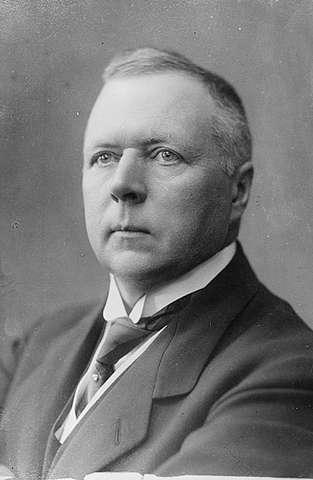
Johan Ludwig Mowinckel, three times Prime Minister

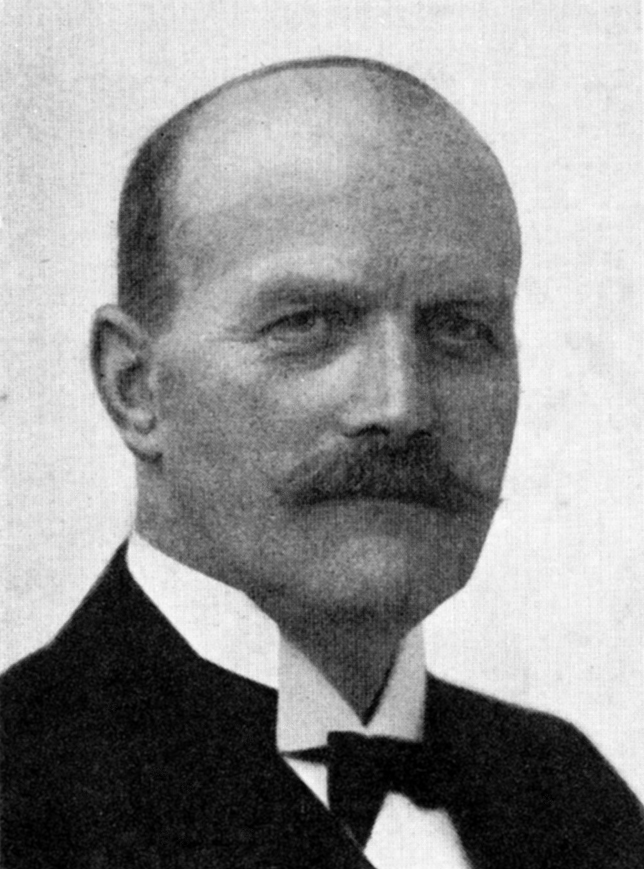
Harald Halvorsen, politician for the Labour Party, representative to the Storting for six periods

=== January ===
- 9 January – Anathon Aall, academic (born 1867)
- 18 January – Urban Jacob Rasmus Børresen, rear admiral (born 1857)

=== February ===
- 10 February – Sverre Granlund, commando (born 1918)
- 28 February – Leonhard Hess Stejneger, zoologist (born 1851)

=== March ===
- 1 March – Odd Starheim, resistance fighter and SOE agent (born 1916).
- 12 March – Gustav Vigeland, sculptor (born 1869)
- 13 March – Hanna Resvoll-Holmsen, botanist (born 1873)

=== May ===
- 1 May – Johan Oscar Smith, Christian leader, founder of the Brunstad Christian Church (born 1871)
- 2 May – Nils Gregoriussen Skilbred, politician (born 1860)
- 19 May – Peder Morset, teacher and resistance member (born 1887).

=== July ===
- 14 July – Carl Johan Ege (1852–1943), Norwegian banker

=== September ===
- 1 September – Karl Aas, gymnast and Olympic silver medallist (born 1899)
- 30 September – Johan Ludwig Mowinckel, politician and three-times Prime Minister of Norway (born 1870)

=== October ===
- 17 October – Arthur Olsen II, boxer (born 1907)

=== November ===
- 25 November – Einar Høigård, educator (born 1907).
- 26 November – Anders Hovden, hymnwriter, priest, author and popular speaker (born 1860)

=== December ===
- 2 December – Nordahl Grieg, poet, novelist, dramatist, and journalist (born 1902)
- 7 December – Per Imerslund, politician, soldier and writer (born 1912)
- 9 December – Harald Halvorsen, politician (born 1877).
- 10 December – Olaf Sletten, shooter and Olympic silver medallist (born 1886)
- 16 December – Frederik Macody Lund, historian (born 1863)

=== Full date unknown ===
- Axel Aubert, businessperson (born 1873)
- Ole Ludvig Bærøe, politician (born 1877)
- Ingolf Elster Christensen, politician (born 1872)
- Jens Holmboe, botanist (born 1880)
- Herman Jeremiassen, ship-owner and politician (born 1851)
- Karsten Konow, sailor and Olympic silver medallist (born 1918)
- Olav Scheflo, politician and journalist (born 1883)
- Arvid Storsveen, intelligence officer (born 1915)
