= Bakken (surname) =

Bakken is a surname of Norwegian origin.

== People with the surname Bakken ==
- Alf Bakken (born 1962), Norwegian politician for the Progress Party
- Atle Bakken, Norwegian composer
- Anne-Lise Bakken (born 1952), Norwegian politician
- Brenda Bakken-Lackey, former Canadian provincial politician
- Christopher Bakken, American poet and professor
- Earl Bakken (1924–2018), American engineer, businessman and philanthropist
- Inger Marie Bakken (born 1951), Norwegian politician for the Socialist Left Party.
- Ingvar Bakken (1920–1982), Norwegian politician
- Janae Bakken, American television producer and screenwriter
- Jill Bakken (born 1977), American bobsledder
- Jim Bakken (born 1940), American football player
- Jon Bakken (born 1943), Norwegian politician for the Socialist Left Party
- Marius Bakken (born 1978), Norwegian runner
- Per Bakken (1882–1958), Norwegian Nordic skier
- Sivert Guttorm Bakken (1998–2025), Norwegian biathlete
- Terje Bakken (1978–2004), Norwegian singer
- Timo André Bakken (born 1989), Norwegian cross-country skier

== See also ==
- Bakken (disambiguation)
