= Ege =

Ege or EGE may refer to:

== People ==
- Ege (given name), list of people with the given name
- Ege (surname), list of people with the surname

== Education ==
- Unified State Exam (Russian: Единый государственный экзамен, ЕГЭ), a series of secondary education examinations in Russia
- École de guerre économique, French academic institution
- Ege University, in İzmir, Turkey

== Places and transportation ==
- Ege, Indiana, an unincorporated community
- Mount Ege, in Antarctica
- EGE, the IATA code of Eagle County Regional Airport, in Colorado
- TCG Ege (F-256), a Turkish frigate
