= T. S. Eliot Prize (Truman State University) =

Annual award for the best unpublished book-length collection of poetry in English

The T. S. Eliot Prize for Poetry is awarded annually by Truman State University, which is a United States university located in Missouri. First awarded in 1997, the prize is given "for the best unpublished book-length collection of poetry in English, in honor of native Missourian T. S. Eliot's considerable intellectual and artistic legacy". The prize includes publication of the collection as well as a purse of $2000. Poets submit their unpublished collections to Truman State University Press for each year's competition.

== List of winners ==
The winners, collection titles, and judges of the annual Prize are listed below.

Year	Poet	Collection	Judge
2016	Alison D. Moncrief Bromage	Daughter, Daedalus	Jennifer Clement
2015	Laura Bylenok	Warp	Arthur Sze
2014	Ilyse Kusnetz	Small Hours	Dorianne Laux
2013	Luc Phinney	Compass	Sherod Santos
2012	David Livewell	Shackamaxon	Sandra McPherson
2011	B. K. Fisher	Mutiny Gallery	Tony Barnstone
2010	Dean Rader	Works and Days	Claudia Keelan
2009	David Moolten	Primitive Mood	Virgil Suárez
2008	Victoria Brockmeier	my maiden cowboy names	Grace Schulman
2007	Carol V. Davis	Into the Arms of Pushkin: Poems of St. Petersburg	Alberto Ríos
2006	Rebecca Dunham	The Miniature Room	Naomi Shihab Nye
2005	Mona Lisa Saloy	Red Beans and Ricely Yours	Ishmael Reed
2004	Michael Sowder	The Empty Boat	Diane Wakoski
2003	Barbara Campbell	Erotic Distance	Carolyn D. Wright
2002	James Gurley	Human Cartography	David Wagoner
2001	Christopher Bakken	After Greece	Lynne McMahon
2000	H. L. Hix	Rational Numbers	Dana Gioia
1999	David Keplinger	The Rose Inside	Mary Oliver
1998	Rhina Espaillat	Where Horizons Go	X. J. Kennedy
1997	William Baer	The Unfortunates	Samuel Maio
