= Gjengedal =

Gjengedal is a surname. Notable people with the surname include:

- Anstein Gjengedal (born 1944), Norwegian police chief
- Arvid Gjengedal (1943–2021), Norwegian educationalist and politician
- Knut Gjengedal (1900–1973), Norwegian schoolteacher and writer
- Ola Johan Gjengedal (1900–1992), Norwegian politician
