= Terje Moe =

Terje Moe may refer to:

- Terje Moe (architect) (1930–2009), Norwegian architect
- Terje Moe (painter) (1943–2004), Norwegian painter
- Terje Moe Gustavsen (born 1954), Norwegian politician
