= Turid Hundstad =

Norwegian civil servant

Turid Hundstad (born 1945) is a Norwegian civil servant.

Having graduated with the siv.øk. degree from Norwegian School of Economics and Business Administration, she embarked on a career as a civil servant. She first worked in the Ministry of Finance, then as a sub-director and deputy under-secretary of state in the Ministry of Culture. For some time she was also deputy director in the International Maritime Organization. She was appointed director of the Norwegian State Educational Loan Fund in 1994, leaving in 2004. After this she has been chairman of the board of the Norwegian Film Fund and a deputy member of the board of the Government Pension Fund - Norway. She was a part of the group that delivered the Norwegian Official Report 2008: 7, Kulturmomsutvalget.

Civic offices
| Preceded by Jan S. Levy | Director of the Norwegian State Educational Loan Fund; 1994–2004 | Succeeded by Bertil Tiusanen |
