= TCG Ege =

TCG Ege is the name of the following ships of the Turkish Navy:

- TCG Ege (F 256), ex-USS Ainsworth, a Knox-class frigate acquired in 1994, decommissioned in 2005, now a museum ship in Izmir, Turkey
- TCG Ege (F 521), a planned Istanbul-class frigate

== See also ==
- Ege (disambiguation)
