= Dean Rader =

American writer and professor

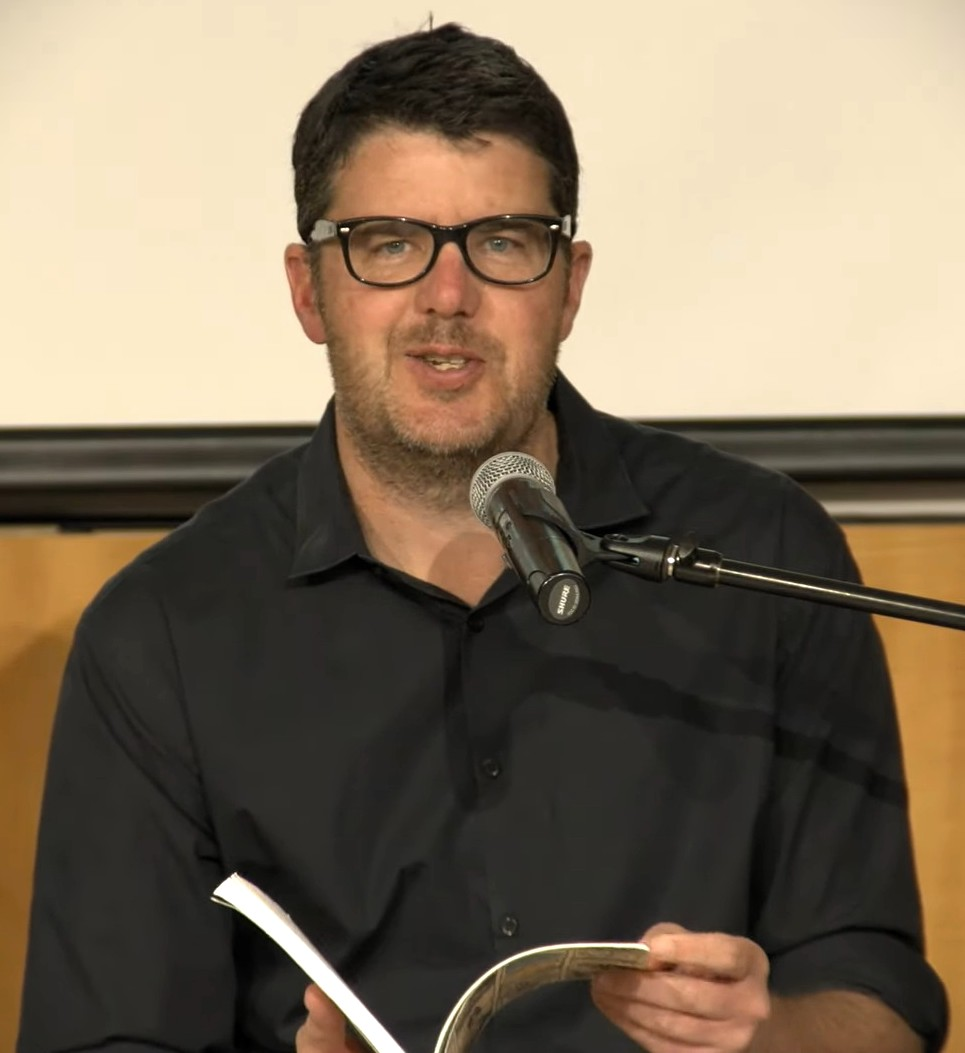
Rader recites at the San Francisco Public Library in 2014

Dean Rader is an American writer and professor who teaches at the University of San Francisco, in the Department of English, where he has also served as department chair. Rader holds M.A. and Ph.D. in comparative literature from the State University of New York at Binghamton where he studied translation, poetry, visual culture, and literary studies. He is primarily known for his poems that mix high and low art and his scholarly work on Native American poetry.

"Self Portrait as Wikipedia Entry" was published in 2017 by Copper Canyon Press, and the title poem also posted on ZYZZYVA on February 6, 2012. The book was a finalist for the Oklahoma Book Award and the Northern California Book Award and received positive reviews from The San Francisco Chronicle, Publishers Weekly, Booklist, and The Rumpus.

Rader published two other books in 2017, including a collection of poems co-written with Simone Muench, entitled Suture (Black Lawrence Press), also known as the "Frankenstein Sonnets." He also edited Bullets into Bells: Poets & Citizens Respond to Gun Violence (with Brian Clements & Alexandra Teague), which was published by Beacon Press. This book contains 50 poems by American poets, and each poem is paired with a response by a survivor of a shooting, a community activist, or a leader in the gun violence prevention movement. Widely praised, Bullets into Bells was recognized by The New York Times, The Washington Post, PBS, Poets & Writers, Rain Taxi, and other publications.

== Literary work ==
In addition to his teaching, Rader is a published reviewer, a scholar of film and art, and an award-winning poet. His poem "Hesiod in Oklahoma, 1934" won the Sow's Ear Review poetry prize in 2009, judged by Kelly Cherry. Rader's debut poetry collection, Works and Days, won the 2010 T. S. Eliot Prize (Truman State University), judged by Claudia Keelan. Works & Days was also named a finalist for the Bob Bush Memorial First Book Award, and it won the Writer's League of Texas Book Award for Poetry.

Rader's 2014 collection, Landscape Portrait Figure Form (Omnidawn 2014), a book that explores the connection between poetry and painting, was named by the Barnes & Noble Review as one of the year's Best Books of Poems. He was also the recipient of the George Bogin Memorial Award from the Poetry Society of America. Harvard poet and critic Stephen Burt selected a folio of Rader's poems entitled "American Self-Portrait" for the 2015 award.

In 2011, Rader wrote a series of columns for the San Francisco Chronicle on The 10 Greatest Poets, which received media coverage in The New York Times.

That same year, Rader began a blog called 99 Poems for the 99 Percent, which posted 99 poems over 99 days. The blog featured poems by well-known writers like LeAnne Howe, Matthew Zapruder, Robert Pinsky, Martha Collins, Heid E. Erdrich, Edward Hirsch, Timothy Donnelly, Maxine Chernoff, Camille Dungy, and Bob Hicok as well as beginning and non-professional poets. In 2014, 99 Poems for the 99 Percent: An Anthology of Poetry, was published in book form. In August, it debuted at number two on the Small Press Distribution Poetry Bestseller List and in September, it took over the number one spot.

Rader is reported to be at work on an anthology of Native American Poetry and is writing a book of poems about the painter Cy Twombly.

== Other awards and fellowships ==
- Fellowships at Harvard University and Princeton University
- Guggenheim Fellowship, 2019
- Appearance in The Best American Poetry and Best of the Net
- Poetry prizes from The Poetry Society of America, Crab Orchard Review, Common Ground Review, 2007
- National Endowment for the Humanities Chair at the University of San Francisco, 2009–2010.
- Editor, Studies in American Indian Literature

== Works ==
=== Poetry collections ===
- Works & Days (Truman State University Press, 2010)
- Landscape Portrait Figure Form (Omnidawn, 2014)
- Self-Portrait as Wikipedia Entry (Copper Canyon Press, 2017)
- Suture (Black Lawrence Press, 2017)
- Before the Borderless: Dialogues with the Art of Cy Twombly (2023)

=== Anthology appearances ===
- Bullets into Bells: Poets & Citizens Respond to Gun Violence (Beacon Press, 2017)

=== As editor ===
- Rader, Dean; Gould, Janice, eds. (2003). Speak to me words: essays on contemporary American Indian poetry. Tucson: University of Arizona Press. ISBN 9780816523481.
- Rader, Dean; Silverman, Jonathan, eds. (2008). The world is a text: writing, reading and thinking about visual and popular culture (3rd ed.). Upper Saddle River, New Jersey: Pearson/Prentice Hall. ISBN 9780136033455.
- Rader, Dean (2011). Engaged resistance: American Indian art, literature, and film from Alcatraz to the NMAI. The William and Bettye Nowlin series in art, history, and culture of the Western Hemisphere (1st ed.). Austin, Texas: University of Texas Press. ISBN 9780292723993.
- 99 Poems for the 99 Percent: An Anthology of Poetry (99: The Press, 2014)

=== Online ===
- "Frost on Fire" in THE NEW YORK TIMES, poem
- "Sphere of Influence or Praise Song for the Warriors", a poem commissioned by THE SAN FRANCISCO CHRONICLE
- "America We Do Not Call Your Name Without Hope" in THE SAN FRANCISCO CHRONICLE, poem
- "History", poem in The Kenyon Review
- 99 Poems for the 99 Percent, blog
- "Self Portrait as Wikipedia Entry". ZYZZYVA. 2012-02-06.
