= Jan S. Levy =

Norwegian politician (born 1943)

Jan Schreiner Levy (born 3 September 1943) is a Norwegian civil servant and politician for the Conservative Party.

He started his career as a journalist at Østlandsposten. He then worked for the Conservative Party between 1966 and 1981, including positions as secretary and editor of the party newspaper. From 1981 to 1986, in the first and second cabinet Willoch, Levy was appointed state secretary in the Ministry of Church and Education and the Ministry of Culture and Science.

When the second cabinet, Willoch fell in May 1986, Levy was hired as an advisor in the Ministry of Culture. In October of the same year, he was appointed director of the Norwegian State Educational Loan Fund. He served until 1993, and was then appointed deputy under-secretary of State in the Ministry of Education. He has been a member of the Directorate for Education in the OECD and the higher education group in the Nordic Council of Ministers. He was involved in the Bologna process.

Civic offices
Preceded by Ulf Oscar Sand	Director of the Norwegian State Educational Loan Fund; 1986–1993	Succeeded by Turid Hundstad
