= Ege (surname) =

Ege is a Turkish and Norwegian surname. In Turkish it refers to those from the Aegean region.

Notable people with the name include:

== People ==
- Andrew Ege (1812–1876), American lawyer, farmer and politician
- Carl Johan Ege (1852–1943), Norwegian banker
- Cody Ege (born 1991), American former professional baseball pitcher
- Didem Ege (born 1988), Turkish volleyball player
- Ece Ege (born 1963), Turkish-French fashion designer and founder of the prêt-à-porter line DICE KAYEK
- George Ege (1748–1829), politician from Philadelphia
- Hettie Belle Ege (1861–1942), American mathematician
- İbrahim Ege (born 1983), Turkish retired football player
- Julie Ege (1943–2008), Norwegian actress and model
- Otto Ege (1888–1951), American educator
- Steinar Ege (born 1972), retired Norwegian handballer

== See also ==
- Ege (given name)
