= Bakken =

Bakken may refer to:

== People ==
- Bakken (surname), list of people with this name

== Places ==
- Bakken, Agder, a village in Iveland municipality, Agder county, Norway
- The Bakken, a medical electricity museum in Minneapolis, Minnesota, US
- Dyrehavsbakken, a Danish amusement park referred to informally as Bakken
- Bakken formation, a rock unit with producible reserves of oil in North America
- Bakken pipeline, an oil pipeline in the US

== Other ==
- Bakken Air, an airline based in Bismarck, North Dakota
- Bakken Bears, a Danish professional basketball club
