= Mona Lisa Saloy =

American poet and folklorist

- Born: Mona Lisa Saloy; New Orleans, Louisiana, U.S.
- Education: University of Washington (BA); San Francisco State University (MA); Louisiana State University (PhD, MFA)
- Occupations: Professor, author, storyteller
- Website: http://www.monalisasaloy.com/

Mona Lisa Saloy is an American poet and folklorist. She is the Poet Laureate of Louisiana since 2021.

== Biography ==
Dr. Mona Lisa Saloy was born in New Orleans and got her education in the University of Washington, where she graduated in 1979 with a BA in English. She then went to San Francisco State University and left with her MA in creative writing and English in 1982. She then went to Louisiana State University, which she left with a PhD in English and MFA in creative writing in 2005 and 1988. Saloy is the Conrad N. Hilton Endowed Professor of English at Dillard University.

Saloy's poetry appears in a number of publications, including Louisiana Folklore Miscellany, The Southern Poetry Anthology and the Children's Folklore Review. Her book Red Beans & Ricely Yours won the 2005 T. S. Eliot Prize (Truman State University) and the PEN/Oakland Josephine Miles Prize in 2006. Saloy is known for writing about New Orleans Creole cultural experience. She has been awarded a number of honours, including the Mayor's Office Tricentennial Grant in 2018.

== Works ==
- Red Beans & Ricely Yours: Poems (Truman State University Press, 2015)
- Second Line Home, New Orleans Poems (Truman State University Press)
- Black Creole Chronicles (University of New Orleans Press, 2023)
