= Rebecca Dunham =

American poet

Rebecca Dunham is a contemporary American poet. Her work has been described as post-confessional and concerns itself with feminist and ecological issues. Dunham's lyric poetry is distinguished by its use of extended poetic sequences, its interrogation of the persona as artifice, as well as grounding itself frequently in accounts of women's lives.

== Background ==
Originally from Maine, Dunham resides in Madison, Wisconsin. She is currently a professor of English at the University of Wisconsin-Milwaukee. Her poetry has been featured in AGNI, Prairie Schooner, Indiana Review, The Antioch Review, Kenyon Review, and FIELD.

== Awards and honors ==
- Arts and Letters Distinguished Visiting Writing, Bowling Green State University, Spring 2014
- Lindquist & Vennum Poetry Prize, 2013
- National Endowment for the Arts Fellowship in Poetry, 2007
- T. S. Eliot Prize (Truman State University) for The Miniature Room, 2006.
- Jay C. and Ruth Halls Fellow in Poetry, University of Wisconsin–Madison, 2005–2006
- Indiana Review Poetry Prize, 2005

== Books ==
- Cold Pastoral (Milkweed Editions, 2017)
- Glass Armonica (Milkweed Editions, 2013)
- Fascicle (Dancing Girl Press, 2012)
- The Flight Cage (Tupelo Press, 2010)
- The Miniature Room (Truman State University Press, 2006)
