= Ege (given name) =

Unisex given name of Turkish origin

- Gender: Unisex

Origin
- Origin: Turkish
- Meaning: Aegean
- Region of origin: Turkey

Ege is a unisex, more commonly masculine, Turkish given name. Notable people with the name are as follows:

== Male ==
- Ahmet Ege Gürleyen (born 1999), German football player
- Ege Araç (born 2007), Turkish football player
- Ege Arar (born 1996), Turkish basketball player
- Ege Aydan (born 1958), Turkish actor
- Ege Bagatur (1937–1990), Turkish politician
- Ege Bezirganoğlu (born 2012), Turkish person
- Ege Bilsel (born 2004), Turkish football player
- Ege Çubukçu (born 1983), Turkish rapper and songwriter
- Ege Olusegun Adebisi (born 1983), Nigerian politician
- Ege Özkayımoğlu (born 2001), Turkish football player
- Ege Tan Yıldızoğlu (born 2004), Turkish basketball player
- İsmail Ege Şaşmaz (born 1993), Turkish actor
- Ömer Ege Ziyaettin (born 2008), basketball player

== Female ==
- Ege Kökenli (born 1993), Turkish actress
- Ege Melisa Bükmen (born 2004), Turkish volleyballer

== See also ==
- Ege (surname)
