= Inger Marie Bakken =

Norwegian politician (born 1951)

Inger Marie Bakken (born 3 June 1951) is a Norwegian politician for the Socialist Left Party.

She served as a deputy representative to the Norwegian Parliament from Sør-Trøndelag during the term 1981–1985.

She is a former member of the board of the Norwegian State Educational Loan Fund.
