= Helge Pharo =

Norwegian historian

Helge Pharo (born 29 December 1943) is a Norwegian historian.

== Background ==
He graduated from the University of Oslo with a cand.philol. degree in 1970. From 1972 he was a research assistant at the University of Oslo, and after a tenure as researcher at the Norwegian Institute of International Affairs 1974–1978 he moved back to the university to become an associate professor (førsteamanuensis). He finally became a professor in 1989, having taken the dr.philos. degree in 1988. He has been a visiting scholar at numerous institutions, such as the University of Wisconsin, Madison and the London School of Economics. He was the Norwegian editor of the Scandinavian Journal of History from 1984 to 1990, and editor-in-chief from 1990 to 1996. In addition he is a consultant for the Norwegian Nobel Committee.

He is a member of the Norwegian Academy of Science and Letters.

In his younger days, Pharo was an active middle distance runner. He became Norwegian 800 metres champion in 1964, and took his last championship medal (a bronze medal) in 1973. His personal best time was 1:48.8 minutes, achieved in August 1968 on Bislett stadion.
