= Kari Fasting =

Norwegian sociologist

Kari Fasting (born 1943) is a Norwegian sport sociologist. She was the first female rector of the Norwegian School of Sport Sciences.

Fasting worked at the Norwegian School of Sport Sciences from 1972 until 2013, when she became a professor emerita. She became Norway's first female professor of sport when appointed as such in 1987. From 1989 to 1994 she served as the School of Sport Sciences' rector. Among her main fields of research have been equality and sexual harassment in sport.

Fasting served as vice president of the International Sociology of Sport Association from 1990 to 1992 and president from 1992 to 1996, as well as sitting on the editorial board of its journal International Review for Sociology of Sport. In 2011 she received honorary membership of the International Sociology of Sport Association. She was later president of Women Sport International from 2003 to 2010.

Fasting also received honorary degrees at the University of Bern, University of Chichester and Malmö University. In 2023, she was decorated as a Knight, First Class of the Order of St. Olav. She resides at Fossum, Bærum.
