= Jan Levor Njargel =

Norwegian politician (1943–2020)

Jan Levor Njargel (28 April 1943 – 16 March 2020) was a Norwegian politician for the Progress Party.

He served as a deputy representative to the Parliament of Norway from Oppland during the term 1989–1993. In total he met during 23 days of parliamentary session. At the time he resided in Søndre Land Municipality.
