= Finansavisen =

Norwegian business newspaper

- Type: Business newspaper
- Founder: Trygve Hegnar
- Editor-in-chief: Trygve Hegnar
- Founded: 1 October 1992; 33 years ago
- Language: Norwegian
- Headquarters: Oslo
- Circulation: 24,742 (2013)
- Website: finansavisen.no

Finansavisen is a Norwegian business newspaper published by Hegnar Media in Oslo, Norway.

== History and profile ==
Finansavisen was first published on 1 October 1992 by Trygve Hegnar, who is also editor-in-chief. The paper has its headquarters in Oslo. It has also an associated online edition. It has a right-wing and neoliberal political stance.

The 1997 circulation of Finansavisen was 11,477 copies. The paper had a circulation of 23,274 copies in 2006. In 2013 the circulation of the paper was 24,742 copies.
