= Babill Stray-Pedersen =

Norwegian physician (1943–2019)

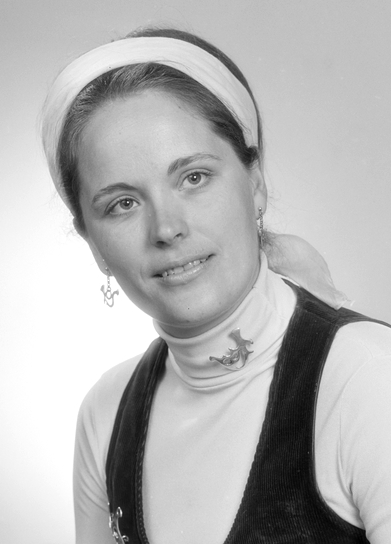
- Born: 20 February 1943
- Died: 24 April 2019 (aged 76)
- Occupation: Physician
- Awards: Order of St. Olav (2014)

Babill Stray-Pedersen (20 February 1943 – 24 April 2019) was a Norwegian physician.

She graduated as cand.med. in 1969, dr.med. in 1979, and was approved specialist in obstetrics and gynaecology in 1985. Following a career as physician at the Aker Hospital, she was eventually appointed professor at the University of Oslo. She was decorated Knight, First Class of the Order of St. Olav in 2014. She died in April 2019.

== Selected works ==
- Toxoplasma infection and pregnancy. Thesis/dissertation. Oslo. 1978. OCLC 603441082.
