= Nina Karin Monsen =

Norwegian moral philosopher and author (born 1943)

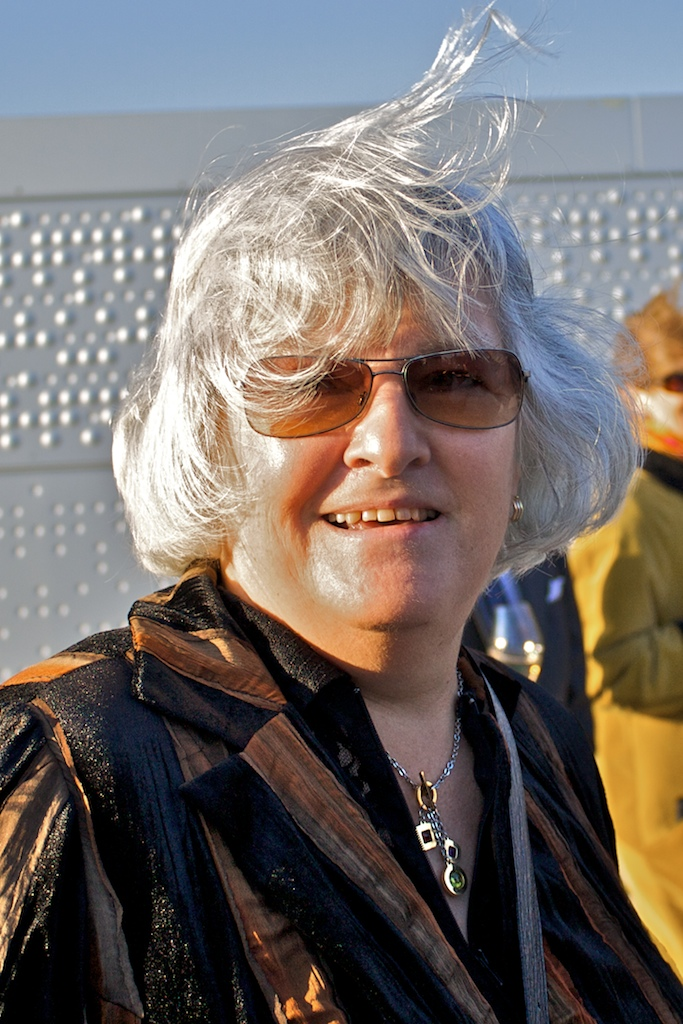
- Monsen at the Fritt Ord Award ceremony in 2009
- Born: 29 May 1943 (age 83)

Philosophical work
- Era: 20th Century, 21st Century
- Region: Western philosophy
- School: Feminist philosophy, personalism

Nina Karin Monsen (born 29 May 1943) is a Norwegian moral philosopher and author. She has written several books, both non-fiction and fiction, and has been active in Norwegian public debate since the early 1970s.

== Life ==
Monsen has a Magister's degree in Philosophy (1969) and was one of the founders of the Norwegian new feminist movement in 1970. Her early work was on the logician Quine and she later studied feminist philosophy. She has become the most visible proponent of Personalism in Norway, with Det elskende menneske (The loving human being, 1987) as her most central work.

Monsen grew up in a humanist family, and later converted to Christianity. She lectures in evangelical churches.

She was appointed a government scholar in 2004. In 2009, she was awarded the Fritt Ord Award.

She was married to legal scholar Helge Johan Thue, until he died in 2010.

== Publications ==
=== Non-fiction ===
- Det kvinnelige menneske. Aschehoug, 1975
- Jomfru, mor eller menneske Universitetsforlaget, 1984
- Det elskende menneske, person og etikk (1987)
- Det Kjempende menneske, person og etikk (1990)
- Velferd uten ansikt, en filosofisk analyse av velferdsstaten (1998)
- Kunsten å tenke, en filosofisk metode til et bedre liv (2001)
- Den gode sirkel, en filosofi om helse og kjærlighet (2002)
- Det sårbare menneske, en filosofi om skam, skyld og synd (2004)
- Livstro, lesetykker (2005)
- Det innerste valget (2007)
- Kampen om ekteskapet og barnet (2009)

=== Fiction ===
- Under Godhetens synsvinkel, essays, 1992
- Kvinnepakten, novel, 1977
- Jammersminne, novel, 1980
- Dødt liv, short stories, 1987
- Inntrengere, novel, 1989
- Tvillingsjeler, novel, 1993

Awards
Preceded by Per-Yngve Monsen	Recipient of the Fritt Ord Award; 2009	Succeeded by Bushra Ishaq and Abid Raja
