= Christopher Bakken =

American poet (born 1967)

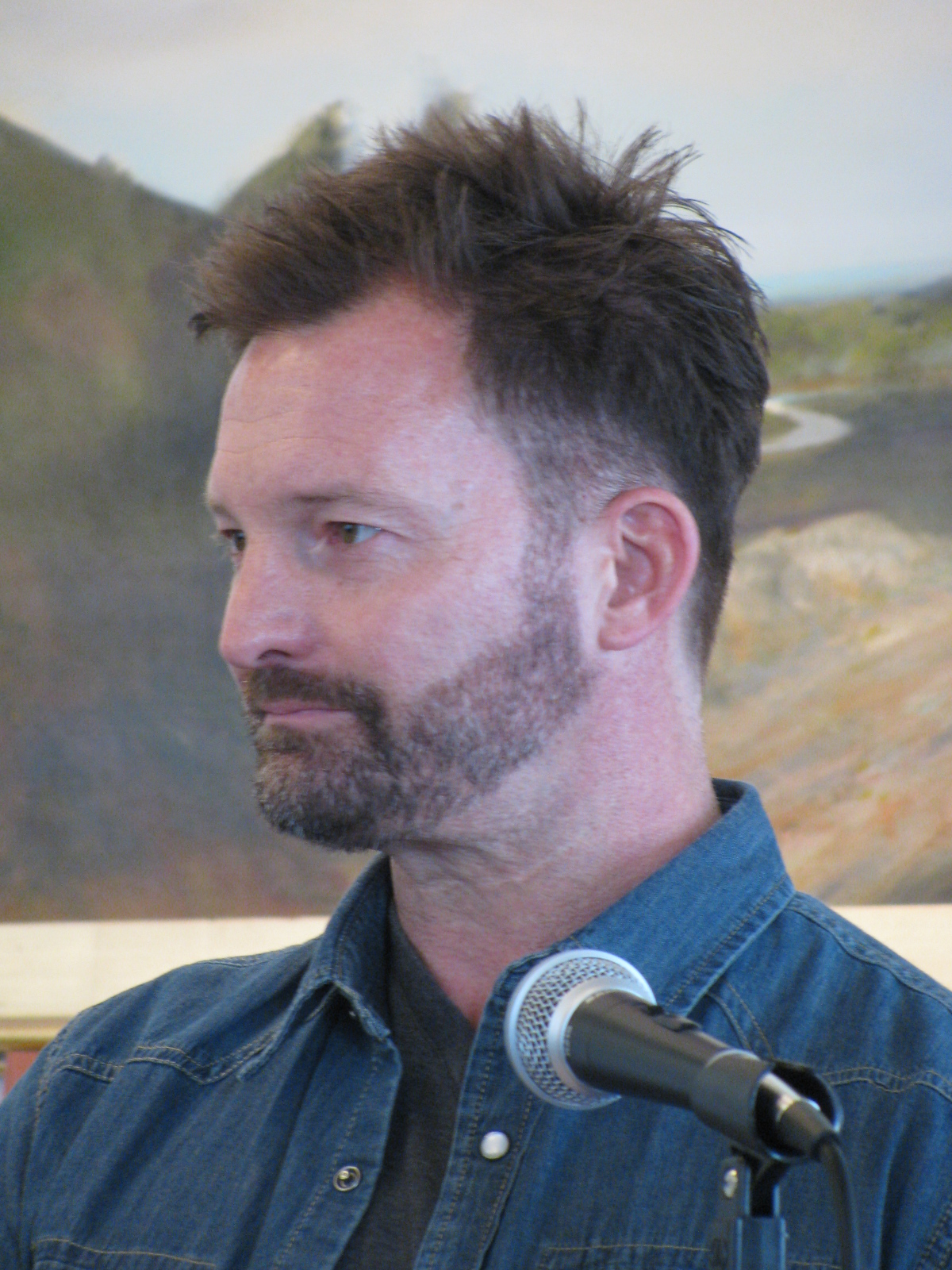
Christopher Bakken

Christopher Bakken (born 1967 in Madison, Wisconsin) an American poet, translator, chef, travel writer, and professor at Allegheny College.

He graduated from Columbia University with an M.F.A. and from University of Houston with a Ph.D. in literature and creative writing. He was a Fulbright Scholar twice: in American Studies at the University of Bucharest in 2008 and again at Aristotle University of Thessaloniki in Greece in 2021. He is Director of Writing Workshops in Greece: Thessaloniki and Thasos. Bakken serves as poetry editor of Ergon: Greek/American and Diaspora Arts & Letters.

His work has appeared in POETRY, The Paris Review, Georgia Review, Gettysburg Review, Wall Street Journal, Michigan Quarterly Review, The Iowa Review, Parnassus, Raritan, Southwest Review, and Western Humanities Review. His first poetry collection, After Greece (2001), was published by Truman State University Press after he won the T. S. Eliot Prize (Truman State University).

His burger recipe won a Food & Wine contest.

== Works ==
=== Books ===
- Driving the Beast. Sewanee Poetry Series. Louisiana State University Press, 2025. ISBN 0-8071-8475-6
- Eternity & Oranges. Pitt Poetry Series, 2016. ISBN 9780822964049
- Honey, Olives, Octopus: Adventures at the Greek Table University of California Press, 2013, ISBN 9780520275096
- Goat Funeral Sheep Meadow Press, 2006, ISBN 9781931357388
- After Greece Truman State University Press, 2001, ISBN 9781931112000

=== Translations ===
- The Lions’ Gate: Selected Poems of Titos Patrikios, Translated Christopher Bakken, Roula Konsolaki, Truman State University Press, 2006, ISBN 9781931112642

=== Poems ===
- "For the Dead Union." Plume. 2024.
- "White Zinfandel" Plume. 2022.
- "Driving the Beast." Academy of American Poets poets.org. 2017
- "Confession" The Missouri Review 2012
- "Some Things Along Strada C.A. Rosetti", Parnassus: Poetry in Review via Poetry Daily. 2009.
- "Portrait Detail, with Pear", AGNI 2006
- "Lesvos" Academy of American Poets 2016
- "Driving the Beast". Academy of American Poets 2017
- "Gorgona." Juxtaprose

=== Anthologies ===
- "Negative Theology. Braving the Body. Small Harbor Editions, 2024. ISBN 1-957248-21-1
- "Assos." The Eloquent Poem. Persea Books. ISBN 0-89255-500-9
- "Sentence." Best American Poetry. 2016. Scribner. ISBN 978-1-5011-2756-4
- Kindled Terraces: American Poets in Greece, Truman State University Press, 2004. ISBN 1-931112-37-1
- "Ohio Elegy", Poets against the War, Editors Sam Hamill, Sally Anderson, Thunder's Mouth Press, 2003, ISBN 978-1-56025-539-0
- "Home Thoughts, from Abroad", Under the rock umbrella: contemporary American poets, 1951–1977, Editor William J. Walsh, Mercer University Press, 2006, ISBN 978-0-88146-047-6

== Reviews ==
- Review of Eternity & Oranges by Eric Smith in Pleiades: Literature in Context
- Review of Eternity & Oranges in The Literary Review
- Review of Eternity & Oranges at American Microreviews

If Bakken can, in the future, stay put in his resplendent Hellenic-inflected imagination for a good while, and avoid the art museum and his personal library, he may just write a book with the smell, taste, and texture of ambrosia. Goat Funeral isn’t quite that, but it’s not chopped liver, either.

== Awards ==
- 2021 Fulbright Scholar: Aristotle University of Thessaloniki, Greece
- 2008 Fulbright Scholar: University of Bucharest
- 2005 Willis Barnstone Translation Prize
- 2006 Helen C. Smith Memorial Prize by the Texas Institute of Letters
- 2001 T. S. Eliot Prize for Poetry for After Greece.
