= Gunnar Breivik =

Norwegian sociologist

Gunnar Breivik (born 8 April 1943) is a Norwegian sociologist.

He was born in Oslo. Specializing in the sociology of sports, he was hired as an associate professor at the Norwegian School of Sport Sciences in 1975. He was promoted to professor in 1985, and was the rector there since 1999. Sigmund Loland took over in 2005.

Academic offices
Preceded by Per Wright	Rector of the Norwegian School of Sport Sciences; 1999–2005	Succeeded by Sigmund Loland
