= Helge Rykkja =

Norwegian writer (1943–2020)

Helge Rykkja (27 August 1943 – 13 June 2020) was a Norwegian author, poet, teacher and politician.

He was born in Mysen, started working at a lower secondary school in Kragerø in 1974 and took the cand.philol. degree in 1979. From 1966 to 1970, he was an editorial board member of the radical periodical Profil, and from 1968, he was a chief editor. He represented the Red Electoral Alliance in Kragerø city council from 1987 to 2003; some times as a deputy representative. He also worked to free Adem Demaçi from prison in 1990.

He made his lyrical debut in 1966 with the poetry collection Bok. When it was re-released in 1997, it acquired "a certain classic status", according to conservative newspaper Aftenposten.

He died on 13 June 2020.

== Books ==
- Bok (Poems, 1966, Kommet; Re-released in 1997, Aschehoug Forlag)
- Poesi (Poems, 1968, Pax Forlag)
- Kommune (Poems, 1979, Oktober Forlag)
- Draken i solbærbuskane (Poems, 1982, Oktober Forlag)
- Blokka ungeberget (Book for Children, 1983, Oktober Forlag)
- Formalisten (Novel, 1984, Arbeidern Forlag)
- Filosofi, sa du. Ein Syklut (Poems, 1994, Aschehoug Forlag)
- Eit kjærleikstema (Poems, 1997, Aschehoug Forlag)
- Eit hus mellom andre (Poems, 2003, Aschehoug Forlag)
- Slutningar til knes (Poems, 2004, Aschehoug Forlag)
