= Kapital (magazine) =

Norwegian business magazine

Kapital is a Norwegian business magazine based in Oslo. It was founded in 1971 by Trygve Hegnar who is still the magazine's chief editor. The magazine is published biweekly. They are known for their annual "Norway's 400 richest" lists. The following annual lists are also published by Kapital: Norway's Most Powerful Women (between 2010 and 2017) and Norway's Bests Analysts.

In 1997 the circulation of Kapital was 40,000 copies.
