= Egil Egebakken =

Norwegian artist (1943–2024)

- Born: 18 January 1943; Egersund, Norway
- Died: 28 January 2024 (aged 81)
- Education: University of Oslo
- Occupation: Visual artist

Egil Egebakken (18 January 1943 – 28 January 2024) was a Norwegian visual artist.

== Personal life ==
Egil Egebakken was born in Egersund on 18 January 1943, a son of Olav Egebakken and Astrid Kolbekk. He was married to Reidun Næss.

== Career ==
Egebakken first studied natural sciences at the University of Oslo, and worked as schoolteacher until the 1970s, when he changed his career from science to art. He studied at Asker malerskole under Herman Bendixen from 1970 to 1973. From 1975 he was assigned as art critic for Asker og Bærum Budstikke. He settled and painted in Asker, and also spent much time in his small country house in Varhaug, painting landscapes from Jæren.

In her book Jærmaleriet art historian Hild Sørby characterizes Egebakken as having a romantic attitude towards nature. He typically preferred a high viewpoint, a wide view of the landscape towards the distant ocean. He had exhibitions in a number of cities in Norway, including Egersund, Stavanger, Asker, Oslo, Kristiansand, Drammen, Haugesund, Larvik and Fredrikstad.

Egebakken died on 28 January 2024, at the age of 81.
