= Wenche Krossøy =

Norwegian children's writer

Wenche Krossøy (25 October 1943 – 12 March 2010) was a Norwegian children's writer.

She issued the books Mens pappa er på Lofoten (1974), Magdalena (1977), Den sovande fuglen (1983) and Blåhuset (1985) and then the picture books Gullnøkkelen (1987), Den kvite steinen (1989), Angelus (1993) and Evighetslyset (1997).
