= Synnøve Tronsvang =

Norwegian politician (born 1943)

Synnøve Tronsvang (born 22 June 1943) is a Norwegian politician for the Labour Party.

She served as a deputy representative to the Norwegian Parliament from Hedmark during the term 1981–1985. In total she met during 8 days of parliamentary session.
