= Bjarne Hodne =

Norwegian folklorist (born 1943)

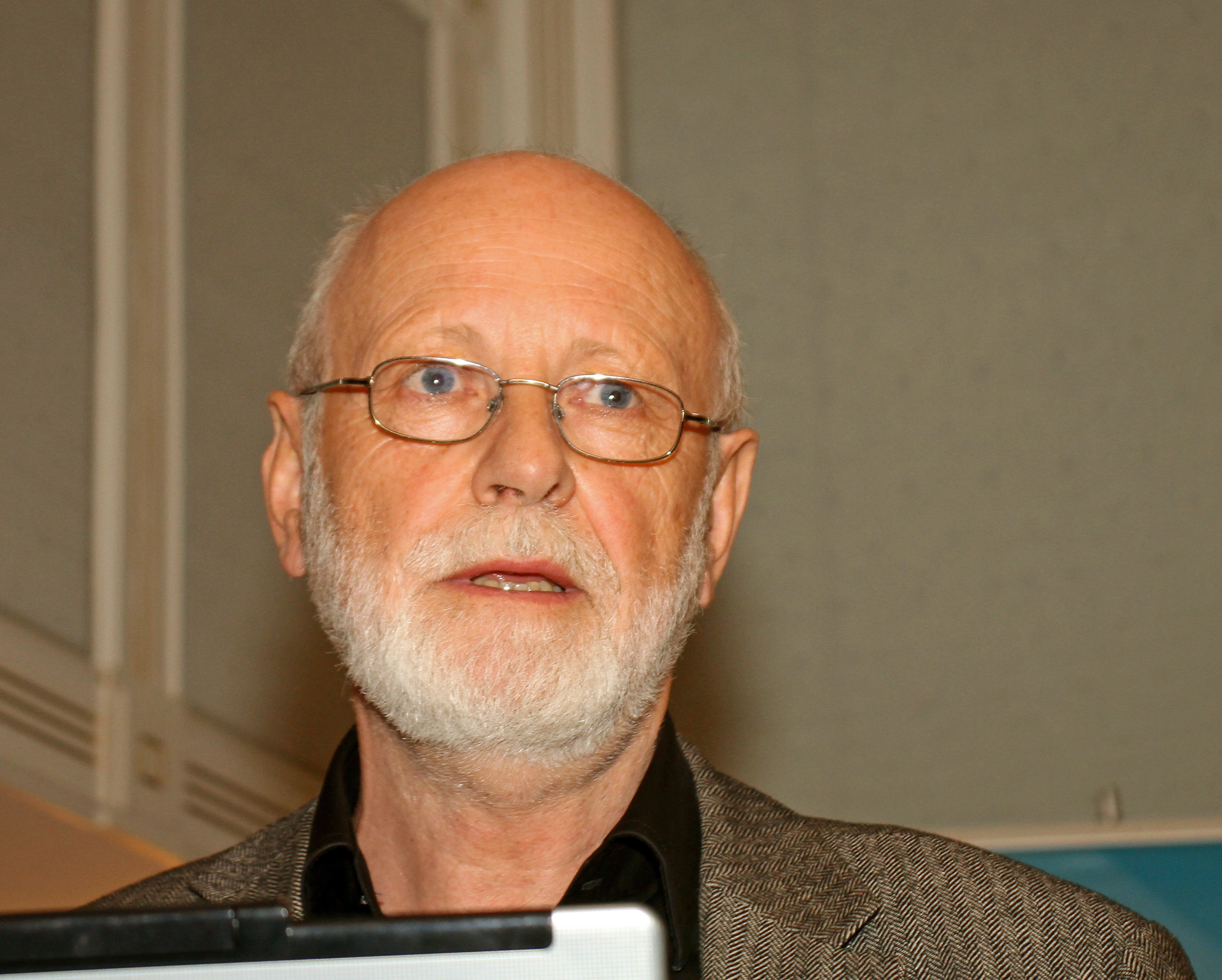
Bjarne Hodne

Bjarne Hodne (born 15 October 1943) is a Norwegian folklorist.

He defended his dr.philos. degree in 1973 with the thesis Personalhistoriske sagn. En studie i kildeverdi. He worked as a lecturer at the University of Oslo from 1975 to 1976, docent from 1976 to 1984 and professor from 1985. He was the dean of the Historical-Philosophical Faculty (now: the Faculty of Humanities) from 1991 to 1997. He is a member of the Norwegian Academy of Science and Letters. In 2007 he became leader of the trade union Norwegian Association of Researchers.

Academic offices
Preceded by	Dean of the Historical-Philosophical Faculty, University of Oslo; 1991–1997	Succeeded by Even Hovdhaugen
