= Svein Hansen =

Norwegian ice hockey player (1943–2012)

Personal information
- Born: 18 April 1943 Oslo, Norway
- Died: 14 August 2012 (aged 69) Lillestrøm

Sport
- Sport: Ice hockey
- Club: Vålerengens IF

Svein Norman Hansen (18 April 1943 – 14 August 2012) was a Norwegian ice hockey player. He played for the Norwegian national ice hockey team, and participated at the Winter Olympics in 1964, 1968 and 1972. He played a total of 69 matches in the Olympics and world championships for the national team.

Playing for the Norwegian club Vålerengens IF, he won the national championship eight times, in 1962, 1963, 1965, 1966, 1967, 1968, 1969 and 1970.

He died in Lillestrøm on 14 August 2012.
