= Ellen Francke =

Norwegian poet and novelist

- Born: 5 December 1943
- Died: 3 November 1990 (aged 46)
- Occupations: Poet, novelist, playwright

Ellen Francke (5 December 1943 – 3 November 1990) was a Norwegian poet, novelist and playwright.

== Literary career ==
Born on 5 December 1943, Francke made her literary debut in 1978, with the poetry collection Ingen har bruk for oss. In 1978 she also published the novel Det er noko eg må snakke med deg om. in 1980 she wrote the audio play Rom 23 for Radioteatret, and in 1981 the youth novel Isroser, about abortion. Her novel Blendinsgardiner og blå turnsko came in 1983, and her poetry collection Det dobbelte kyss from 1985 was illustrated by Tonje Strøm. Her last novel was Glass from 1989, and her audio play En frost så stor also came in 1989.

Francke died on 3 November 1990, aged 46.
