= Ege Olusegun Adebisi =

Nigerian politician

Hon. Ege Olusegun Adebisi

Member, Lagos State House of Assembly
- Incumbent
- Assumed office 2023
- Constituency: Ojo Constituency I

Personal details
- Born: January 1, 1983 (age 43) Ojo, Lagos, Nigeria
- Party: All Progressives Congress (APC)
- Occupation: Politician, Philanthropist
- Website: Lagos Assembly Profile

Ege Olusegun Adebisi (born 1983), is a Nigerian politician who currently represents Ojo Constituency I at the Lagos State House of Assembly. He is the Chairman of the House Committee on Housing.

== Early life ==
Olusegun Adebisi is the son of the late High Chief Richard Afolabi Ege, a political figure in the Badagry Division of Lagos State.

== Political career ==
Ege Olusegun Adebisi contested and won the seat to represent Ojo Constituency I in the Lagos State House of Assembly during the 2023 general elections on the platform of the All Progressives Congress (APC).

Upon his inauguration into the 10th Assembly, he was appointed as the Chairman of the House Committee on Housing. In this capacity, he plays a vital role in overseeing the allocation of Lagos State Low-Cost Housing Estates and mediating disputes within state-owned housing schemes.
