= Magnhild Holmberg =

Norwegian politician

Magnhild Holmberg (12 March 1943 – 27 August 2013) was a Norwegian politician for the Progress Party.

She served as a deputy representative to the Parliament of Norway from Telemark during the terms 1993–1997 and 2005–2009. In total she met during 61 days of parliamentary session. She was also a Skien local politician. She died in August 2013 after a long battle with cancer.
