= Kine Aune =

Norwegian animation film creator (1943–2025)

- Born: 10 March 1943
- Died: 26 June 2025 (aged 82); Røros, Norway
- Occupation: Animation film creator
- Employer: NRK

Kine Aune (10 March 1943 – 26 June 2025) was a Norwegian animation film creator.

== Life and career ==
Born on 10 March 1943, Aune had a background as a presenter on NRK Barne-TV, where she presented shows such as Sandkassa, Krummelure, and Barnas kimo.

Her animation film debut was Kjenn Føtter-leken from 1981, which she made jointly with Jacob Koch. In 1984, she made the cutout animation film En mørkreddhistorie. Her international breakthrough was Hva skal vi gjøre med lille Jill? from 1987, based on a book by Fam Ekman, with music by Åge Aleksandersen. The film received first prize at a film festival in Shanghai in 1988, and has been regarded as an international breakthrough for Norwegian animation film. Further films are Kyss katta from 1991, and For et svin jointly with Bob Godfrey from 1993, and Den magiske tiden, based on Sami myths.

She was awarded the cultural prize from Sør-Trøndelag county for 2013.

Aune died in Røros on 26 June 2025, at the age of 82.
