= Sven Trygve Falck =

Norwegian engineer, businessperson, and politician (1943–2019)

Sven Trygve Falck (9 March 1943 – 27 August 2019) was a Norwegian engineer, businessperson and politician for the Conservative Party.

He was born in Tønsberg as a son of bookseller Trygve Falck (1905–1974) and housewife Inger Erikson (1909–1995). He finished his secondary education in 1962 and took the siv.ing. degree in chemical engineering at the Norwegian Institute of Technology in 1967. While studying he edited Under Dusken in 1964.

His first engineering job was at Dow Chemical Co. in Texas from 1967 to 1970. After a year at Dow Chemical Co. in Germany, he was hired in Norsk Hydro in 1971. He was an engineer for Norsk Hydro at Rafnes from 1975, then chief engineer for Norsk Hydro in Porsgrunn from 1976 to 1981.

He was a member of Porsgrunn city council from 1977 to 1979, then the executive committee of Telemark county council while also serving as deputy chair of the county school board. He was also elected to the Parliament of Norway from Telemark in 1981, and served through one term as a member of the Standing Committee on Energy and Industry.

After leaving Parliament he was a consultant and business director. He was a board member of Norsk Jern Holding from 1990 to 1993, corporate council member of Norsk Jernverk from 1987 to 1989 and supervisory council member of Manufacturers Hanover Norge from 1986 to 1990 and Den Norske Industribank from 1990 to 1993 (deputy from 1986 to 1990).
