= Mette Ravn =

Norwegian diplomat

Mette Ravn (born 6 December 1943) is a former Norwegian diplomat.

She was counsellor at the Permanent Mission of Norway to the United Nations in New York from 1992 to 1995, Norway's ambassador to Egypt from 1995 to 1999, ambassador to Ethiopia from 2002 to 2006, and to Jordan from 2006 to 2009.
