= Kari Oftedal Lima =

Norwegian politician (1943–2019)

Kari Oftedal Lima (14 December 1943 – 29 May 2019) was a Norwegian politician for the Socialist Left Party.

She served as a deputy representative to the Parliament of Norway from Rogaland during the terms 1993–1997 and 1997–2001. She met during 2 days of parliamentary session.

On the local level she has been a member of Rogaland county council. She is also deputy chair of the board of the Western Norway Regional Health Authority.

She hails from Ålgård.
