= Erik Magnus Boe =

Norwegian legal scholar

Erik Magnus Boe (born 17 April 1943) is a Norwegian legal scholar.

He was born in Oslo. He took his cand.jur. degree in 1970 and the dr.juris. degree in 1980. He worked in the Ministry of Justice from 1970 to 1973, and was also an associate professor at the University of Tromsø from 1972 to 1976. In 1986 he was appointed as a law professor at the University of Oslo. He is a fellow of the Norwegian Academy of Science and Letters.

He resides at Borgen, Akershus.
