= Rolf Groven =

Norwegian painter (1943–2025)

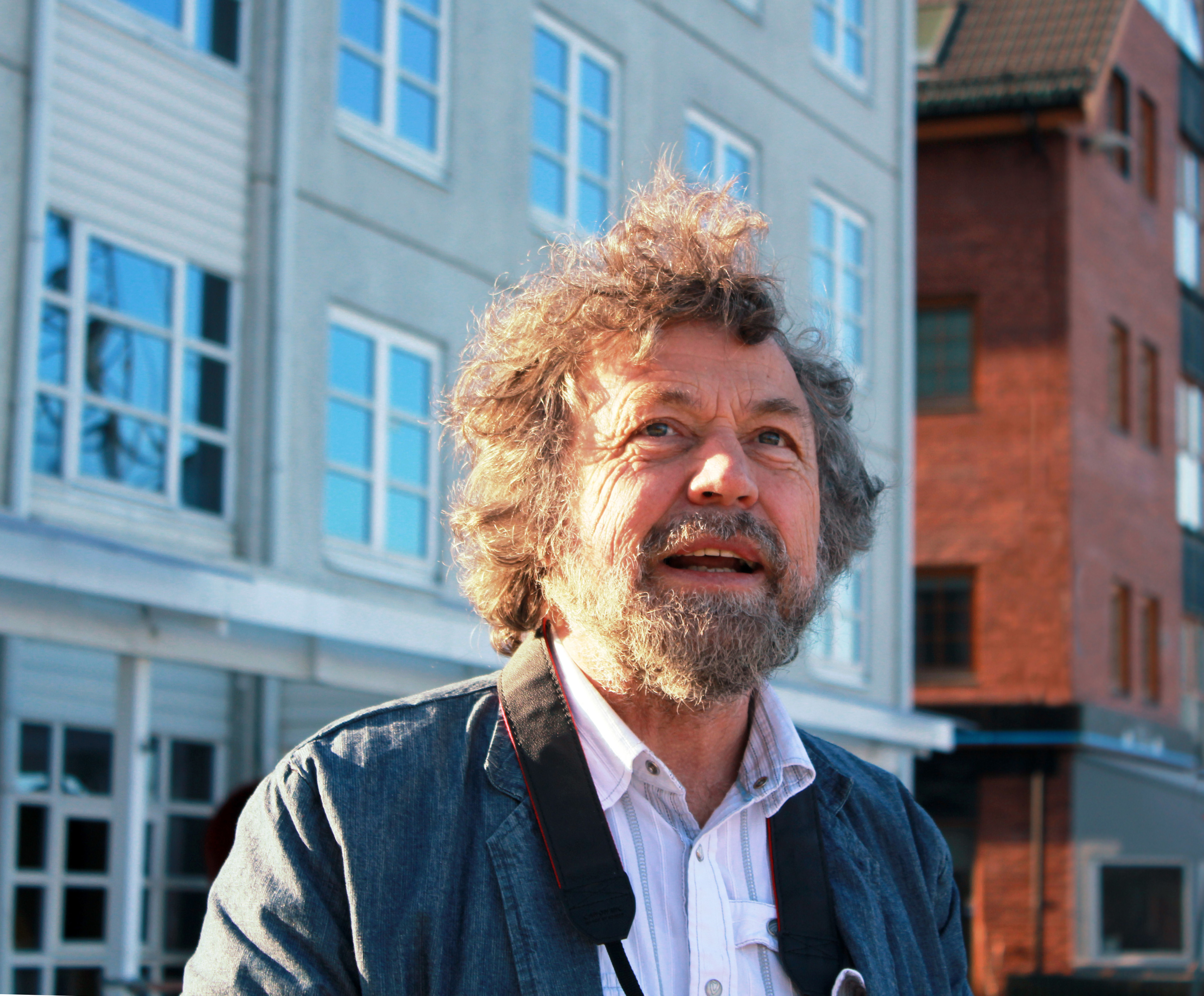
- Groven in 2011
- Born: 11 March 1943; Fræna, German-occupied Norway
- Died: 26 March 2025 (aged 82)
- Known for: Painting, political satire

Rolf Dagfinn Groven (11 March 1943 – 26 March 2025) was a Norwegian painter, known for his satirical art painted in figurative style. Groven's paintings are frequently printed works of art in textbooks used in Norwegian schools, as well as history books.

== Background ==
Groven was born in Romsdal near Molde during the Second World War, and trained as an architect at the Norwegian Institute of Technology (NTH, now a part of NTNU) 1966–72. His participation in the radical Anti-Vietnam War movement convinced him that he should choose an artistic career. He lived in Oslo.

Groven died on 26 March 2025, at the age of 82.

== Common themes ==
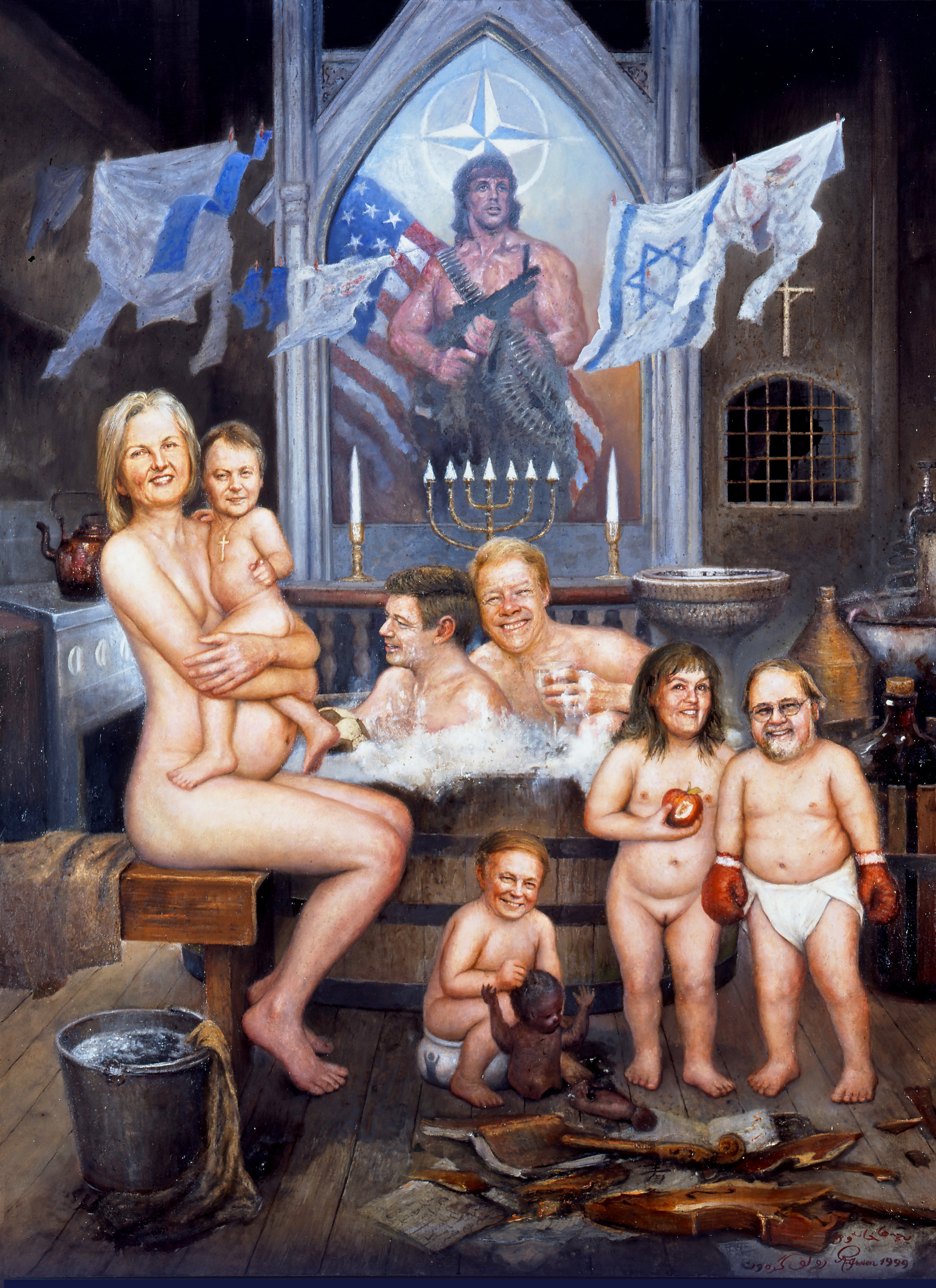
Kinder, Küche, Kirche (oil painting 1999). Portrayed politicians: Valgerd Svarstad Haugland, Vidar Kleppe, Kjell Magne Bondevik, Carl I. Hagen, Øystein Hedstrøm, Anita Apelthun Sæle, Jan Simonsen.

There have been several common themes in his art, ranging from environmentalism, to the European Union, as well as the peace movement and politics. Frequent motifs are religion and scenes from the Romsdal and Lofoten areas of Norway.

Among his environmentally themed works, Groven created several works in the 1970s that propagated the nature conservation. Much of his artwork commented on the fear that the Norway's newly-won status as a petroleum-producing country would lead to excessive pollution. He also commented on the dangers of nuclear power and he agitated for the preservation of waterfalls.

His politically charged works include ones on the European Union, for which Norway has held two referendums about joining. The paintings Norwegian Neo Romanticism from 1972 and Free Flow from 1992 were among the best-known symbols of the popular anti EU-accession movement before these referendums. Groven also commented on American President Donald Trump's 2016 victory.

Groven's art is influenced by painters such as Rembrandt van Rijn, Käthe Kollwitz, as well as Norwegian artists such as Adolph Tidemand, Hans Gude, J.C. Dahl, Christian Krohg and the contemporary caricaturist Finn Graff.

== Selected works ==
- 1972 Norwegian Neo Romanticism (a.k.a. Willoch and Bratteli).
- 1973 Liberty Leading the People. Parody of Eugène Delacroix's Liberty Leading the People with a female Viet Cong soldier personifying Liberty.
- 1975 "Oil Painting". Parody of one of Norway's best-known paintings from the 19th century Tidemand and Gude: Bridal Party in Hardanger, 1848
- 1977 The nuclear power kid 50,000 reproductions of this poster were printed in the 70s and 80s.
- 1978 West coast girl gutting fish (Vestlandsjente). Acquired by the National gallery of Norway.
- 1981 Retribution. Showing a Palestinian crucified as Christ and Menachem Begin as a Christ-killer.
- 1996 Women by church
- 2004 Molde as combat zone Historical recreation of wartime events 29 April 1940.
