= Astrid Bjellebø Bayegan =

Norwegian Lutheran dean

Astrid Sonja Bjellebø Bayegan (born 22 February 1943) became the first female dean in Norway when she was appointed to head the provostship of Drammen prosti on 28 May 1989.

She was ordained in 1975 by Bishop Georg Hille in Hamar Cathedral. She served as a hospital priest in the Aker district of Oslo (1975–1984) and in Blakstad (1984–1989). From 1989 until her retirement in 2008, she was the dean in Drammen as well as vicar of Bragernes.

Born in Fjelberg Municipality on 22 February 1943, Astrid Sonja Bjellebø is the daughter of Samson Bjellebø (1909–1997) and Else Aksdal (1917–1999). She attended high school in Bryne, spent a year in Scotland, and later moved with her family to Stavanger. She studied theology at the MF Norwegian School of Theology where she graduated as Cand.theol. in 1972, before taking the practical theological examination at the University of Oslo in 1973.

In 1972, Bayegan had already begun to work at the hospital in Aker as a theologian. Following her ordination in 1975, she continued there as the hospital's priest until 1984 when she moved to the hospital in Blakstad. On 28 May 1989, she was appointed dean of the Drammen prosti, the first woman in Norway to receive the title of prost or dean.

Astrid Bjellebø Bayegan is married to the Iranian-born Hedayat Markus Bayegan, a retired scientist, and has four daughters.
