= Jan Knutzen =

Jan Knutzen (born 29 June 1943) is a Norwegian documentary filmmaker from Oslo.

He is considered to be among the most unique voices of Scandinavian documentary film. His film Funkis (1992) has been analyzed as an innovative essay film. It is a portrait of Knutzen's childhood in post-war Oslo.

== Filmography ==
- På sporet etter Lars Hertervig (1984)
- Funkis: en film uten altfor mye funksjonalisme (1992)
- Kunstens møte med filmen (1993)
- Svalbard i sort/hvitt og farger: noen biter av Svalbards historie gjenfunnet i gamle filmruller (1993)
- Boplicity (1994)
- Kameramuseet (1997)
- Det 20. århundret i Oslo sett gjennom kameraøyet (2000)
- Fragmente aus Norwegen (2000)
- En liten historie om foto (2007)
