= Egil Hestnes =

Norwegian politician (born 1943)

Egil Hestnes (born 1 June 1943) is a Norwegian politician for the Conservative Party.

He served as a deputy representative in the Norwegian Parliament from Sør-Trøndelag during the terms 1989–1993 and 2001–2005.

On the local level Hestnes was mayor of Hitra Municipality from 1987 to 1999 and 2003 to 2007.
