= Trygve Hegnar =

Norwegian businessman and editor

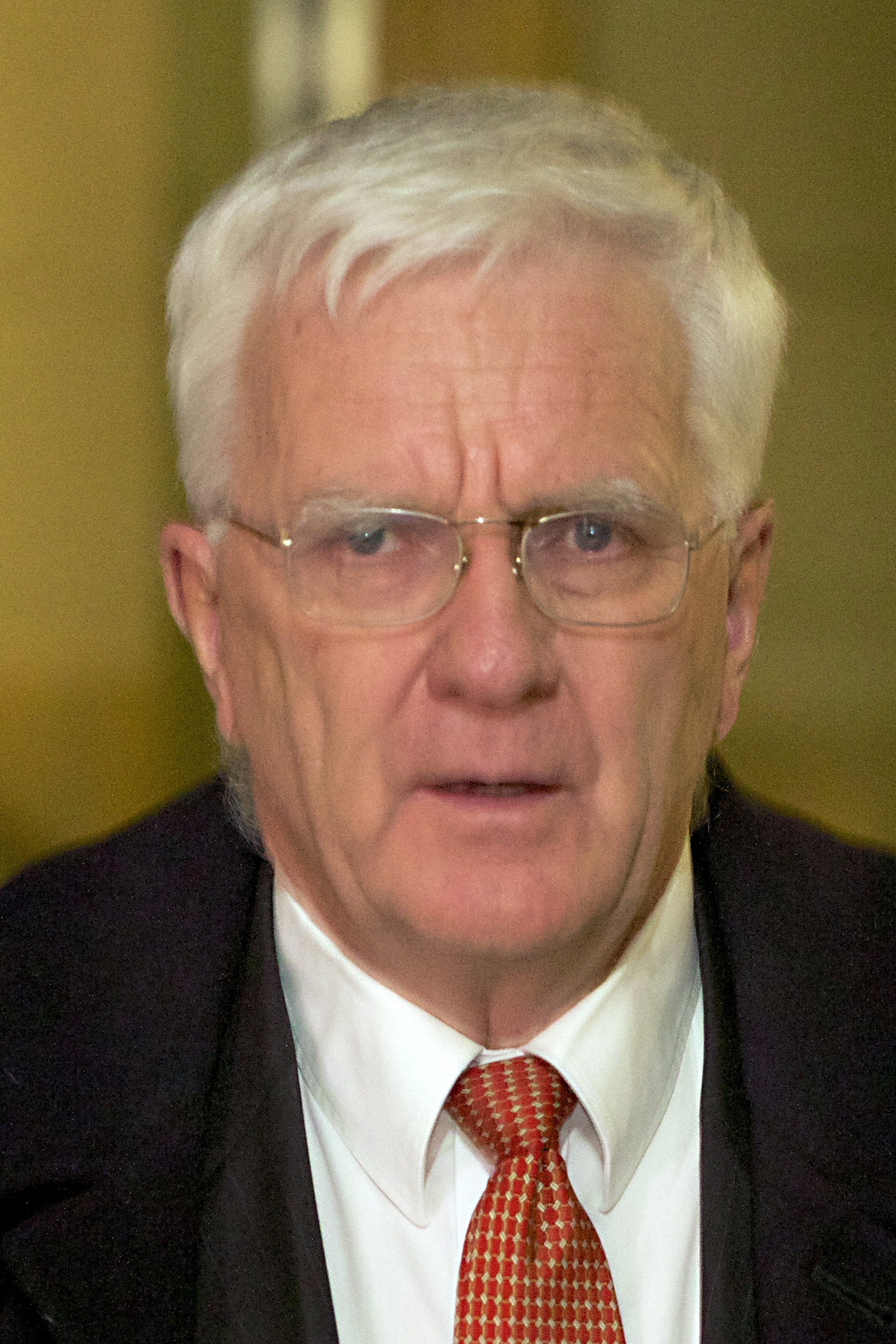
- Born: 6 October 1943 (age 82); Oslo, Norway
- Occupations: Editor and investor
- Website: hegnar.no

Trygve Hegnar (born 6 October 1943) is a Norwegian businessman, investor and chief editor of the business magazines Kapital and Finansavisen, founded by Hegnar himself in 1971 and 1992 respectively. He is a billionaire in NOK (Norwegian krone).

== Early life ==
Hegnar was born in Oslo on 6 October 1943, a son of Per Hegnar and Margrethe Anonsen.

He became Norwegian champion in team handball with the club SK Arild in 1964, and played for the Norwegian national team at the 1964 World Men's Handball Championship. He studied in Germany, and graduated as an economist. He started his career as a researcher at the Institute of Transport Economics upon his return to Norway.

== Career ==
He founded the business magazine Kapital in 1971, which became known for its revealing market news from anonymous writers (often student friends of Hegnar). Hegnar found a particular interest in, and wrote a biography of industrialist Vebjørn Tandberg, and later acquired Tandberg's villa which he turned into the headquarters of Kapital. According to Hegnar, he made his first million NOK in 1976, which he used on the short-lived failed tabloid paper Blikk in 1977.

In 1992 Hegnar used his 26 million NOK profits from selling his shares in Dagens Næringsliv to establish his own rival business newspaper Finansavisen. Hegnar's fortune was estimated by Kapital at 2 billion NOK in 2000, most of which dates from his ownership in the Norwegian Cruise Line (formerly Kloster Cruise with ownership in Vard) from the 1980s, which he sold to Star Cruises. According to himself he initially invested 5 million NOK in 1981, followed by some more, until he sold his shares for 672 million NOK in 1999; roughly a hundred-fold profit.

In 2026, he resigned as Hegnar Media's chairman.

Preceded by	Chair of Ullevål Hospital; 1990–1993	Succeeded by Leif Aune
