= Thor Furulund =

Norwegian painter

- Born: 12 June 1943; Oslo, Norway
- Died: 16 January 2016 (aged 72)
- Education: Beckman Skola, Stockholm
- Occupation: Painter

Thor Furulund (né Thore Furulund; 12 June 1943 – 16 January 2016) was a Norwegian painter.

He was born in Oslo and resided in Bærum.

Furulund was educated at Beckman Skola in Stockholm, and is represented with his art works at Riksgalleriet and at the Royal Palace in Oslo.

His work has been purchased, among other places, by the National Gallery in Norway, the Bærum municipality and the Royal Palace in Norway.

== Exhibitions ==
- 1980 Young Artists' Society, Oslo
- 1981 Gallery Haaken, Oslo
- 1986 Gallery Haaken, Oslo
- 1997 Gallery Haaken, Oslo
- 2000 Gallery Haaken, Oslo
- 2003 Gallery Haaken, Oslo
- 2006 Gallery Haaken, Oslo
