= Hennild Wollstadmo =

Norwegian politician (born 1943)

Hennild Wollstadmo (born 24 July 1943) is a Norwegian politician for the Centre Party.

She served as a deputy representative to the Norwegian Parliament from Nordland during the term 1981–1985. In total she met during 3 days of parliamentary session.
