= Unn Thorvaldsen =

Norwegian javelin thrower

Personal information
- Born: 6 February 1943 (age 83) Haslum, Norway
- Height: 174 cm (5 ft 9 in)
- Weight: 59 kg (130 lb)

Sport
- Sport: Track and Field
- Event: Javelin

Achievements and titles
- Personal best: 54.28 metres (178.1 ft)

Unn Thorvaldsen (born 6 February 1943) is a Norwegian javelin thrower. She was born in Haslum in Bærum. She competed at the 1960 Summer Olympics in Rome. Her personal best is 54.28 metres (178.1 ft).
