= Torbjørn Lie =

Norwegian businessperson and politician

Thorbjørn Lie (17 December 1943 – 19 November 2006) was a Norwegian businessperson and politician for the Progress Party.

He was born in Lardal Municipality, but later settled in Førde Municipality. As a businessperson Lie is notable for founding the helicopter company Airlift in 1987. For a period he was the chief executive officer of the company. He has also been chairman and co-owner of Helilift.

Lie became a member of the municipal council of Sogndal Municipality in 2003. He later served as a deputy representative to the Parliament of Norway from Sogn og Fjordane during the term 2005–2009, but died only one year into the term.
