= Anna Elisabeth Ljunggren =

Norwegian physiotherapist

Anna Elisabeth Ljunggren (née Storm-Mathisen) (13 September 1943 – 29 April 2010) was a Norwegian physiotherapist.

She took her physiotherapist training in 1964. She took the dr.philos. degree in 1977, as the first physiotherapist in Norway, at the University of Oslo. In 1991 she became the first assistant professor in physiotherapy in Norway, at the University of Bergen, and she was promoted to professor in 1995. She was decorated as a Knight, First Class of the Order of St. Olav in 2009. She died in April 2010.
