= Ragnhild Nilstun =

Norwegian writer (born 1943)

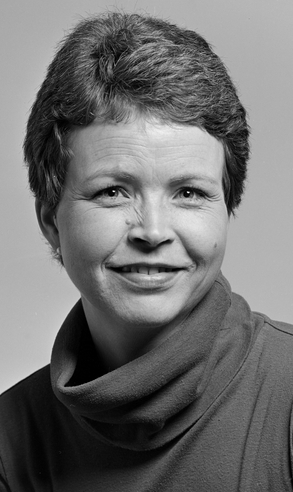
- Born: 31 January 1943 (age 83); Lofoten, Norway
- Education: Philologist
- Occupations: novelist, children's writer and literary critic
- Awards: Amalie Skram Prize (2009)

Ragnhild Nilstun (born 31 January 1943) is a Norwegian novelist, children's writer and literary critic. Her awards include Havmannsprisen and the Amalie Skram Prize.

== Career ==
Born in Lofoten on 31 January 1943, Nilstun is a philologist by education, and has worked at the University of Tromsø. She made her literary debut in 1979 with the novel Etterbyrden, with descriptions of postnatal depression. The novel was also adapted for theatre and staged at Fjernsynsteatret. In 1988 she published the short story collection Begjærets pris. The novel For mitt blikk (1996) depicts life in Finnmark and Troms in the late nineteenth century, and is the first in a trilogy which also includes For kjærlighets skyld (2002; Havmannprisen), and Min lange reise ender her (2007). Her children's books have been translated into several languages. She was awarded the Amalie Skram Prize in 2009.
