= Amund Venger =

Norwegian politician

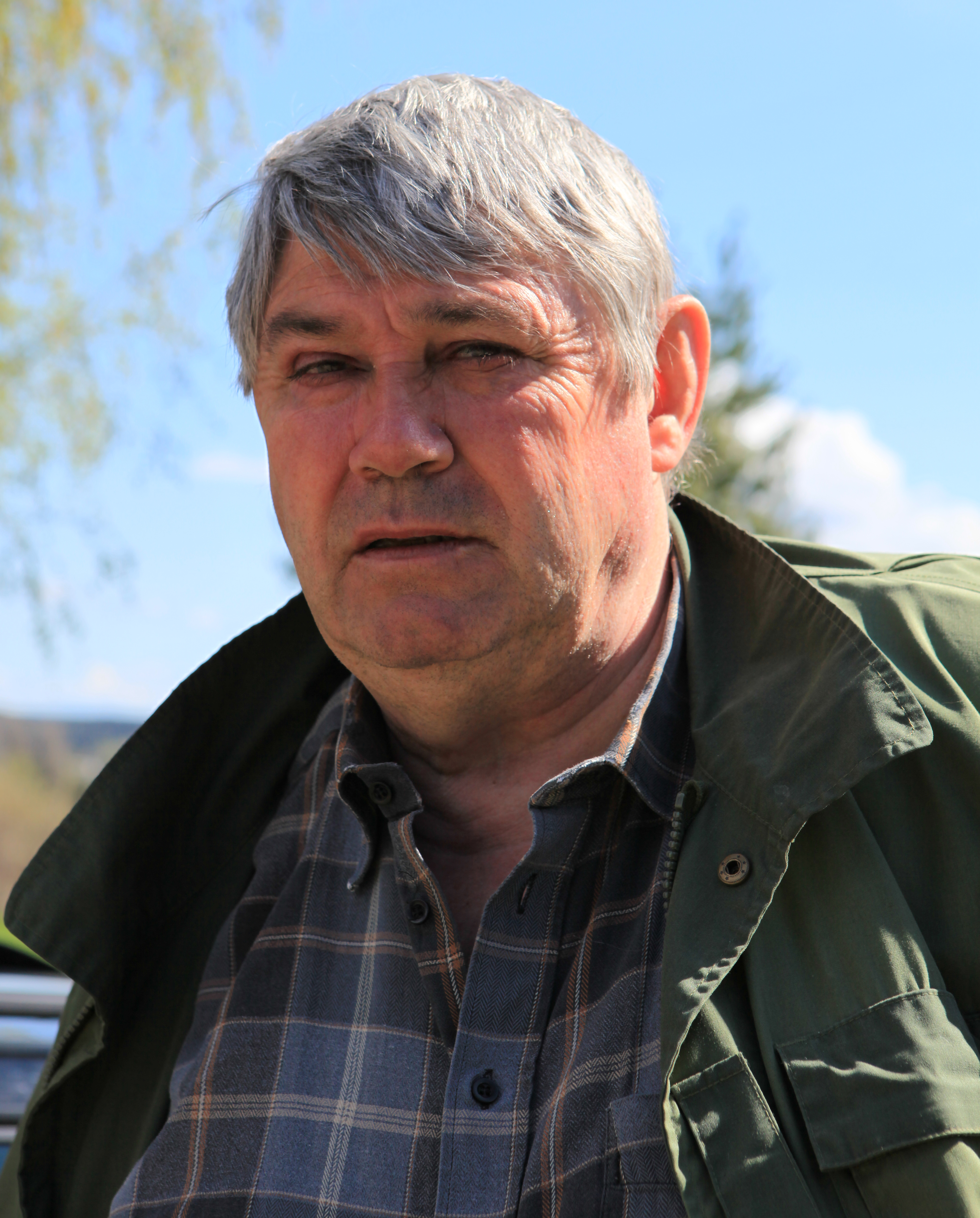
Amund Venger, 2009.

Amund Venger (19 October 1943 – 14 September 2013) was a Norwegian politician for the Centre Party.

He was born and died in Eidsvoll, and was a grandson of politician Anders Venger. He served as director of agriculture in Akershus County Municipality from 1983 to 1984, then served in politics as State Secretary in the Ministry of the Environment from 1984 to 1986 as a part of Willoch's Second Cabinet. He was then a secretary-general in the Norwegian Agrarian Association from 1988 to 1994, and was also active in Nei til EU when they won the 1994 Norwegian European Union membership referendum.
