= Lars Sigmundstad =

Norwegian politician (born 1943)

Lars Sigmundstad (born 29 August 1943) is a Norwegian politician for the Centre Party.

He served as a deputy representative to the Norwegian Parliament from Rogaland during the terms 1969–1973 and 1973–1977. In total he met during 5 days of parliamentary session.
