= Terje Moe (painter) =

Norwegian painter (1943–2004)

Terje Moe (October 16, 1943 - February 27, 2004) was a Norwegian painter.

He studied at the Norwegian National Academy of Craft and Art Industry from 1963 to 1966 and at the Norwegian National Academy of Fine Arts from 1968 to 1969 under Reidar Aulie. The National Museum of Art, Architecture and Design owns six of his works.
