= Jon Bakken =

Norwegian politician

Jon Bakken (born 11 January 1943) is a Norwegian politician for the Socialist Left Party.

He served as a deputy representative to the Parliament of Norway from Sør-Trøndelag during the terms 1985–1989, 1989–1993 and 1993–1997. He met during 32 days of parliamentary session. He was also a member of the municipal council of Selbu Municipality and the Sør-Trøndelag county council.
