= Arvid Gjengedal =

Norwegian politician

Arvid Gjengedal (born 19 July 1943, dead 30 December 2021) was a Norwegian educationalist and politician for the Conservative Party.

He was born in Lom Municipality, finished his secondary education in Lillehammer in 1963 and graduated with a cand.philol. degree in history from the University of Oslo. He was hired at the Notodden Teachers' College in 1971, and when it merged to form the Telemark University College in 1994, Gjengedal became dean of the department of teachers' education. From 1997 to 2003 he served as the rector of the college.

Gjengedal served as a deputy representative to the Norwegian Parliament from Telemark during the term 1985–1989. He has also been an elected member municipal council for Notodden Municipality and on the Telemark county council, both for twelve years. He chaired the county branch of the Conservative Party from 1991 to 1995. In 2005 he unsuccessfully applied for the position of County Governor of Telemark.

Academic offices
Preceded by	Rector of the Telemark University College; 1997–2003	Succeeded by Dag Kjartan Bjerketvedt
