= Claudia Keelan =

American poet, writer, and professor (born 1959)

- Born: 1959 (age 66–67)
- Occupations: Poet; writer; professor

Claudia Keelan (born 1959) is an American poet, writer, and professor. She received the Regents’ Creative Activities Award, at the University of Nevada, Las Vegas.

== Life ==
Claudia Keelan is the author of seven collections of poetry, most recently We Step into the Sea: New and Selected Poems (Barrow Street, 2018). Her book of translations Truth of My Songs: Poems of the Trobairitz, from Omnidawn Press appeared in 2016. Ecstatic Emigre was published in the Poets on Poetry Series from University of Michigan Press in 2018.

Widely anthologized, Keelan was described by the late Robert Creeley as a poet who "keeps the faith for us all" (book cover endorsement of Utopic).

She is the editor of Interim, a print and online journal specializing in poetry, translation, belle lettres and book reviews (www.interimpoetics.com) as well as the editor for The Test Site Poetry Series (University of Nevada Press). She lives in Las Vegas where she is a Barrick Distinguished Scholar.

In 2017, she was part of a literary delegation to Cuba.

She was a judge for the 2021 PEN literary awards.

== Bibliography ==
Full-Length Poetry Collections

- We Step into the Sea New and Selected Poems (Barrow Street, 2018)
- O, Heart (Barrow Street, 2014)
- Missing Her (New Issues Poetry & Prose, 2009)
- The Devotion Field (Alice James Books, 2005 - Finalist, 2005 PEN Center USA Award in Poetry)
- Utopic (Alice James Books, 2000 Beatrice Hawley Award)
- The Secularist (University of Georgia, 1997 - Contemporary Poetry Series winner)
- Refinery (Cleveland State University 1994 - Cleveland State University Poetry Prize winner)

Other Works

- Ecstatic Émigré (University of Michigan Press, 2018)

Translation

- Truth of My Songs: Poems of the Trobairitz," (Omnidawn, 2015).

Chapbooks

- Of and among there was a locus(t) (Ahsahta Press, 2003)

== Honors and awards ==
- 2015 Barrick Distinguished Scholar
- 2010 Creative Achievement Award
- 2007 Jerome Shestack Award, The American Poetry Review
- 2001 Silver Pen Award
- 2000 Beatrice Hawley Award, Alice James Books for Utopic
- 1993 Robert D. Richardson Best Essay award for "Revising the Parade: Against the Poetry of Witness," Denver Quarterly
- 1997 The Secularist nominated for the Los Angeles Times Book Award
- 1992 grant from the Kentucky Foundation for Women
- 1991 fellowship from the Helene Wurlitzer Foundation of New Mexico
- 1990 Jesse Stuart Award for excellence in teaching
