= Carl Johan Ege =

Norwegian banker

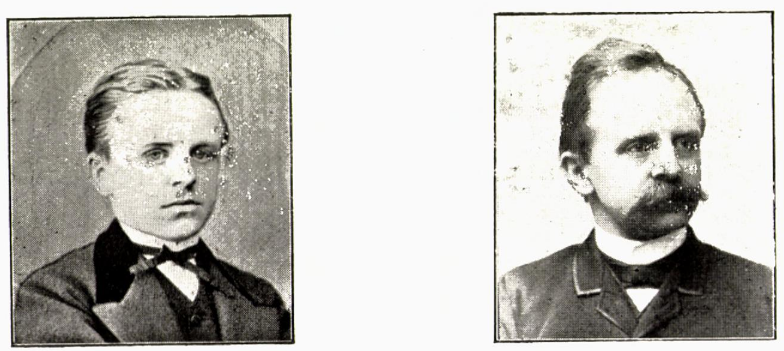

Carl Johan Ege (5 April 1852 – 14 July 1943) was a Norwegian banker.

Born in Bergen as son to Rebekka Paasche and shopper Christian Ege, he enrolled as a student in 1870 and took the cand.jur. degree in 1875. He was hired in Bergens Privatbank in 1876 and was its director from 1886 to 1909. He was decorated as a Knight, First Class of the Order of St. Olav.
