= Norwegian State Educational Loan Fund =

The Norwegian State Educational Loan Fund (Norwegian: Statens lånekasse for utdanning) is a government agency that allocates loans and grants to Norwegian and certain foreign students for their education. Lånekassen was established in 1947.

Lånekassen is organized under the Ministry of Education and Research (Kunnskapsdepartementet). The Ministry decides the regulations for the allocation of financial support, and for the repayment of loans.

== Objectives ==
Lånekassen's objectives for educational support are:

- to provide equal opportunities for education regardless of economic and social background, geographical location, age, gender, or physical disabilities;
- to ensure that society and the workforce have access to competence;
- to secure a satisfactory learning environment and make studies more efficient.

== Organization ==
- Lånekassen's head office is in Oslo and there are branch offices in Stavanger, Trondheim, and Ørsta.
- As of January 2024, Lånekassen has just over 400 permanent employees.

== History ==
- Lånekassen was established in 1947 as an extension of a number of welfare schemes for students.
- In its first year, NOK 3.3 million was given in loans to about 2,200 students.
- Since the late 1950s, support has also been given for upper secondary education.
- Means testing of parents before giving support for higher education was abolished in about 1970.
- Large-scale computer systems for the mass processing of applications were developed during the 1980s and 1990s.
- Changes were made in connection with the quality reform of higher education and grants became dependent on the examination results of each individual student.
- In 2001, it became possible to apply for support electronically, and from 2005 it became possible to sign the acknowledgement of debt electronically.
- Since 2009, pupils and students have only been able to apply for support electronically, rather than on paper.
- Between 2004 and 2015, Lånekassen was in the process of a renewal programme. The modernisation was organized in the renewal programme LØFT (Lånekassens ønskede framtid). The programme involved several projects, the largest of which was to replace the entire customer and case handling solution. The objectives of the renewal were better and more targeted information for customers and partners, increased opportunities for self-service solutions and more automation and streamlining. Today, the customers - both students/pupils and customers who are repaying their loans - are almost totally digital.

== Key figures 2017 ==
- As of 31.12.2017 Lånekassen had 1.087.500 customers. 672,865 of the customers have started their repayment.
- 436,100 students and pupils applied for financial support for the academic year 2016–2017.
- In 2017, Lånekassen processed approximately 843,000 applications for educational support and payment relief/waiver.
- NOK 3.7 billion in grants and NOK 24.2 billion in loans were allocated to the students during the academic year 2016–2017. About NOK 6.3 billion of the allocated loans are expected to be converted into educational grants (the conversion occurs after passing examinations/completing the course of education).
- The lending portfolio (outstanding educational debt) represents approximately NOK 173.8 billion in total.
