= Manfred Gerstenfeld =

Israeli businessman and scholar of antisemitism (1937–2021)

- מנפרד גרסטנפלד
- Born: Vienna, Austria
- Citizenship: Israeli
- Education: Erasmus University; Amsterdam University
- Occupation: Author
- Title: Chairman of the steering committee of the Jerusalem Center for Public Affairs

Manfred Gerstenfeld (Hebrew: מנפרד גרסטנפלד; 1937 – 25 February 2021) was an Austrian-born Israeli author and chairman of the steering committee of the Jerusalem Center for Public Affairs. He founded and directed the center's post-Holocaust and antisemitism program.

== Biography ==
=== Early life and education ===
Manfred Gerstenfeld was born in Vienna, Austria, and grew up in Amsterdam, where he obtained a master's degree in organic chemistry at Amsterdam University. He also studied economics at what is now Erasmus University in Rotterdam. He had a high school teaching degree in Jewish studies from the Dutch Jewish seminary. In 1999, he obtained a Ph.D. degree in environmental studies at Amsterdam University.

=== Career ===
In 1964, he moved to Paris, where he became Europe's first financial analyst specializing in the pharmaceutical industry. He moved to Israel in 1968. There he became the managing director of an economic consultancy firm partly owned by Israel's then-largest bank Bank Leumi. He was an academic reserve officer in the Israeli Army (Israel Defense Forces). Gerstenfeld was a board member of one of Israel's largest companies, the Israel Corporation and several other Israeli companies.

In the opinion of Haaretz journalist Anshel Pfeffer, writing in 2013, Gerstenfeld "is without doubt the greatest authority on anti-Semitism today." Isi Leibler, the former chairman of the Governing Board of the World Jewish Congress, wrote in The Jerusalem Post in 2015: "Gerstenfeld would today ... be considered the most qualified analyst of contemporary anti-Semitism with a focus on anti-Israelism."

Gerstenfeld was an editor of The Jewish Political Studies Review, co-publisher of the Jerusalem Letter/Viewpoints, Post-Holocaust and Anti-Semitism and Changing Jewish Communities and a member of the council of the Foundation for Research of Dutch Jewry, of which he was formerly the vice-chairman. He was chairman of the Board of the Jerusalem Center for Public Affairs, a Jerusalem-based think tank, from 2000 until 2012, where he headed the Institute for Jewish Global Affairs.

He is the 2012 recipient of the Lifetime Achievement Award of the Journal for the Study of Antisemitism. In 2015, he received the International Leadership Award from the Simon Wiesenthal Center. In 2019, Gerstenfeld received the International Lion of Judah Award from the Canadian Institute of Jewish Research in recognition of him as the leading international scholar on contemporary antisemitism.

=== Death ===
Gerstenfeld died on 25 February 2021 in Jerusalem. He is survived by his two sons, Dan and Alon.

== Views ==
=== Antisemitism in Europe ===
Extrapolating from a 2011 study that showed respondents agreed at a high rate with the statement of "Israel is carrying out a war of extermination against the Palestinians", Gerstenfeld concluded that some 150 million, out of 400 million, EU citizens espouse a view that demonizes Israel. According to Gerstenfeld, Holocaust inversion is a mainstream phenomenon in the European Union.

Gerstenfeld claimed in 2009 that Norway had deep "emotional anti-Semitism. The current wave of anti-Semitism shows what people have been holding inside them". Norway's TV 2 subsequently reported that Gerstenfeld said "Norwegians are a barbaric and unintelligent people". Gerstenfeld also accused Erik Fosse and Mads Gilbert, doctors who served in Gazan hospitals during the 2008-2009 War between Israel and the Gaza Strip, of financing Hamas.

Holocaust survivor Imre Hercz criticized Gerstenfeld's "propaganda war against Norway", querying his objectivity and noting that Gerstenfeld had visited Norway only once at that time. When Gerstenfeld was questioned by Jewish community leader Anne Sender about the effect his book about Norwegian antisemitism might have on the Jewish minority in the country, he is reported as replying, "I couldn't care less about the Jewish Community in Norway, all I care about is to get your Jens, Jonas and Kristin off the back of my Prime Minister".

In 2011, Gerstenfeld warned that an investigation into antisemitism in Norway by the Center for Studies of the Holocaust and Religious Minorities was likely to minimize the extent of the problem in Norway and that the centre would lose credibility. In response, Odd-Bjørn Fure, genocide authority and the director of the centre, said that Gerstenfeld "is not worth arguing against. I prefer to deal with serious people. We do not take this person seriously."

After three Norwegian universities declined an offer by Alan Dershowitz (who agreed to waive his fees for the occasion) to deliver lectures on Israel, Gerstenfeld said that Norway's elite is permeated with Israel-haters. Kristina Fumes writing in Ynet, responded that the topic of Scandinavian antisemitism in Israel's English-language media was being hijacked by extremists and that studies show Norway ranks between England and Holland. While 11% of Norwegians displayed antisemitic attitudes, 92% thought children should be taught about the Shoah. According to Gerstenfeld, the study itself is flawed due to the lack of inclusion of Muslim respondents and that while the English conclusions stated that a "limited" degree of antisemitism similar to the UK exists, the study's own data states that 38% consider Israeli actions as similar to Nazi Germany, which he took to be an example of Holocaust inversion and, if so, would be antisemitic according to the Working Definition of Antisemitism.

By his own extrapolation, Gerstenfeld said that Norway has approximately 1.5 million antisemites, whom he defined as "ideological criminals".

=== Criticism of Israel ===
In 2019, Gerstenfeld warned against growing "anti-Israel sentiment" in what he called "ideological" movements, including the human rights movement, feminism, the LGBTQ community, postcolonialism, intersectionality, "extreme veganism", the anti-nuclear movement, and the climate movement. Gerstenfeld recommended professionally discrediting academics who supported the Boycott, Divestment and Sanctions campaign against Israel, and denounced Jews who criticized Israel, such as U.S. Senator Bernie Sanders, as "masochists" and "useful idiots for Israel’s enemies".

== Publications ==
=== Books ===
- Revaluing Italy with Lorenzo Necci (Italian) (1992) ISBN 978-88-200-1457-5
- Environment and Confusion: An Introduction to a Messy Subject (1993) ISBN 978-965-350-043-3
- The State as a Business: Do-It-Yourself Political Forecasting (Italian) (1994) ISBN 978-88-17-84368-3
- Israel’s New Future Interviews (1994)] ISBN 978-965-218-015-5
- Judaism, Environmentalism and the Environment (Thesis). 1998.
- The Environment in the Jewish Tradition: A Sustainable World (Hebrew) (2002)
- Europe’s Crumbling Myths: The Post-Holocaust Origins of Today’s Anti-Semitism] (Foreword by Emil L. Fackenheim) (2003) ISBN 978-965-218-045-2
- The New Clothes of European Anti-Semitism (French)(2004), co-edited with Shmuel Trigano] ISBN 978-2-915376-08-1
- American Jewry's Challenge: Conversations Confronting the Twenty-first Century (Foreword by Jonathan Sarna) (2004) ISBN 978-0-7425-4282-2
- Israel and Europe: An Expanding Abyss? (2005)] ISBN 978-965-218-047-6
- European-Israeli Relations: Between Confusion and Change? (2006)] ISBN 978-965-218-054-4
- Israel at the Polls 2006 with Shmuel Sandler and Jonathan Rynhold (2008) ISBN 978-0-415-41361-9
- Academics against Israel and the Jews]. (Foreword by Natan Sharansky) (2007) ISBN 978-965-218-057-5
- Behind the Humanitarian Mask: The Nordic Countries, Israel, and the Jews (Foreword by Gert Weisskirchen)(2008)] ISBN 978-965-218-066-7
- The Abuse of Holocaust Memory: Distortions and Responses] (Foreword by Abraham H. Foxman) (2009) ISBN 978-965-218-076-6
- Anti-Semitism in Norway: Behind the Humanitarian Mask (Foreword by Finn Jarle Saele) (Norwegian) (2010) ISBN 978-965-218-066-7
- Israel at the Polls 2009 with Shmuel Sandler and Hillel Frisch (2010) ISBN 978-0-415-56065-8
- Het Verval. Joden in een stuurloos Nederland (The Decay. Jews in a Rudderless Netherlands) (Dutch) (2010) ISBN 978-90-490-2406-2
- Judging the Netherlands:the Renewed Holocaust Restitution Process 1997-2000] (Foreword by Stuart E. Eizenstat) (2011) ISBN 978-965-218-097-1
- Demonizing Israel and the Jews. (Foreword by Rabbi Marvin Hier) (2013) ISBN 978-1-61861-334-9
- (with: Françoise S. Ouzan) (2014) ISBN 978-90-04-27776-2
- The war of a million cuts] (foreword by Jose Maria Aznar) (2015) ISBN 978-1-61861-341-7
- Israel at the Polls 2013: Continuity and Change in Israeli Political Culture. (with Eithan Orkibi) (2015) ISBN 978-1-138-94587-6
- Israel at the Polls 2015: A Moment of Transformative Stability. (with Eithan Orkibi) (2017) ISBN 978-0-367-14313-8
- Anti-Israelism and Antisemitism. (Foreword by Edna Brocke) (German) (2018) ISBN 978-3-17-028887-4
- Veerkracht [Resilience] with Wendy Cohen Wierda (Foreword by Chief Rabbi Binyomin Jacobs) (Dutch) (2019) ISBN 978-90-490-2431-4
