= NORWAC =

Norwegian NGO

- Norwegian Aid Committee
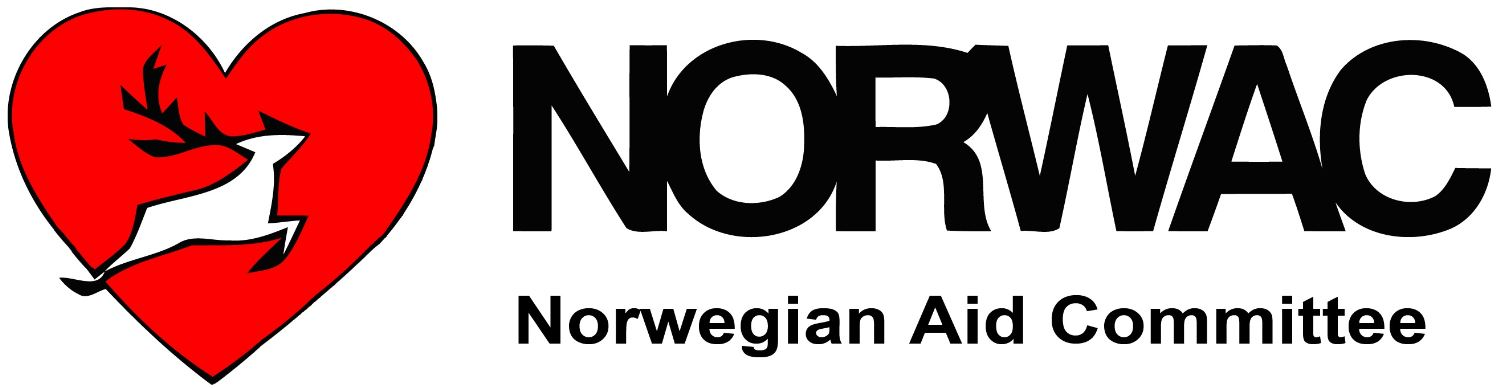
- Formation: 1983
- Type: Non-governmental organization
- Purpose: Humanitarian aid, healthcare, and support for Palestinians
- Headquarters: Norway
- Website: www.norwac.no

NORWAC (Norwegian Aid Committee) is a Norwegian non-governmental organization founded in 1983, and since 1994 organised as a foundation.

The organisation is part of the Norwegian left-wing pro-Palestinian solidarity movement. It has worked in support of Palestinians in the Palestinian territories and in Lebanon since its foundation. From 1999 to 2011 the organisation also worked in the Balkans, and it has worked in Syria since 2012. The group has been profiled by the medical doctors Mads Gilbert and Erik Fosse (president of NORWAC) during the conflicts in Gaza.

== Controversies ==
In 1989 the organisation came under scrutiny from the research team of Marianne Heiberg from NUPI as part of a broad investigation of aid organisations funded by public allocations. The organisation was criticised for minimal-to-none developmental effects, lack of understanding of local needs, lack of control mechanisms and unprofessional management. NORWAC was also criticised for supporting fringe factions in Palestinian politics, and concluded that it did not meet the most elementary requirements for an aid organisation, in particular due to its "sectarian" work and taking political concerns. The report recommended to NORAD to stop all public allocations to the organisation. NORWAC was also scrutinised during a subsequent investigation of funds allocated by the Ministry of Foreign Affairs.

During the conflicts in Gaza in 2009 and 2014, Gilbert and Fosse were accused in Norway and abroad of facilitating propaganda by Hamas. Their work at the Al-Shifa Hospital has been particularly noted amid allegations of the hospital's use as a Hamas headquarter. In 2014 Gilbert was banned indefinitely from entering Gaza through Israel, officially for "security reasons", but according to intelligence sources because there had been revealed "close ties" between Gilbert and Hamas-leaders.

In 2014 it was reported that a hospital run by NORWAC in Syria in the town Tell Abyad treated wounded soldiers from terrorist organisation ISIL (Islamic State of Iraq and the Levant). Since 2013, when the hospital started being funded through NORWAC by Norwegian public aid, it was reported that ISIL had taken full control of the hospital and the surrounding area. According to both Arab and Kurdish sources, the hospital had become reserved entirely for ISIL soldiers and supporters. Erik Fosse rejected the latter reports, while admitting that the hospital treated ISIL jihadists. After subsequent investigations by the Ministry of Foreign Affairs found that ISIL had enforced religious rules at the hospital, including rituals for prayer, gender segregation and regulations on clothing, Foreign Minister Børge Brende cancelled all financial support directed to the hospital. While conforming to the decision, Fosse and NORWAC continued to deny that there were any enforcements by ISIL at the hospital.
