= Tromsø Heliport, University Hospital =

- IATA: none; ICAO: ENTU

Summary
- Airport type: Private
- Owner: University Hospital of North Norway
- Operator: Lufttransport
- Serves: Tromsø, Norway
- Location: Tromsøya, Tromsø
- Coordinates: 69.683885°N 18.984726°E

Map
- Location within Norway

Helipads
Number	Length		Surface
Number	m	ft	Surface
			Asphalt

Tromsø Heliport, University Hospital (Norwegian: Tromsø helikopterplass, Universitetssykehuset) is a heliport situated on the premises of University Hospital of North Norway in the city of Tromsø in Tromsø Municipality in Troms county, Norway. Used exclusively for air ambulance services, it is home to an AgustaWestland AW139 operated by Lufttransport on contract with the National Air Ambulance Service. The base is owned by the University Hospital of North Norway. The base opened in 1988.

== History ==
A private air ambulance service was established in Tromsø in 1985. It consisted of a Bell 205 and was based a what was then known as Tromsø Regional Hospital. The range allowed it to reach from Ballangen Municipality to Alta Municipality. Meanwhile, Norsk Luftambulanse announced plans to establish a base in Tromsø themselves. The competition between the two companies caused a poor coordination climate between the hospital and the operating companies.

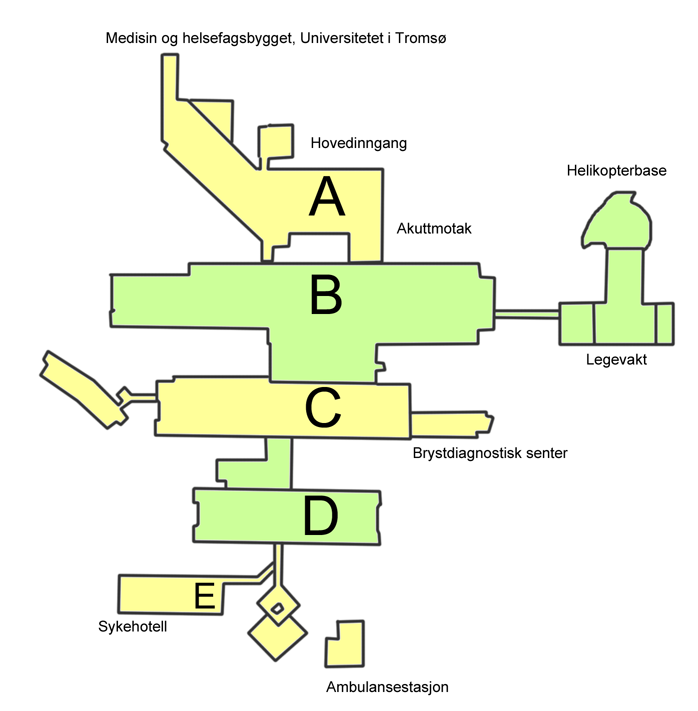
Map of the university hospital, indicating the location of the heliport, marked "helikopterbase"

The Ministry of Health and Social Affairs appointed a commission which in 1986 recommended that a national state-funded helicopter ambulance service be established. Tromsø was selected as one of eight bases. Along with Brønnøysund Airport, it was one of only two such bases in Northern Norway. However, it was flanked by the 330 Squadron's Westland Sea King bases at Bodø and Banak.

A 1996 report which studied the 360 missions the previous two years concluded with that only one in ten missions were actually of medical use and recommended a reduction in the use of the helicopter. For a week in May 1999 the Royal Norwegian Air Force dispatched a Bell 214 helicopter at the hospital after the ordinary helicopter was being repaired and before a reserve helicopter could be placed into service.

== Facilities ==
The heliport is situated on the premises of Tromsø University Hospital, situated north of the city center of Tromsø on the island of Tromsøya. The facility is owned and operated by the University Hospital of North Norway, part of Northern Norway Regional Health Authority. The helipad is placed on top of the building complex used by the helicopter, along with a hangar. The helipad has a diameter of 33.6 meters (110 ft) and capable of handling helicopters up to 16 tonnes. From the helipad there is a skywalk across to the emergency department of the hospital.

== Operations ==
The ambulance helicopter is operated by Norwegian Air Ambulance on contract with the National Air Ambulance Service. They have an AgustaWestland AW139 stationed at the heliport. The helicopter has room for a crew of three, consisting of a pilot, HEMS Technical Crew Member and an anesthesiologist, as well as two stretchers. Medical staff are provided by the University Hospital of North Norway. The helicopter flew 844 missions lasting 675 hours in 2019. From 2005 to 2011 the base was used an average 53 times annually by the Sea King rescue helicopters.

The Tromsø base is by far the helicopter ambulance base in the country which responds to the most avalanches. Because of this the helicopter has a heat-seeking camera used for correlated search and rescue missions.
