= Anna Bågenholm =

Swedish radiologist (born 1970)

- Born: Anna Elisabeth Johansson Bågenholm; 1970 (age 55–56); Vänersborg, Sweden
- Occupation: Radiologist
- Known for: Lowest survived body temperature ever recorded in an adult with accidental hypothermia
- Partner: Torvind Næsheim

Anna Elisabeth Johansson Bågenholm (born 1970) is a Swedish radiologist from Vänersborg, who survived after a skiing accident in 1999 left her trapped under a layer of ice for 80 minutes in freezing water. During this time she experienced extreme hypothermia and her body temperature decreased to 13.7 °C (56.7 °F), one of the lowest survived body temperatures ever recorded in a human with accidental hypothermia. Bågenholm was able to find an air pocket under the ice, but experienced circulatory arrest after 40 minutes in the water.

After rescue, Bågenholm was transported by helicopter to the Tromsø University Hospital, where a team of more than a hundred doctors and nurses worked in shifts for nine hours to save her life. Bågenholm woke up ten days after the accident, paralyzed from the neck down and subsequently spent two months recovering in an intensive care unit. Although she has made an almost full recovery from the incident, late in 2009 she was still having minor symptoms in hands and feet related to nerve injury. Bågenholm's case has been discussed in the leading British medical journal The Lancet, and in medical textbooks.

== Background and incident ==
Anna Bågenholm was born in 1970 in Vänersborg, Sweden, one of eight children. At the time of the incident, she was 29 years old and studying to become an orthopedic surgeon. Bågenholm decided to do her residency in Narvik, Norway, and, in May 1998, she became an assistant surgeon at the Narvik Hospital. Bågenholm's mentor during this period was Yngve Jones, a doctor at the Narvik Hospital who was about to celebrate his retirement with a party on 20 May 1999.

On that day, Bågenholm was skiing in the mountains outside of Narvik with two of her colleagues, Marie Falkenberg and Torvind Næsheim. An expert skier, Bågenholm often skied after work. As she was heading down a steep mountainside—a route she had taken several times before—she lost control of her skis. She fell headfirst onto a layer of ice on a frozen stream near a waterfall, landing on her back. A hole opened up in the ice and Bågenholm's head and torso were pulled in as meltwater filled her clothes. Her body became trapped under the ice, which was 20 centimetres (7.9 in) thick. When Falkenberg and Næsheim found Bågenholm, only her feet and skis were above the ice.

== Rescue attempts ==
Bågenholm's colleagues made an attempt to free her but failed. At 18:27 local time (CET), seven minutes after she had fallen into the water, they called for help on a mobile phone. Police lieutenant Bård Mikalsen received the call and put together two rescue teams; one at the top of the mountain and one at the bottom. Mikalsen also contacted the Bodø rescue team, which was equipped with a Sea King helicopter, but they told him that the helicopter had left to transport a sick child. Mikalsen was persistent and convinced the dispatcher to turn the helicopter around.

Falkenberg and Næsheim held onto Bågenholm's skis as they waited for the rescue teams to arrive. At first Bågenholm struggled in the cold water before she found an air pocket and was able to remain conscious for 40 minutes before experiencing circulatory arrest. Ketil Singstad led the rescue team from the top of the mountain. He skied as fast as he could to Bågenholm's location, where he and his rescue team tried unsuccessfully to pull her out with a rope. They then tried to dig her out, but their snow shovel could not break through the ice. Rescuers from the bottom of the mountain then arrived, bringing with them a pointed gardening shovel. They were able to cut a hole in the ice, and pulled her through at 19:40. Bågenholm had been in the water for 80 minutes when she was rescued.

== Resuscitation and recovery ==
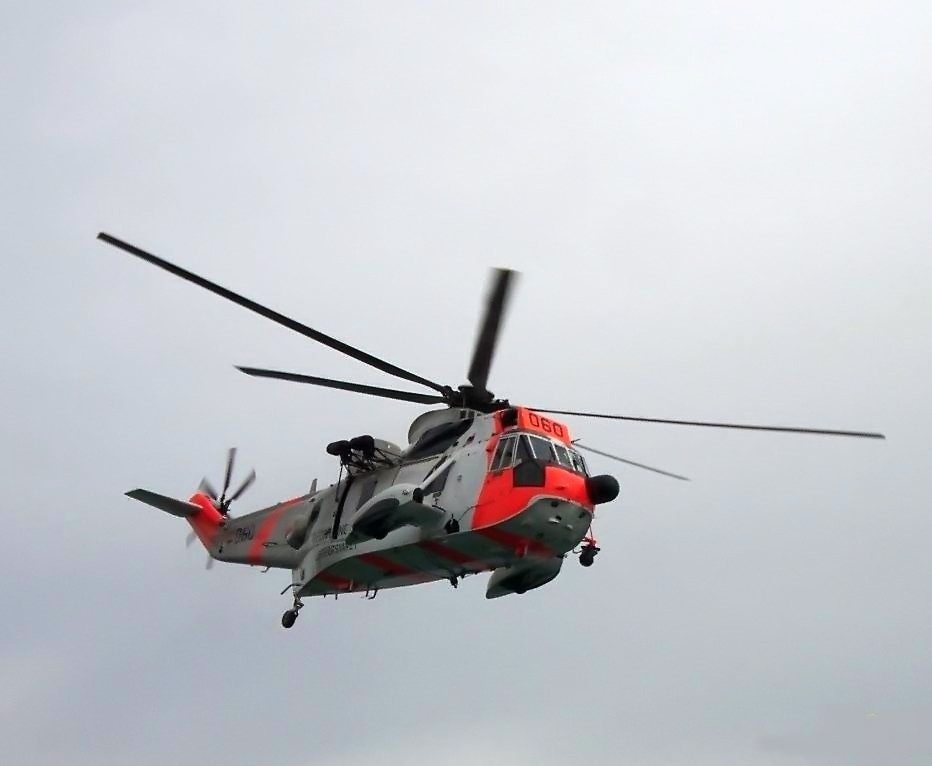
A Sea King helicopter brought Bågenholm to the Tromsø University Hospital.

When Bågenholm was pulled out of the water, her pupils were dilated, her blood was not circulating, and she was not breathing. Falkenberg and Næsheim, both doctors, began giving her cardiopulmonary resuscitation (CPR). The rescue helicopter soon arrived and Bågenholm was taken to the Tromsø University Hospital in an hour. The helicopter emergency team continued to give her CPR during the flight, and she was ventilated with oxygen. She was also treated with a defibrillator, but to no effect.

Bågenholm arrived at the hospital at 21:10. Her body temperature at this point was 13.7 °C (56.7 °F), the lowest survived body temperature ever recorded in a human with accidental hypothermia at the time. Dr. Mads Gilbert, an anesthesiologist and the chief of the hospital's emergency room, proceeded with the resuscitation attempt. He commented on Bågenholm's state: "She has completely dilated pupils. She is ashen, flaxen white. She's wet. She's ice cold when I touch her skin, and she looks absolutely dead." Gilbert had treated many cases of hypothermia before because of the cold climate in Norway, and knew how to treat Bågenholm. The electrocardiogram connected to her showed no signs of life, but Gilbert knew patients should be "warmed up before you declare them dead". He and his team hoped Bågenholm's brain had received enough oxygen from the CPR she was given after her rescue.

Bågenholm was taken to the operating theatre, where a team of more than a hundred doctors and nurses worked in shifts for nine hours to save her life. At 21:40, she was connected to a cardiopulmonary bypass machine that warmed up her blood outside of her body before it was reinserted into her veins. Bågenholm's first heart beat was recorded at 22:15, and her body temperature had risen to 36.4 °C (97.5 °F) at 0:49. She had no heart beat for 2 hours 35 minutes, from 19:40 till 22:15. Bågenholm's lung function deteriorated at 02:20, and she spent the following 35 days connected to a ventilator.

Bågenholm soon began to show signs of vitality, and woke up paralyzed from the neck down on 30 May. She feared she would spend the rest of her life on her back, and was angry with her colleagues for saving her. Bågenholm soon recovered from the paralysis, however, and later apologized to her friends; "I was very irritated when I realized they had saved me. I feared a meaningless life, without any dignity. Now I am very happy to be alive and want to apologize." Bågenholm's kidneys and digestive system were not working properly, so she had to recover in an intensive care unit for two more months. After spending 28 days in the Tromsø intensive care unit, she was flown to Sweden in an ambulance helicopter for the remainder of her recovery.

Dr Petter Andreas Steen, professor at the National Hospital in Oslo, said it was "an extraordinary medical achievement" that Bågenholm's life could be saved. He believed the reason she was able to recover was that her metabolism slowed down during the incident and the tissues inside her body required less oxygen at the low temperatures. According to the journal Proto (published by the Massachusetts General Hospital), Bågenholm's metabolism slowed down to ten percent of its baseline rate and thus she barely needed any oxygen at all.

== Aftermath ==
Despite the severe damage to Bågenholm's body, no permanent brain damage was diagnosed. Gilbert commented on this: "Her body had time to cool down completely before the heart stopped. Her brain was so cold when the heart stopped that the brain cells needed very little oxygen, so the brain could survive for quite a prolonged time." Gilbert also noted that therapeutic hypothermia, a method used to save those in circulatory arrest by lowering their body temperature, has become more frequent at Norwegian hospitals after Bågenholm's case gained fame.

Bågenholm returned to work in October 1999. On 7 October 1999–140 days after the accident—she returned to the hospital in Tromsø and met the doctors and nurses that helped save her life. Bågenholm commented: "When you are a patient, you're not thinking you are going to die. You think, I'm going to make it. But as a medical person, I think it's amazing that I'm alive." As of October 2009, Bågenholm has made an almost full recovery, although minor symptoms in hands and feet related to nerve injury remain. In late 2009, she was working as a radiologist at the hospital where her life was saved.

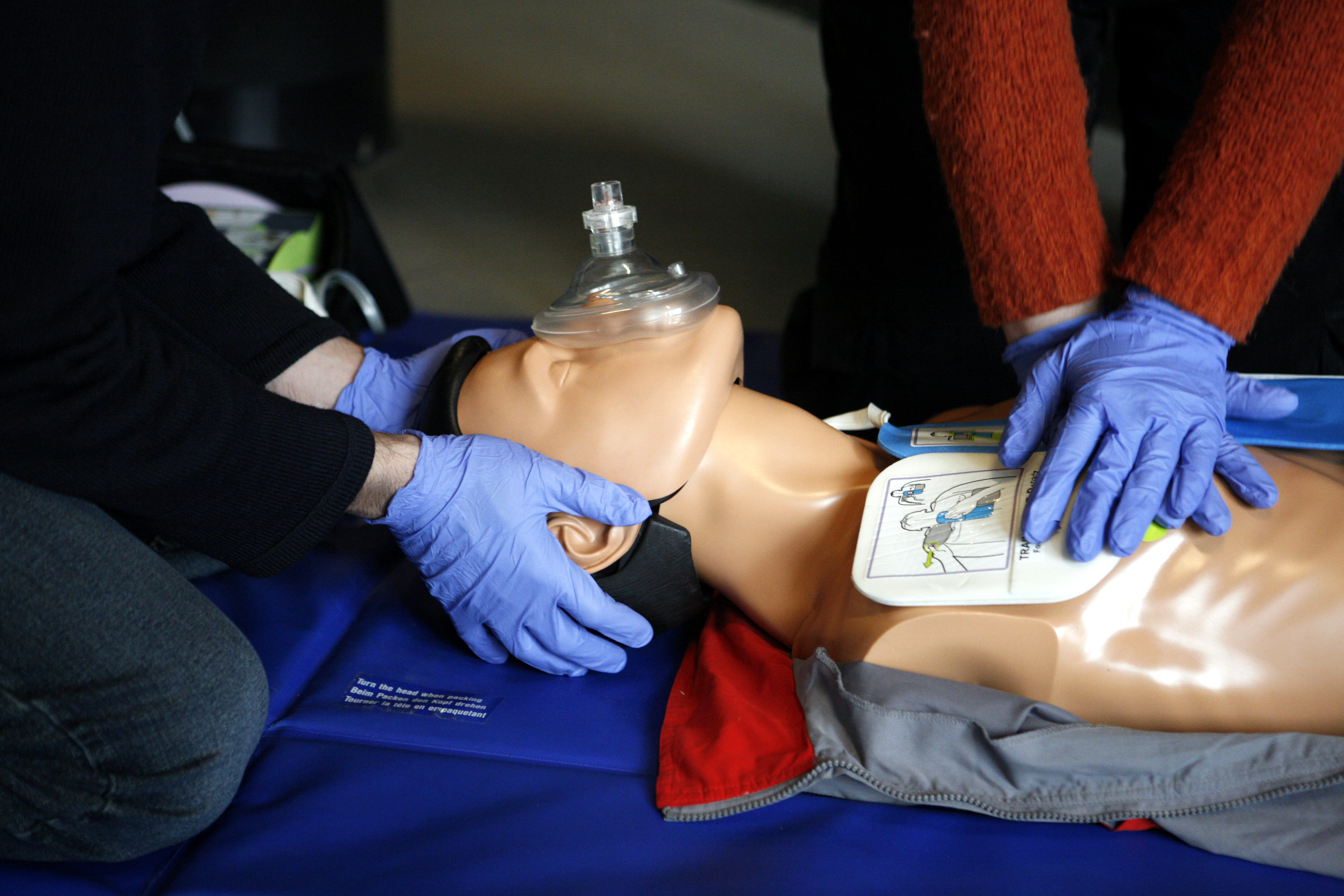
Gilbert said vigorous CPR plays an important role in the rescuing of victims of accidental hypothermia with circulatory arrest.

According to BBC News, most patients who have extreme hypothermia die, even if doctors are able to restart their hearts. The survival rate for adults whose body temperature has decreased to below 28 °C (82 °F) is 10%–33%. Prior to Bågenholm's accident, the lowest survived body temperature was 14.4 °C (57.9 °F), which had been recorded in a child. Gilbert said

"victims of very deep accidental hypothermia with circulatory arrest should be seen as potentially resuscitable with a prospect of full recovery. The key success factors of such marginal resuscitation efforts are early bystander actions with vigorous CPR and early warning of the emergency system, early dispatch of adequate rescue units (ground and air-ambulances) and good co-ordination between the resources outside and inside the hospital, aggressive rewarming and a spirit not to give up."

General practitioner Jel Coward from Tywyn, Wales, said persons who experience extreme hypothermia are often mistakenly thought dead because it can be difficult to detect a pulse on them. He said this case "really does bring it home to us how cautious one has to be before diagnosing death in people who are cold."

After the incident, Bågenholm became a subject of fiction and medical textbooks, and her case has been discussed in the leading British medical journal The Lancet. On 25 October 2009 her story was featured on CNN's television program Another Day: Cheating Death. Hosted by Sanjay Gupta, the program features stories from people who have survived severe conditions against all odds. Bågenholm hoped the program would give the people watching it more knowledge of hypothermia. The story is also included in Gupta's companion book, Cheating Death: The Doctors and Medical Miracles that Are Saving Lives Against All Odds. On 30 October 2009, Bågenholm and Gilbert appeared together on the popular Norwegian NRK talk show Skavlan, hosted by Fredrik Skavlan.

== See also ==
- Therapeutic hypothermia
