= Mads Gilbert =

Norwegian physician and activist (born 1947)

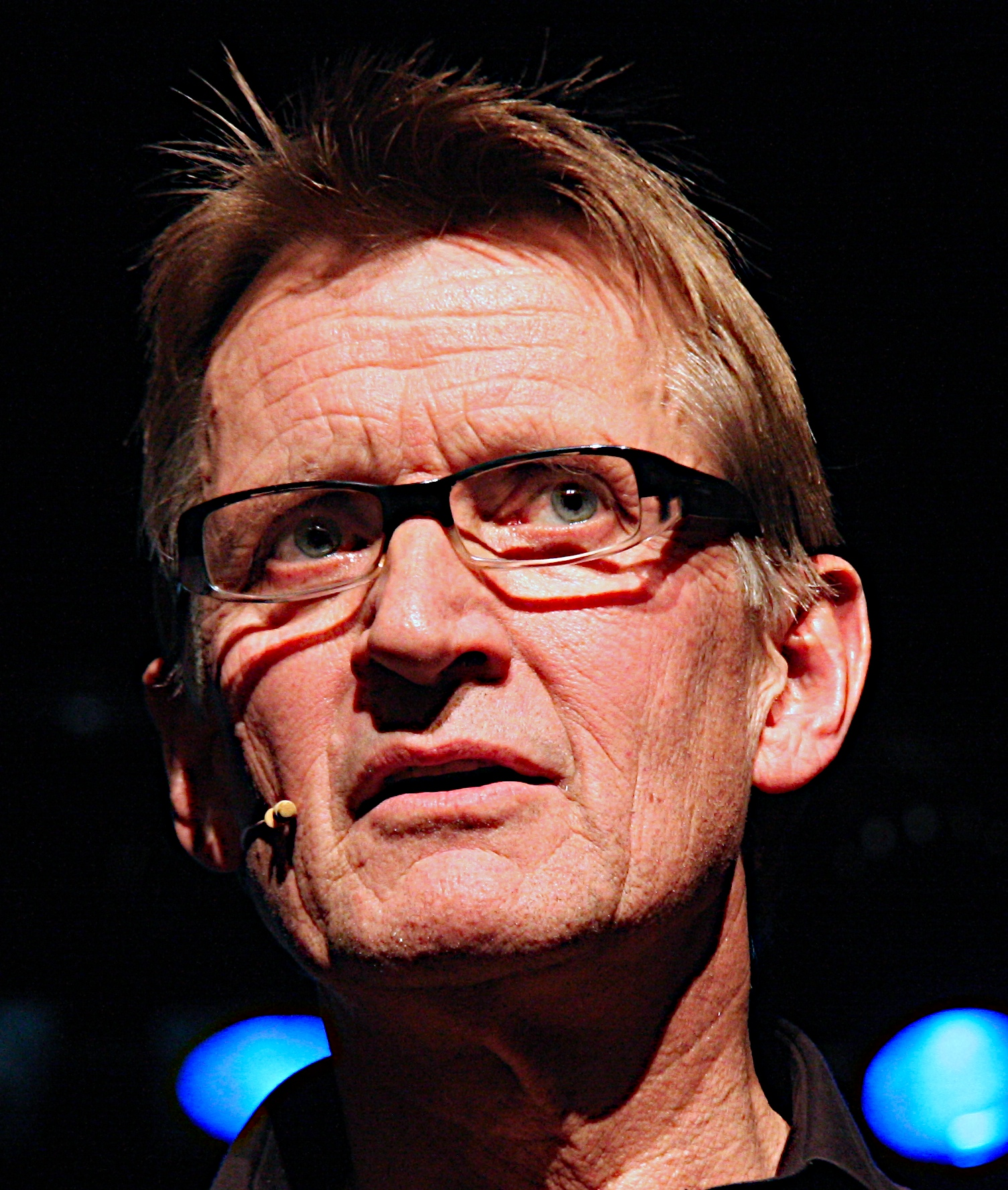
Mads Gilbert in 2009

Mads Fredrik Gilbert (born 2 June 1947) is a Norwegian physician, humanitarian, activist, and politician for the Red Party. He is a specialist in anesthesiology and head of the emergency medicine department at the University Hospital of North Norway and Professor of emergency medicine at the University of Tromsø.

Gilbert has a broad range of experience from international humanitarian work, especially in locations where medical and political issues merge. Since the 1970s, he has been actively involved with solidarity work concerning Palestinians, and he has served as a doctor for several periods in the Palestinian territories and Lebanon for NORWAC. His efforts have been central to leading the city of Tromsø, since 2001 a twin town of Gaza, to claim to be the city that has sent more health workers to the Palestinian territories than any other in the world. His book on the Gaza War, Eyes on Gaza (2009), has been translated into several languages. Gilbert has been lauded as a "hero" in Norwegian media for his work in Gaza; his humanitarian work has been hailed by Prime Ministers Kåre Willoch, Jens Stoltenberg and Erna Solberg, and Foreign Minister Jonas Gahr Støre. On 6 May 2013, King Harald V appointed Gilbert as a Commander of the Order of St. Olav for his "wide-ranging services to emergency medicine." He has also done volunteer work at a kibbutz.

Gilbert has been the subject of controversy for his political activism. In November 2014, it was announced that Israel had indefinitely banned Gilbert from entering Gaza, officially for security reasons. The decision sparked outrage and the Norwegian government subsequently requested that the decision be reversed. The Israeli Foreign Ministry later clarified that the ban regarded setting foot in Israel, not Gaza. Israel, Haaretz wrote, is the only available transit point for entering the Gaza Strip when the Rafah border from Egypt is closed.

== Early life and education ==
Gilbert was born on 2 June 1947 in Porsgrunn, Telemark, to a family of French Huguenot ancestry. His father Mads Fredrik Gilbert was an electrician, while his mother was a nurse. His family soon relocated to his grandmother's one-bedroom apartment in Oslo and he grew up in the borough of Majorstua until the age of 10 and later in Lambertseter. In the mid-1960s he enrolled in the Oslo Cathedral School. After finishing high school, he briefly studied veterinary medicine, however, he switched to general medicine following an accident involving his younger brother. He graduated from the University of Oslo in 1973.

He describes growing up in a "very political household" with many political discussions. He describes his parents as well-informed about the world and his father specifically as very well-read. He describes his mother as an inspiration, who taught him to think critically and be aware about siding with the weak.

== Political career ==
Gilbert's political activism was sparked by the Vietnam War, and he initially became a member of the Solidarity Committee for Vietnam (Solkom). He later joined the Marxist-Leninist SUF(m-l) and the Maoist AKP(m-l), and was an active member (the latter party only accepted "active membership") during the 1970s.

He is a member of the Red Party, and has represented its direct predecessor, the Red Electoral Alliance, the electoral front of the AKP(m-l) in the Troms county council for three terms, from 1979 to 1987 (two terms), and from 1995 to 1999.

== Medical career ==
Since 1976, he has mainly worked at the anaesthesiology department at the hospital in Tromsø, the current University Hospital of North Norway (UNN). For a while he worked at Gravdal hospital in Lofoten. He did research at the University of Iowa in Iowa City, and received the Dr. Med. doctoral degree at the University of Tromsø in 1991 for a thesis on metabolism and blood circulation during anaesthesia. He became Professor of emergency medicine at the University of Tromsø and head of the emergency medicine department at the University Hospital of North Norway in 1995.

=== The Bågenholm case ===
Following a skiing accident in May 1999, Anna Bågenholm was trapped for more than an hour in icy waters and was pronounced clinically dead, but survived after the resuscitation efforts of Gilbert and his team at the University Hospital of North Norway. Her body temperature was 13.7 °C, which represented the lowest survived body temperature recorded as of 2017. Gilbert was awarded Årets nordlending 2000 ("Northern Norwegian of the year, 2000", by the readership of the Tromsø newspaper Nordlys. Gilbert's breakthrough in treating extreme hypothermia has been chronicled in Cheating death : the doctors and medical miracles that are saving lives against all odds by Sanjay Gupta, as well as being featured in CNN's television program Another Day: Cheating Death. In 2013, Gilbert was made a commander of the Order of St. Olav for his overall contributions to emergency medicine.

== Work in the Gaza Strip ==
=== Gaza War ===
Gilbert arrived on emergency assignment for the Norwegian Aid Committee (NORWAC) with the surgeon Erik Fosse to support the humanitarian effort at al-Shifa Hospital during the 2008–2009 Israel–Gaza conflict, a period when Israel barred foreign journalists from entering the Gaza Strip. As international media reported from outside the conflict zone, Gilbert maintained frequent contact with Norwegian media, as well as segments of the world press, including CNN, BBC, ABC and Al Jazeera.

Following a grenade strike to a Gaza City vegetable market on 3 January, Gilbert sent an SMS text to his Norwegian and international contacts, with an appeal for all who read it to pass it on.

From doctor Mads Gilbert in Gaza: Thanks for your support. They bombed the central vegetable market in Gaza city two hours ago. 80 injured, 20 killed. All came here to Shifa. Hades! We wade in death, blood and amputees. Many children. Pregnant woman. I have never experienced anything this horrible. Now we hear tanks. Tell it, pass it on, shout it. Anything. DO SOMETHING! DO MORE! We're living in the history books now, all of us!

— Mads G, 3.1.09 13:50, Gaza, Palestine.

The ensuing response sparked reports of Gilbert's message on a global scale, and scores of declarations of support to the Norwegian Palestine Committee.

Asked about this incident in an interview with Al Jazeera, Gilbert said: "people in Gaza must know that they are not on their own, many people are with them, although we are not there but we are with them and they must not give up, for the people of the free world ponder on your patience and inspire from your strength. If you give up then the people behind you will give up..."

On 5 January, after 10 days of the Israeli heavy air bombardment on Gaza strip, BBC news reporter Rushdi Abu Alouf in Gaza interviewed Gilbert on the situation inside Gaza's Al-Shifa Hospital. Gilbert stated that an overwhelming majority of the casualties he had treated were civilians, and women and children alone made up 25% of the death toll, and 45% of the wounded.

On 8 January 2009, while in Gaza, Mads Gilbert was in a video which appeared on CNN which showed the brother of a Palestinian TV producer dying while Gilbert and another doctor worked to save him. This video became subject to controversy and accusations that the scene was staged. World News and Features, the camera crew's employer, and the producer himself denounced the allegations. CNN also stated on their web site that they stand by the video. Two weeks later, the CNN published a video report on their website refuting the bloggers' allegations point by point. Two independent doctors who were shown the video said that they had no doubt that the hospital scene and Gilbert's work was genuine.

==== Reception in Norway ====
The doctors were "received as heroes" by the Norwegian public, and received praise from commentators from most of the mainstream political spectrum for their work during the Gaza War. On 11 January 2009, Prime Minister (now NATO Secretary-General) Jens Stoltenberg stated that he had called Gilbert and Fosse to "thank them and recognize the work they have done to alleviate the suffering of the people of Gaza since 31 December last year. They have not only taken on a difficult medical mission, but have also demonstrated great personal courage and compassion. They have been a voice to the world. The Government supports the work of the doctors and their organization. We will continue to support this important work."

Labour Party Foreign Minister Jonas Gahr Støre and former conservative Prime Minister Kåre Willoch both wrote endorsements for Gilbert and Fosse's 2009 book Eyes in Gaza; Kåre Willoch wrote that "Israel held journalists away while subjecting the people of Gaza to unfathomable suffering. But two Norwegian doctors were there. Their powerful narration throws a powerful spotlight on a brutality which also damages Israel, and impedes peace."

Among critics were the right-wing Norwegian Progress Party leader Siv Jensen who described Gilbert as a "local politician from Rødt [Red Party]", criticizing that he has been permitted without censorship to act as a voice of "anti-Israel propaganda." Foreign Minister Jonas Gahr Støre condemned Jensen's attack against Gilbert and Fosse, calling it a "disgrace" and stating that Gilbert and Fosse "have shown great courage and acted in accordance with the best medical traditions, namely by helping the oppressed." Jensen was also criticized of hypocrisy and of supporting Israeli terror against Palestinians by former government minister Audun Lysbakken. Conservative Party leader Erna Solberg and Liberal Party leader Lars Sponheim also criticized Jensen; Erna Solberg lauded Gilbert and Fosse for "saving lives."

==== Aftermath ====
In the period that followed Gilbert and Fosse's extraction from Gaza, they continued to be covered in Norwegian and international media. In an open letter to the medical journal The Lancet, Gilbert and Fosse described the Gaza situation as a "nightmarish havoc", stating that they had "witnessed the most horrific war injuries in men, women and children of all ages in numbers almost too large to comprehend". Later on the Lancet editor in chief Prof Richard Horton distanced himself from two of the co-signers.

Israeli Foreign Ministry spokesman Yigal Palmor responded to the Lancet report by criticizing Gilbert for "spreading vicious lies", adding "It is a pity that serious members of the medical profession should allow themselves to be dragged into an excessive of mad Mads". Gilbert rejected Palmor's remarks and stated "If Israel think we are lying, they can just open the borders and let the world's press into Gaza. Then one will soon find out who is lying."

In 2009 he received the Fritt Ord Honorary Award together with Erik Fosse.

=== Operation Pillar of Defence ===
During Operation Pillar of Defence, Mads Gilbert returned to Gaza and the al-Shifa hospital. The night between 20 and 21 November 2012, he wrote this report. A cease-fire was declared at 8 PM the same day.

== Controversies ==
=== Opinion on 11 September attacks ===
In a statement made to Dagbladet in the wake of the September 11 attacks Gilbert stated: "The attack on New York did not come as a surprise with the politics the West has followed the last decades. I am upset by the terrorist attack, but I am at least as upset over the suffering that the US has caused. It is in this context that 5000 dead has to be seen. If the U.S. government has a legitimate right to bomb and kill civilians in Iraq, the oppressed has a moral right to attack the U.S. with the weapons they may create as well. Dead civilians are the same whether they are Americans, Palestinians or Iraqis." When asked if he supported a terrorist attack against the US he answered: "Terror is a poor weapon, but my answer is yes, within the context I have mentioned."

The incident was described by Nordlys editor Hans Kristian Amundsen as "probably the stupidest thing he's ever done", citing it as proof that Gilbert is a "hopeless politician". In an interview with the Norwegian news agency NTB in 2009, Gilbert described his own statements in the aftermath of 9/11 as "unwise and ill-considered", stressing that he is completely against terror against civilians.

=== 2014 Israeli ban on entering the Gaza Strip ===
Citing "security reasons", Israel reportedly imposed a lifetime ban on Gilbert, who has treated casualties in Shifa hospital for 30 years, from entering Israel and from this reason entering the Gaza Strip from the Israeli border after the publication of an open letter in The Lancet, undersigned by 24 doctors and scientists including Gilbert, which alleged that Israel was adopting the rhetoric of a national emergency to carry out a massacre of Palestinians, especially targeting women and children during the 2014 Israel–Gaza conflict. Later on The Lancet editor in chief Richard Horton said he regretted publishing the letter.

In 2014, the Israeli intelligence service alleged that Gilbert had contact with "high-ranking representatives of Hamas" and that it had banned him from entering Gaza.

The decision by the Israeli government sparked outrage in Norway and an official protest by the Norwegian government. On behalf of the government, Under-Secretary of State in the Foreign Ministry Bård Glad Pedersen said that "Gilbert has for many years played an important role in assisting the Palestinian health care system, and his travels to Gaza are vital to continue this work." The Labour Party secretary Raymond Johansen said that "Israel's punishment of medical staff who make a vital contribution in a war situation seems like a desperate act."

The Israeli government later said that the ban imposed on Gilbert was not necessarily permanent and did not apply to the Gaza Strip, but only to Israel, where it regarded his presence as a security problem. Given the Egyptian closure of the Rafah passage, the only way to access the Gaza Strip is via an Israeli point of entry, the Israeli newspaper Haaretz commented. Emmanuel Nachson, spokesperson for the Israeli Foreign Ministry, however claimed that Gilbert was "welcome in Israel", contradicting other claims by Israel. He also denied reports that Gilbert was banned for life from Gaza, saying it was "not permanent".

=== Boycott of Médecins Sans Frontières ===
Gilbert criticized and encouraged people to boycott Médecins Sans Frontières in 2006 for not taking a position on conflicts, saying he would "not give a dime" to the annual Norwegian TV-aksjonen, a national collection charity of the state broadcaster NRK.

Previously, in 2001, the leader of the Norwegian branch of Médecins Sans Frontières had sharply criticised Gilbert for voicing support to the 11 September terror attacks, stating that doctors with "such attitudes" could "never become a member of the organisation". On being a doctor as well as a politician, Gilbert has said the two roles are indistinguishable, and that "there is little in medicine that isn't politics".

Gilbert also worked against the training of new Norwegian medical personnel assigned to the ISAF forces in Afghanistan. His activism resulted in the ceasing of training of medical personnel at his medical department, and a following shortfall of qualified doctors in both the Norwegian military force and humanitarian effort in Afghanistan.

=== Speech in South Africa ===
In a speech held in South Africa, Gilbert drew criticism for his statements on the 2023 Hamas-led attack on Israel. He described the Hamas forces as brave: "That is what happened when the Palestinian resistance broke out of Gaza and attacked the occupier on his own ground. They all ran away because they could not face a real fight between soldiers face to face. They only manage remote warfare—in a tank, in a jet fighter, in a drone control room, or at a distance. Meanwhile, the Palestinian resistance, which I support, is brave, and they meet the enemy on the ground, man to man".

== Personal life ==
Since 1974, Gilbert lives in Tromsø. He explained that upon first seeing the town, he felt "intensely" that he had come home.

He is unmarried and has two daughters. He enjoys kayaking during the summer, and mountaineering during the winter, with the Lyngen Alps his favourite peaks. He describes himself as a "practising agnostic, with a recurring need for prayer".

== Publications ==
Mads Gilbert and Erik Fosse have written a book called Eyes in Gaza, which is an account of their time in Gaza.

== Awards ==
- Lærdal Award in Emergency Medicine (1999) (with Hans Husum)
- Named "Northern Norwegian of the Year" by Nordlys (2000 and 2009)
- Erik Bye Memorial Prize (2009)
- Fritt Ord Honorary Award (2009)
- Press Photographers' Award (2009)
- Tahiti Prize (2009) (with Erik Fosse)
- Græsrode Prize (2009) (with Erik Fosse)
- Named "Man of the Year" by the magazine Mann (2009) (with Erik Fosse)
- Troms Physician of the Year (2010)
- Veslebakken Prize (2010) (with Erik Fosse)
- Commander of the Order of St. Olav (2013)
- Hamdan Award for Volunteers in Humanitarian Medical Services (2013–14)
