= Erik Fosse =

Norwegian physician (born 1950)

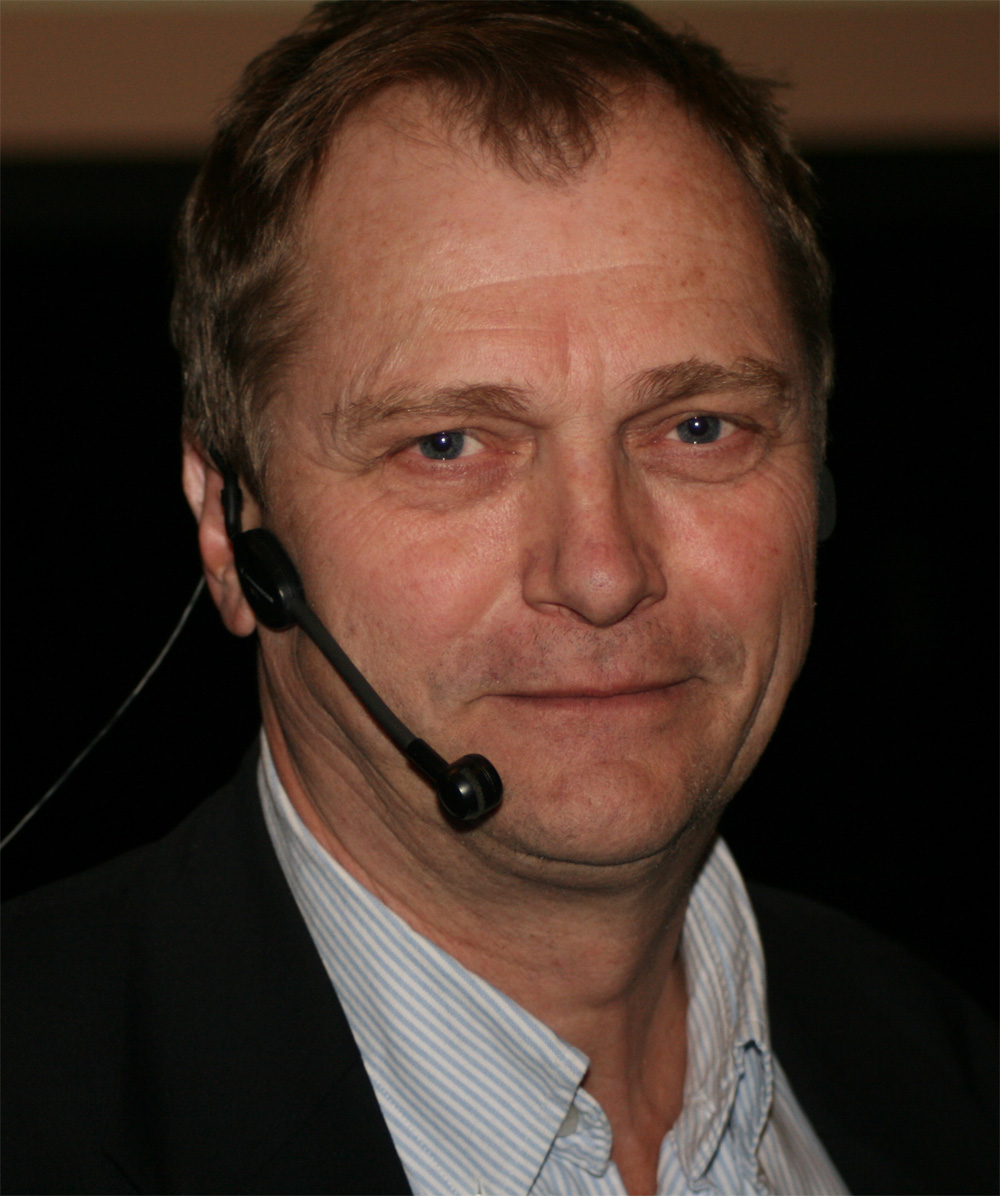
Erik Fosse

Erik Torgeir Fosse (born 2 December 1950) is a Norwegian surgeon, lieutenant colonel, political activist, solidarity worker and musician. As professor of medicine he has headed the Intervention Centre at the National Hospital since 1995. He has been involved in international medical solidarity work since 1979 and co-founded the Norwegian Aid Committee NORWAC in 1983, of which he remains a leader. He is noted for his humanitarian work for NORWAC in the Gaza Strip with Mads Gilbert during the Gaza War.

== Education and early life ==
Erik Fosse started his medical studies in Madrid, but the university was closed after a student uprising in 1972, so he completed his degree at the University of Oslo, which included a 7-month placement in the northern fishing village of Gryllefjord. He got his M.D. (Ph.D.) degree in 1987 for a study on immunological abnormalities connected to trauma. His conscription in 1978 provided his first contact with Lebanon and the Middle East.

== Medical career ==
Fosse is a specialist of general surgery and cardiothoracic surgery. He has worked at the cardiothoracic departments of Ullevål University Hospital and the National Hospital. Since 1995, he has been the head of the intervention centre at the National Hospital, a research and development center for new technology in medical treatment. He was appointed Professor of Medicine (professor II, a part-time position) at the University of Oslo in 1999.

Fosse worked as advisor to the Surgeon General of Norway and as instructor in war surgery for the Norwegian Defence Joint Medical Services from 1991 to 2013. He obtained the rank of lieutenant-colonel. He represented Norway in the Human Factors and Medicine panel of the Research and Technology Organization in NATO for fifteen years, chairing it from 2011 to 2013.

From 1995 to 2021 Fosse headed the Intervention Center at Rikshospitalet, a research and testing department for new medical technology in medical treatment, noted for its ground-breaking interdisciplinary approach.

== International humanitarian work ==
Fosse worked as a surgeon for the Palestine Committee of Norway in Lebanon for the first time in 1979. After the 1982 Israeli invasion of Lebanon he co-founded the Norwegian Aid Committee, NORWAC, in 1983.

He worked as a surgeon for the Norwegian Afghanistan Committee in Afghanistan for three months in 1986 during the Soviet occupation. In 1999, he worked in the Balkans where NORWAC set up a field hospital in Krumë, serving Albanian soldiers and civilians. The hospital was protected by the Kosovo Liberation Army which had their headquarter in Krumë.

During the 2008–2009 Gaza War, Fosse and Mads Gilbert worked at the Al-Shifa Hospital from January, and were in the initial week the only western observers of the Israeli attack who reported to the international media. In 2010 they published a book together on their experiences, Eyes in Gaza.

From our arrival in Al-Shifa hospital in Gaza City on the afternoon of Dec 31, 2008, until this morning, we have witnessed the most horrific war injuries in men, women, and children of all ages in numbers almost too large to comprehend. The wounded, dying, and dead have streamed into the overcrowded hospital in endless convoys of ambulances and private cars, and wrapped in blankets in the caring arms of others.

During the war in Gaza in 2014, Fosse again worked as a surgeon at the Shifa hospital on a mission for NORWAC.

== Political opinions ==
Fosse says his interest for the Palestinian cause started when he was a student in Madrid and met many fellow Arab students.

Fosse stated in relation to aid work in Kosovo that he thinks it is often unrealistic and wrong for aid organizations to be impartial, and that aid workers to get things done may need to take side and co-operate with political representatives of that side.

Fosse has also been involved in the debate over the hospital structure in Norway, and has advocated more centralization which he thinks high-tech and advanced medicine requires.

== Personal life ==
Fosse lives in Sagene with his partner Cathrine Krøger, and has two grown-up children. He plays in the band Sagene Ring and has released four albums on the Grappa label.

== Recognition and awards ==
For their reportage from Gaza, Fosse and Gilbert were given the Fritt Ord Honorary Award in 2009. In the same year, they received the Snill Gutt (Good Boy) Award. In 2010, Fosse and Gilbert received Vesleblakkenprisen for altruistic work from Rendalen Municipality.

In 2013, Fosse was appointed Commander of the Royal Order of St. Olav for his contributions in medicine and civic engagement.

== Publications ==
- (with Hans Husum & Swee Chai Ang) War Surgery: Field Manual (1995), Third World Network/Zed Books, ISBN 9781856493901
- Inside Gaza's Al-Shifa hospital, The Lancet, 17 January 2009
- (with Mads Gilbert) Eyes in Gaza (2010), Quartet Books Ltd, ISBN 9780704371910
- Med livet i hendene ("With life in your hands") (2013), Gyldendal Norsk Forlag, ISBN 9788205406964
- "The intervention center - a common toolbox" in Natvig, JB; Børdahl, PE; Larsen, Ø.; Swärd, ET (ed.): De tre Riker Rikshospitalet 1826-2001 (ISBN 8205301034) Gyldendal academic (2001), pp. 290-298
