= Al-Shifa Hospital =

Hospital in Gaza Strip, Palestine

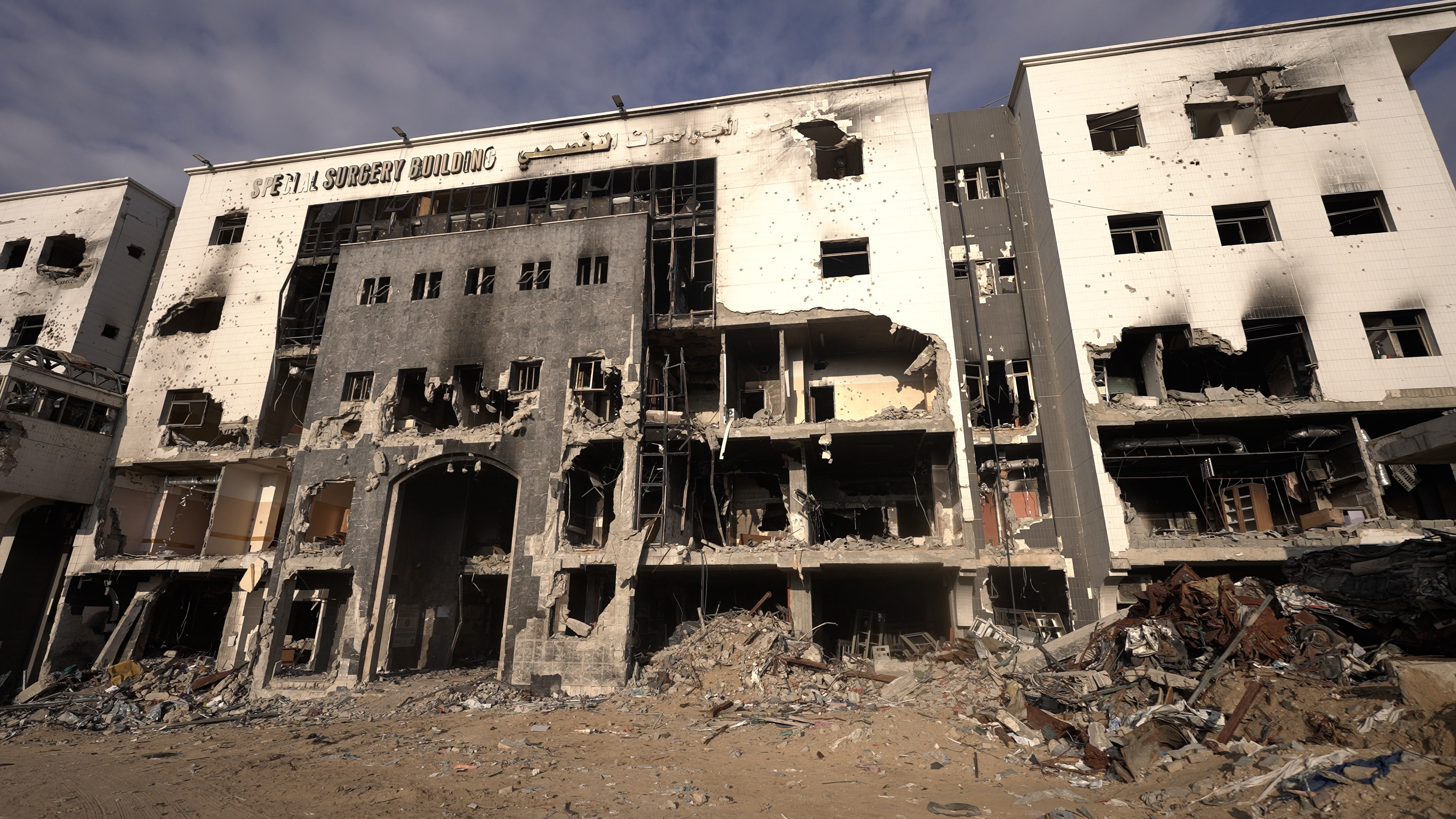
- Al-Shifa Hospital destroyed by the Israeli army, 15 April 2025

Geography
- Location: Gaza, Gaza Governorate, Palestine
- Coordinates: 31°31′27″N 34°26′39″E

Organisation
- Care system: Internal medicine, surgery, pediatrics, ophthalmology, obstetrics, gynecology
- Type: Treatment

History
- Founded: 1946

Al-Shifa Hospital (Arabic: مستشفى الشفاء, romanized: Mustašfā aš-Šifāʾ [musˈtaʃ.fa aʃːiˈfaːʔ]) is the largest medical complex and central hospital in the Gaza Strip, Palestine, located in the neighborhood of northern Rimal in Gaza City. The hospital was first established by the government of Mandatory Palestine in 1946, and expanded during the Egyptian and later Israeli occupations.

During the Gaza war, Israel, supported by the United States, said Hamas was using the hospital as a command center and on 15 November 2023, its forces raided the hospital, where thousands of Palestinians were taking shelter. The Israeli raid was widely criticized and Israel was accused by several news outlets of waging a propaganda war. Medical staff at al-Shifa have accused Israel of directly causing the deaths of civilians being treated at al-Shifa, including prematurely born babies.

Following Israel's release of video evidence of Hamas tunnels under the hospital on 22 November, multiple news agencies concluded that the evidence did not demonstrate the use by Hamas of a command center. Amnesty International said on 23 November 2023 that "Amnesty International has so far not seen any credible evidence to support Israel's claim that al-Shifa is housing a military command centre" and that "the Israeli military has so far failed to provide credible evidence" for the allegation. Izzat al-Risheq, a Hamas official, denied that the group used the hospital as a shield for its underground military structures, saying there was no truth to the claims. A later report in February 2024 by the New York Times, confirmed the earlier reports but also cited classified Israeli intelligence material suggesting that Hamas did use the hospital as cover.

A second Israeli raid on the hospital, during which there were extensive gunfights in and around the hospital complex, ended on 1 April 2024 after two weeks. The hospital was completely destroyed with hundreds of casualties around the hospital. One of its medical units reopened on 1 September 2024.

== 1948–1967 ==
Dar al-Shifa, which means "house of healing" in Arabic, was originally a British Army barracks, but was transformed into a center to provide treatment for quarantine and febrile diseases by the government of the British Mandate of Palestine in 1946. Prior to the 1948 Arab–Israeli War, al-Shifa was one of two hospitals in Gaza, the other being al-Ahli Arab Hospital. When the Egyptians administered the Gaza Strip after the war, the quarantine and febrile diseases department was relocated to another area in the city, and al-Shifa developed into the central hospital of Gaza. Initially, a department for internal medicine was established, followed by a new wing for surgery, and subsequently new buildings for pediatrics and ophthalmology were added to the hospital.

After a brief occupation by Israel during the 1956 Suez Crisis, the returning Egyptian administration, under directives by president Gamal Abdel Nasser, paid more attention to the health and social situation of Gaza, and al-Shifa was expanded to include departments for obstetrics and gynecology. They established a new health administration for the Gaza region, later building several clinics throughout the city that were attended by doctors from the hospital. The largest department in al-Shifa was internal medicine (100 beds), then pediatrics (70 beds), surgery (50 beds), ophthalmology (20 beds) and gynecology (10 beds).

== 1967–2005: Israeli occupation until the Gaza disengagement ==
When Israel occupied Gaza in the 1967 Six-Day War, the entire Egyptian administration and staff in the hospital were taken prisoner. By 1969, the department of internal medicine grew to contain several sub-departments.

In December 1987, during the First Intifada, Israeli forces stormed the hospital on multiple occasions. They assaulted patients and staff, arrested people, and destroyed medical equipment. They injured at least 61 people and killed at least four Palestinians, including an 8-year-old child. Additionally, they used the roof of the hospital as an observation point. Palestinian youths threw bottles and stones at the soldiers. A few months later, a delegation of American doctors visited various healthcare sites in Palestine. They said that: "When compared with the lowest level of health services in some of the third world countries, the level of the services in Al-Shifa hospital, for example, was even lower."

=== Architecture and expansion ===
The hospital underwent a major Israeli renovation and expansion. The project was designed by Israeli architects Gershon Tzapor and Benjamin Edelson in their Tel Aviv office, both well experienced in the construction of high standard hospitals. The project was done in the 1980s as part of an effort to improve the living conditions of Gaza residents.

This project came as part of the Israeli idea of mutual existence between Jews and Arabs. The project intended to house 900 beds in the entire campus, a 50 dunam area. The Israeli additions were considered to be in the same standard as those hospital wings in Israeli hospitals such as Tel HaShomer. The architecture of the hospital came to reflect the modernist and post modernist trends in Israeli architecture. In particular was the similarity of the project to existing Israeli hospitals such as the facades of the Bezalel building in Jerusalem. Similarly to other Israeli projects, the building was built with sharpened diagonal staircases, akin to projects by Israeli architects Dan Eitan, Shlomit Nadler and others at the time.

During a renovation in the 1990s, a large basement was added, which the IDF later said was appropriated by Hamas and used to store weapons. According to Newsweek and the Intercept a bunker beneath building 2 was constructed in 1983 by Israel and "includes a secure underground operating room and tunnel network." According to former Israeli Prime Minister, Ehud Barak in an interview with CNN, the tunnels were built in the 1980s by Israel as part of the hospital's construction. According to Israeli officials, Hamas subsequently dug out the original basement, later adding new floors and connecting it as a hub within their existing tunnel system.

== 2005–present: Palestinian control ==
In 2005, Israel withdrew from Gaza and handed over control to the Palestinian Authority.

=== 2007 Fatah–Hamas conflict ===
During the Fatah–Hamas conflict in June 2007, Fatah and Hamas clashed at the hospital, killing one member of each organization. Some injured people brought to the hospital were killed by Hamas militants once inside. A doctor in the hospital reported, "The medical staff are suffering from fear and terror, particularly of the Hamas fighters, who are in every corner of the hospital." Hamas fired about 600 doctors affiliated with Fatah, threatening to shoot them if they returned to the hospital. Two Norwegian medical doctors, Erik Fosse and Mads Gilbert, have done humanitarian work at the hospital.

=== 2008–2009 war ===
During the Gaza war (2008–2009), Al-Shifa hospital overflowed with Palestinians injured by Israeli airstrikes. Already before the war, the blockade of Gaza had caused a shortage of ventilation systems, patient-handling systems such as operating tables, beds, trolleys, and various types of medical equipment. These shortages affected clinical work.

In the first 13 days of the war, about 360 surgical operations were performed. Among the people brought to the hospital, about 340 were pronounced dead on arrival. The number of injuries treated during this period was 1039, but this is regarded as an underestimate, since it doesn't include many patients with minor injuries.

Much of the media coverage of the 2008–2009 Israel–Gaza conflict was broadcast or written by correspondents reporting from the hospital.

During the 2008–2009 Gaza war, The New York Times reported that "armed Hamas militants in civilian clothes roved the halls" killing alleged collaborators. Several reports by Israeli Shin Bet officials alleged that Hamas used Al-Shifa hospital as a bunker and refuge, knowing it would be spared by air strikes. The Israeli allegations were difficult to confirm because Israel had banned reporters from Gaza at the time. PBS' Wide Angle programme, which interviewed a doctor from Gaza who preferred to remain anonymous, said that he believed that Hamas officials were present under the hospital.

In 2009, the Palestinian Health Ministry, run by the Palestinian Authority in the West Bank, accused Hamas members of taking control of wards in Shifa Hospital.

In 2013, a special surgical building was opened.

=== 2014 war ===
During the 2014 Gaza war, Israeli operations, initiated following Hamas kidnappings and attacks on Israeli civilians centers, killed more than 2,100 Palestinians and injured over 11,000. During the war, a total of 8,592 patients visited Al-Shifa hospital, mostly civilians. Of these, 490 (5.7%) were dead on arrival. After a detailed triage, 1808 patients were admitted, of whom 78 (4.3%) died in the hospital. 842 major life-saving surgeries were performed, including 90 laparotomies, 146 orthopaedic fixations, 106 craniotomies, 69 thoracotomies/airway interventions, 38 vascular procedures, 49 amputations, 68 debridements, and 176 other procedures.

Compared to the 2012 war, Intensive care unit (ICU) admission rates doubled and ICU mortality rates tripled. The authors speculate that might be due to the "extreme character" of the attacks in 2014.

Amnesty International stated that Hamas forces used the abandoned areas of the hospital to kill, detain, interrogate, torture and otherwise mistreat Palestinians accused of collaborating with Israel, in an operation that Hamas operatives called "Operation Strangling Necks". According to Amnesty, they did this while the hospital continued to function, and used the functioning hospital morgue to support the operation by dropping off bodies for families to collect. One member of Fatah described suffering two hours of torture at the hospitals outpatient clinic, during which he was beaten with a hammer.

During the war, Hamas officials would conduct hourly interviews with media from the hospital, condemning "Israeli aggression". Norman Finkelstein said the evidence for the accusation was weak, and if this happened it would have been noticed by the 13,000 people (including journalists) who were present at the hospital during the war.

Former Israeli Navy commander Eli Marom said Hamas leaders were hiding in basement of Al-Shifa hospital. Finkelstein writes that the official Israeli report of the war did not accuse Hamas of doing anything at the hospital more serious than "security service interrogations". Washington Post London bureau chief William Booth wrote for The Washington Post that the hospital had become a "de facto headquarters for Hamas leaders, who can be seen in the hallways and offices." Orde Kittrie described Shifa hospital as Hamas' headquarters. Hamas officials were also described as disguising themselves in medical attire within the hospital.

Dr. Erik Fosse, who worked at the hospital at the time, found no evidence that it was a Hamas base. Norwegian doctor Mads Gilbert, who also worked at the hospital during the war, rejected that the hospital was used a base by Hamas officials or militants. Professor Sara Roy concluded that "it was highly improbable that Hamas made military use of the hospital building".

Wall Street Journal correspondent Nick Casey tweeted a photo of Hamas MP and media spokesperson Mushir Al Masri conducting media interviews right outside of the Shifa hospital, but later deleted it. The Guardian journalists saw Hamas officials at the hospital. Reporting from the Gaza hospital to the Finnish newspaper Helsingin Sanomat, Aishi Zidan reported that a rocket was fired from the area of the hospital. This was seized upon by the Israeli press, prompting the journalist to take to Facebook to note that her words had been taken out of context and used as propaganda, and that the rocket had actually been fired from "somewhere behind the hospital".

== Gaza war ==
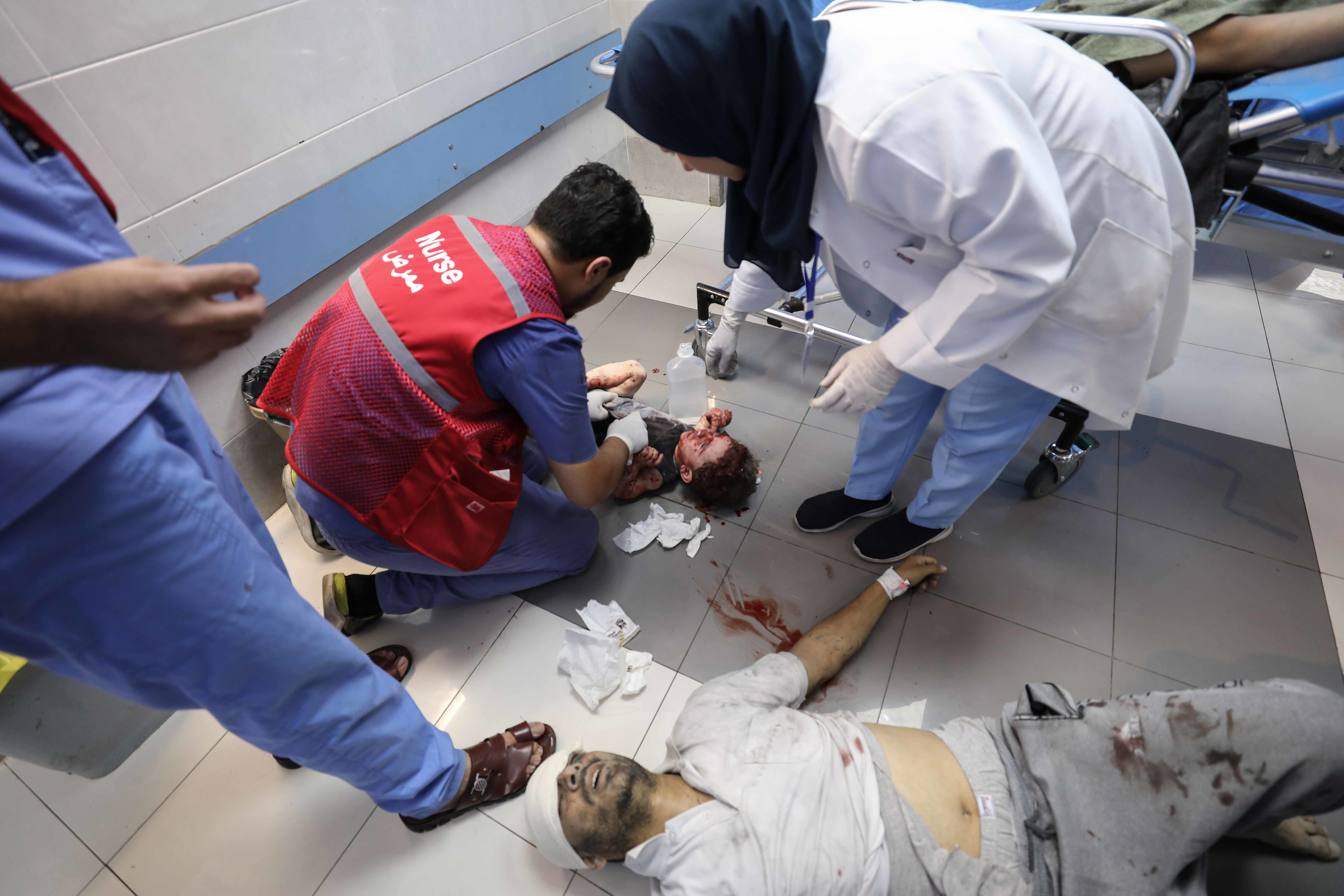
Wounded Palestinians receive treatment on the floor at the overcrowded emergency ward of Al-Shifa hospital in Gaza City on 11 October 2023

During the Gaza war beginning in 2023, hospital administrators at al-Shifa said the hospital was overwhelmed with wounded and dying people, operating well over its 700-bed capacity, and was running short on fuel, beds, and medical supplies. The hospital was also housing thousands of displaced Palestinians seeking shelter from airstrikes during the war.

On 7 October 2023, the day of the 2023 attack on Israel, Hamas brought two hostages, one of them wounded, to the hospital. The IDF claims that this demonstrates that Al-Shifa Hospital was used as a command and control center.

On 3 November, amid the Israeli invasion of the Gaza Strip, an Israeli airstrike hit an ambulance convoy, resulting in dozens of wounded and several deaths. According to Israel, the ambulances were being used to transport Hamas fighters and weapons, a charge Hamas denied. According to Gaza officials, the ambulances were transporting critical injured patients from the hospital to the Rafah crossing with Egypt. The Palestinian Red Crescent Society said the strike killed 15 people. UN Secretary-General Antonio Guterres said he was "horrified by the reported attack in Gaza on an ambulance convoy outside Al-Shifa hospital" while World Health Organization chief Tedros Adhanom Ghebreyesus said he was "utterly shocked". On 7 November, the Human Rights Watch determined that the strike was "apparently unlawful and should be investigated as a possible war crime", noting that ambulances and other medical transportation must be allowed to function and be protected in all circumstances". It added that the use of ambulances for military purposes would also be against the rules of war, but it had found no evidence of this. The Washington Post stated no weapons or individuals wearing military garb could be seen in videos it reviewed, and Human Rights Watch said it "did not find evidence that the ambulance was being used for military purposes".

On 6 November, Al Aqsa radio and Al Jazeera reported Israeli forces had struck and destroyed the solar panels atop of Al-Shifa Hospital, leaving the facility totally reliant on back-up generators powered by rapidly dwindling fuel supplies. The IDF denied targeting the systems. A report by Center for Strategic and International Studies on 11 November 2023 said that while the solar panels at the hospital appeared to be intact, solar panels adjacent to the hospital had been extensively damaged. A spokesperson of the center speculated that some of these panels may have also provided power to parts of the hospital which were located outside it´s main complex.

Israel stated that it offered to supply fuel and evacuate children from the hospital. On 11 November, the IDF announced that it would help transporting babies from the hospital to a safer one on 12 November.

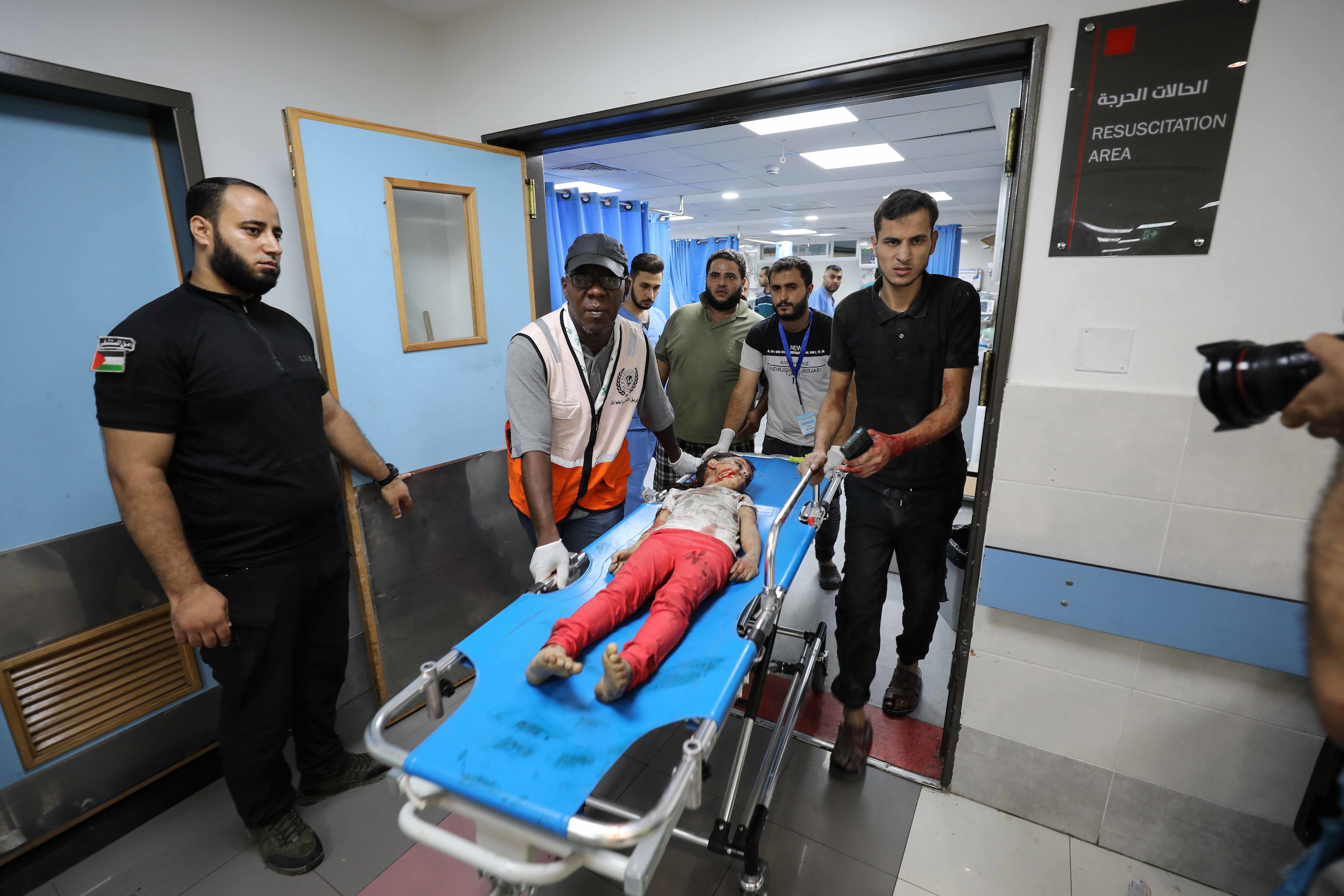
The emergency ward on 11 October 2023

On November 15, Irris Makler, a journalist from France24 stated that while she herself had not seen any evidence of military usage of the hospital, but she interviewed an unnamed British doctor who worked there around 2020 and told her he saw "a few dodgy looking non-medical characters" go in and out of a part of the hospital. The doctor added that he was told to stay away from that part of the hospital, though Makler told him "it is not unusual" for a particular area of a hospital to be off limits. Upon hearing the interview, Michael Neuman, of Médecins Sans Frontières, stated that his staff had worked in Al-Shifa for many years but never saw any evidence of the hospital being use for non-medical purposes.

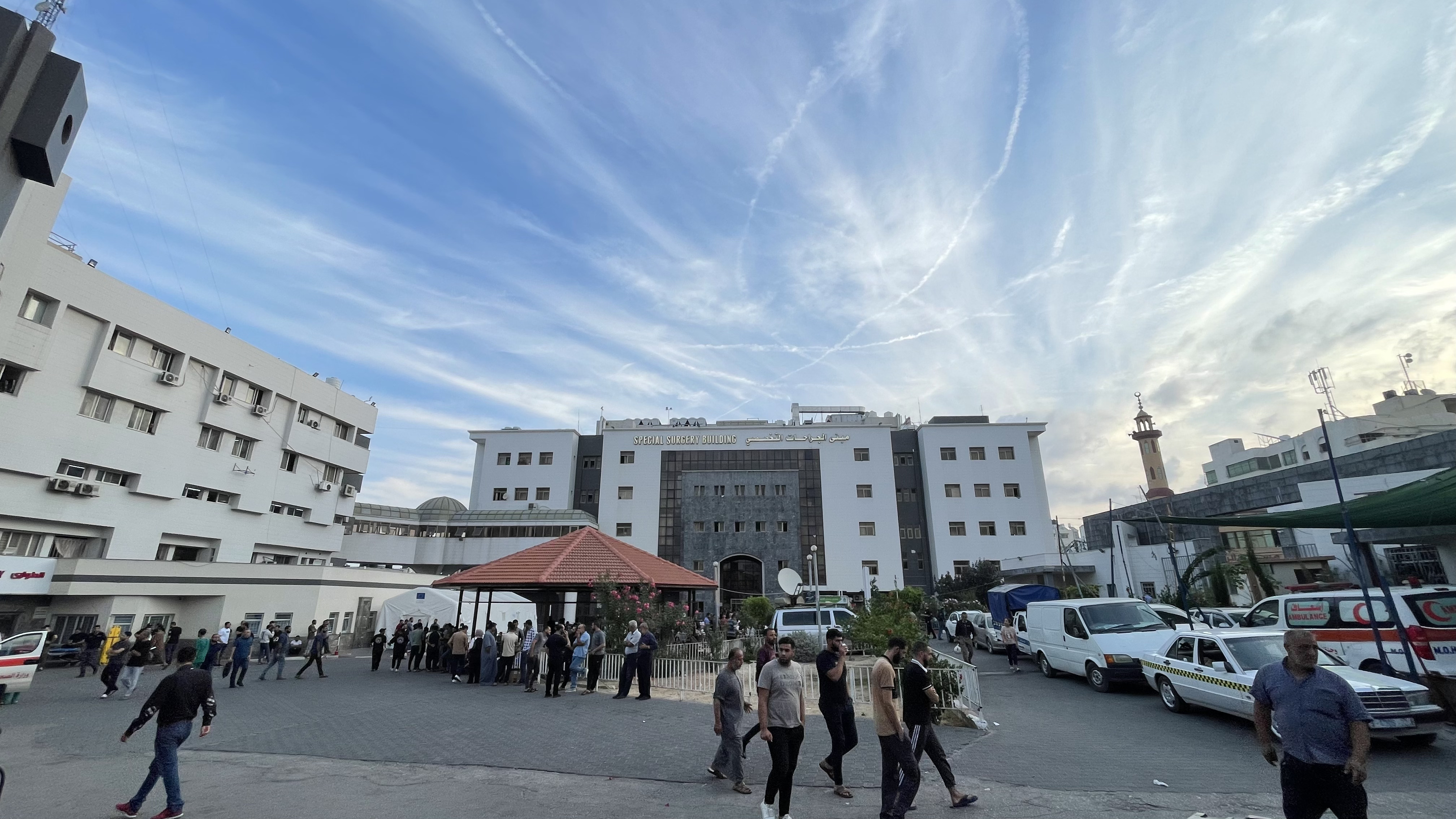
The hospital before its destruction by the Israeli army, October 11, 2023

In the lead up to the 15 November 2023 raid of the hospital, the Israeli government called for the evacuation of the building. This evacuation, considered a "death sentence" by the World Health Organization, was rejected by medical staff who were unwilling to leave patients behind. On the day of the raid, the hospital housed 22 intensive care patients, 36 premature babies and more than 2,000 displaced people according to the medical staff. The IDF says that weapons, ammunition and an operational command center were uncovered in the building, including several assault rifles and grenades found in the hospital's MRI room, an allegation that Hamas dismissed. BBC News and CNN conducted video analyses concluding the Israeli army apparently rearranged, or added, weapons for the media tour. The BBC News also reported it found an Israeli video with the alleged discoveries had been edited despite the IDF Spokesperson's statement that footage was unedited and filmed in one take.

The IDF also said that they delivered incubators, baby food and medical supplies to the hospital. Additionally, the IDF released CCTV footage of people bringing hostages into the hospital. Hamas dismissed the allegations, saying it had already informed the public it took hostages wounded during Israeli airstrikes to hospital to receive medical treatment. The US intelligence agencies said that hostages were held at or under the hospital, however they were moved elsewhere before the Israeli attack.

The United Nations and the Red Cross expressed concern over the incursion into hospital, which was condemned by World Health Organization director-general, Tedros Adhanom Ghebreyesus, who advocated for the safety of hospital patients and staff, even if the hospital was being used militarily. Many political commentators such as Jeremy Bowen of BBC News and Mouin Rabbani, were not convinced that the Israeli evidence proved this was the headquarters of the Hamas operation. After touring the tunnels at the Hospital compound alongside the Israeli military, Haaretz stated "There is no way the hospital administrators didn't know what was happening... there is no doubt they were used by Hamas company, battalion and brigade, and that fighting was directed from there in recent rounds, if not in the current war as well." However, CNN, which also visited the tunnel, did not see evidence it led to a command center. A Gaza engineer who talked with an Al Jazeera English analyst reasoned the videos shown by the IDF were of two different tunnels spliced together; the source also raised suspicions over the fact that the IDF has not tried to open the blast door, even though disarming a trap "usually takes a few hours, not over a day": "You say smoking gun, you get to it and then you don't show the smoking gun." The IDF said that they had to proceed slowly because the tunnel was booby-trapped and that they ran out of time to investigate the tunnels before leaving the hospital. The withdrawal from the hospital was one of the conditions of the 2023 Gaza war ceasefire.

A team with representatives from the UN and the WHO visited the hospital on November 18. They discovered a mass grave, which they were told contained more than eighty bodies. Numerous patients have died because the hospital lacks essential supplies, including oxygen, fuel, and antibiotics. On 19 November, the 31 living premature babies receiving care at al-Shifa were evacuated to Emirati Hospital in Rafah. 28 babies were then evacuated to Egypt on 20 November.

The director of the hospital Mohammad Abu Salmiya was detained on 23 November by Shin Bet for questioning when traveling on a World Health Organisation convoy with other staff. The detention was condemned by Hamas.

In an article published on December 21, 2023, the Washington Post analyzed the publicly released material by Israel, along with satellite imagery and other publicly available material, and concluded that "the evidence presented by the Israeli government falls short of showing that Hamas had been using the hospital as a command and control center". The WP report stated that the rooms which were connected to a tunnel network did not show any immediate evidence of being used by Hamas, and that each of the buildings that the IDF spokesman Daniel Hagari had identified as being "directly involved" in Hamas's military activity did not appear to be connected to any tunnel network, and that there had been no evidence released that showed that a tunnel network could be accessed from inside hospital wards.

On January 2, 2024, U.S. intelligence confirmed its belief that Hamas used the Al-Shifa Hospital as a command center and to hold Israeli hostages, stating that Hamas "used the al-Shifa hospital complex and sites beneath it to house command infrastructure, exercise certain command and control activities, store some weapons, and hold at least a few hostages", although no evidence was publicly presented to sustain those claims.

On February 12, 2024 classified Israeli intelligence documents, obtained and reviewed by The New York Times suggested Hamas did store weapons and took cover at the hospital, using tunnels 213 meters long, twice the size previously known. The tunnels included bunkers, living areas, and computer and communications rooms, and established documents showed that Hamas masked its activities using the hospital. The Times also verified that the tunnel was under the surgery center, but the Israeli military was unable to verify that Hamas operated a command-and-control center beneath the facility. On the other hand, critics of the Israeli military say that the evidence refutes its initial assertions; prior to the attack, it had disseminated information depicting five subterranean complexes and claimed that the tunnel network could be accessed from hospital wards.

=== Second raid (March 18 – April 1, 2024) ===
On 18 March 2024, the IDF raided Al-Shifa hospital again, resulting in extensive gunfights inside and around the hospital complex. According to the Gaza Health Ministry, approximately 3,000 Palestinians were taking shelter in the hospital when the raid began. The IDF stated that Hamas militants were operating in the hospital and that an armed battle began after the commencement of the raid. IDF reported the loss of 1 soldier and claimed to have killed Faiq Mabhouh, who was purportedly the head of operations in Hamas's internal security force, as well as an undisclosed number of Hamas gunmen. Faiq is the brother of Mahmoud Mabhouh the former chief of logistics and weapons procurement of Hamas who was assassinated in 2010. Hamas acknowledged the death of Faiq but denied he was coordinating military operations or to be a member of the military. Al-Aqsa TV claimed he was a member of the Gaza police and the Director of Operations at the Ministry of Interior and the coordinator of aid operations with other agencies such as UNRWA and the tribes. However, UNRWA denied any links to Faiq.

According to Mondoweiss, an individual that they described as a survivor of the subsequent siege reported that hundreds of members of the non-military wings of Hamas and Palestinian Islamic Jihad who were employed in the hospital had gathered there to receive their salaries.

The two-week military operation around Al-Shifa hospital ended on 1 April 2024, with Israeli forces declaring they had withdrawn after "completing the operation". The details of what occurred are a matter of significant debate, largely due to the lack of independent reporting from inside Gaza. Israeli officials claimed some 900 suspects had been apprehended, 200 Hamas and Islamic Jihad fighters killed, weapons and almost US$3 Million in cash seized. Hamas sources claimed Israelis had killed 400 Palestinians inside and around Al-Shifa complex and a Palestinian Red Crescent Society spokesperson claimed on Al Jazeera, that civilians and medical staff had been executed by Israeli soldiers.

United Nations special rapporteurs Tlaleng Mofokeng and Francesca Albanese issued a statement on April 3 stating the attack symbolized "the most horrific assault on Gaza", as it was highly illegal. They added that they were "no longer discussing availability, accessibility, acceptability and quality of health care received in dignity", but the effects of the destruction of health infrastructure in Gaza.

The Israeli operation has been referred to as a massacre by the Jacobin and The Nation. The Euro-Mediterranean Human Rights Monitor stated that "Though the exact number of casualties from the atrocity is still unknown, preliminary reports suggest that over 1,500 Palestinians have been killed, injured, or are reported missing as a result of the massacre at Al-Shifa, with women and children making up half of the casualties."

Published photos and videos showed signs of heavy destruction in and around the complex after the Israeli withdrawal. A WHO spokesperson stated on 1 April 2024 that 21 patients had died during the operation and 107 patients remained inside the complex lacking essential supplies and medical support. According to army statements, Israeli forces had evacuated some 200 patients during the raid. Gaza officials stated the hospital was completely out of service.

=== Situation in 2025 ===
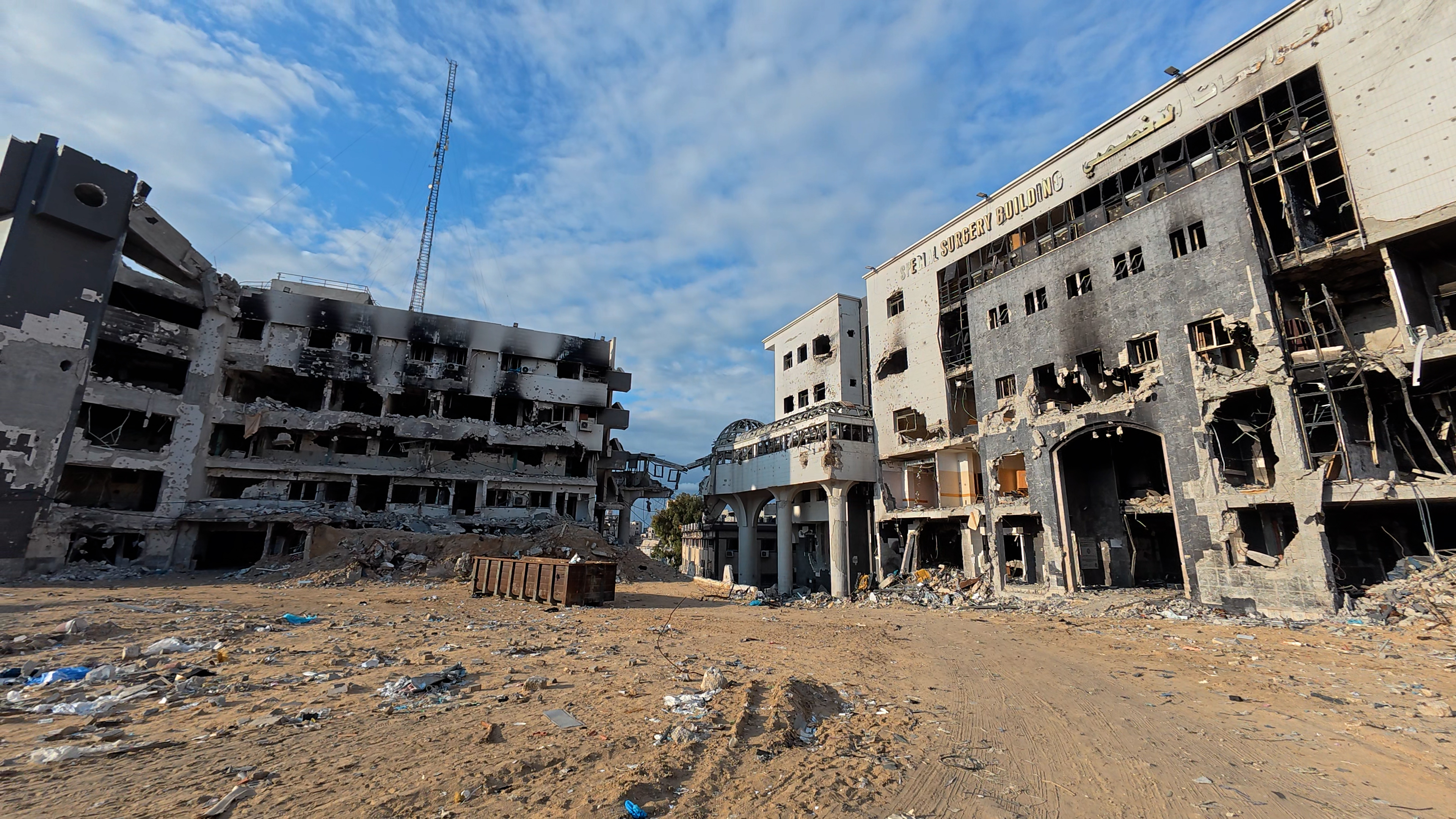
Ruins of Al-Shifa Hospital, destroyed by the Israeli army during Gaza War, 15 April 2025

In September 2026 SBS News interviewed two doctors from Queensland, Australia who had been worrying at the hospital.

=== Mass graves ===
On 14 November 2023, officials at Al-Shifa hospital announced that to date they had buried 179 bodies in a mass grave in the courtyard of the hospital. A week later, Palestinians buried dozens of unidentified bodies taken from Al-Shifa hospital and the Indonesian hospital in a mass grave in Khan Yunis.

In April 2024, health workers in Gaza exhumed the first bodies from mass graves at Al-Shifa Hospital in Gaza City, where, according to a Gaza Civil Defense spokesperson, at least 381 bodies were found after the withdrawal of Israeli forces, not including persons buried within the hospital grounds. The Office of the United Nations High Commissioner for Human Rights (OHCHR), stated that "Among the deceased were allegedly older people, women, and the wounded, while others were found tied and stripped of their clothes."

On 8 May, the Gaza Media Office stated a third mass grave had been found at al-Shifa, with some of the bodies found without heads, raising concerns about possible war crimes. In a statement, the director of the Gaza Emergency Operations Centre said, "The bodies we found were on beds at the reception and emergency department, meaning Israel destroyed the department over the heads of sick and injured people – and they were buried alive."

The United Nations called for "clear, transparent and credible investigations" into the mass graves. Volker Türk emphasized that hospitals are entitled to very special protection under international humanitarian law. He also stated that the deliberate killing of civilians, prisoners, and others who are hors de combat (unable to participate in combat) is a war crime. The United Nations has also called for the preservation of forensic evidence of Gaza's mass graves. The European Union also called for an independent investigation, stating, "This is something that forces us to call for an independent investigation... because indeed it creates the impression that there might have been violations of international human rights committed". The U.S. National Security Advisor stated, "We want to see this thoroughly and transparently investigated." In June 2024, Medical Aid for Palestinians released a statement saying it was "deeply concerned" that no international investigators had been allowed into Gaza.

=== Israeli media campaign ===
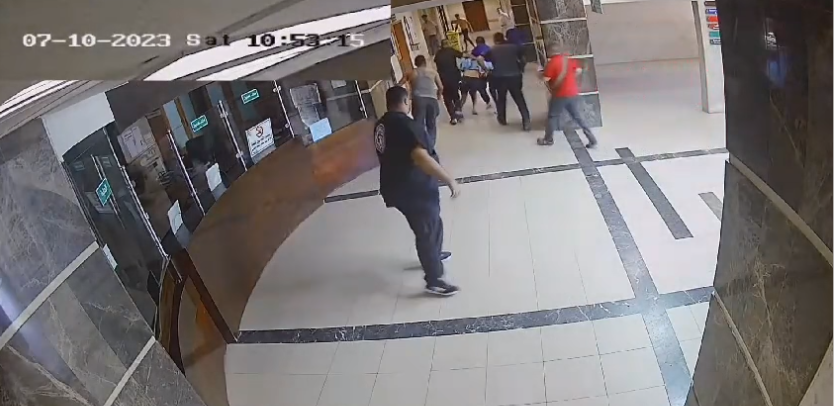
CCTV footage that shows, according to the IDF, Hamas militants dragging a hostage within the hospital.

Before and after the siege, the Israeli government engaged in a public relations campaign aimed at justifying its siege and takeover of the hospital.

On 27 October, Israel published animations purportedly depicting a sophisticated underground Hamas command and control center. The animation reused scenes from an earlier video showing a tunnel under an UNRWA school and also used storefronts sourced from a commercially available asset pack.

On 11 November, the Israeli Ministry of Foreign Affairs tweeted a video purportedly of a 'Palestinian' nurse at al-Shifa in which she backs up Israeli allegations of Hamas usage of the hospital. The Nation described the campaign as propaganda, and stated that the video was widely mocked, with many Arabs questioning its authenticity, and the ministry deleting the tweet in a day. Northwestern University media scholar Marc Owen Jones, writing in The Daily Beast, said of the video, "Everything about it smacked of high school theater—from the botched accent that sounded like it was straight out of an Israeli soap opera to the perfectly scripted IDF talking points rolling off her tongue." France 24 found the video to likely be staged. Some sources alleged that the fake nurse was Israeli-based content creator, Hannah Abutbul, to which she denied the allegations, stating to Newsweek, that she was not the person in the video and was ready to "sue the people who defamed me."

Subsequently, France 24, citing three experts, Michael Milshtein of Tel-Aviv University, Scott Savitz, an Engineer, and Daphne Richmond-Barak of Reichman University in Israel, found the Israeli-released footage of tunnels beneath Shifa hospital "do indicate that these tunnels have all the characteristics of tunnels that belong to the Hamas terrorist group."

Some experts have said that questionable evidence such as stating an Arabic calendar was a Hamas shift schedule, and displaying curtains as evidence that hostage videos were filmed has weakened Israel's credibility, with H. A. Hellyer stating "The irony is they might find something and nobody is going to believe them, at this point their credibility is shot." Adding "We don't take seriously what a terror group says, but we do take seriously what an army says, especially one that's an ally of ours," he said. "So we naturally hold it to a higher standard." Muhammad Shehada, Euro-Mediterranean Human Rights Monitor Chief of Programmes and Communications, said of the requirements that Israel imposed on media outlets on their supervised tours of al-Shifa that the outlets have essentially agreed to broadcast propaganda, saying that speaking to native Palestinians and Gazans and deviating from the IDF's tours are forbidden.

The New Arab, describing the ongoing propaganda campaign and how it has backfired with people questioning Israel's credibility, wrote that Israel had "resorted to fake audio, baseless claims and doctored imagery to whitewash its attack in Gaza." They discussed how the failure of the incubators in the neonatal intensive care unit of al-Shifa caused by the denial of fuel deliveries by Israel and the cutting of electricity was responsible for the deaths of three prematurely born babies. Israel, while it had caused the fuel shortage and failure of the existing incubators, made a show of delivering new incubators to the hospital. However, The New Arab reported the issue was not with the incubators; it was with the lack of fuel, an issue that was not addressed. Reuters reported the IDF said that three battery powered incubators were on standby outside Gaza. The IDF released a video showing them depositing at the front gate of al-Shifa 300 litres of fuel and a photo of a soldier loading mobile incubators, with an IDF spokesman saying "we are trying to bring in incubators that can help transfer babies out of Shifa Hospital to other places down south, which will help safeguard the babies in the hospital". A doctor at al-Shifa said they had not taken the 300 litres as it was, according to NBC News, "virtually a drop in the bucket" compared to the 10,000 litres needed to run important areas of the hospital. The IDF stated that Hamas had told hospital staff not to collect the fuel, and it said on Tuesday that the delivery was just meant to save the lives of people in the hospital — specifically babies and children — and not run the entire hospital. On 19 November, a WHO-led joint UN and Palestinian Red Crescent mission evacuated 31 babies to a hospital in southern Gaza in 6 ambulances supplied by the Palestine Red Crescent, and at least 28 of them were moved on to Egypt. Eight babies had died prior to the evacuation.

Jeremy Scahill, in an article published on 21 November 2023 by The Intercept, also referred to Israel's attempts to justify its siege of the hospital as propaganda. Scahill opined that the evidence offered by the IDF after taking control of the hospital was unimpressive. Scahill observed that it was not a secret that there existed tunnels and underground rooms at Al-Shifa Hospital complex–indeed, Israel assisted in their construction and hired Hamas militants as guards to protect the contractors who worked on the underground facilities in the 1980s.

Following Israel's release of video evidence on 22 November, the Associated Press, the New York Times, the Wall Street Journal, the Guardian, Sky News stated that this did not constitute conclusive evidence to demonstrate the use by Hamas of a command center. The Wall Street Journal noted that "While many security analysts agree the latest evidence Israel has released increasingly suggests a Hamas presence at the hospital, most say they have yet to see something that constitutes a smoking gun showing it was a command center for Hamas, as Israel has alleged." Haaretz assessed the footage to be "unequivocal proof that the terror group used the hospital for its military needs." Amnesty International, saying it had yet to see "any credible evidence" that al-Shifa was housing a Hamas command center, said that "Israel has repeatedly failed to produce any evidence to substantiate this claim, which it has promoted since at least the 2008-9 Operation Cast Lead".

== See also ==
- List of hospitals in the State of Palestine

== Bibliography ==
- Husseini, Rafiq; Barnea, Tamara (2002). Separate and Cooperate, Cooperate and Separate: The Disengagement of the Palestine Health Care System from Israel and Its Emergence as an Independent System. Greenwood Publishing Group. ISBN 0-275-97583-5.
