= University Hospital of North Norway =

- Northern Norway Regional Health Authority
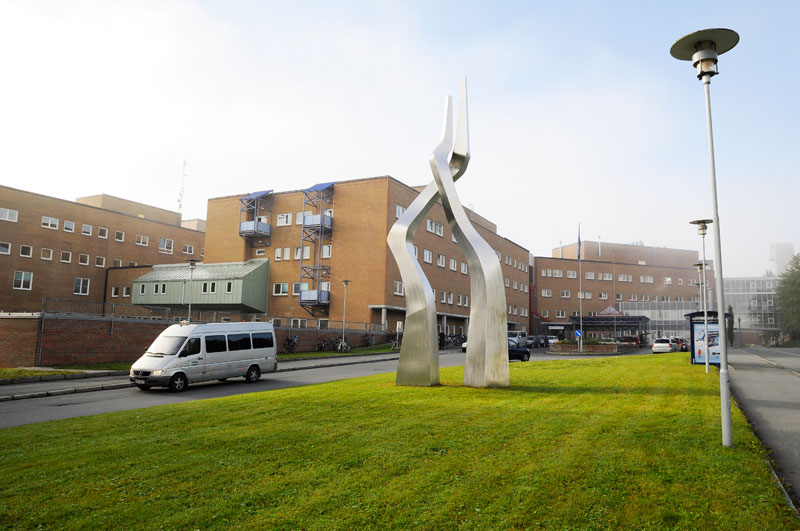
- UNN at Tromsø

Geography
- Location: Tromsø, Nordland, Troms and Finnmark, Norway
- Coordinates: 69.68°N 18.98°E

Organisation
- Type: Teaching

Services
- Emergency department: Yes

History
- Opened: 2001

Links
- Lists: Hospitals in Norway
- Company
- Type: Health Trust
- Industry: Healthcare
- Founded: 18 December 2001
- Headquarters: Tromsø, Norway
- Area served: Nordland, Troms, Finnmark
- Key people: Anita Elisabeth Schumacher (CEO); Ansgar Gabrielsen (Chair)
- Number of employees: 5,700 (2011)
- Parent: Northern Norway Regional Health Authority
- Website: www.unn.no

The University Hospital of North Norway (Norwegian: Universitetssykehuset Nord-Norge) or UNN is a hospital and health trust.

UNN is a university hospital for the region which includes the counties of Nordland, Troms and Finnmark. It is part of the Northern Norway Regional Health Authority (Norwegian: Helse Nord). Its service area has a combined population of 465,000. Patient treatment and diagnostic investigation as well as training and research takes place at eleven clinics. The hospital system provides local hospital services to the 110,000 inhabitants of the Tromsø area, as well as the inhabitants of southern Troms and northern Nordland from facilities located in Harstad, Longyearbyen and Narvik.

UNN also serves the regional Emergency Medical Communication Center (Akuttmedisinsk kommunikasjonssentral) and operates a number of ambulance stations in Nordland and Troms.
